= Gurjars in Kashmir =

Ethnic group in the larger Kashmir region

Kashmiri Gujjars
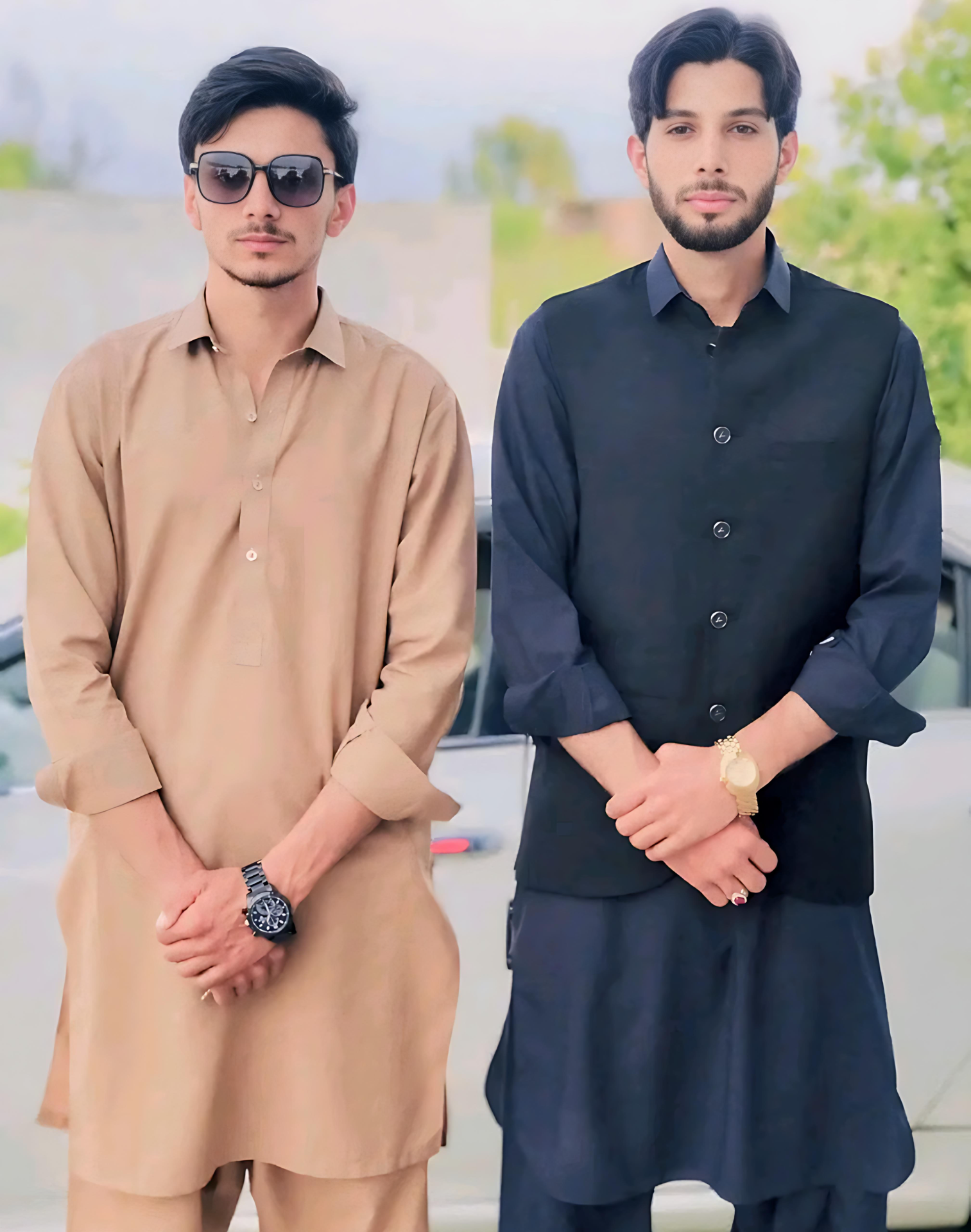
- Two Gurjar men in traditional dress from Bhimber District, Azad Jammu and Kashmir.

Total population
- 23,03,098 (see below)

Regions with significant populations
- • Pakistan • India
- Jammu and Kashmir: 15,00,000 (estimated) (Note: According to official statistics of Jammu and Kashmir there are 1.5 million (15 lakh) Gurjars & Bakarwals in the state.) 11,70,054 [only Gujari speaking (2011 census)]
- Azad Kashmir: 8,00,000 (2020 census)
- Gilgit-Baltistan: 3,098 (1931 census)
- Ladakh: 154 [only Gujari speaking (2011 census)]
- Aksai Chin: N/A

Languages
- • Gujari (Note: Kashmiri Gujjars are a multilingual community. They speak multiple languages including: Gujari, Kashmiri, Pahari, Dogri, Balti, Shina, Ladakhi, Punjabi, Urdu.) • Pahari • Kashmiri • Dogri • Shina • Balti • Punjabi • Ladakhi • Urdu

Religion
- Sunni Islam (Note: All Kashmiri Gurjars are Muslims and they belong to sunni sect of Islam.)

Related ethnic groups
- Gurjar, Muslim Gurjars, Kashmiris, Bakarwals
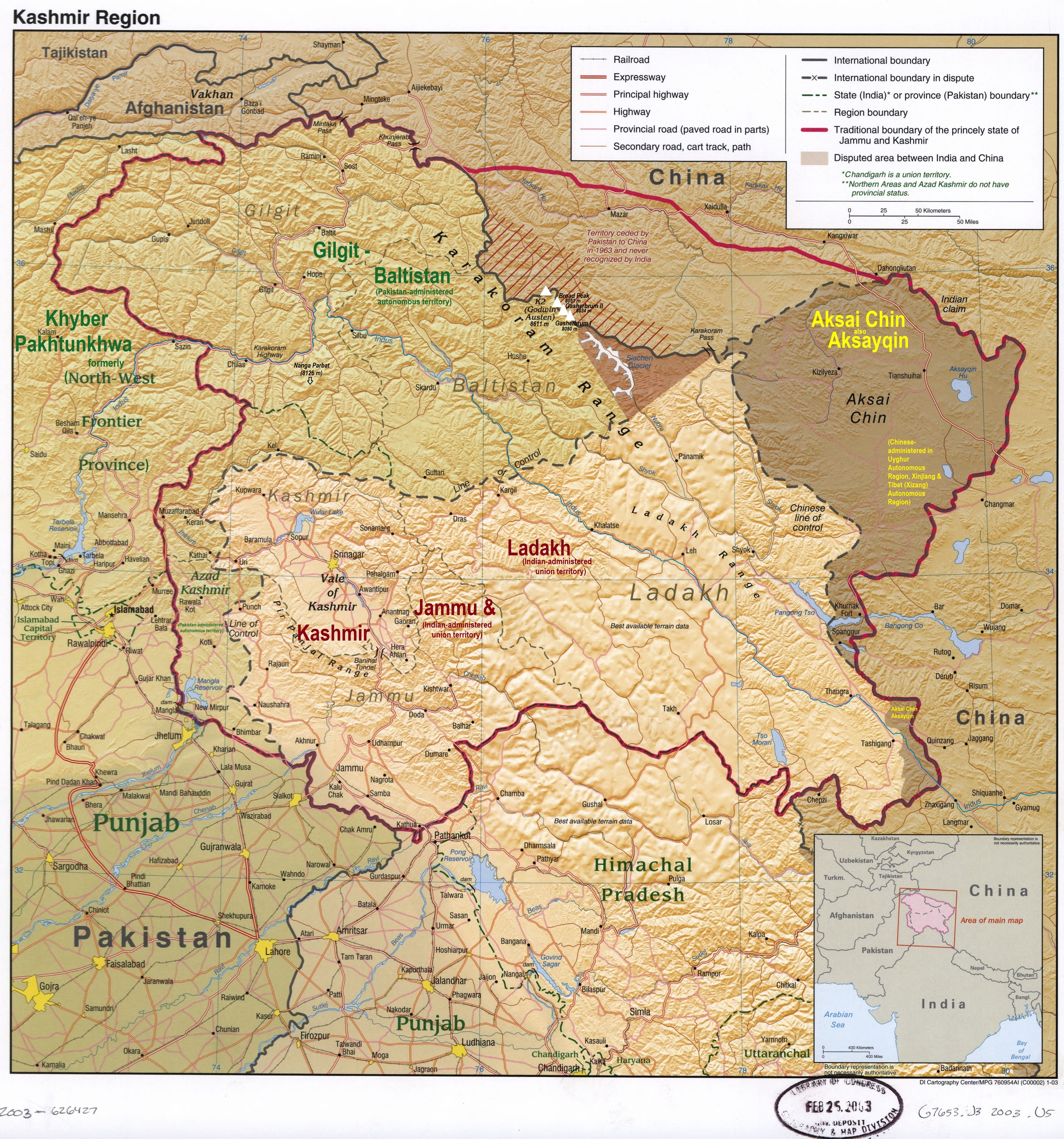
- Titles : Sardar, Malik, Mian, Khan, Rana, Choudhary Political map of the Kashmir region, showing the Pir Panjal Range and the Kashmir Valley or Vale of Kashmir

Gurjars in Kashmir or Kashmiri Gujjars, are an ethnic community native to the larger Kashmir region, which has been the subject of a dispute between India and Pakistan since 1947 and between India and China since 1959. They are descended from Gurjars who moved into this region during medieval times. They are mainly found in the Pakistan-administered Azad Kashmir and Gilgit-Baltistan and Indian-administered Jammu and Kashmir and Ladakh union territories. They are accounted as the largest ethnic group in Azad Kashmir, third-largest ethnic group in Jammu and Kashmir, and a minority ethnic group in Gilgit-Baltistan and Ladakh. (Note: Gurjars is a single largest ethnic group in Azad Kashmir third largest ethnic in Jammu and Kashmir and minority ethnic groups in Gilgit-Baltistan and Ladakh.) They are scattered across almost all districts of the Kashmir region; they are densely populated in Poonch, Rajouri, Reasi, Ganderbal, Kishtwar, Ramban, Anantnag, Muzafarabad, Kotli, Hattian Bala, Haveli, Gilgit, Skardu, and Kargil, while Leh, Sudhanoti and Srinagar districts have the smallest Gujjar population. In Kashmir, they adopted Islam through the influence of Sufism between the 10th and 16th centuries.

Gujjars make up around 72% of the total tribal population and roughly 20 to 25% of Jammu and Kashmir's total population, (Note: Gujjars make up 20-25% in total population of Jammu and Kashmir (union territory). They make up 72% in total tribal population of J&K.) While in Azad Kashmir, they make up 20% of the total population. As per the 1931 census of British India, they make up 3.21% of Gilgit-Baltistan's total population.

Gurjars and Bakarwals in Kashmir region speak their own language, Gujari, along with various regional languages. Gujari is the second most spoken language in Azad Kashmir and Jammu and Kashmir, and rank 6th or 7th in Gilgit-Baltistan. In Ladakh it is spoken by less than 1% of Ladakh's population.

Gurjars in Jammu and Kashmir are divided into three major groups: settled Gujjars (Zamindar/landlord), semi-settled Gujjars, and landless Gujjars. The landless or nomad Gujjars are further divided into subgroups: Bakarwal, Banjara and Dodhi Gujjars. (Note: Gurjars of Jammu and Kashmir are divided into three main categories: Settled/Zamindar, Semi-settled and nomad/landless Gujjars. Nomad/Landless Gujjars further divided into Bakarwals, Banihara/Dodhi and Banjara Gujjars.)

A 2024 field survey found that 97% of Gujjars in Jammu and Kashmir are now settled and ended their nomadic lifestyle. Over 30–40 years, they have settled in one place due to climate change, forest laws, and shepherding being not profitable. Only 3% are still nomadic, mainly in the Kashmir Valley.

Gurjar and Bakarwal in Kashmir are also known as 'natures's own children and Lords of the forest', due to their strong bond with nature and the forest. In Indian-administrated Jammu and Kashmir, there are almost 150 clans or Gotras of Gurjars, out of a total around nine hundred Gurjar clans scattered across the Indian Sub-continent.

== History ==
The earliest mention of Gurjars in the Kashmir region is found in the Chamba Copper Plates, indicating they were present in the region as early as the 10th century. These Gurjars were Muslims, and it is likely that they had converted to Islam prior to migrating to this area of the Indian subcontinent. (Note: The early mention of Gurjars in Kashmir region was found in Chamba copper plate that was found in present-day Chamba district of Himachal Pradesh.)

Historian Niharranjan Ray said Gurjars of Kashmir are descendants of the Gurjaras and they likely came from north Punjab during the rule of Karkota dynasty in 627 - 795 AD, when Kashmir controlled parts of Punjab. Historian Uhlig said they moved from India's plains to Kashmir, where they got land after helping with irrigation.

Gurjars in Kashmir region came in two waves: some directly from Rajasthan, Gujarat and Kathiawar, while others came from the Punjab, where they had settled earlier.

According to "Mohd Ashraf Ganie and Arif Habib et al", Gurjars migrated to the region in the 9th to 10th century. Earlier Gurjar settlements excited in the western Indian plains, such as Gujarat, Kathiawar, and Jodhpur where some of Gurjars were even in power.

Gujjars in the districts of Poonch, Udhampur, Reasi, Jammu, Rajouri, and Kathua districts claimed their ancestry from the Gujarat district of Punjab, Pakistan. In Kashmir Valley, Gurjars claimed their ancestors moved there - some claimed it was in the 16th century, while others said it was between 1127 - 1154 AD, during Raja Bajay Singh's rule near Pir Panjal Range.

According to Surjit Singh Sooden and Aparna Rao, Gurjars in Kashmir migrated from Punjab and Khyber Pakhtunkhwa (N.W.F.P) present-day provinces of Pakistan. They were inhabited Kashmir region even before the arrival of Mughals in Indian subcontinent.

According to Kulbhushan Warikoo, the Gurjars of Swat and Mardan districts in Khyber Pakhtunkhwa, as well as those in Kashmir region and eastern Afghanistan, claim that they are originated from the larger region of Punjab.

== History ==
In the medieval era, Gujjars in Kashmir faced attacks from the armies of Mahmud of Ghazni, Mughals, and Sikhs when they attacked Kashmir.

The 10th century Chamba copper plate inscriptions contain the first recorded mention of the Gurjars in the Kashmir region. The Gurjars along with the Durgara tribe, entered the Jammu region of Kashmir during the dominance of "Gurjaras" in the Punjab region. The Durgaras are first mentioned in the Chamba copper plate inscriptions, which refer to events from the early part of the 10th century in which one 'Durgaresvara', the lord of the Durgara tribe, was mentioned.

In 10th century Tunga Gurjar (or Rai Tunga) of Buddivasa was ethnically a Gurjar who played and important role in politics of Jammu and Kashmir during the rule of Queen Didda of Utpala dynasty from 958 to 1003 C.E. Tunga joined Didda's court as a letter-carrier, also known as 'Lekhaharakara'. He gained the full trust of Dibba and was promoted to the position responsible for foreign affairs in the administration of Kashmir. When Dibba ruled as an independent queen, she appointed Tunga as Prime minister, or Sanadhikarin, and played him above all other officials. Later, because of his skill as well as his judgement and character, he became the main center of power in the Kashmir court. He captured Rajouri for queen Didda. In 1014 C.E, he defended his country near the Toshi river, at poonch against the attack of Mahmud of Ghazni.

In the 12th century, Kalhana's Rajatarangini mentioned that Gurjars ruled over the Kashmir valley and the surrounding areas.

Gurjars are believed to have been residents of the Kashmir region long before the arrival of Mughals in Kashmir. The Mughal emperor Babar encountered them in Sialkot, a district currently in Punjab, Pakistan, which borders Jammu and Kashmir, indicating their established presence in the surrounding area.

Dr. Dharamvir Bharati, a known Hindi writer, wrote a travel book about Kashmir called "Ek Yaad Ek Prarihana". He describes his personal experiences in Kashmir region, including the mountains, Gujjar community, Gurez Valley, Kashmir Valley, Krishna Ganga Jungles and other tribes of Kashmir.

Dinoo Bhai Pant, a 20th-century Dogri poet described the Gujari women of Kashmir in a poem named "Gujari (A Gujjar belle)" as:

Dinoo's experienced mind is evident here but the qualities of Dinoo's earlier poetry pungency, incisive style, vigour and humour— are absent from these poems. One suspects Dinoo is holding his real feelings in check. In Gujari (A Gujjar belle), he has directed his poetic qualities to a romantic topic. But Dinoo is too great to be an escapist. He describes the beauty of Gujari like the poet of Shringar Ras, but for him Gujari is something more than a young pretty woman. It is her spirit, her cour-age and action which are necessary in the present-day society. She is economically self-sufficient. She makes her living by doing physical labour. She is not a slave of gold nor does she care for anyone. Dinoo gives a new twist to her role in the modern world. She is not Sita or you who did not cross the line when Ravan came to abduct her. She will rather defy such Ravana. She is carefree though not careless. She is the fearless daughter of Adam, undaunted as the first waves of the Ganga. The poem is rich in references to the Ramayana and the Bhagwat Puran. The reference to Radha at once shows the social values which Dinoo holds dear. Radha was a milk-maid and she represents action and the uninhibited spirit of humanity. Gujari is the modern Radha, and as such the sister-in-law of Krishen Kanhai.

=== Dynasties/states ===
==== Sangu dynasty ====
In the 18th century a Gujjar of Sangu clan Rooh Ullah Khan established Sangu dynasty or state in Poonch region of Kashmir. During the reign of Raja Bahadur Khan, Ruhullah rose to such prominence that he was appointed the post of Wazir. In 1797, Abdullah Khan, the Nazim of Kashmir, attacked Poonch and appointed Wazir Ruhullah Khan as its ruler in 1798.

In June 1814 Ranjit Singh's army attacked Poonch and Rajauri. Ruhulla Khan, Poonch's ruler blocked their way. A fight broke out, and around 500 people were wounded or killed on both sides. In this battle Ruhulla Khan convincingly defeated Maharaja Ranjit Singh. Aghar Khan helped Ruhullah by spreading rumors the Sikhs were losing, which led locals attack the Sikhs and steal their supplies. After this the two local leaders started attacking the Sikhs with their armies. Ruhullah Khan died in 1819 and was succeeded by his grandson Mir Baz Khan.

==== Chiefs of Poonch region ====
In the 17th century Abdur Razzak Khan was a Gujjar chief of the Poonch region of Kashmir. He was the son of Abdul Fateh Khan Zamindar of Poonch. In the early 18th century Muslim Gujjars with Bomba and Khakha tribes from the lower Jehlum Valley, would often attack Kashmir. They would raid the valley when the central government of the Mughal Empire was weak, killing and looting. These attacks terrified the people of Kashmir and the tribes names became synonymous with terror. During Ali Muhammad Khan's rule (1713–15), the Bomba chief with Gujjar chief Abdur Razzak of Poonch region started causing trouble in Karna and Baramulla areas. Ali Muhammad Khan stopped this trouble arrested Gujjar chief and Haibat Khan grandson of Bomba Chief. In 1732 during rule of Abu Barakat Khan again and Haibat Khan raided but Abu Khan personally stopped him.

In the past, Ianayat Ullah Khan, a Mughal noble, lost control of Kashmir to Abu Barakat Khan. Abu Barakat declared himself independent established his power in Kashmir, but Inayat Ullah Khan and his son gathered a force and defeated him. Then Abu Barakat sought refuge with the Gujjar ruler of Poonch region, who took him in and helped him attack Inayat Ullah Khan. Inayat Ullah Khan teamed up with local tribes (Bomba and Khakha) to fight back, but Abu Barakat Khan got help mainly from Gujjars in Poonch and defeated him, killing Inayat Ullah Khan. Later in the 1740s, Babar Ullah Khan, a district commissioner, wanted independence and hot support from Gujjars, Bomba and Khakha tribes to rebel against Abu Barakat Khan. The violence stopped when a new governor, Abu Mansur Khan took over in 1745. But the Gujjars, Bomba and Khakha tribes kept causing trouble until 1846, when Maharaja Ghulab Singh and British army stopped them.

The political situation during Hari Singh's poor rule became worse. People began grouping together on the basis of religion, and Hindus and Muslims formed their own groups. In 1932, during Srinagar riots and Glancy Commission hearings, violence against Gurjars was also reported. One member of the Dodhi Gujar community was killed by Hindus. According to eyewitnesses, three other Muslim Gurjars were also dragged to a Hindu temple and killed by Hindu mob.

Most of farmers in Tangir district were not local residents. The leaseholders were usually immigrants from the Valleys of Kohistan region, particularly Gurjars. The Gurjars are believed to have originally come from the border areas of Punjab. In the Khabari Valley of Diamer District, all farmers are dakans. The entire population of the valley lives in large, open settlements and consists entirely of Gurjars. The Gurjars farm land here that belongs to villagers from Darel District. Many of them speak their Gujari language.

In 1922, Gurjars from the Naltar valley migrated to Gilgit District and founded a village named Gujjar Das, now known as Sultanabad. Later in 1932, other people from Gilgit area purchased land there. Initially it was a Gurjar village. Today, Gujjars makes up about 30% of the village's total population.

==== Post colonial period ====
Zuni Gujjari a Muslim Gurjar woman was a key figure in Kashmir's nationalist movement. She showed bravery and leadership in the Women's Self Defense Corps (WSDC), a women's group formed in 1947 to protect Kashmir from attackers. Zuni was born around 1912 into a poor Gurjar family, and she started fighting against the Maharaja Hari Singh's unfair rule, which led to her being jailed several times. She became a symbol of resistance and was featured in posters, photos, and pamphlets, inspiring many Kashmiri women to join the fight for freedom and justice. Zuni's story highlights the important role women played in shaping Kashmir's history.

After British rule ended in 1947, the lambardar system for Gurjars and Bakarwals changed. Lambardar were no longer elected and they stopped getting salaries. However, their families still kept their social and economic influence. In short, power and wealth continued to matter the most.

In 1947, the partition of India affected Jammu and Kashmir, splitting it into two parts (Pakistani-administered Kashmir and Indian-administered Jammu and Kashmir). Despite serving in the Maharaja Hari Singh Dogra's army, many Gurjars and Bakarwals massacred in Jammu division and nearby areas in 1947 Jammu massacres. Some escaped to Pakistan, but some in Rajouri, Poonch and Kashmir stayed in India. The Partition of India still had a big impact on them. Pakistan's control part of Kashmir restricted the Gujjars and Bakarwals movements, dividing families across the border. Partition of India, hurt the community socially, politically, and economically. During the rule of the Dogra dynasty, the Gurjars were largely pushed out of the politics of the Jammu and Kashmir. Hari Singh gave a few seats to some Gurjar leaders in the "Praja Sabha" before 1947. A small number of Gujjars also served in the Maharaja's army, with Choudhary Khuda Baksh Gujjar, and Chowdhary Bali Mohammed Gujjar rising to the ranks of Brigadier and Colonel, respectively. During this era, some Gurjars were active in the local politics of Jammu and Kashmir, and few Gurjars were elected to the "Praja Sabha". Prominent Gurjar leaders of this time include, Ch. Ghulam Hussain Lassanvi, Mian Nizam Din Larvi, Haji Mohd. Israil Khatana, and Ch. Buland Khan Rasom.

During the 1947 Partition of India, many Muslim Gujjars were killed in the Jammu division and nearby areas. Survivors fled to Pakistan, but most Gujjars in Poonch, Rajauri, and Kashmir division stayed in their homes.

In the 1947 Partition of India, communal violence broke out in Jammu and Kashmir. Muslim soldiers were disarmed, while soldiers of other faith were not. According to Ian Stephens, Maharaja Hari Singh supported violence against Muslim Gurjars and even ordered his forces to fire at them. Eyewitnesses also accused Hari Singh of directly participating in killings, including shooting three 'Muslim Gujjars' at Mishriwala.

When India was divided in 1947, many Gurjars moved from Jammu and Kashmir (controlled by India) to areas now part of Pakistan, like Azad Kashmir and Punjab and it is estimated Approximately 17,000 Gurjars migrated to Azad Kashmir.

In Jammu and Kashmir Gurjar and Bakarwal communities have faced violence and displacement multiple times. In 1947, they were affected by war. In India–Pakistan war of 1965, their homes were burned by the Indian army, forcing them to flee. In the 1990s, they were caught between militant groups and security forces, making life unpredictable.

=== Insurgency in Jammu and Kashmir ===
Gujjars and Bakarwals are ethnically different ethnic group from Kashmiri people. They are often seen as informers for the Indian Government and security forces, especially when militants hide in the mountains. Because of this, militants have been targeting them. Massacres of Gujjars and Bakarwals, two similar ethnic groups, have been reported in various incidents.

In Jammu and Kashmir, Pahari Muslims and Gurjars initially supported militancy, but turned against each other due to security forces targeting Muslims. On 3 August 1998, a Gujjar militant was killed by a Pahari militant, sparking retaliation. Gurjars then became untrusted by militant leaders, suspected of being informers, and some Gujjars were killed by militants.

==== 2000 - 2005 ====
On 6 June 2000, 32 people were killed in the Pahalgam massacre. 21 were Hindus, and 11 were Muslim Gujjars and Bakarwals from Doda and Anantnag districts.

In February 2001, five Gujjars were killed in Bhandrai Taryath, Udhampur district. The following month, eight Gujjars were killed as Atholi in Doda district. On 9 February 2001, 15 Gujjars were killed in a militant attack in Rajouri district. Militants in Jammu and Kashmir often target Gujjars and Bakarwals, suspecting them of being informers for the Indian Government. In May 2001, 10 Bakarwals were killed near Kishtwar, Doda and 7 Gujjars were killed in Dara Sangla, Surankote, Poonch district.

In further incidents include the killing of 7 Gujjars in Kupwara in August 2002, and 12 Gujjars, including a woman and 4 children, were killed in a militant attack in June 2004. Additionally, there were report of Gujjars of militants chopping off the noses of Gujjars in Kotdhara in 2002. In July 2004, 5 Gujjars were gunned down in Rajouri district, and in August 2004, a Gujjar couple was brutally killed in Poonch district, reportedly for not supporting militants.

In July 2005, 4 Gujjars were killed in the Dachigam area near Srinagar district, followed by another 4 Gujjars were killed in the same area in June 2005.

==== 2019 - present ====
Two Gujjar Men, Abdul Qadeer Kohli and Manzoor Ahmed, from Pulwama district, originally from Rajouri district, were kidnapped and killed on 20 August 2019 by the militants.

==== Custodial deaths & alleged encounters ====
The Kashmiri Muslims faced more of it, Gurjars and to some extent Bakarwals were also harassed, persecuted, raped, tortured, and killed by the Indian security forces. This shared suffering brought Gurjars and Bakarwals closer together. Still now Gujjar and Bakarwal communities in Indian-administrated Jammu and Kashmir are victims of custodial deaths and alleged encounters with the Indian army and Jammu and Kashmir Police. In August 2020, three Gurjar families from Rajouri district in Jammu and Kashmir reported their sons missing. The sons, Imtiyaz Ahmad, Ibrar Ahmad and Moharmad Ibrar, had gone to southern Kashmir to look for work. After they did not return, the families went to the police station. Weeks later, pictures of three alleged "terrorists" killed in a shootout in Amshipora village appeared online. The Indian army said they were terrorist, but it turned out they were the missing sons, confirmed by DNA tests. They were from the Gujjars and Bakarwals communities. The Amshipora fake encounter was not just a single event. It is part of a bigger issue - many in the community believe the government and Indian army has been targeting Gujjar and Bakarwal communities with violence and unfair treatment since 2014.

On 24 December 2020 The People's Anti-Fascist Front (PAFF) attacked on Indian army. In response Indian army picked up three men from Gujjar-Bakarwal communities in Jammu and Kashmir. The men - Safeer Ahmed 44, Mohammad Showkat, 26, and Shabir Ahmed, 28 - died from injuries in Indian Army's custody.

In July 2020, three Gurjar workers from Rajouri district were killed in fake encounter by Indian army in Amshipora (Shopian), and a man named Mukhtar Hussain Shah died in custody in April 2023. These events made Muslim Gujjars in Pir Panjal region population uneasy.

In April 2023, several young Gujjar men were found dead in a canal in South Kashmir. The police said it was an accident, but the families believe they were tortured and killed. A few months later, in July 2023, another young Gujjar was killed Jammu district. The police claimed it was a shootout, but his family said it was set up.

In November 2023, an Indian army captain was given bail and had his life sentence suspended for killing three Gurjar and Bakarwal men in Amshipora. Later, militants killed four soldiers in Poonch district. The Indian army then detained villagers from a Gujjar Hamlet, and three died in custody. Videos showed soldiers beating and torturing detainees.

In February 2025, a young Gujjar man named Makhan Din made a video before taking his own life. He said in the video that police had beaten him until he falsely admitted to seeing militants. Police deny this, saying they only asked him about suspicious contacts with Pakistan. Din's father says his son was beaten and could not take it anymore. This event has shocked the Gujjar community and made them feel scared and hopeless, like they are being punished by the government.

In March 2025, three young Gujjar men from Kulgam district went missing on their way to a wedding. They were later found dead in the Veshaw River. Their families say they were killed by the Jammu and Kashmir Police and they showed signs of torture, but police say they drowned.

In April 2025, Altaf Hussain Lali, a Gujjar from Bandipora district, was killed in an encounter. His family says it was a fake encounter, and he was labeled as a militant supporter.

On 4 May 2025, Imtiyaz Ahmad Magray, a 23 years old Gujjar from Tangmarg, Kulgam district, died after allegedly jumping into a stream during a search operation while in Indian army's custody.

On 25 July 2025, a police constable in Jammu was arrested for killing a 21-year-old Gujjar man, Mohammad Parvez from Javed Nagar, Nikki Tawi area of Jammu district. He was shot dead near Jammu city in an encounter, and the Gujjar community protested, saying it was a fake encounter. The police had claimed he was a drug peddler killed in a shootout, but actually he had no criminal record. Former CM Mehbooba Mufti called the arrest a "crucial step towards justice", saying no one is above the law.

=== Contributions for Indian army ===
In Jammu and Kashmir, Muslim Gurjars have a long history of serving in the Indian army, often providing crucial support and information. However, they are now seeking greater recognition and representation within the Indian Army. In recent years Gurjars from the Indian Kashmir demanded for the separate Gurjar regiment in Indian army. The recent killing of rifleman Aurangzeb who comes from Gurjar community by terrorist highlights the sacrifices they have made for India. Aurangzeb's family, from Salani village in Poonch district, has strong army connections. His brother Mohammad Qasim is currently serving in Pune, and his 15-year-old sibling Asim wants to follow in their footsteps. The family's ties to the army run keep, but they are aware of the risks involved. Aurangzeb's father, Mohammad Hanief, a retired soldier, said his son's death is not the first time a Muslim Gurjar has died for India. Many from their community have died fighting, and some have been killed in cross-border firing. He emphasized that it is the Muslim Gurjars, not Kashmiri Muslims, who are fighting against militancy.

The family understands the dangers of military service, having faced them before. In 2004, Aurangzeb Gujjar's uncle, also a soldier, was kidnapped and killed by terrorists. Another example is Mohammad Din Jagir, a Bakarwal Gujjar who alerted authorities to suspicious Pakistani activity before the India–Pakistan war of 1965, earning him the Padma Shri Award in 1966. He was also killed by terrorists 25 years later.

Another Gurjar who served in Indian army from Kashmir was Brigadier Khuda Baksh. He was born on 22 August 1904, in a Muslim Gujjar family. He joined the state forces in 1922 as Second Lieutenant and became a Lieutenant Colonel by 1937. He led the 2nd Jammu and Kashmir Rifles in World War II, showing great bravery and earning awards and land in Multan. He was promoted to Brigadier in 1946 and got Awards from the British Empire. His service was appreciated by Maharaja Hari Singh and Indian Army's top commander. He was made Chief of Staff of the state forces at Jammu brigade which was previously led by Brigadier N.S. Rawat. When Pakistan-led invaders attacked Kashmir in 1947, Khuda Baksh was in charge of the Jammu Cantonment and played a crucial role in defending the borders due to his military expertise.

Malli or Mali Bibi, a Muslim Gurjar woman from Poonch district, India, played a crucial role in Poonch during the 1971 Indo-Pak war. On 13 December 1971, Malli saw suspicious activity at Pillanwali, a remote area, while collecting fooder for livestock. She found Pakistani soldiers preparing to attack Poonch district and informed the Indian army despite challenges. Guiding the army through difficult snow-covered terrain, Malli's efforts led to the soldiers and stopped the attack.

Her actions saved many lives and she received the Padma Shri Award in 1972. Malli's story highlights the involvement of Gurjar women in important events. The Government Degree College in Mandi is named after her. Malli's actions are part of history, showing women's roles in wars.

== Demographics ==
=== Azad Kashmir ===
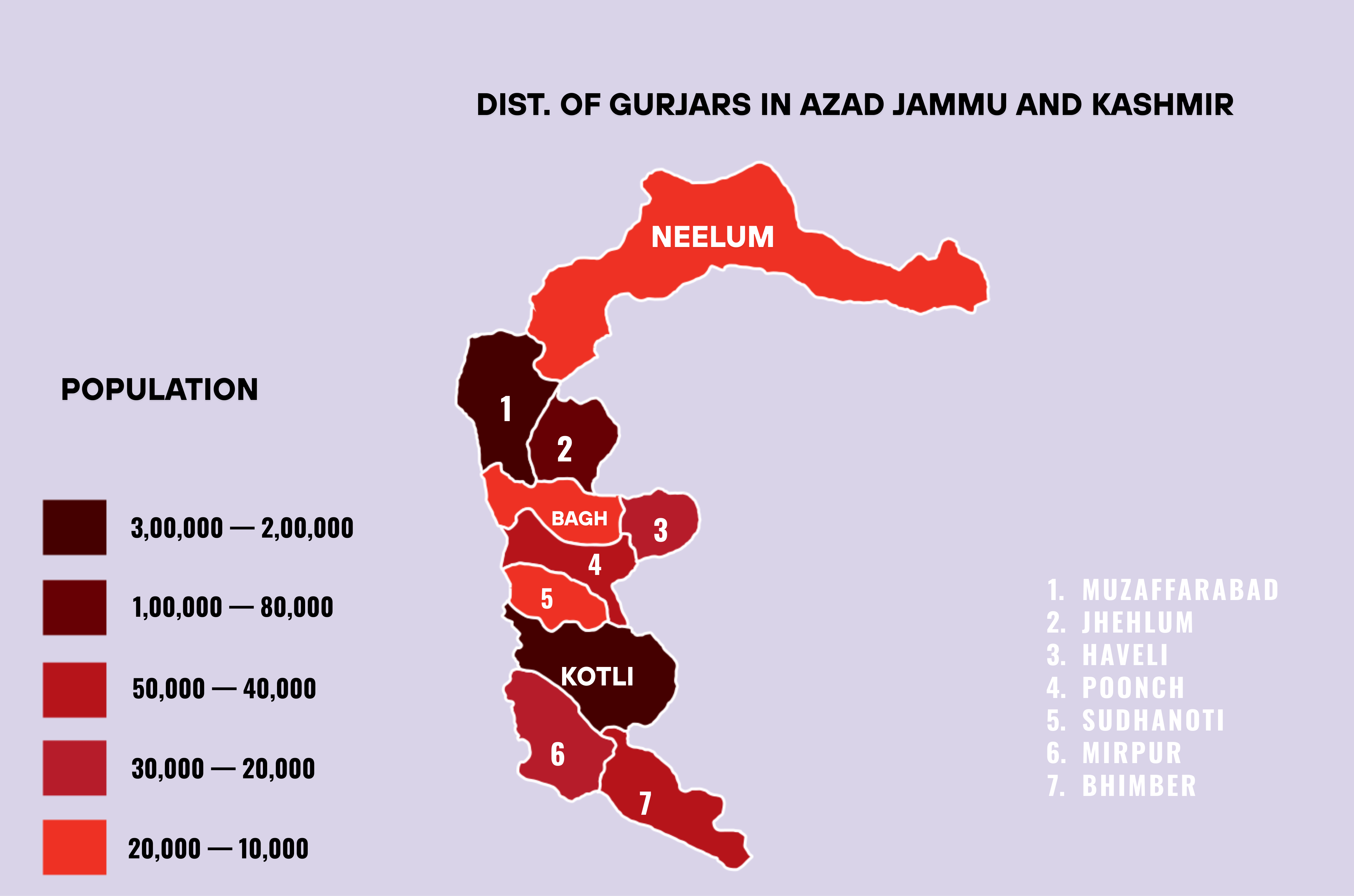

In Azad Kashmir, Gujjar is the single largest ethnic and are widely found in Muzaffarabad, Poonch, and Mirpur divisions. They are found in all ten districts of Azad Kashmir and constitutes as a major ethnic group in the districts except in Sudhanoti District. Their population in Azad Kashmir is reached to 8,00,000 and they make up 20% of the entire population of AJK.

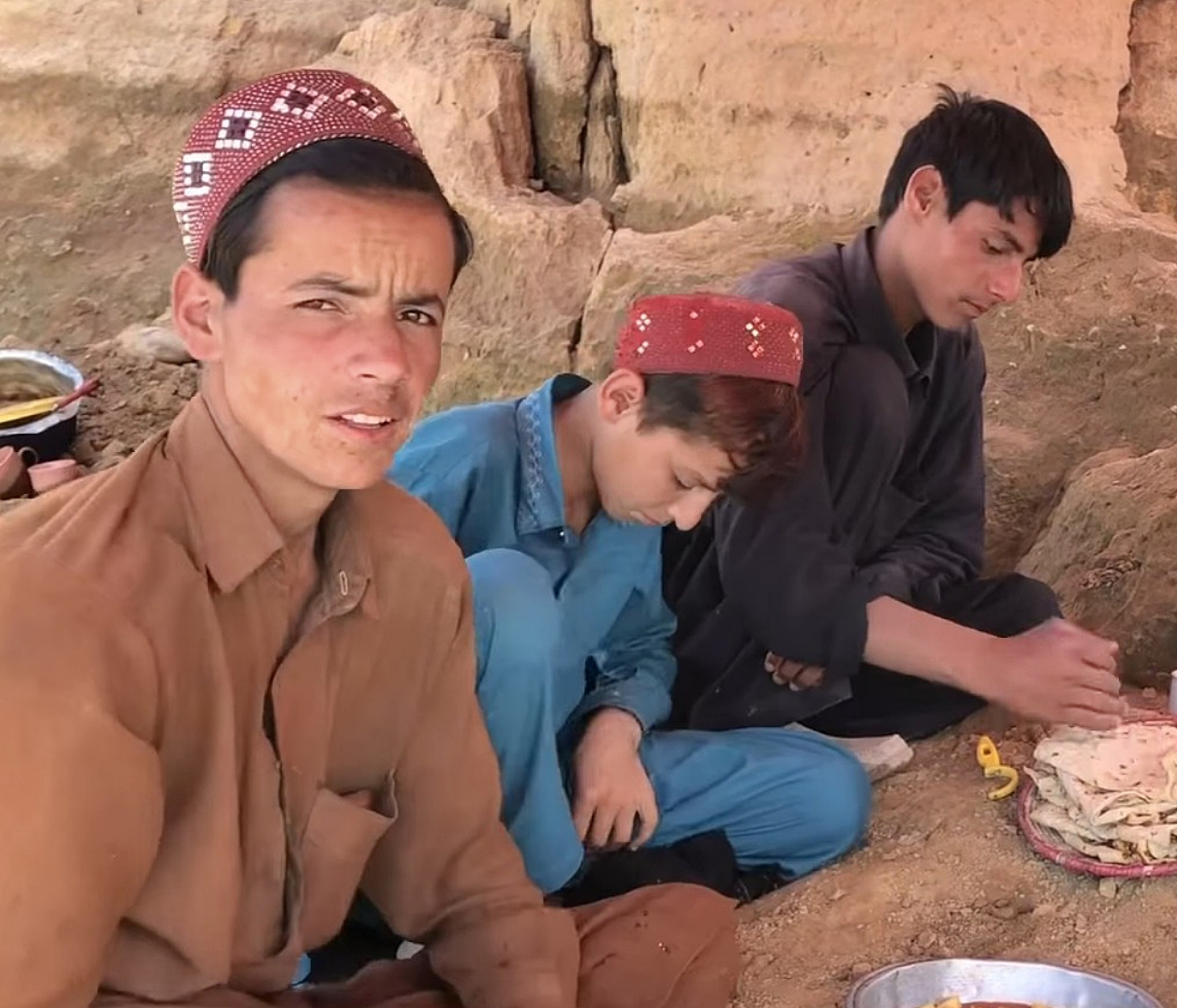
Three Gujjar brothers from Azad Jammu and Kashmir, Pakistan

Gujjars made up a significant portion of the population in several districts of Azad Jammu and Kashmir: 35% for Muzaffarabad, Kotli and Hattian Bala (Jehlum) districts, 30% for Haveli district and 10% for Neelum and Mirpur districts.

==== Historical population ====
Population of Gujjars recorded in different census reports of the British India for present-day Pakistan administrated Azad Jammu and Kashmir.

Historical population
Year	Pop.	±% p.a.
1901	77,612	—
1911	62,287	−2.18%
1921	81,031	+2.67%
1931	81,763	+0.09%
source: 1901 census - 1911 census - 1921 census - 1931 census

=== Gilgit-Baltistan ===
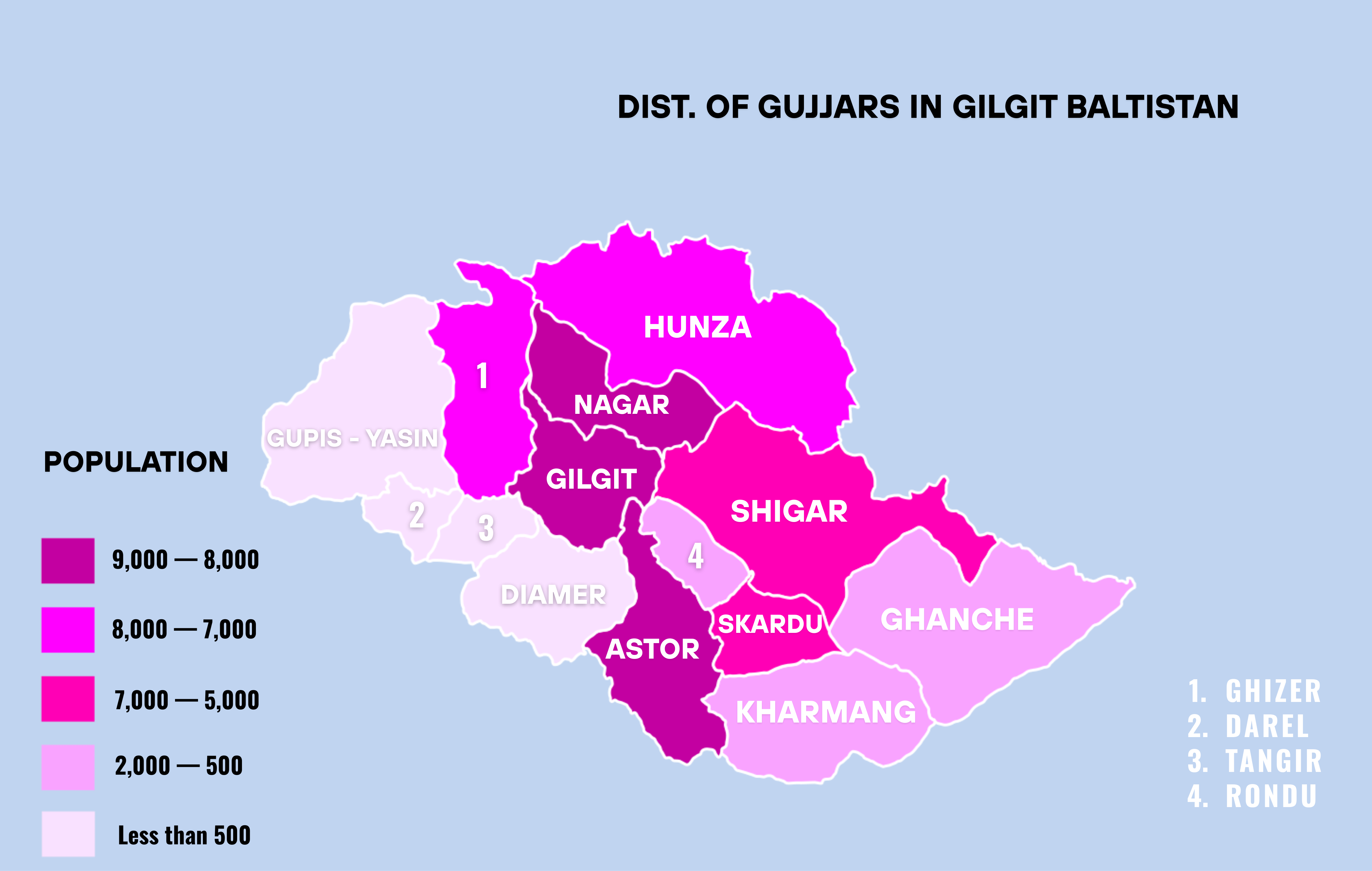

In Gilgit-Baltistan, Gujjars are the sixth or seventh largest ethnic group of the region. They are found in all three divisions: Gilgit, Diamer, and Baltistan. Most of their population live in the districts of Astore, Ghizer, Nagar, Shigar, Gilgit, Hunza, Skardu, Kharmang, Ghanche, and Naltar.

The Gujjars in Gilgit Valley likely came from Kashmir and Baltistan, along with the Dom people. They mostly speak Gujari as mother tongue, while some speak regional languages including Balti, Khowar and Shina.

The Gurjars in Gilgit-Baltistan have been residing in the high mountain valleys where Shina speaking (Shinaikis) people live, for at least eight generations, and it is believe they initially migrated from Baltistan.

==== Historical population ====
Population of Gujjars recorded in different census reports of the British India for present-day Pakistan administrated Gilgit-Baltistan.

Historical population
Year	Pop.	±% p.a.
1901	2,032	—
1911	3,018	+4.04%
1921	3,507	+1.51%
1931	3,098	−1.23%
source: 1901 census - 1911 census - 1921 census - 1931 census

=== Jammu and Kashmir ===
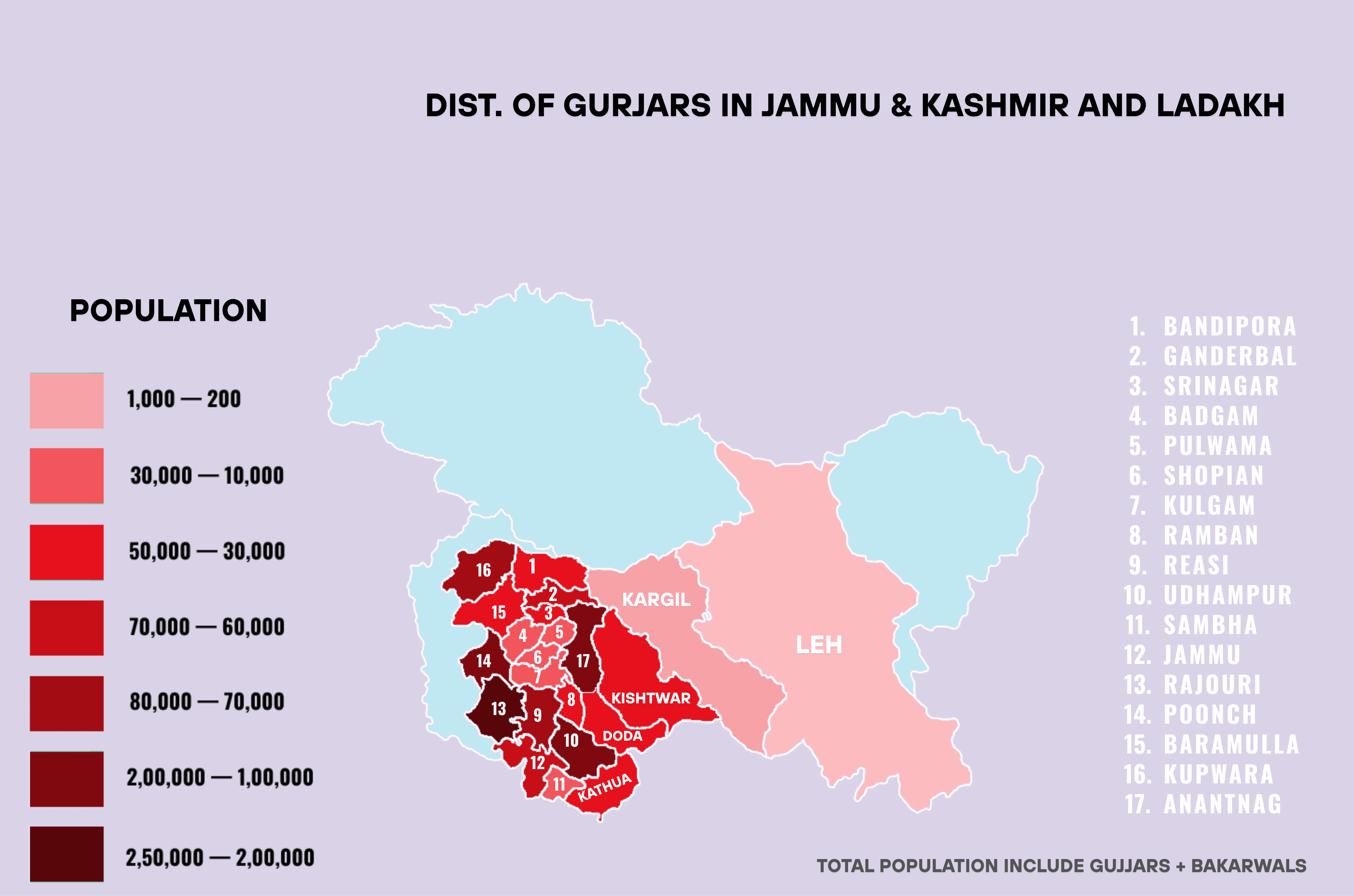

Gurjar is the third largest ethnic in Jammu and Kashmir. They found across in all valleys and districts of Indian administrated Jammu and Kashmir. In Kashmir division and Kashmir Valley Gujjar is the second largest ethnic group and in the Jammu division and Chenab Valley they are the third largest ethnic group. They make up 53% of the total population of Pir Pir Panjar Range, 35% for Chenab Valley, 23% for greater Himalayas and 15% for lesser Himalayas in Jammu and Kashmir.

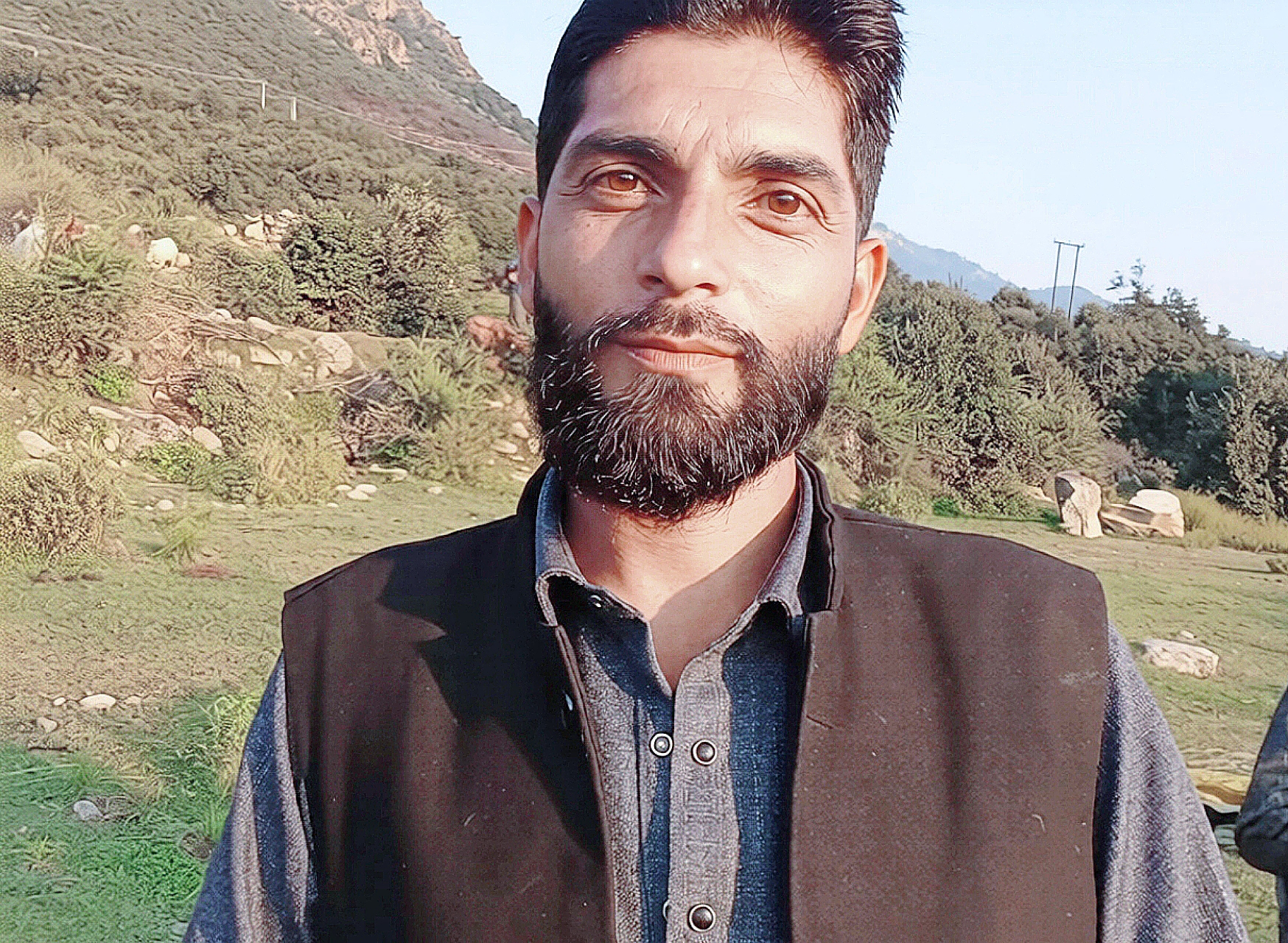
A Gurjar man from Jammu and Kashmir

Gujjars made up a significant portion of the population in several districts of Jammu and Kashmir (union territory): Poonch 40.39%, Rajouri 35.17%, Reasi 25.6%, Ganderbal 20.21%, Kishtwar 14.36%, Ramban 12.18% and Anantnag 11.46%.

In Jammu and Kashmir Gurjar community constitute more than 20% of Kashmir and Kashmir's total population. As of now, their population in Jammu and Kashmir is approximately 15,00,000.

In the 2011 census of India the population of Gujari-speaking Gurjars and Bakarwals of Jammu and Kashmir was recorded at 11,70,054.

==== Historical population ====
Population of Gujjars recorded in different census reports of the British India for present-day Indian administrated Jammu and Kashmir.

Historical population
Year	Pop.	±% p.a.
1901	206,138	—
1911	262,613	+2.45%
1921	277,624	+0.56%
1931	317,920	+1.36%
source: 1901 census - 1911 census - 1921 census - 1931 census

The population of Gujjars and Bakarwals recorded in different census reports of India for present-day Indian-administrated Jammu and Kashmir and Ladakh union territories.

Historical population
Year	Pop.	±% p.a.
1981	469,000	—
2001	824,530	+2.86%
2011	1,170,054	+3.56%
source: 1981 census - 2001 census - 2011 census

=== Ladakh ===
In Ladakh union territory Gurjar is a minority ethnic group mainly found in the Zanskar, Leh, Nubra, and Kargil districts. They're also found in the Khalsi area of Sham district. Most the Gujjars in Ladakh are migrated from Jammu and Kashmir.

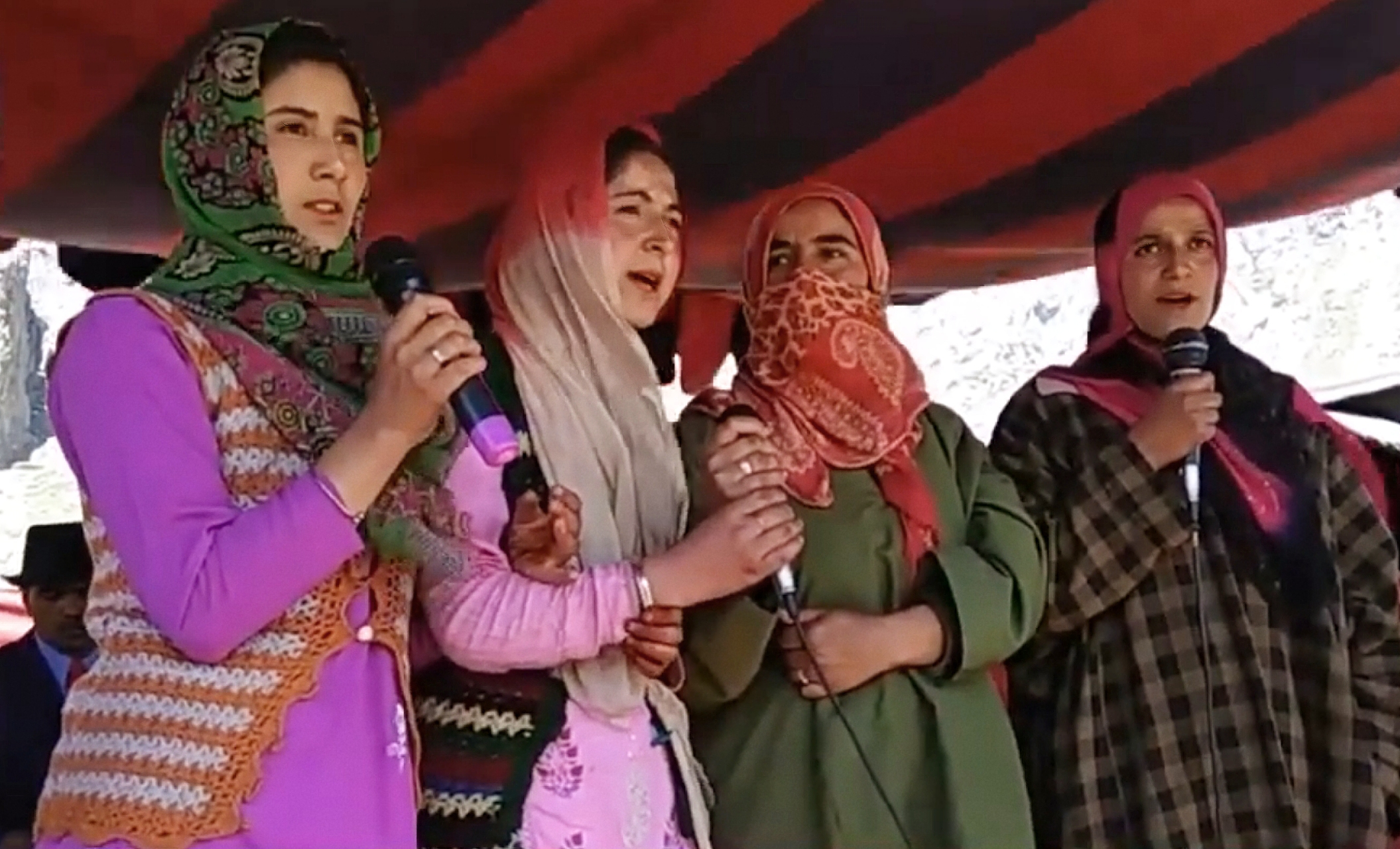
Three Gurjar girls singing songs in local Gujjar festival in Kargil district of Ladakh

In the 2011 census of India the population of Gujari-speaking Gurjars and Bakarwals of Ladakh (union territory) recorded at less than 200.

In Rangdum area, Gujjars and Bakarwals face land disputes. People are taking over grazing land and building without permission. In 2024 the government of Ladakh tried to resolve these issues.

==== Historical population ====
Population of Gujjars recorded in different census reports of the British India for present-day Indian administrated Ladakh.

Historical population
Year	Pop.	±% p.a.
1901	2,000	—
1911	85	−27.08%
1921	15	−15.92%
2011	154	+2.62%
source: 1901 census - 1911 census - 1921 census - 2011 census

== Religion ==
Gurjars of Kashmir region are all Muslim and they belong to the Sunni sect of Islam.

It is generally believed that Gurjars were sun worshipers and they were devotees of Solar deity. According to historian M.K. Kennedy, the Gujjars of Kashmir were originally Sun worshipers, before adopting Hinduism.

=== Conversion to Islam ===
The Gujjars and Bakerwals of Kashmir region adopted Islam in the 16th century during the rule of Mughal emperor Aurangzeb in Indian subcontinent.

== Subdivisions ==
Gurjars and Bakarwals of Kashmir are subdivided into various subgroups based on their occupation. Gurjars of Jammu and Kashmir are subdivided into divisions: Settled (landlord) Gujjars, semi-settled Gujjars and landless (nomad) Gujjars. Nomad Gujjars are further divided into subgroups: Bakarwal, Banjara and Dodhi Gujjars.

=== Zamindar/settled Gujjars ===
Zamindar (landlord) or settled Gujjars in Azad Kashmir and Jammu and Kashmir are those who own land and their main occupation is agriculture. The Gujjars who mainly do farming crops like maize, and wheat, and stay in one place are known as settled or Muqami Gujjars. These Muqami Gujjars live in houses that are typically called Kothas or Bandi. In Kashmir they are also known as "Basneeks" or Basneeks Gujjars.

=== Semi-settled ===
Semi-settled or semi-sedentary Gujjars are those live near high pastures, farming and raising animals. They move to higher lands in summer for grazing their livestock.

=== Nomad/landless Gujjars ===
==== Banihara ====
Among nomadic Gujjars, Banihara or Dodhi Gujjars are those tend Buffalo, sell milk and milk products.

==== Bakarwals ====
Among nomadic Gujjars, Bakarwals are those who rear and sell sheep and goats.

The Bakarwal tribe has two main groups: Kunhari and illahiwal. The Kunhari Bakarwals are believed to come from Kunhar valley from swat, Pakistan and the illahiwal Bakarwals are linked to Pakistan's Illahiwal region.

==== Banjara Gujjars ====
Banjara Gujjars are those who wanders in the forests (jungle) of Himalayas in Jammu and Kashmir.

=== Clans ===
The names of the clans (gotras) are the same for Hindu Gurjars, Sikh Gurjars, and Muslim Gurjars in the Indian Sub-continent. Some Gurjar clans claim to be descended from famous historical figures, philosophers, and warriors and they also believe that their gotra (clan) is better that the others.

In Indian-administrated Jammu and Kashmir, there are almost 150 clans or Gotras of Gurjars, out of a total around nine hundred Gurjar clans scattered across the Indian Sub-continent.

Gurjars, Bakarwals and Banihara/Dodhi Gujjars in Jammu and Kashmir are divided into various clans each clan has their own Mukkadham and council of Panchayat (Jirga). Some of the notable clans include:

- Awana or (Awan)
- Bajjar
- Bajran
- Bhatti (Bhati)
- Chechi
- Kushan (Kasana)
- Bhadana
- Khatana
- Bokan
- Baniya
- Berger (Bargar)
- Bigyal
- Lassana
- Ladi or (Ladhi)
- Checki
- Tienda or (Tinda)
- Gorsi
- Banth
- Baru
- Meelu or (Mehlu)
- Poswal
- Phambra
- Bhalesar
- Barwal
- Bogri or (Bagri)
- Chauhan (Chohan)
- Chockar
- Chopra
- Khari
- Kohli
- Chabra
- Chad
- Doi
- Deda (Dedhar)
- Rathore
- Dahder
- Gegi
- Hakla
- Jagal
- Kandhal
- Khaiper
- Khan
- Kalas
- Lodha or (Lohda)
- Mehsi
- Munder
- Mukri
- Noon
- Nagar
- Pore (Por)
- Sangu or (Sango/Sago)
- Pundir
- Sood (Sud)
- Thikariya (Thikaria)
- Mair
- Mandhar (Mandar)
- Qureshi
- Tass
- Lone
- Manhas
- Mir
- Moti
- Mooner
- Plaser
- Pathan
- Rather
- Sheikh
- Thakiyal

== Culture ==
=== Attire ===
Gujjars like wearing their traditional clothes and jewellery. Gujjar men mostly wear salwar kameez, their outfits include a loose kameez, colorful waistcoat with buttons, tahmund, small chadder, white turban, and special shoes with iron nails.

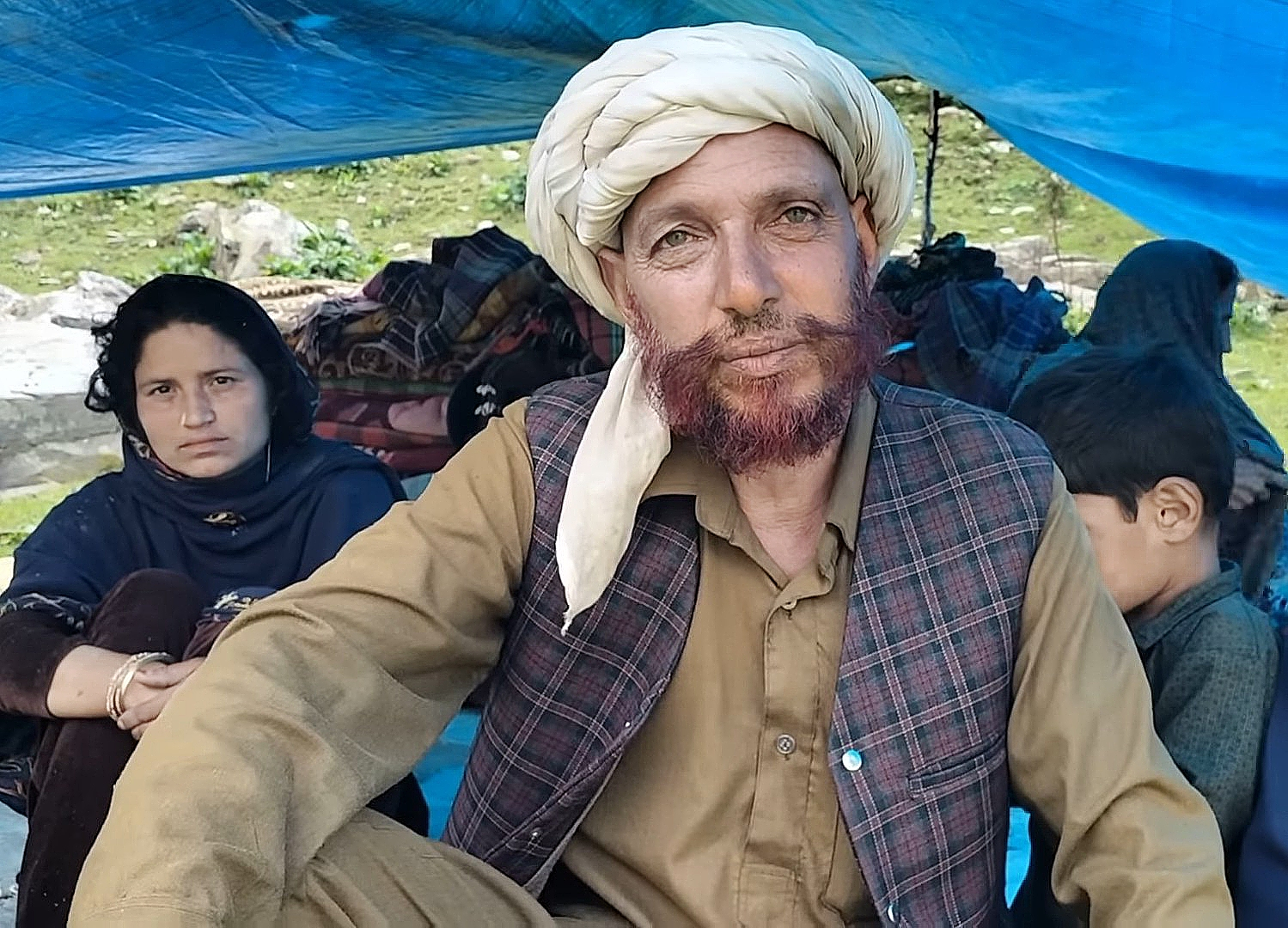
A Gujjar man with his wife and son from Jammu and Kashmir, India (wearing typical Salwar-Kameez with waistcoat & turban and women wearing Salwar-kameez & covering head with Dupata)

Gujjar women are also known as Mehri or Gurjarani. Gujjar women in Kashmir mostly wore salwar and a loose-sleeved, full-skirted tunic. They covered their heads with a thick veil and braided their hair into multiple plaits that hung down, partly covering their faces. Women's outfits include loose kurtas with buttons and embroidery, block suthen, colorful duppat, and a round cap with a long tail.

=== Art and craft ===
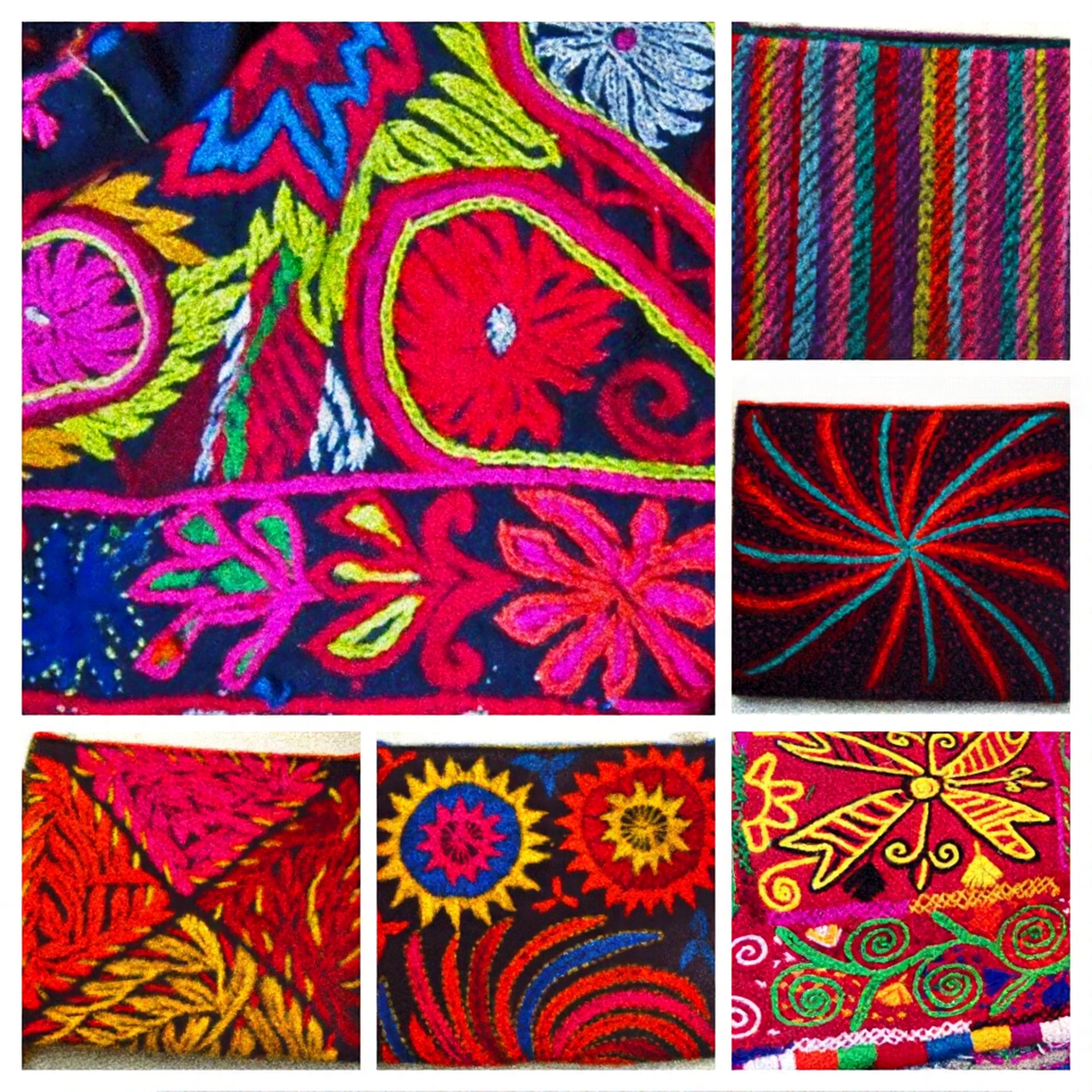
Craft of Gurjars from Azad Kashmir, Jammu and Kashmir and Gilgit-Baltistan.

In regions like Azad Kashmir, Gilgit-Baltistan, Ladakh, and Jammu and Kashmir, Gurjar women are skilled at making their own clothes, bags, caps, and thread. They typically use patterns and vibrant colors like pink, red, yellow, orange, green, blue, for embroidery. Their techniques include stem stitch, chain stitch, hem stitch, and bead work. To add an extra touch of beauty, they often use patchwork with bright colors on black fabric, making their creations more eye-catching.

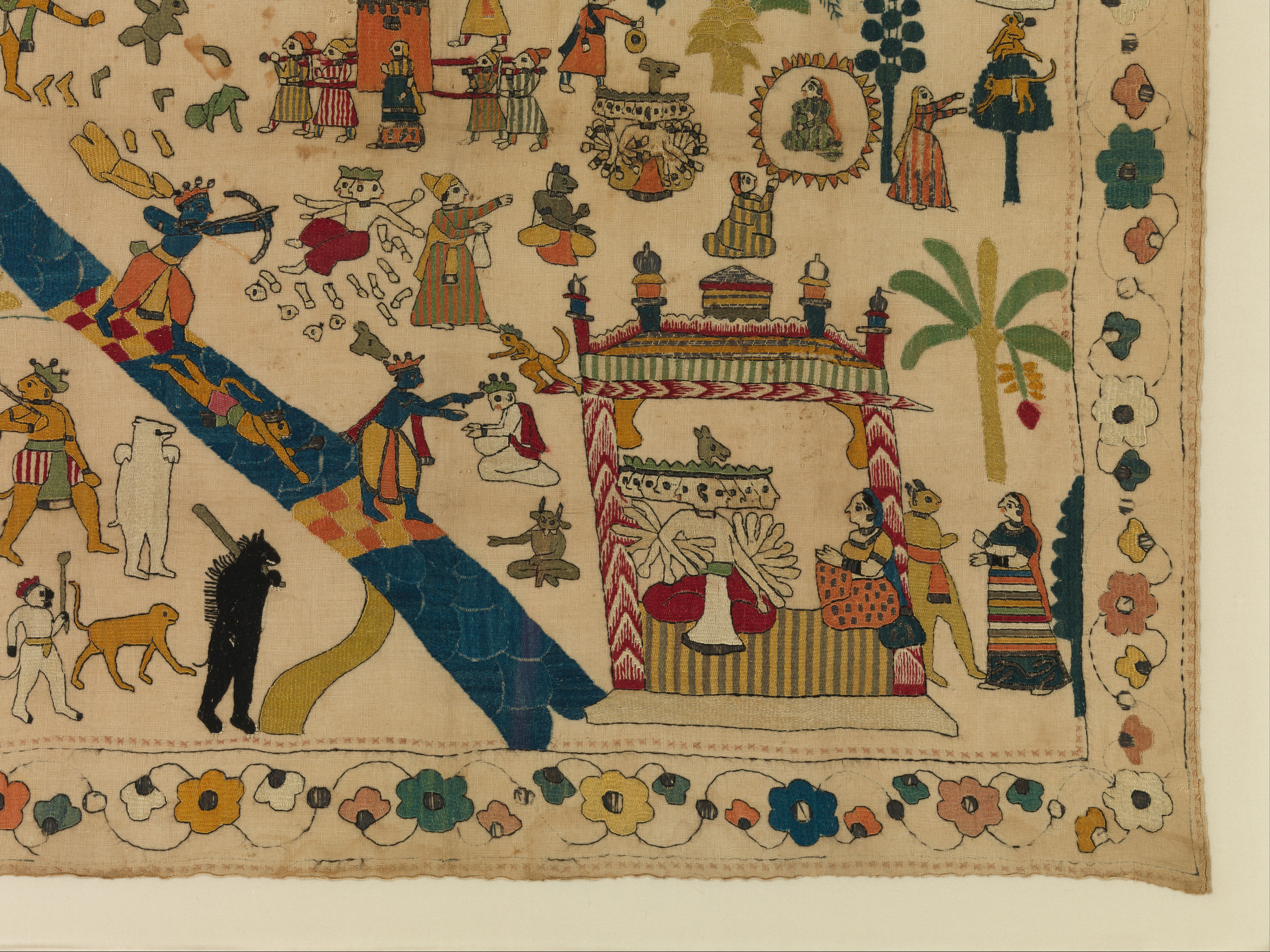
Textile embroidery from Jammu and Kashmir, India.

Additionally, Gujjar women play a role in Kashmiri textile production by supplying colored yarns to local weavers, who then create shawls, blankets, and other fabrics for their use, highlighting their involvement in traditional craftsmanship. These ornaments, along with goat hair and leather, are sold to generate income for the Tribal Gujjar community. Often, they exchange goods instead of using money, similar to a barter system. The Gujjar women not only add decorative touches to their products but also style their hair in intricate braids and adorn it with ornamental clips, showcasing their creativity and flair.

==== Kani Shawl ====
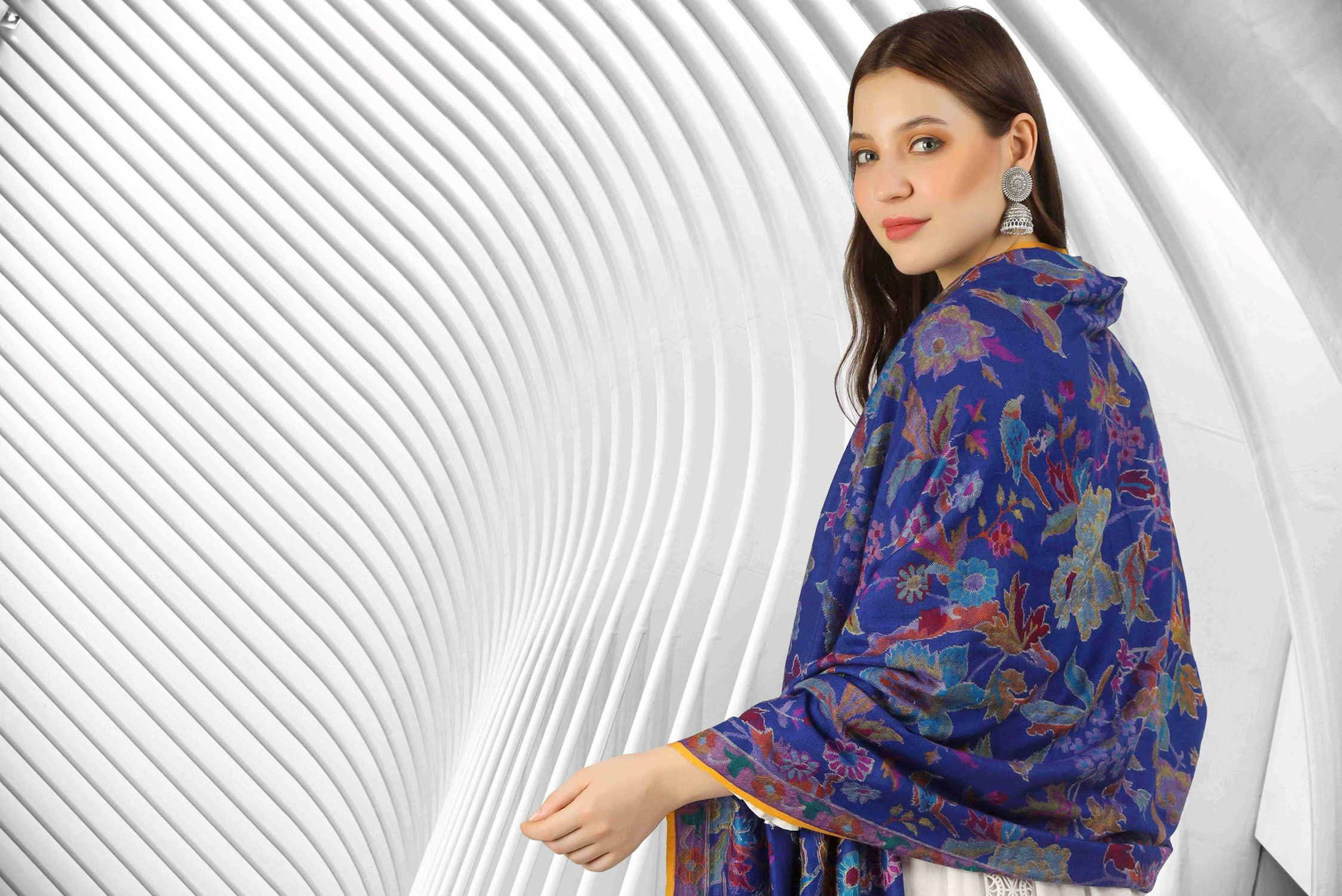
A woman wearing Kani Shawl from Jammu and Kashmir.

Kani Shawl weaving is a traditional craft from Jammu and Kashmir, mainly practiced by the Gujjar community. These shawls are famous for their beautiful patterns and high-quality wool, often featuring designs inspired by nature and Kashmiri art. Kani Shawls are made on a handloom using Pashmina and wooden needles. Small wooden sticks (kanis) create the intricate designs, with each stick representing one knot. Weavers follow a graph paper design to get the pattern right. Skilled Gujjar weavers create intricate patterns using various colors and techniques. Kani Shawls are treasured for their elegance and craftsmanship, showcasing the Gujjar tribe's connection to their heritage and Kashmir's old artistic traditions.

=== Jewellery ===
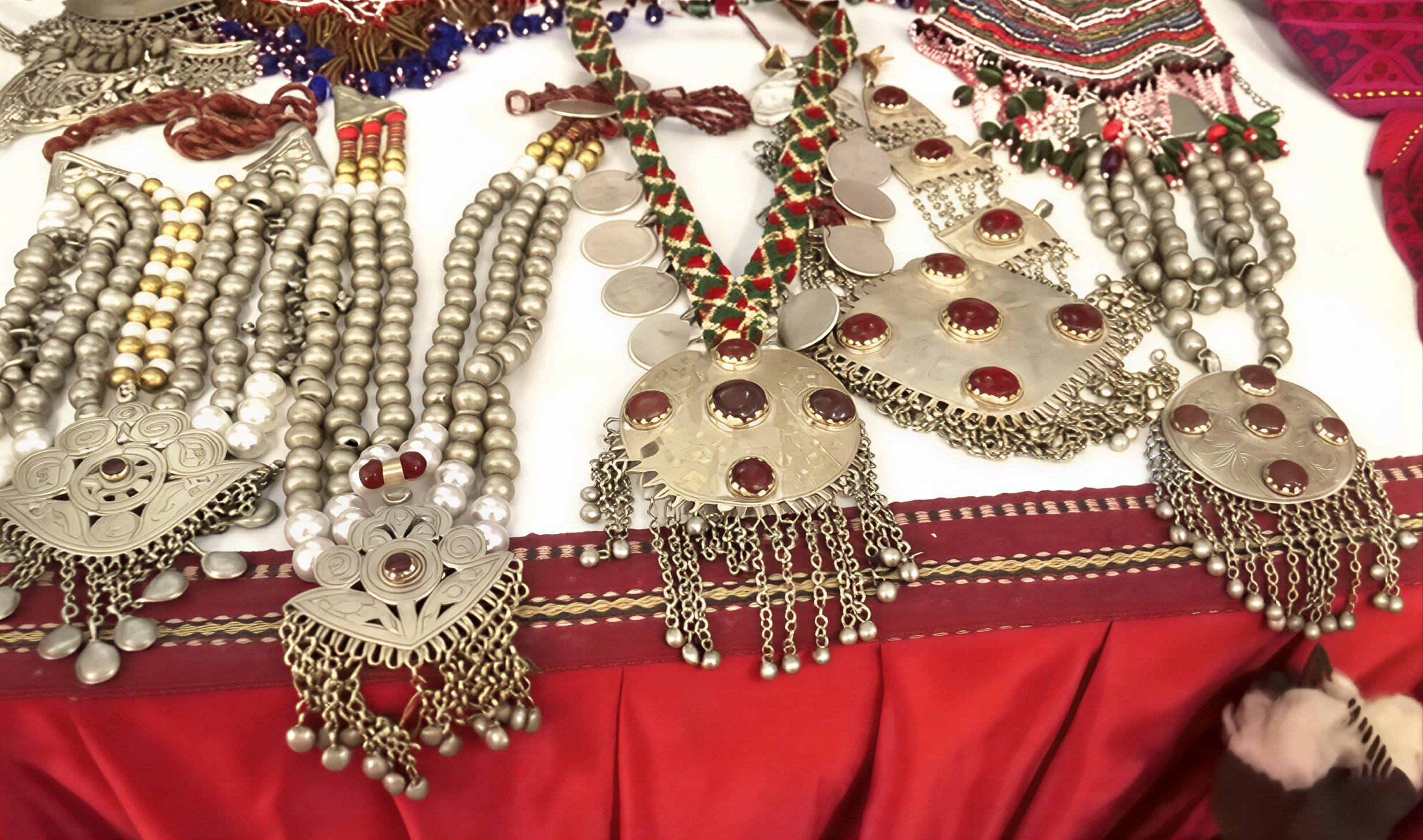
Traditional jewelry of Gurjar women from Kashmir region.

They love wearing heavy jewellery like kangan, karras, seheeri, mahail, loung, and bails made from gold and silver. The hair style of Gujjar women is also very unique - they weave their hair into many plaits, which takes a whole day. They only undo their hair once a month to wash it.

==== Bead jewelry ====
Gurjar women in Kashmir region also wear another type of jewelry made of using different colorful beads, which stands out because of its bright colors and unique designs.

==== Duldo ====
Gujjar women wear a special necklace called Duldo, which is considered their valuable ornament. It is made of three strings with silver beads, and has bells and chains hanging from it, weighing around 30 tolas (360 grams).

==== Nose ring ====
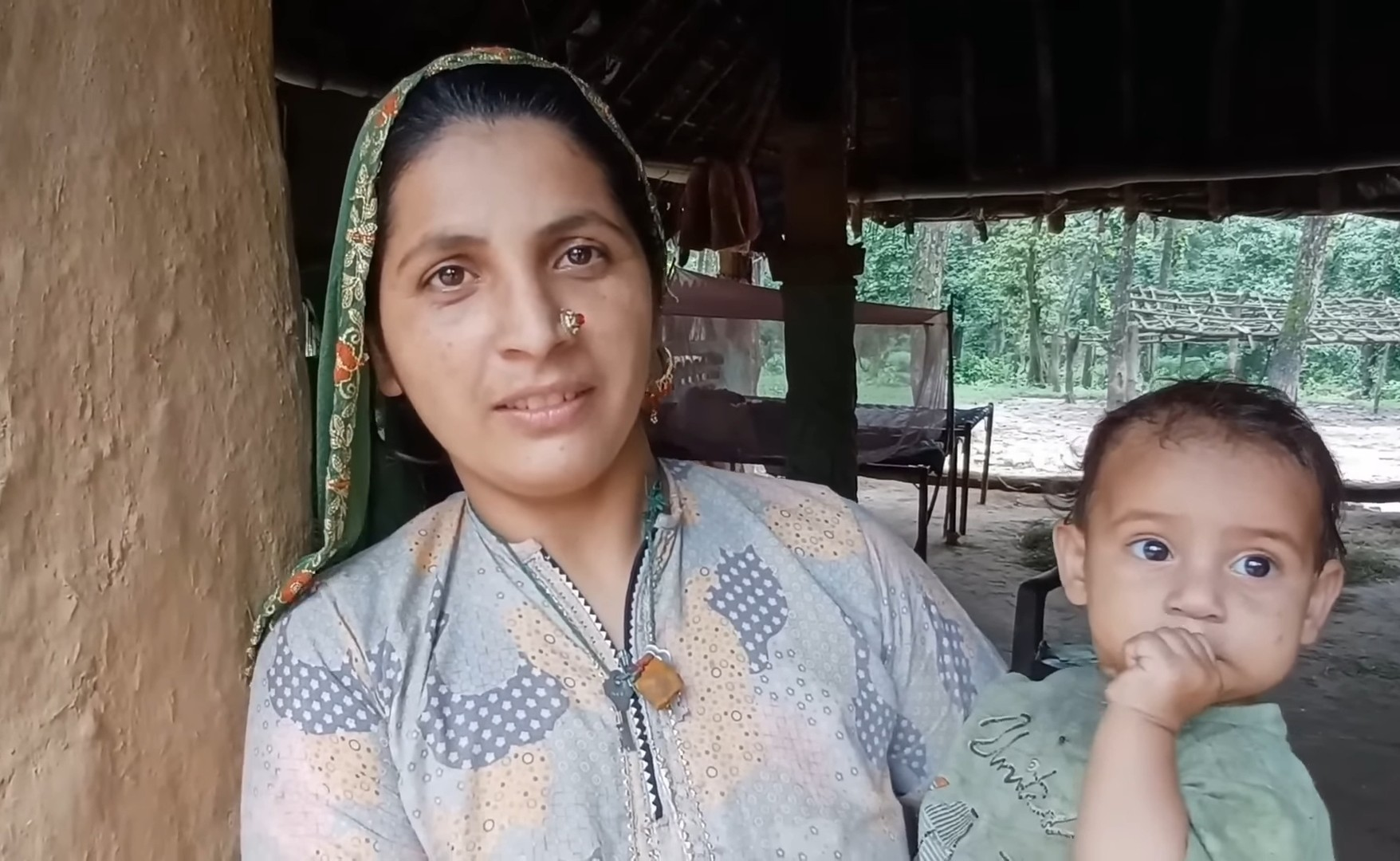
A tribal Van Gurjar woman wearing big nose ring from Uttarakhand, India.

The Gurjar women wear a nose ring, typically made of a gold or silver with a central stone, which is referred to as Dunli or Laong (long). They also wear a smaller nose ring called Tilo or Konka.

=== Cap/hat ===
==== Lachka cap ====
Gujjar women and kids wear a special cap called Lachka or Lachko. It is a fitted cap with a flat that covers the back of the neck. Skilled crafters decorate it with patterns like circles, triangles, and wavy lines. The cap is also adorned with things like coins, buttons, charms, shells, and beads, making it look really pretty.

==== Dayani Gujari ====
In Gilgit-Baltistan, the Gujjar tribal women wears a special traditional cap called Gujari or Dayani Gujari cap. It is a unique cap that covers hair, has embroidery, and sometimes even jewellery attached.

=== Dance ===
==== Rouf dance ====
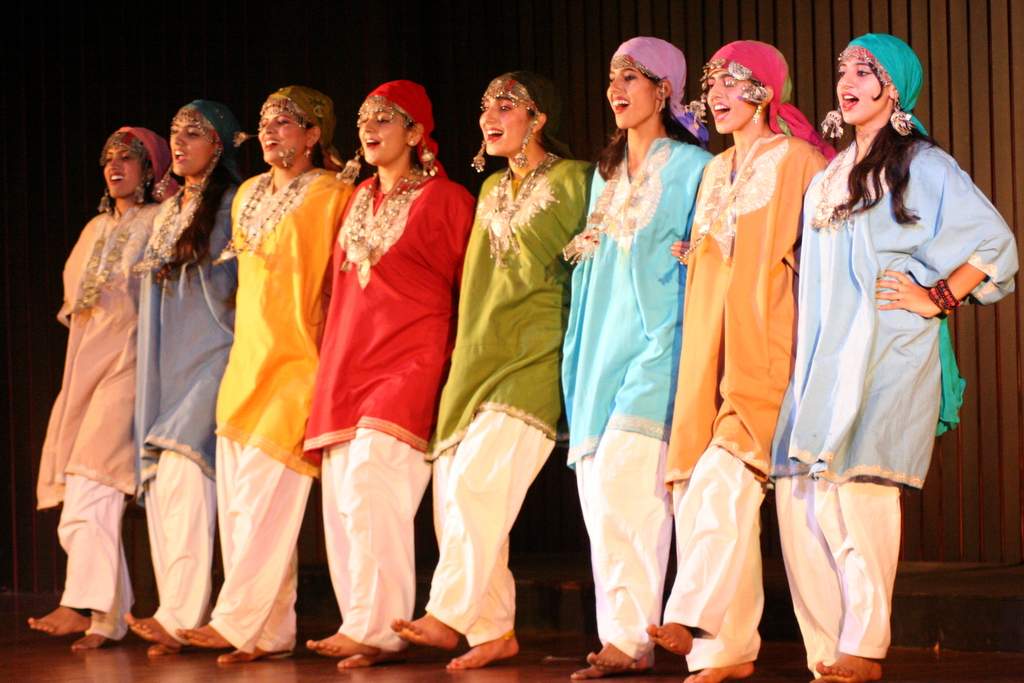
A group of Kashmiri women performing Rouf dance from Jammu and Kashmir.

Rauf dance is a traditional dance performed by the Gujjar community in Jammu and Kashmir during cultural festivals. The dance features rhythmic movements and traditional music from instruments and dhol. Colorfully dressed performers move in sync, often acting out rural scenes and seasonal changes. It showcases the Gujjar community's culture, joy and spirit.

==== Koonjariye dance ====
'Koonjariye' (or Gojri) is a Gojri dance performed by the Gurjar community in Jammu and Kashmir. The dance is connected to the community's pastoral way of life in hilly areas. It shows a scene in which a Gurjar woman speaks to a bird from the hills and asks it to fly across the mountains to look for her partner. Gojri dance is part of the cultural practices of Gurjars.

=== Folk music ===
In many cultures, birds have been important symbols for humans for a very long time. They often represent freedom, because they can fly to places people cannot reach. Bird songs and calls are also seen as signs of good and bad events, and they often carry messages that matter to a community. Gujari folklore songs helps preserve their culture, beliefs, and values, and often used animals to teach moral lessons about human-nature relationships. Gurjars are flexible in both religious matters and the secular traditions they follow. The Gujari folk literature is very rich. It includes folk songs for occasions of both joy and sorrow. There are also some similarities between Gujari folk songs of Gujars of Kashmir with Gujarati folk songs.

Gurjars usually sing folk songs in groups. Some Gujari folk songs include Kuku, Sahafi, Rubai, Bolo Maiya, Baisakhi, Marital song, Jogiya, Mehndi, and Dhol.

==== Bait ====
Bait is a popular type of Gujari music. It is usually performed at a high pitch and one complete Bait must be sung in four breaths. A Si-Harfi of BaraMah takes longer and needs eight breeths. Due to Islamic influence, traditional Gujari music has very little use of instruments and is mostly vocal.

==== Baar ====
Baar or War is a type of folk Gujari music about bravery and folk heroes. These ballads cover topics like love stories and battles. They are sung with great energy and are very popular. Professional singers called Perri or Mirasi perform them. They often play instruments like Sarangi and sometimes drums.

==== Boliyan ====
Boliyan are traditional Gujari songs. Mainly Gujjar farmers sing these songs in groups while working to maintain rhythm and reduce fatigue. They are performed in a call-and-response style, where a leader sings a line and others respond, or two groups alternate lines.

==== Geet ====
Geet are general Gujari songs that do not fit into a specific category. They include songs for weddings, separation, harvest, brides, lullabies, and nature. Most Geet are vocal only. Gurjar women usually sing them together on different occasions. Some common Geet are Babul, Doli, Sohag, Lalla, and Panjhri.

==== Kuku song ====
In Gujari folk tradition, 'kuku' is an oral song popular among Gurjar and Bakarwal communities in Jammu and Kashmir. The main theme of the song is remembrance. In it, the cuckoo's song tells about the struggles and life of tribal people. The cuckoo in 'kuku' represents themes such as migration, resilience, endurance, and the connection between people and nature. Similar bird imagery also appears in folk tradition from other cultures, where birds are often shown as messenger and symbols of freedom. Because of this, 'kuku' shares themes found beyond the region.

==== Saharfi ====
Saharfi is a Gujjar folk song style found and sung only in Kashmir. Each verses starts with a different letter of the Persian alphabet, from Alif to Yay. The song has a simple tune and a slow rhythm.

==== Rubai song ====
Rubai is a Gujjar folk song with the first two couplets matching. It talks about planting mangoes and pepper but losing the harvest to other. The song expresses pain over wasted effort and asks people not to harm them, trusting God as the only provider.

==== Balo and Maiya ====
Balo and Maiya are slow folk songs sung in Punjab and by Gurjars in Kashmir region in Gujari language. Both are songs about missing someone remembering them with love and sadness.

==== Tribal Art Museum ====
The Kashmir Tribal Arts Society Museum (KTASM) is the first community-run museum in the Kashmir valley. It was started in 2020 in Bandipore district by a Gurjar woman named Shahida Khanam. The museum preserves Gojri heritage by displaying everyday tribal items like jewellery, charka spining wheels, blankets, and utensils in mud shelves instead of glass cases. It also trains local girl in traditional crafts like embroidery and tailoring to help Gujari culture alive.

=== Language ===
In Jammu and Kashmir, Azad Kashmir, Gilgit-Baltistan and Ladakh Gurjars and Bakarwal are multi-lingual communities, they speak their own Gujari language with various regional languages, including Kashmiri, Pahari, Dogri, Balti, Shina, and Urdu. Gurjar community in Kashmir have their own Gujari literature and music. The DD Kashir Channel on Doorsarshan broadcasts a Gujari programme. Gojari programs are also available on All India Radio Kashmir.

In the 2011 census of India for Jammu and Kashmir, there were 11,70,054 Gujari speakers in the state. In 2020 census of Azad Jammu and Kashmir there were approximately 8,00,000 Gujari speaking Gujjars.

==== Film ====
In recent years some film were produced in Gujari language in Jammu and Kashmir, India. In 2021 the first Gujari film "Malli Gujjari" was released. It was written by Dr Javaid Rahi, directed by Qayoom Raja and produced by Neeru Raina. The film, about women's empowerment in tribal culture, was well received by the audience, mostly Gujjar youth and community leaders. It tells the story of 'Malli Gujjari', a brave woman who received the Kirti Chakra award. Th film features local actors and uses authentic Gujari language and proverbs. Other films in language, like 2024 film Noor Pari (2024) and 2021 film Darshi (2021), were also released in Pakistan.

=== Food ===
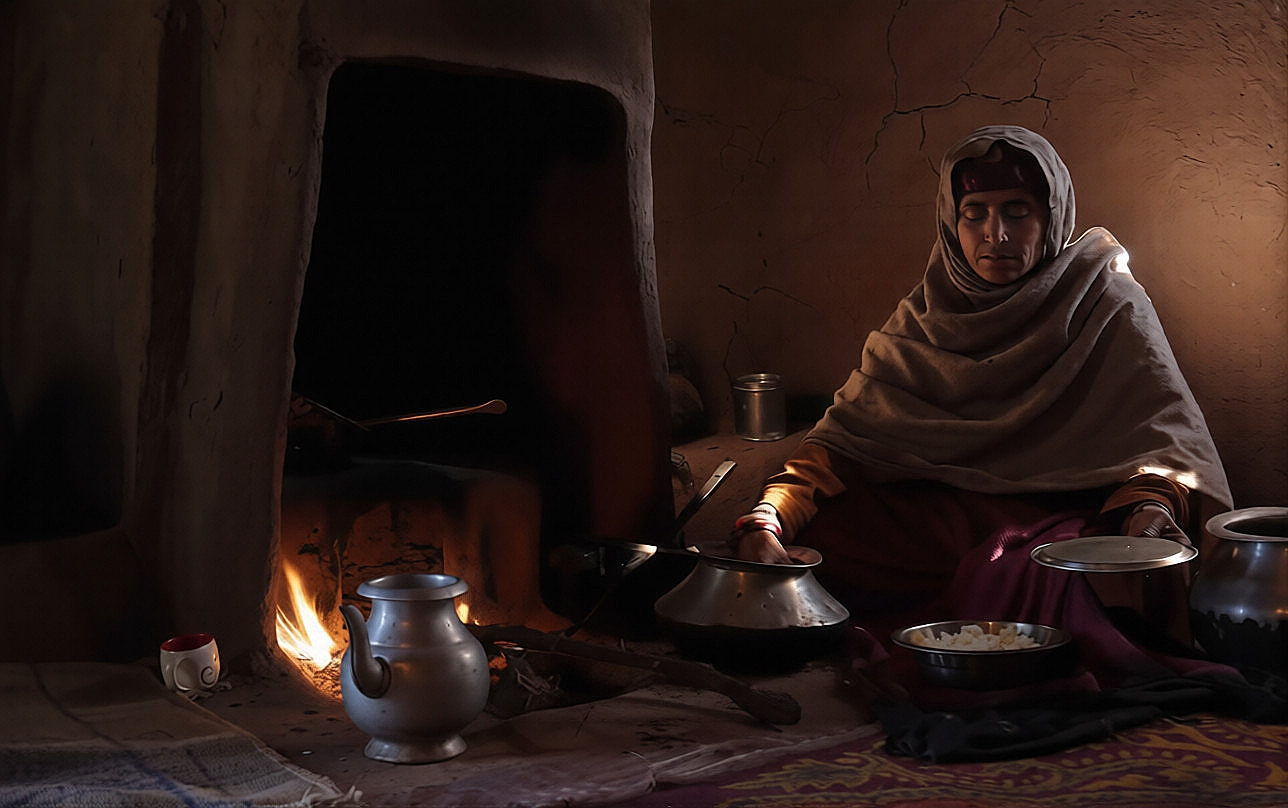
A Gujjar woman preparing food in Kashmir Valley, Jammu and Kashmir, India

Most kashmiri Gurjars are vegetarian. Their diet mainly consists of vegetables and dairy products. They mainly eat 'makki ki roti' or Chapati of grain floor, grains, wheat, and maize. Their main dietary sources are milk, grain, Lassi, Kalari, Karam, Ganhar, ghee, and lassi. They rarely cook vegetables or dal. They also eat Sarson ka Saag with butter and desi ghee.

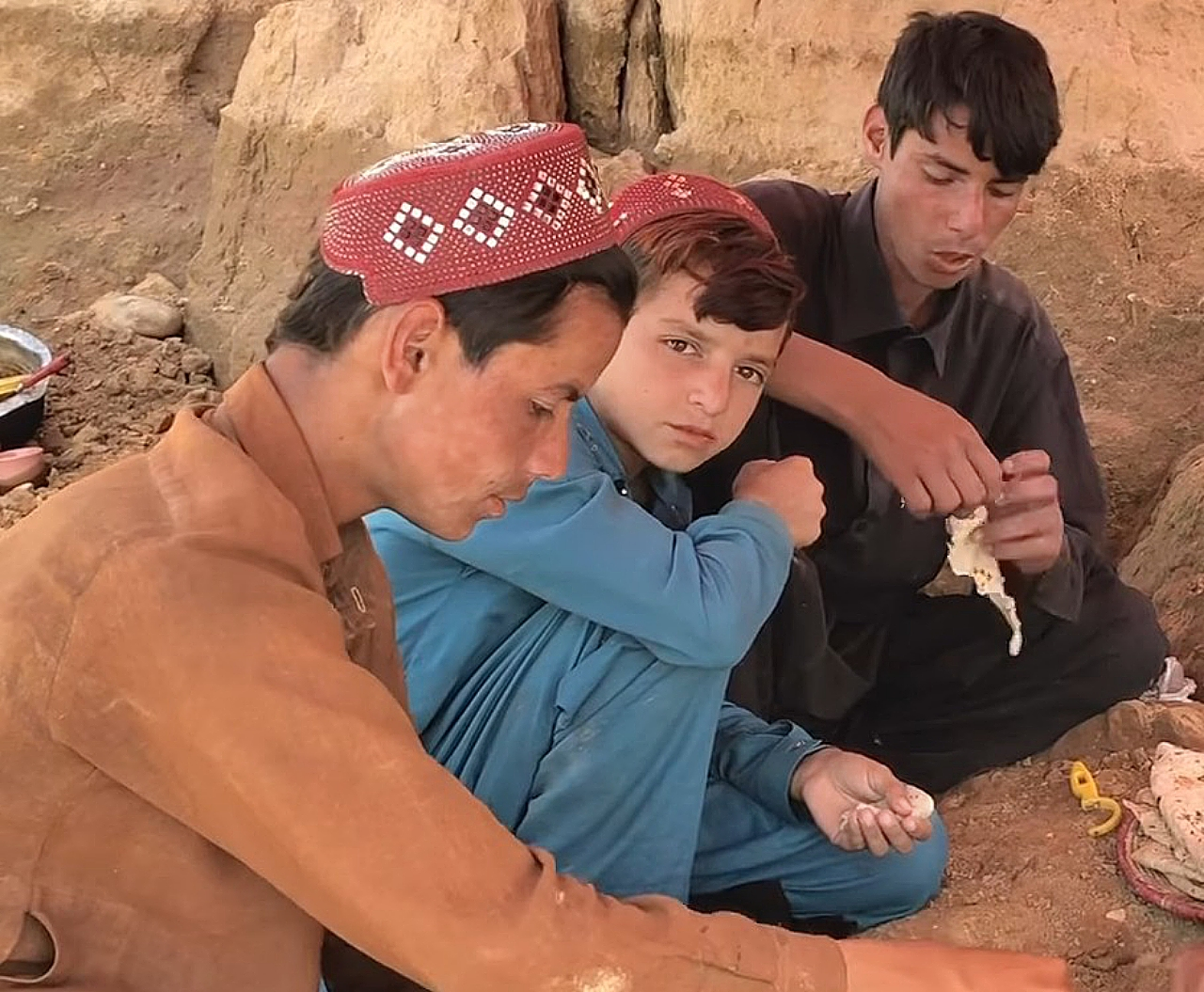
Three Gujjar brothers from Azad Kashmir eating Roti (Chapati)

They also eat a lot of veggie stuff like rice, veggies, greens, flatbread, and dry fruits. And they love having Kashmiri wazwan on special days like Eid, Urs, and when they are celebrating a boy's circumcision.

==== Kalari cheese ====
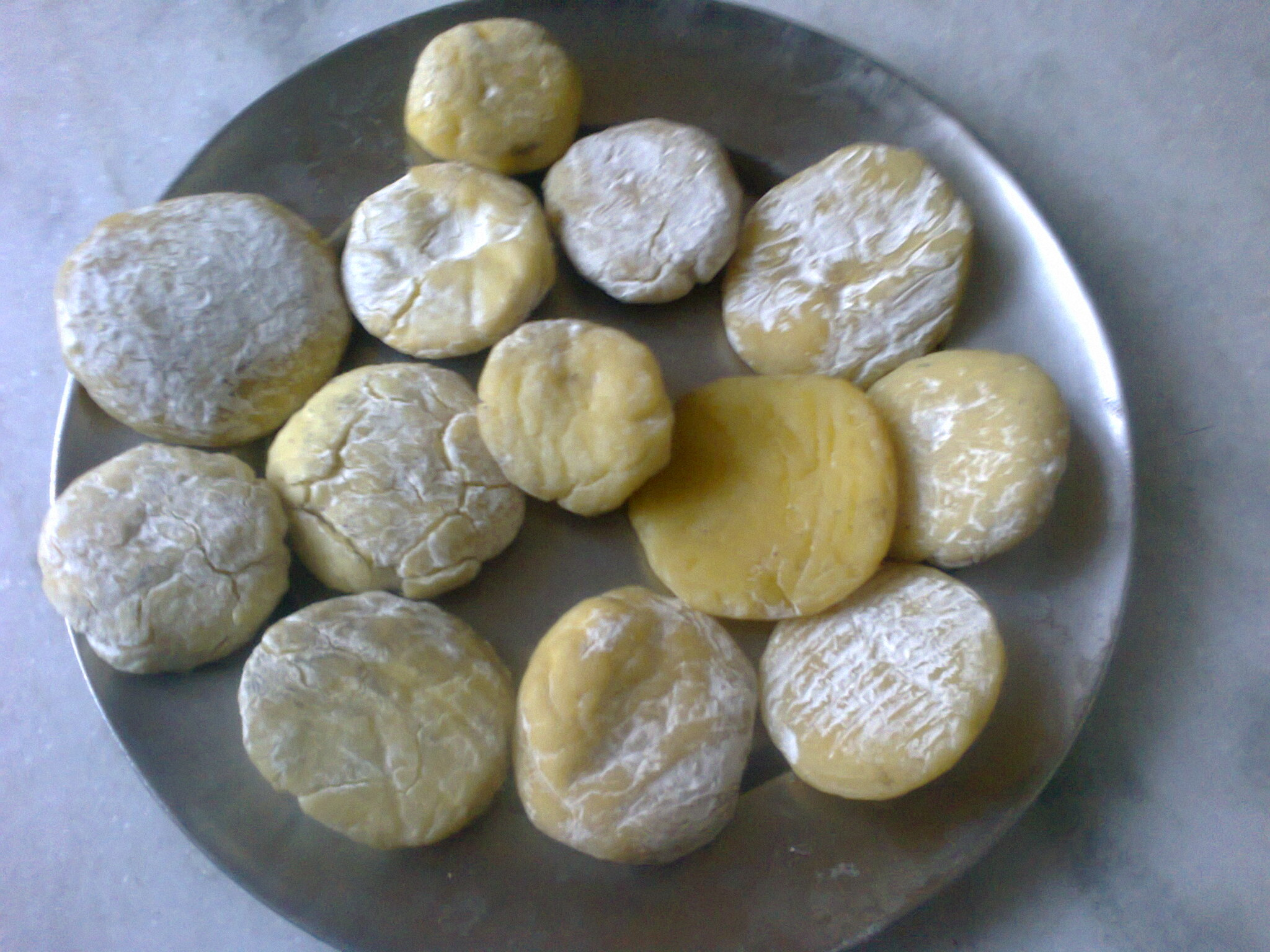
Kalaadi (Kalari) Cheese.

Kalari or Kalaari is a traditional cheese made by the Gurjar community in Kashmir region. It is a staple in Gurjar cuisine, often served as a snack or used in local dishes like "Kalari Kulcha". The cheese is made from cow's or goat's milk and is known for its unique texture and flavor. Kalari cheese is typically made by boiling milk, then curdling it with yogurt or lemon juice. The curds are shaped into balls or parties and cooked in boiling water until they play. The cheese can be served hot or stored in water in the fridge. Kalari's size varies across the Kashmir state. In Udhampur and Reasi, women make smaller Kalari, in Rajouri, Poonch and Kashmir, Gurjars make larger yellowish Kalari, often called "milk roti" due to its large size and different color.

==== Kudan cheese ====
Kudan cheese is a traditional smoked cheese made by the Gurjars of Kashmir. It is often served grilled or pan-fried, known for its unique flavor and popular as a snack. To make it, boil 1 liter milk (cow or goat), mix in 1/2 cup plain yogurt and salt to taste, let it curdle, strain and shape into balls, smoke over wood chips or hay until golden brown, and serve grilled or pan-fried. Gujjars traditionally smoke kudan over open fires, giving it a distinct flavor.

==== Anch ====
Anch is a traditional dish of Gurjar people, made with goat's milk and buffalo yogurt drink (lassi). It is prepared by boiling these ingredients, then cooling and serving them. This traditional dish shows the use of local ingredients by Gurjar and Bakarwal communities.

=== Kinship ===
Gujjars kinship structure is based on three main family groups. The "Dera" (household) is a family unit consisting of parents, children and grandparents. The "Dada-potre" (lineage) refers to relatives connected through a common ancestor, typically covering up to seven generations. The Jat or Gotra (clan) is a larger group linked to their Hindu ancestry.

=== Dera ===
The basis social unit for Gujjar families are the Deras. A Dera is formed when a person gets married and wants to live independently. Within a Dera, people share work responsibilities. Gujjars typically live in Kullas made of special grass, while Bakarwals live in temporary shelters or tents. Some Gujjars own land and cattle, and they have built parmenent homes called Kothas.

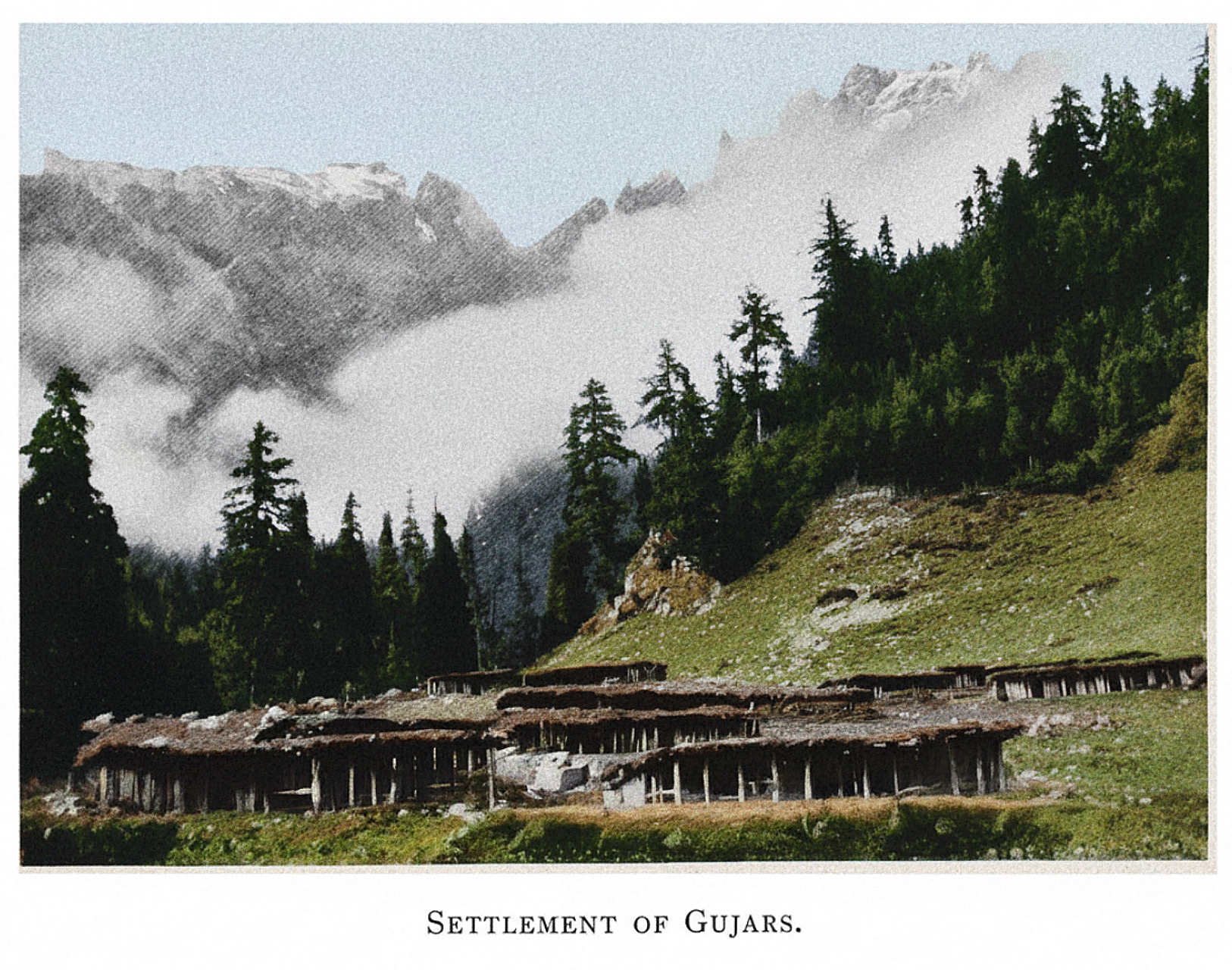
A temporary settlement of tribal Gurjars on mountain areas of Jammu and Kashmir.

=== Festivities ===
Gujjars have fun in different ways. On special days, they invite, singers and flute players to perform. They enjoy Gujjar-Bait (poetry competitions), wrestling, weight lifting, and arm-wrestling. These events exist to watch, with wrestling matches happening to the beat of drums. Herdsmen often play the flute, creating a lovely atmosphere in the fields.

=== Marriage practices ===
Gujjars in the Kashmir region practice endogamy and they strictly marry within their own community. Mostly they practice monogamy, but some rich Gujjars practice polygamy, where a man has multiple wives.

==== Endogamy ====
In Kashmir region, Gurjar community follow the practice of endogamy in which they strictly marry within their own community. They strictly married within their own group, and if someone married outside the community, they were often excluded from the community. Even wealthy families would not typically marry their daughters to no-Gurjars, and vice versa, showing a strong preference for keeping marriages within the tribe.

In Jammu and Kashmir, marriages among the three Gurjar groups — Bakarwals, Gurjars, and Banihara (Dodhi Gujars) — are common. Most Gurjars do not support marriages for their sons or daughters outside Islam. Many Gurjar families hold this view. Most Gurjar families also do not allow their daughters to marry outside the Gurjar community. Kidnaping women for the purpose of marriage is strongly discouraged among Gurjars.

The Bakarwal a subgroup of Muslim Gurjars also strictly marry within their own group (Zat/qom), and it is considered wrong to marry outside their community. In fact, 54% marriages of Bakarwal tribe are within their own zāt (qom), which is a common practice among Muslim Gurjars and some other south Asian Muslim communities, where people tend to marry within their own group.

==== Exogamy ====
Gurjars in Kashmir follow exogamy for marriages. The main role of clans (gotras) is to decide who can marry whom. Mostly Muslim Gurjars, like Hindus, don't marry someone from the same gotra, meaning they marry outside their own gotra.

==== Death rituals ====
Gurjars funeral follow Islamic traditions. When someone dies they are washed (Gousul) by family or someone who knows the ritual. Men and women are washed separately. Then, the body is wrapped in white cloth (Kafan). The community comes together to say a special prayer (Namaz-e-Jinazah) before burial. The person is buried in a graveyard (Qabar), and verses from the holy Quran are read at the grave.

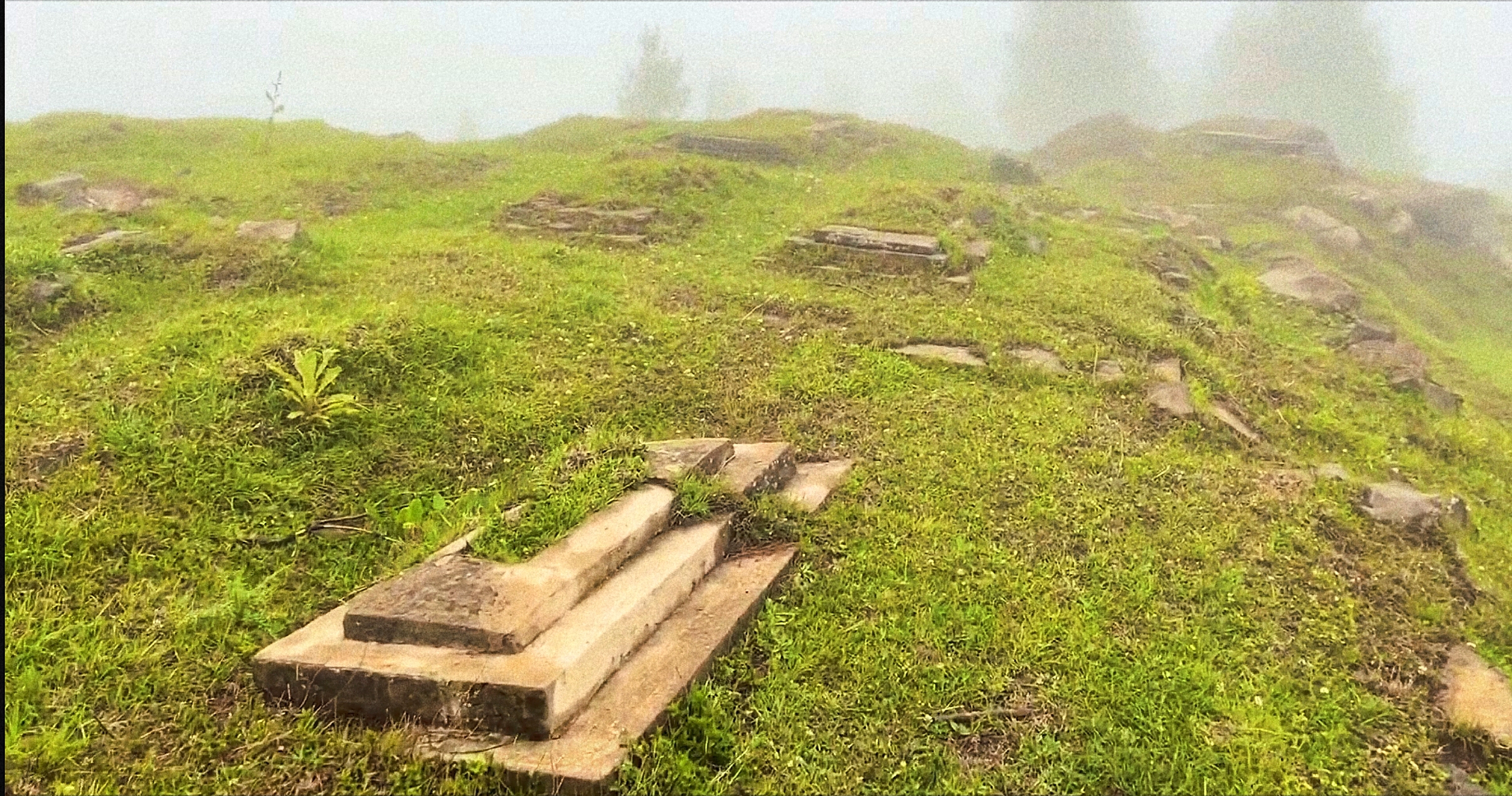
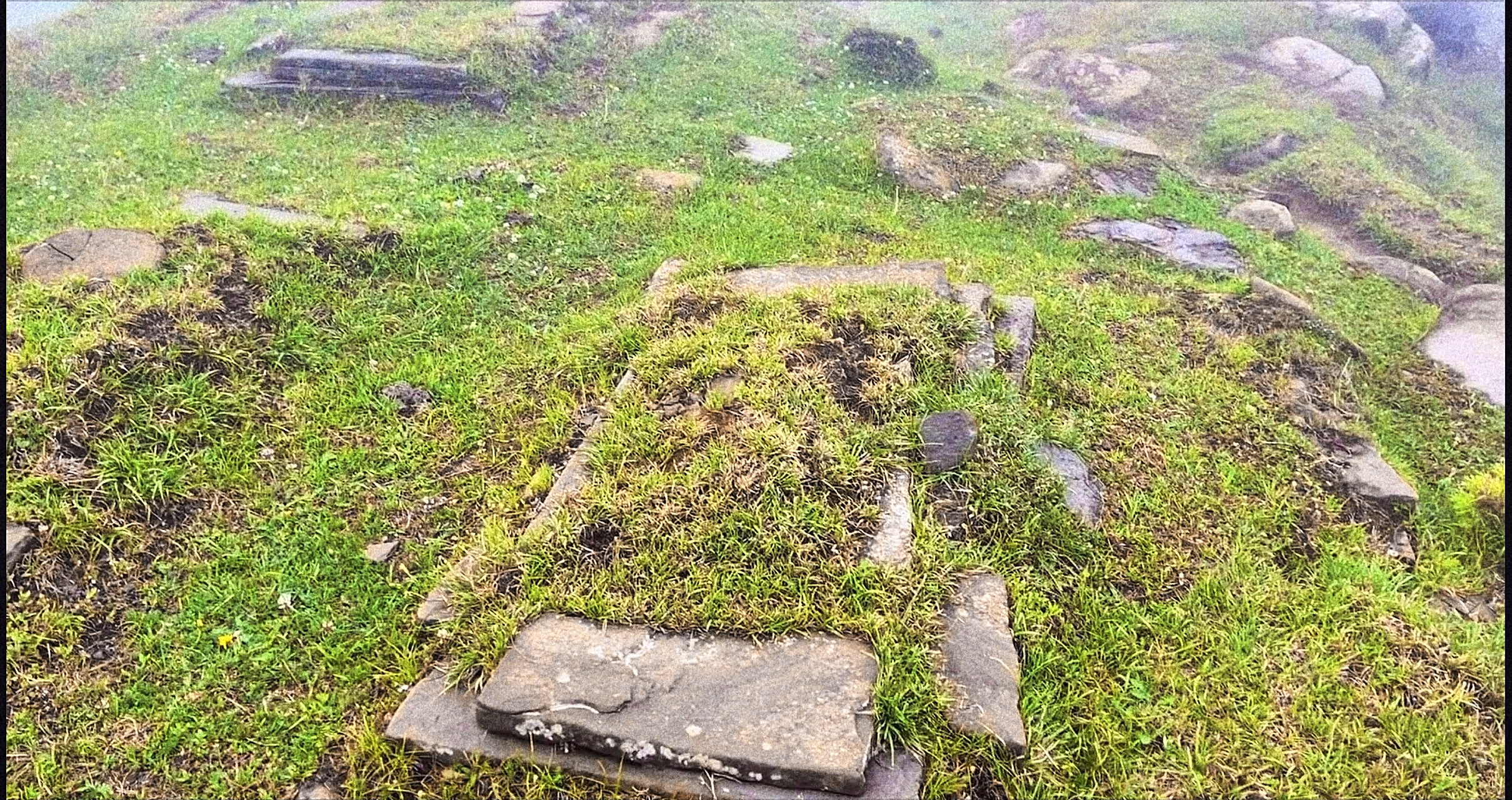
Graveyard (Qabar/Makbara) of Muslim Gurjars on highest mountain area near Muzaffarabad District in Azad Kashmir, Pakistan

When a tribal Gujjar or Bakarwal dies, they are buried near their migration route or winter homes. Family and friends gather to recite Quran verses and honor the deceased with candles on their grave. Neighbors traditionally feed the grieving family for three days and help with small taska. On the fourth day (Chehlum), the family returns to normal life, but they still remember and pray for the deceased on special days like the 14th day and anniversary (Khatam or Niaz). Tribal Gurjars even mourn on the death of a Cow with a '"Siapa" ceremony.

=== Festivals ===
In Kashmir, Gujjars and Bakarwals celebrate various religious and non religious festivals, including Eid-al Adha, Eid-al Fitar, Ramazan, Muharam, Holi, Diwali, and Lohri, with great devotion. They also celebrate Baisakhi and most of their festivals are similar to Gurjars of Punjab.

They also participate in social festivals to honor their ancestors and revered saints. Notable festivals include Mela Bab Nagri, Wangat Lar in Ganderbal, Peer Baba Ghulam Shah in Shadta Shareef, Rajouri, Peer Fateh Shah Sahib, and Gool Budhan in Reasi.

==== Eid celebration ====
In Kashmir, the Gurjar community celebrates Eid festivals with a mix of traditional and modern customs. On Eid morning, they gather at mosques in traditional clothes to pray and greet each other. The air smells amazing with traditional food like 'roht' and khatte maas' cooking. Gurjar women wear beautiful jewelry and henna, while kids have fun on swings and playing games.

The Gurjar community comes together for big feasts, music, and dance, which brings them closer and keeps their heritage alive. Older folks share stories about their ancestors, passing on traditions to the next generation. At night, fireworks and 'Daf' performances spreading joy and togetherness. For Gurjars, Eid is about celebrating their faith, culture, and community, reconnecting with their roots and loved ones, and making happy memories. Eid celebrations reflects the traditional cultural heritage of "Kashmiri Gujjars".

=== Sports and games ===
Games and support are an important part of Gujjar and Bakarwal culture in Jammu and Kashmir. Despite their challenging life, they find time for recreation. Their traditional sports include hunting, wrestling, archery, and cock/bull fighting, with hunting still popular among elders. Music on the banjli and algoja flutes has been a favorite pastime for centuries. Other traditional activities include stone lifting (bugdar), arm wrestling (beeni panjo), Chitto played by girls, and panj great ,an indoor game with five stones. Children commonly play chupan-chupai (hide-and-seek), Gili Danda hopscotch and Gulial (sling and stone). Storytelling by grandparents and elders is also a traditional form of entertainment.

=== Sufism ===
Like other Sunni Muslims, the Gurjars and Bakarwals generally follow Sufi religious practices that focus on saints and holy figures. Their adoption of Islam was largely influenced by the peaceful role of Sufi saints. In Sufi tradition, both living and deceased saints are believed to possess greater spiritual power than ordinary people. Devotees seek to gain this spiritual power through physical contact, such as touching the saint's body or relics, or by consuming his leftover food and water.

==== Shrine visit ====
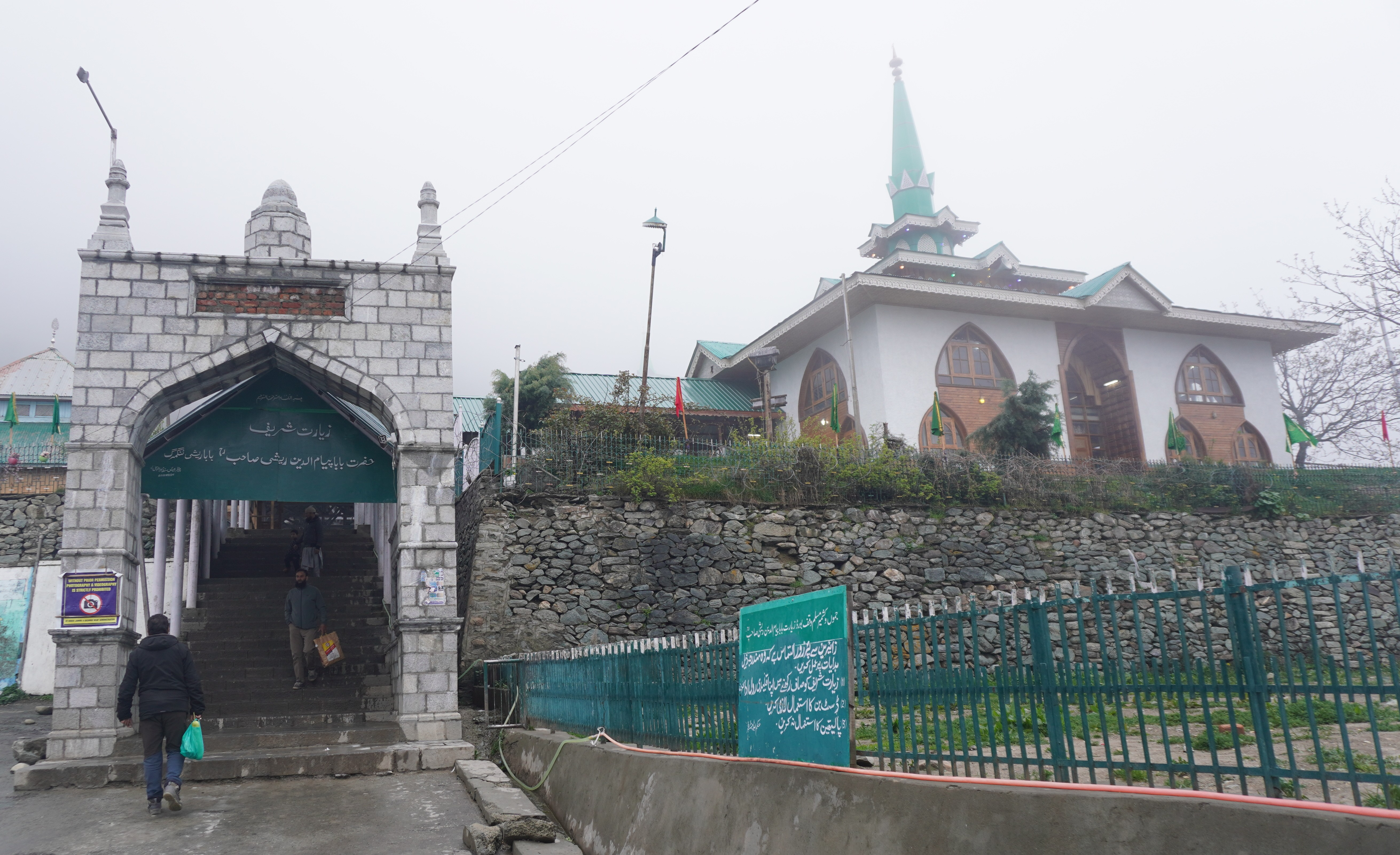
A shrine of Baba Reshi in Baramullah district.

Ziyarat is another common practice in sufism. Zayarat means visiting the shrine of a deceased Sufi saint who is still believed to be spiritually present. These shrines are locally called Mazar, Ziyarat, Astaan, Khankah, Makbra or Rouzah. The Gurjars and Bakarwals frequently visit these places because they are considered the homes of spiritual sufi saints. Gurjars visit shrines every Thursday evening. Wangat Sharif or Baba Nagri in Kangan, Baramullah district, is a major shrine dedicated to 19th-century Sufi saint Hazrat Muhammad Ubaid Ullah, Known as Baba Larvi. Who belonged to Gurjar community. He is revered by Gurjars, Bakarwals and other communities, and an annual Urs is held there in July. Some other shrines highly revered by Gurjars and Bakarwals in Jammu and Kashmir include Hazrat Baba Ghulam Shah Badshah in Rajouri, Hazrat Pir Joth Ali Shah, Hazrat Naga Baji Sahib in Bandipora, Hazrat Baba Khari in Rajouri, Sheikh Ahmad Karim at Pir Ki Gali in Shopian, Hazrat Noor-ud-din Wali in Charar-i-Sharief, Budgam, Hazrat Yarmi Wala Pir in Khanyar, Srinagar and Kishtwar, Hazrat-e-Zinda Baba Sahib in Nariyan, Rajouri, Hazrat Baba Sharif Sahib in Tral, Pulwama, Hazrat Zain-ud-din Wali in Aishmuqam, Pahalgam, Anantnag, Hazrat Chotte Shah Sahib in Poonch, and Hazrat Sain Illahi Baksh Sahib in Rajouri.

=== Jirga (Panchayat) ===
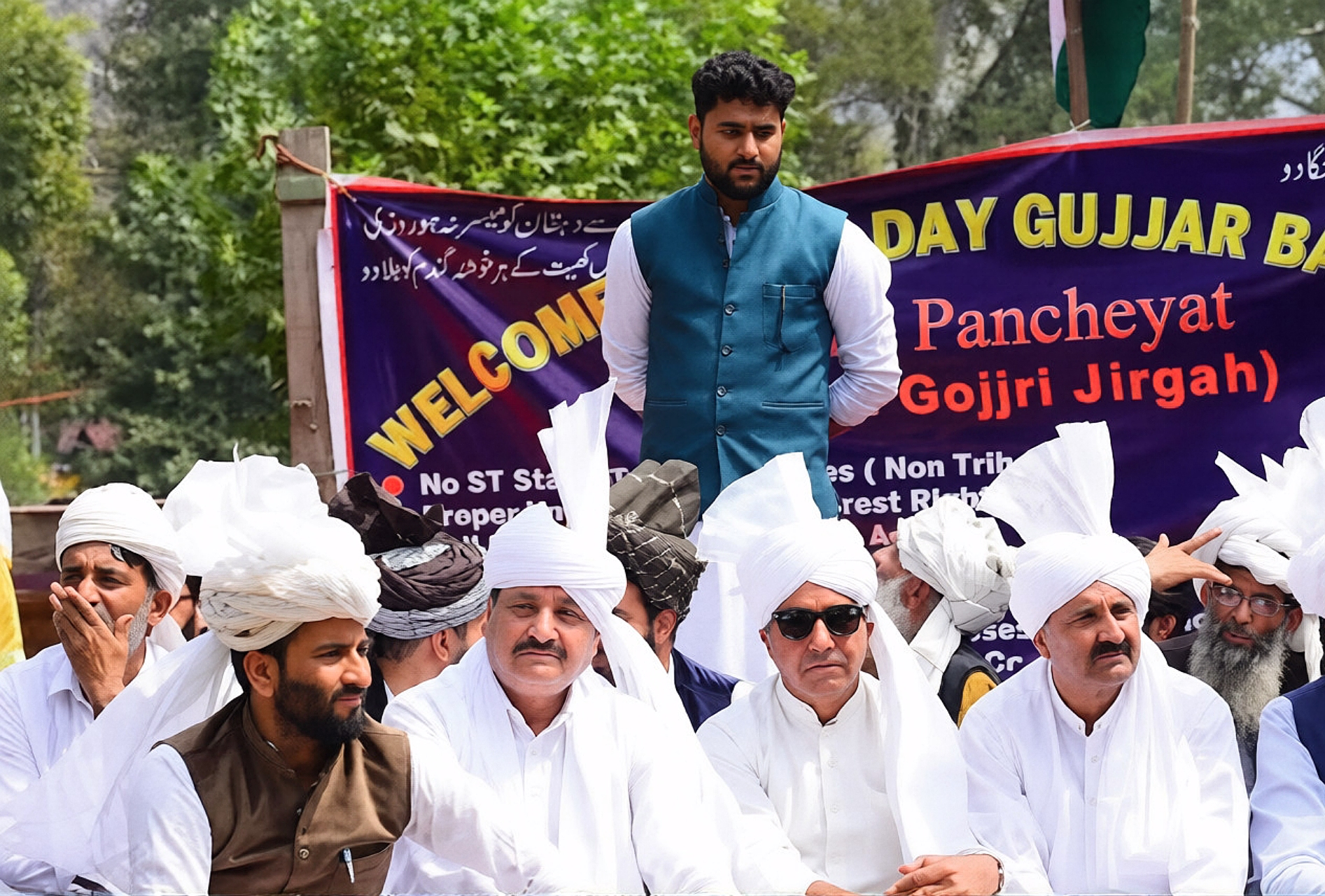
A group of Gujjar men in a traditional Jigra from Jammu and Kashmir

Gurjars tribals of Jammu and Kashmir follow the Jirga system to resolve everyday issues, including land disputes, political, social, educational, and community-related matters. In Jammu and Kashmir Gujjars and Bakarwals, traditionally had their own councils called Jirga to settle disputes. Many still use this traditional system, but some prefer to go to the police or courts instead. In recent years, a new system of local government called Panchayat Raj is being used in some areas of Jammu and Kashmir.

Still some Kashmiri Gurjars and Bakarwals follows a traditional Jirga system, a type of Panchayat used to resolve disputes. There is not a single Jirga among Gurjars of Kashmir. Each kafila, a large herding group, has its own Jirga led by a Mukaddam, has its own Jirga that handles conflicts within families and among community members, and qabilas (tribes).

== Population ==
In Jammu and Kashmir the population of Gujari-speaking Gurjars and Bakarwals in the 2011 census of India was recorded at 11,70,054.

According to official statistics, Jammu and Kashmir has more than 1.5 million (15 lakh) Gujjars and Bakarwals. This number includes around 500,000 Bakarwal people who moved around with their livestock for a living.

In Azad Kashmir population of the Gurjars is estimated at 8,00,000.

In 1931 census of British India the population of the Gurjars for president-day Pakistani-administered Gilgit-Baltistan was recorded at 3,098 individuals.

In Ladakh the population of Gujari-speaking Gurjars and Bakarwals in the 2011 census of India was recorded at 154.

=== Historical population ===
Population of Gurjars recorded in different census reports of the British India for Kashmir region (later Jammu and Kashmir state) now which has been the subject of a dispute between India, Pakistan and China.

Historical population
Year	Pop.	±% p.a.
1891	245,796	—
1901	286,109	+1.53%
1911	328,003	+1.38%
1921	362,107	+0.99%
1931	402,781	+1.07%
1941	381,457	−0.54%
source: 1891 census - 1901 census - 1911 census - 1921 census - 1931 census - 1941 census

== Social status ==
The social status of the Gurjars in Azad Kashmir and Gilgit-Baltistan is generally equal to other tribes of the regions. Initially in 1989, the schedule tribe status was given to some tribal communities in Jammu and Kashmir (state), including Bakarwal and Sippi, as well as the Tribal communities of Ladakh. Later, in April 1991, Gurjars of Jammua and Kashmir and Ladakh were classified as a Schedule Tribe under the Indian Government's general reservation scheme of positive discrimination.

Gurjars and Bakarwals now make up about 10% of the total 20% reservation quota system in Jammu and Kashmir (union territory) of India.

== Economy ==
The economy of Jammu and Kashmir mainly relies on animal husbandry. It is one of the key industries that has helped the states' finances a lot. The Gujjars and Bakarwals are a community that traditionally moves from place to place in Jammu and Kashmir. Their main sources of income come from agriculture and raising livestock, including buffaloes, horse, donkey, sheep, goats, and cow.

In Jammu and Kashmir Gurjar and Bakarwal communities practice traditional saffron farming. They use ridge and furrow methods that protest the soil and help retain more organic carbon. This type of farming also increase soil microbial diversity by about 40% compared to chemical-intensive methods.

== Literacy rate and Education ==
The literacy rate of Gujjars in 2001 census of India was 31.7% in Jammu and Kashmir.

In 2011 census of India 34.4% of Gujjars were literate in Jammu and Kashmir, up 2.7% from 10 years earlier. To boost education, the government has set up schools, including mobile schools for Gujjar children who moved around with their livestock. The government is also offering scholarships to help increase literacy rates among Gujjars. The Tribal Welfare Department runs programs to support education, including scholarships for students after Matriculation.

In Azad Kashmir most Gurjars have received formal education. Educational attainment among Gurjars in this region appears to be higher than in areas to the west, with increasing numbers pursuing and completing higher education. The region is reported to have a large number of schools. Among settled Gurjars communities, school attendance is common for both boys and girls.

== Traditional veterinary practices ==
=== Jammu and Kashmir ===
In India, people have been using traditional animal medicine for a long time. Ancient texts like Atharvaveda contain remedies for animal diseases. Local Indian communities know how to use these traditional treatments, which helps their economy and daily life. The Gujjar and Bakarwal communities rely heavily on local plants for their needs as they live in remote areas with limited modern amenities. The Poonch district where Gujjar is a major ethnic group is home to rich and endangered species. The area's vegetation includes coniferous forests (with trees like pine and cedar), broad-leaved evergreen forests, deciduous forests, and scrub forests, featuring trees like oak, maple, and poplar.

A 2021 study found that Gujjar and Bakarwal communities in Jammu and Kashmir mainly use herbs (about 71%) for traditional animal healthcare, followed by trees and shrubs (about 13% each), and climbers (about 3%). This means herbs are their go-to for Ethnoveterinary medicine. This finding matches earlier studies in Jammu and Kashmir and India. Interestingly, studies in lower areas found trees are used more often for animal healthcare.

A 2023 study found that Gurjars and Bakarwals use plants for medicinal purposes. The plants used were mostly herbs (80%), followed by trees (8%), ferns (6%), shrubs (4%), and fungi (2%). Herbs were likely used because they have a lot of bio-active compounds and work better than other plant parts. The plants came from 34 families, with Asteraceae (11 species), Lamiaceae (5 species), and Boraginaceae and Caryophyllaceae (4 species).

Other notable families included Ranunculaceae (3 species), and several families with 2 species each, with 21 families had only 1 species each. Only a few plants (14 species, 22%) were used similarly by Gurjar, Bakarwal and Kashmir people. The Gurjar and Bakarwal groups had the most similar uses (23 species, 36%), followed by Gurjars and Kashmiris (14 species, 22%). Gurjars -Bakarwals used the most plants for medicinal purposes, likely due to their reliance on forest products and livestock. Kashmiris used fewer plants.

=== Azad Kashmir ===
A 2024 study based on seven ethnic groups in the Muzaffarabad Division of Azad Kashmir found that Gurjars and Bakarwals use most plants for medicinal purposes compared to other communities in the region. Gurjar communities use lots of wild plants that other groups do not. They eat a lot of plants as medicine and have traditional knowledge about wild plants which they pass down. Unlike other groups of Azad Kashmir they do not rely on store-bought plants -they harvest their own plants and vegetables. The Bakarwal community was the second biggest users of wild food plants. They spend most of their time herding in high mountain areas, so they have learned a lot about the plants that grow there. They often eat these plants and have their own special ways of using them.

A 2025 study found 63 types of wild plant species use by 5 ethnic groups in Azad Kashmir, Pakistan. A total of 63 types includes 11 fungi and 52 plants. Gurjars used most - 59 types, while Bakarwals used 20. Three new wild food ingredients were discovered: Fagopyrum cymosum, and Armillaria mellea (used by Gurjars) and Lagotis cashmeriana (used by Bakarwals). Gurjar women knew more about these plants that men, since they often pick, eat, and cook them. Young people knew less - they knew about 19 plants, mainly from Gurjar and Bakarwal groups.

== Politics ==
=== Azad Kashmir ===
Gurjars are a politically influential ethnic group in Azad Kashmir, they have been winning most elections since 1947, and they make up a big chunk of the MLAs (Members of the Legislative Assembly) there. In the 2006 Azad Kashmiri general election for the 8th Legislative Assembly of Azad Kashmir, 41 candidates for 41 constituency seats contested the election. Many Gurjar candidates also contested from various constituencies across AJK. As a result of the election, a total of seven Gurjar candidates were successful and won their seats.

Gujjars also known as Chaudhary in Azad Kashmir had a strong presence in the previous AJK assembly (9th Assembly of the Azad Kashmir from 2011 - 2016), with over a dozen lawmakers were elected from the Gurjar community. Political analyst Sajjad Mis says Gujjar politicians know their community's influence and switch parties to be on the winning side. He cites Chaudhary Shehzad Gujjar, who left PML-N from PTI expecting his community's support. Another analyst, Gulzar Usmani, notes that with candidate s from the same b community competing, their votes will likely split. In various areas, including Muzaffarabad and Mirpur, this dynamic is playing out. In the 2021 Azad Kashmir general election for the 10th Legislative Assembly of Azad Kashmir many Gujjar politicians were elected from different areas of AJK.

=== Jammu and Kashmir ===
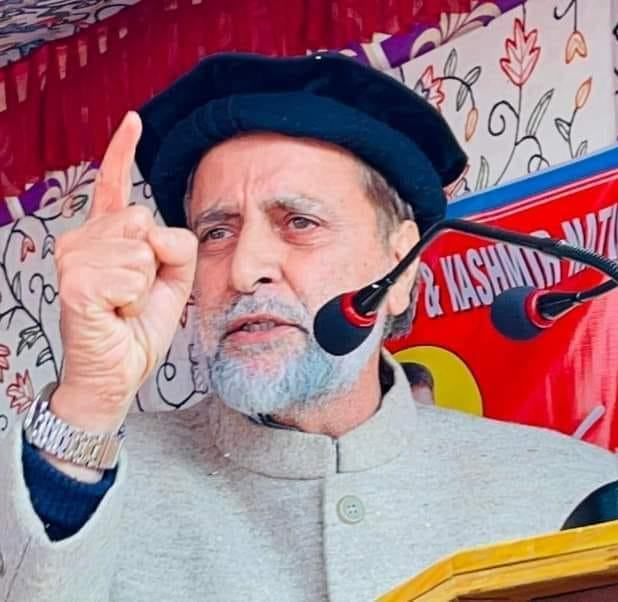
Mian Altaf Larvi, a Gujjar politician

In 1932, the Muslim conference party was formed by Sheikh Mohammad Abdullah. Many Gurjars joined the Muslim conference and became active in the regional politics of Jammu and Kashmir. Some prominent Gurjar leaders who joined the party first include, Maulvi Muhammad Abdullah Sheikhvi and Maulvi Abdul Karim from the areas of Jammu and Mirpur. In 1939, the Muslim Conference became the National Conference and adopted secular and socialist idead. Only a few Gurjars and Bakarwals joined it. Many people thought Sheikh Abdullah was too socialist and radical. Because of this, a regional Congress party was formed in Jammu. One of the first Gurjar wo join this Congress was Pir Mia Nizam-ud-Din. At that time, he was one of the richest and most powerful Gurjar in Jammu and Kashmir. He joined the Congress instead of the Muslim Conference. He may have done this because he had less formal education, was a spiritual leader in a particular group, and as a Gujjar with local authority, he did not feel comfortable in a movement mainly led by Kashmiris. In 1944, Mia Nizam-ud-Din was elected to the Praja Sabha during partial elections. Around the same time, a new Anjuman-e Mushaekh party was formed. Most of its members were local spiritual leaders. Main Nizam-ud-Din became the president of its Jammu and Kashmir chapter.

Gurjars are an influential community in the electoral politics of Jammu and Kashmir. In Jammu and Kashmir, for many decades the Jammu & Kashmir National Conference party has been competing with the Indian national Congress party to attract Gurjar voters. Gurjars have traditionally been supporters of the Indian national Congress in Gurjars-dominated areas of J & K, especially in the Rajouri and Poonch districts of Jammu division. They are considered an important voting block in 16 to 27 assembly constituencies across the Union Territory. In the 2014 Jammu and Kashmir Legislative Assembly election for the 12th Jammu and Kashmir Assembly they have won in 9 seats in areas including: Haveli, Surankote, Mendhar, Kangan, and Uri. They also has a notable presence in 13 other constituencies, including Kalakote, Kupwara, Karnah, Reasi, Nagrit, Inderwal, Noorabad, Uri, Shopian, Kokenag, Shang, Tangmarg, Pahalgam, and Langate. In Jammu and Kashmir, Gurjars constitute a big portion of the electorate in state and national elections, and their votes are influential in many areas.

The Gurjars have issues with other Muslims, especially Kashmiri Muslims. They say Kashmiris use fake Scheduled tribe certificates to get their kinds into top schools and government jobs. They also feel Kashmiris have dominated top government positions for 40+ years, ignoring Gujjar needs. Gujjars believe Kashmiri leaders prioritize their own region. These complaints seem real, given the clear neglect of Gujjars. Gujjars have very little representation in the State legislative assembly, with only 5.26% of seats in Jammu & Kashmir.

As per 1998 findings, in Jammu division, they fare a bit better, typically electing 4-5 representatives. However, the valley has not elected a Gujjar in a long time, even in areas where they make up a big part of the voters, like Noorabad and Bandipore. These areas seem to be set up so the majority community (Sunnis) always wins. The same lack of representation applies to national level position s in Lok Sabha and Rajya Sabha. It is a fact that Gujjars are underrepresented in government jobs in Jammu & Kashmir, India. Out of 3,000 state Secretariat employees, only 2 are Gujjars, there are just 5 Gujjar police officers in top positions, and no Gujjar deputy commissioners. They also lack representation in key commissions and boards. Out of 2,50,000 government employees, only 5,000 are Gujjars - that is 2%.

The Congress government in Delhi, led by Indira Gandhi, recognizes the Gurjars' electoral importance in Jammu and Kashmir (state) and wooed them, earning their lasting loyalty. This move did not sit well with National Conference party of Sheikh Abdullah. However, Sheikh Abdullah did some work on initiative for Gujjar welfare aided by prominent Gurjar leader Mian Bashir Ahmed Larvi of National Conference. In 1975, the government created a Gujjar and Bakarwals Welfare Board, funding various schemes. Some initiatives including communities, allocating shops, providing free uniforms and books, and setting up mobile schools and hospitals for migratory Gurjars.

In the 2002 Jammu and Kashmir Legislative Assembly election, there were 87 seats. Only 4 members (4.60%) were elected from the Gujjar community, while 83 (95.40%) were elected or nominated from the general category. Gujjar community has just 4.60% representation in the state assembly, despite making up 7.58% of the population according to 2001 census. In the 2008 Jammu and Kashmir Legislative Assembly election, the situations did not improve much, only five members (5.7%) from the Gurjar community won their seats in the assembly.

In the 2014 Jammu and Kashmir Legislative Assembly election, the Gurjar community's representation grew from four seats to nine. This meant their representation in the assembly increased from 4.60% in 2001 to 10.34% in 2014. The arrival of national Political parties of India in the region has given Gurjar politicians a chance to represent their community's interests. In Jammu and Kashmir, Gujjars make up a significant voting population in 21 assembly constituencies. In the 2014 Jammu and Kashmir Legislative Assembly election, nine Gurjars were elected as MLAs this was a notable achievement, especially in Poonch and Rajouri districts where five out of seven elected MLAs were Gujjars.

In 2020 in the first District Development Council (DDC) election in Jammu and Kashmir total 38. The 26 members won from Jammu division, and the 15 were tribal Gurjar women from the Bakarwal Gujjar community.

In the 2024 Jammu and Kashmir Legislative Assembly election, the Jammu & Kashmir National Conference party secured the victory. Following this win, Omar Abdullah took office as the chief minister of Jammu and Kashmir. He picked a team of 6 ministers, which includes Surinder Kumar Choudhary, Sakeena Masood, Javed Ahmed Rana, Javid Ahmad Dar, and Satish Sharma. Out of six ministers Javed Ahmed Rana is a Gurjar leader who comes from Pir Panjal region. His electoral victory was in Mendhar Assembly constituency of Poonch district, India.

== Occupation ==
=== Jammu and Kashmir ===
In Jammu and Kashmir the occupation of the Gurjars and Bakarwals fall into several categories: Domestic worker, Pastoral, Agriculture, Government jobs, and other various occupations. The main occupations of Kashmiri Gurjars are agriculture, raising livestock, and skilled trades such as blacksmithing, carpentry, cobbling, and weaving. Some Gurjars also sell dairy products and work as porters or pony riders.

As per the 2008 National classification Occupation report, the main occupation of Gujjars in Jammu and Kashmir has clearly changed; now they don't work as shepherds (nomad) anymore. Most Gujjars in J&K now work for daily wages, either in the family or other jobs. Their work depends on the time of year- they find jobs in villages during harvest seasons, and move to towns when there is no farm work to look for other jobs. It turns out shepherding is not their main occupation for anyone.

A 2024 Field Survey of the Jammu and Kashmir Government found that the main occupation of Gujjars in Jammu and Kashmir was: 35.7% agricultural and Labourer, 25.3% farmers, 17.3% pastoral (herdsmen), 3.3% in government jobs, 16% unemployed, 1.1% students, and 1.3% engaged in other occupations.

About 25% of Gujjars said farming is their main occupation, growing crops mostly for themselves. The Gujjars in Jammu and Kashmir do not really do commercial farming. They have small plots of land, about 0.125 hectares on average, which they use for their homes, growing corn, or kitchen gardens. About 16% of people said they are homemaker, so they are not considered employed. Most of these, around 60%, are men. Many of these men used to work as shepherds or laborers but cannot do physical work anymore, so they help out at home. The survey further revealed that only 17% Gujjar said shepherding (or pastoral work) is their main occupation. Some said shepherding just wasn't profitable, so they stopped.

=== Azad Kashmir ===
In Azad Kashmir, Gurjars are found at various levels of society, ranging from domestic workers to government officials. Many Gurjars own agricultural land in the region.

== Gallery ==
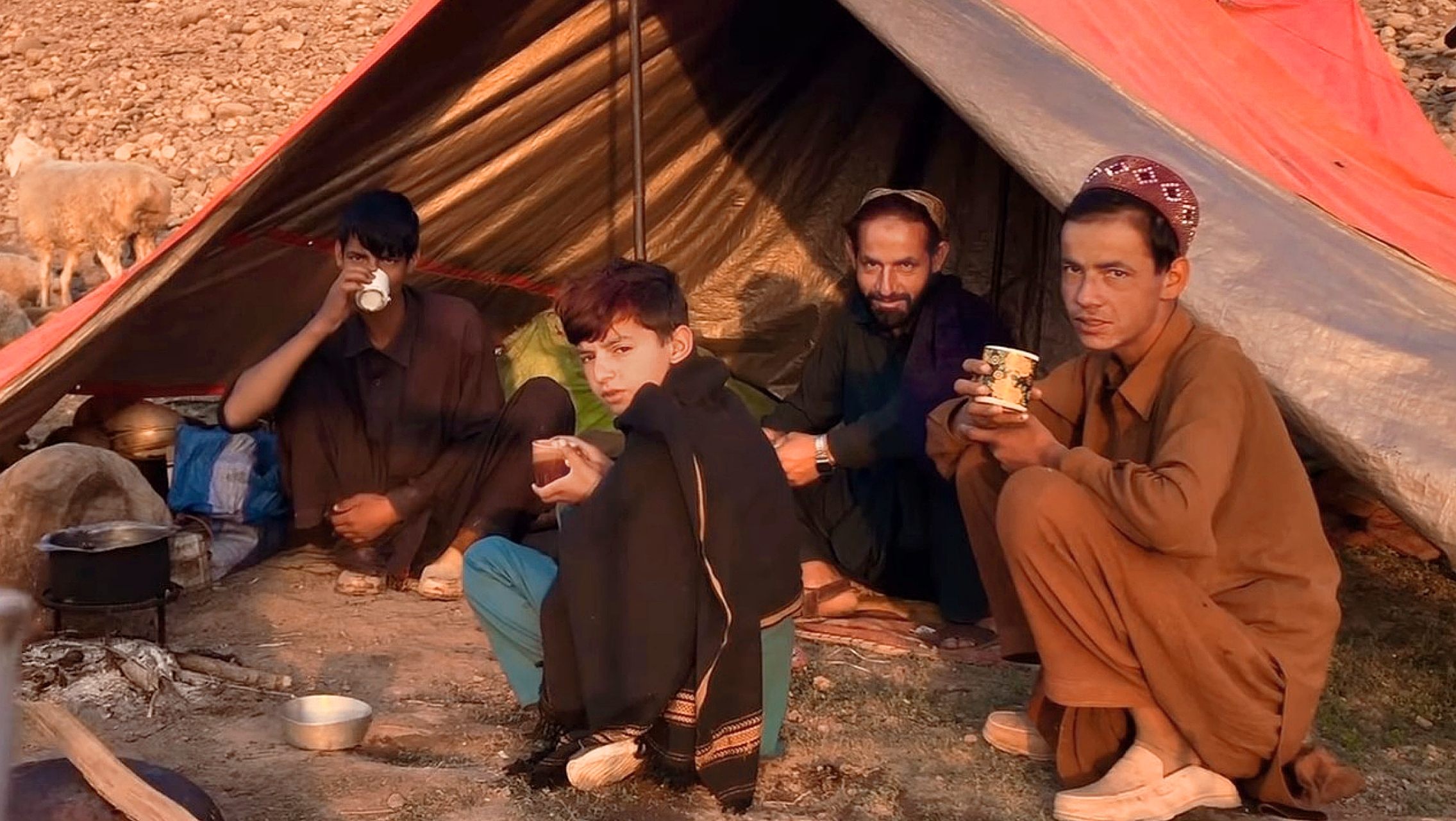
A Muslim Gurjar father with his three sons from Azad Kashmir, Pakistan

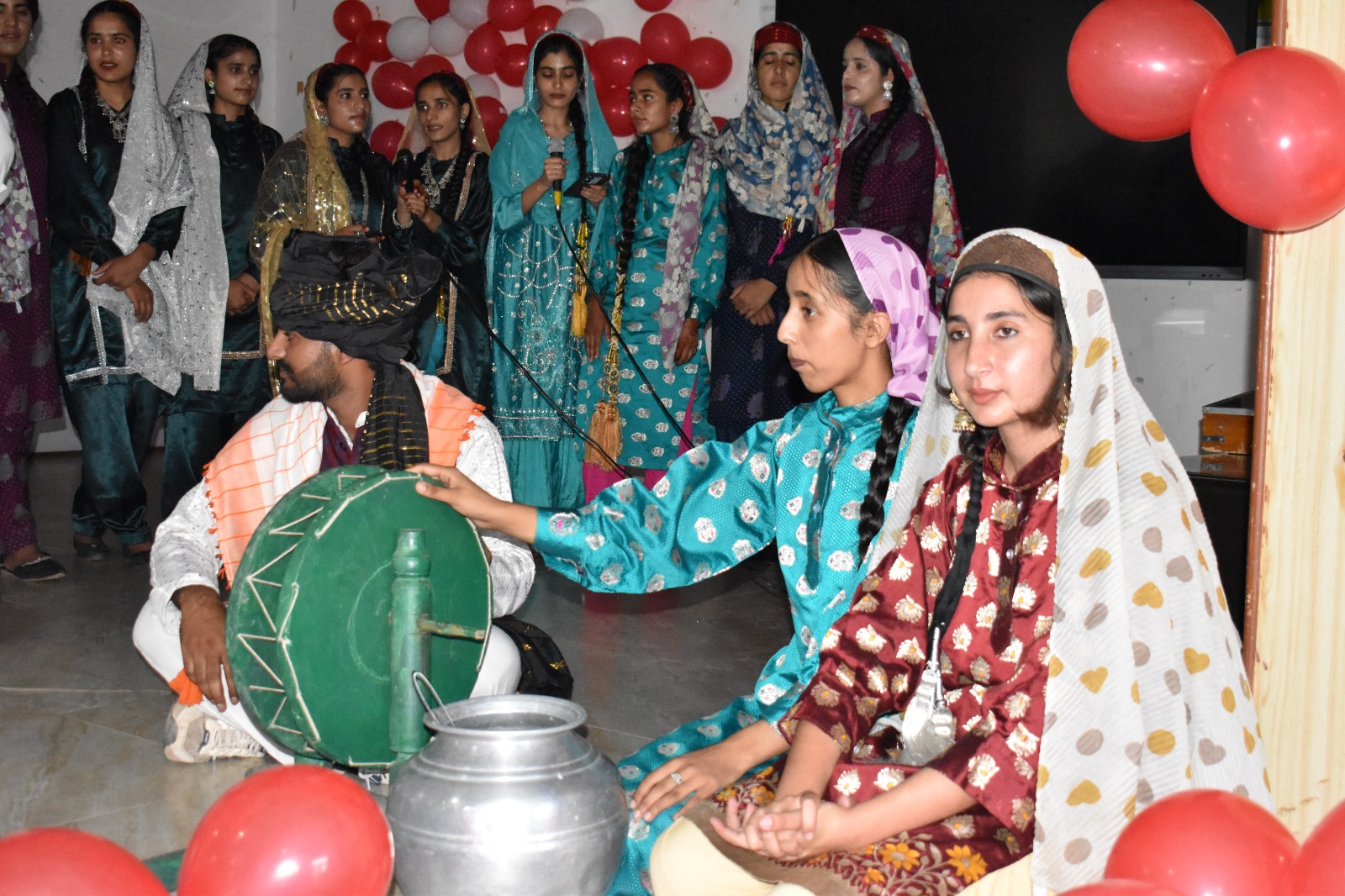
A group of Gurjar girls in a cultural festival from Poonch, Jammu and Kashmir, India

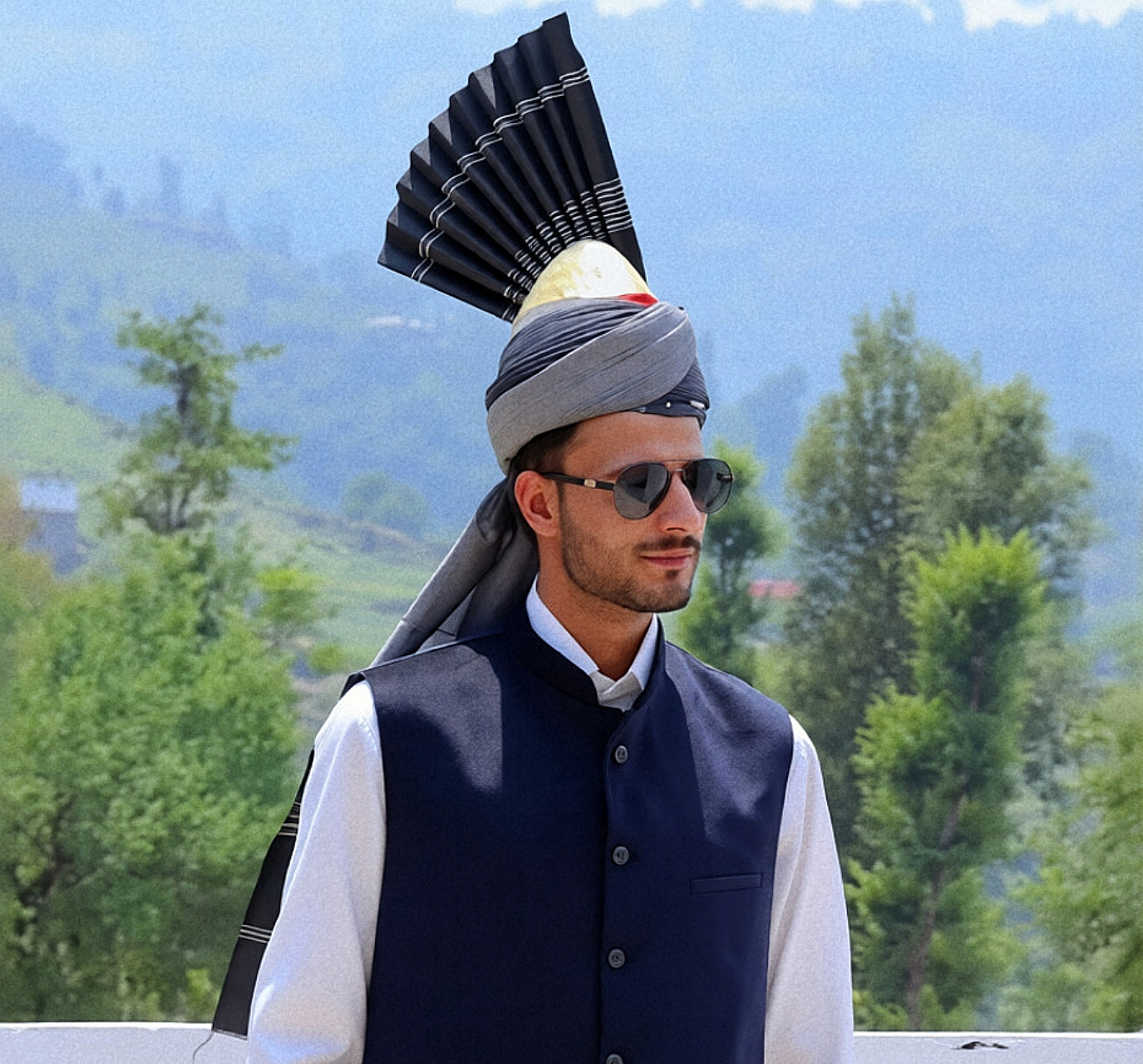
Tribal Gurjar man wearing traditional clothes with Gujar style turban from Poonch, India

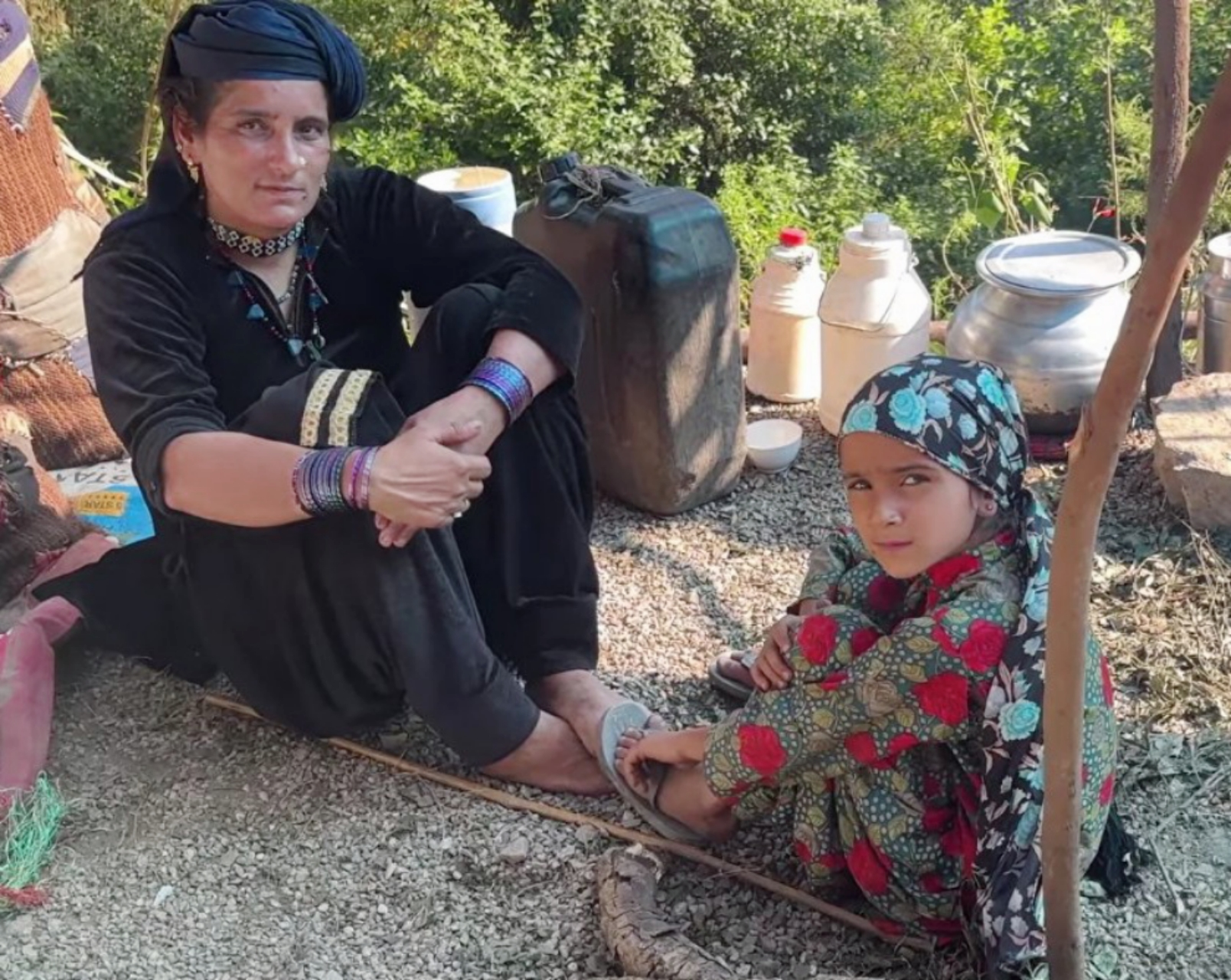
A tribal Muslim Gurjar woman from Jammu and Kashmir with her daughter

== Notable ==
- Faizul Waheed, Islamic scholar
- Aslam Chowdhary Mohammad, politicians from Surankote
- Mian Bashir Ahmed, Sufi saint and politicians Ganderbal
- Abdul Ghani Azhari, Muslim scholar from Poonch, India
- Masud Choudhary, educator and social reformer
- Shahid Iqbal Choudhary, IAS officer from Rajouri
- Chowdhary Mohmmad Hussain, Politicians from Rajouri
- Javaid Rahi, writer from Poonch, India
- Sahibzada Muhammad Ishaq Zaffar, Politicians from Azad Kashmir
- Ghulam Ali Khatana, politicians
- Mian Altaf Ahmed Larvi, politicians from Ganderbal
- Chaudhary Ghulam Hussain, social reformer
- Mohammad Aslam Kohli, Politicians
- Haji Buland Khan, politicians from Ramban
- Ajaz Ahmad Khan, politicians from Reasi
- Javed Ahmed Rana, politicians from Mendhar, Poonch, India

== See also ==
- Gujari
- Gurjars in Punjab
- Gurjars in Khyber Pakhtunkhwa
- Gurjars in Himachal Pradesh
- Gurjars in Uttarakhand
- Gurjars in Maharashtra
- Tribal Research and Cultural Foundation
- Bakarwal people

== Bibliography ==
- Suri, Kavita; Hooda, Deepshikha (2014). Gujjars and Bakkarwals of Jammu & Kashmir: In the Shadows of Conflict. Shubhi Publications. ISBN 978-81-8290-323-4.
- Javaid, Rahi (January 2011). The Gujjars Tribe of Jammu & Kashmir. Gulshan Book. ISBN 9788183391030.
- Ahmed, Jameel; Ahmed, Israr (2019). Scheduled Tribes of Jammu and Kashmir: Issues and Challenges (1 ed.). India: Studium Press. ISBN 9789385046582.
- Sharma, Dinesh (1988). Education and Socialization Among the Tribes: With Special Reference to Gujjars of Kashmir. Commonwealth Publishers. ISBN 978-81-900066-6-8.
- Khajuria, R. R.; A.N, Bharadhwaj (June 1981). جموں و کشمیر کے گجر [Gurjars of Jammu and Kashmir] (in Urdu). Jammu and Kashmir: Gulshan Book (گلشن بک). p. 194.
- Gupta, Tanu; Chaudhary, Barnali; Jain, Riya; Ojha, Amitash (1 May 2025). "From words to worlds: language, identity, and transgenerational change in Gujjars and Bakerwals, the transhumant pastoral tribe of Jammu and Kashmir". Journal of Cultural Cognitive Science. 9 (1): 105–119. doi:10.1007/s41809-024-00161-7. ISSN 2520-1018.
