= Muslim Gurjars =

Ethno-religious group in South Asia

Total population
- ~36.86 million (see below)

Regions with significant populations
- • Pakistan • India • Afghanistan • Nepal

Languages
- • Gujari • Punjabi • Pashto • Hindko • Kashmiri • Pahari • Dogri • Balochi • Sindhi • Shina • Balti • Seraiki • Urdu • Hindi • Dari (Persian)

Religion
- Sunni Islam

Related ethnic groups
- • Kashmiri Muslims • Gurjar

Muslim Gurjars (Note: Muslim Gurjars, Muslim Gujjars, Musalmān Gujjars, or Muslim Gujars (Gujari/Urdu/Punjabi: مُسَلمَان گُجَّر, Pashto: مسلمان ګوجر, Persian: مسلم گوجار, Hindi: मुस्लिम गुर्जर, Gurmukhi Punjabi: ਂਉਸ੍ਲ੍ਇਮ੍ ਙ੍ਉਰ੍ਜ੍ਅਰ੍ਸ੍, Pahari: M𑚄𑚨𑚶𑚥𑚮𑚢𑚶 G𑚄𑚤𑚶𑚑𑚤𑚶𑚨𑚶)) also spelled Gujjar, Gujar, or Gojar, are an ethno-religious group of the larger Gurjar ethnic community, who follow Islam and are native to the north-western regions of South Asia. They are primarily found in Pakistan, Afghanistan, and also in various regions of northern India. They embraced Islam from the medieval period onwards, and are divided into several sub-groups and clans. In Pakistan, they traditionally belong to the agricultural class of the country (Note: Gurjars in Pakistan are a traditionally agricultural community.) and are a politically influential community.

Muslim Gujars are a large ethnic group in Pakistan, particularly in Punjab and Azad Kashmir, and the third-largest ethnic group in Khyber Pakhtunkhwa and Jammu and Kashmir. (Note: Muslim Gujjars are a large ethnic group in Pakistan, mainly in Punjab and Azad Kashmir. They are also the third-largest ethnic group in Khyber Pakhtunkhwa & Jammu and Kashmir.) They are also found as a minority group in Afghanistan, Nepal and other parts of north India.

In the Himalayan states of Jammu and Kashmir, Himachal Pradesh and Uttarakhand, most of them are nomads with some settled communities. In Indian Punjab, Haryana, Delhi and Uttar Pradesh they traditionally belong to the agricultural class. Based on their occupation nomad Muslim Gujars in Jammu and Kashmir, Uttarakhand and HP are divided into subgroups like Van Gujar, Bakarwal, Banjara, and Dodhi Gujars.

In northern India, Muslim Gujars live in a geographical and biosocial isolation from Hindu Gurjars, with whom they have not maintained relationships, and marriages between the two groups are restricted. In contrast, intermarriages are common among Muslim Gujars of Himachal Pradesh and Muslim Van Gujars of Uttar Pradesh, Himachal Pradesh and Uttarakhand. (Note: Muslim Gujars in Himachal Pradesh are closely related to Van Gujars in UP, HP & Uttarakhand. They often intermarry with each other.)

== History ==
In the Sikh traditions (1665–1703 CE), a story about Bhai Sahib Singh suggests that many Muslim Gujars lived in northern India and some may have become Muslim in the 16th and 17th centuries. The story mentions a Gujar chief named Jamatullah in Bidar, Karnataka; his Muslim name support the suggestion. The reported conflict between the Gujars and the Sikhs suggests presence of Gujars in the region.

=== Muslim Gujar dynasties ===
==== Swat Valley ====
In 1849 Saidu Baba, a Muslim saint of the Gujar Khatana community, became foremost religious and political figure in the Swat Valley. His descendants, the Mianguls, were later recognised as the hereditary rulers of the Swat (princely state) by the British in 1926. The state existed autonomously until it was dissolved and merged into Khyber Pakhtunkhwa province in 1969.

==== Poonch ====
In the 17th century, Abdur Razzak Khan was a Gujar chief of the Poonch region of Kashmir. He was the son of Abdul Fateh Khan. In the early 18th century Muslim Gujars, with Bomba and Khakha tribes from the lower Jehlum Valley, often attacked Kashmir. They raided the valley when the central government of Mughal Empire was weakened, killing and looting. These attacks terrified the people of Kashmir and the tribes names became synonymous with terror. During Ali Muhammad Khan's rule (1713–15), the Bomba chief with Gujar chief Abdur Razzak of Poonch region started causing trouble in Karna and Baramulla areas. Ali Muhammad Khan arrested the Gujar chief and Haibat Khan, the grandson of Bomba Chief. In 1732 during rule of Abu Barakat Khan again Haibat Khan raided but Abu Khan personally stopped him.

Inayatullah Kashmiri the noble of the Mughals lost control of Kashmir, and Abu Barakat Khan became new ruler of Kashmir. However, Inayat Ullah Khan did not give up. He formed an alliance with Bomba and Khakha tribes and attacked Abu Brakat Khan. Abu Brakat Khan then formed an alliance with the Gujars of Poonch and counterattacked in which they succeeded to kill Inayatullah Khan. Many people died on both sides the fierce battle, and ultimately after Inayat Ullah's death conflict was ended.

In the 1740s, Babarullah Khan of Baramulla became independent and with the support of Gujar, Bomba and Khakha tribes he raised rebellion against Abu Brakat Khan. Violence continued in the valley until new governor Abu Mansur Khan was appointed in 1745. Gujars, Bombas and Khakhas tribes continued raiding until 1846, when Maharaja Gulab Singh with the help of the British army stopped them.

In the 18th century a Gujar of Sangu clan, Roohullah Khan, established Sangu dynasty or state in Poonch region of Kashmir. During the reign of Raja Bahadur Khan, Ruhullah rose to such prominence that he was appointed the post of Wazir. In 1797, Abdullah Khan, the Nazim of Kashmir, attacked Poonch and appointed Wazir Ruhullah Khan as its ruler in 1798. Ruhullah Khan died in 1819 and was succeeded by his grandson Mir Baz Khan. Kashmiri historian Muhammad Din Fauq described Ruhullah Khan as a remarkable and brave ruler.

In June 1814 Ranjit Singh's army moved towards Poonch and Rajauri. But Ruhullah Khan, the ruler of Poonch prevented the Sikh artillery from passing through. A fight broke out and about 500 people were wounded or killed on both sides.

==== Hazara ====
In the early 18th century, a Gujar of the Khatana clan in the Hazara region was the chief of Kot Najeebullah. Later, he lost his jagir to Tareen tribe. In the 18th century, Ranjit Singh, the founder of the Sikh Empire, again granted Muqaddam Musharaf, the jagir of Kot Najeebullah consisting of eight villages in the Hazara region in exchange for 15,000 rupees. The villages comprised Kokalia, Pandori, Jharr, Dedra, Dingi, Chamba Pind-Gujran, Kot Najibullah and some other.

After the death of Muqaddam, General Sir James Abbott granted the jagir to his son, Mir Muqaddam Ahmad. Mir Ahmad died on 12 October 1849. After Ahmad's death, Jagir was given to his elder son, Mir Ghulam Muhammad. Ghulam Ahmad died on 1 May 1880, and later his jagir was given to his elder son, Mir Abdullah.

==== Nawab of Dera Ghazi Khan ====
In the 18th century, Mahmud Khan Gujar served as the de facto ruler and governor of Dera Ghazi Khan from around 1738 to 1772. He was the son of Yusuf Khan. Previously he served as a grand wazir under Mirranis. He teamed up with the Durranis to overthrow Mirranis and then initiated a project to build and restore canals in D. G. Khan. Punjab Government Gazetteer credit him with founding the settlement of Mahmud Kot and initiating canal works in the region.

==== Nawabs of Gujrat ====
During the 1857 unrest, Sultan Ali, a Gujjar leader of the Kalas clan in Ajnala, Gujrat, kept his area safe from looters. The British government rewarded him with land and the title of Safed Posh for his bravery. His son, Fazal-e-Ali, continued doing good work by building schools, hospitals, and banks. People loved and respected him so much that the British government gave him the title of Nawab. He was popularly known as Sir Syed of the Punjab region. Nawab Fazal Ali had two sons Nawab Mehdi Ali and Nawab Asghar Ali. Nawab Mehdi Ali died in 1958. Nawab Asghar Ali held several positions, including chairman of the District Board and Central Co-operative Bank. He also contributes to education by developing Zamindara High school into a degree college.

==== Haryana ====
Before partition, Muslim Gujars were zamindars in some parts of Indian Punjab and Haryana, such as in areas like Toda Bhim Pargana and villages including Umri, Umrah, Ujinah, Pur, and Pinangwan in Haryana.

=== British period ===
During the British Raj era, Gujars were classified as a martial race and enlisted in class company regiments.

According to William Crooke, Gujars were an important agricultural and pastoral tribe. They were found in many areas including: Gujar Khan, Gujrat and Gujranwala, named after Gujar community. They were also found in areas like Rawalpindi and Jalandhar where they mainly work as farmers.

Different British-colonial era writers note the Gujars for their farming skills. David Thomson reported the Gujjars in Jhelum District to be skilled farmers. Carolyn Stedman described the Gujjars in Rawalpindi district as excellent as cultivating.

Evenly Brikeley Howell noted that after 30 years of British Raj, Gujars were likely no more prone to crime than other farming groups. While many Gujars focus on herding animals rather than farming, this doesn't apply to all of them.

In the British colonial era, the Gujar community was divided into various clans. British administrator Denzil Ibbetson, in his work "Castes of Punjab", notes a total of nineteen notable clans of Gujjars in British Punjab. These clans include: Tanwar, Chokhar, Rawal, Kalsian, Khatana, Kasana, Kalas, Gorsi, Chechi, Dhodar, Poswal, Lawi, Bijar, Khaindar, Melu, Thakaria, Chauhan, Monana, and Bhumls. According to Horace Arthur Rose, Chechi and Kasana were the major clans of Gujars in the region of British Punjab.

==== 1857 Rebellion ====
In Indian Rebellion of 1857, the Muslim Gujars of Ludhiana district of Punjab, India took arms against British Raj in India. Some Muslim Gujars from Muzaffarnagar, and Saharanpur districts of Western Uttar Pradesh also participated in the 1857 war of independence. Gujars actively participated in the 1857 rebellion against the British government. Due to their involvement, they were classified by Britishers as a "criminal tribe" in the 1871 Criminal Tribes Act. They were denotified from criminal tribe list in 1949.

According to British orientalist William Crooke, Gujars were always against the British government, who they saw as unfair. When the British power wreaked in Indian subcontinent during the Indian rebellion of 1857, Gujars took advantage and looted and burned British areas. He viewed Gujars as having criminal nature.

The Britishers believed that nomadic groups like Gujars of Himalayas survived mainly by stealing because they did not have a fixed way to earn a living. However, this view ignored the fact that these communities made a living through herding animals. British officials claimed that these groups were a "Criminal class" that needed to be stopped because they were openly stealing.

The Britishers had several reasons to target Nomad Gujjars of Himalayas and similar groups. They were worried because, Gujjars were monadic and hard to control. Their nomadic lifestyle conflicted with British plans for farming and land ownership. They might rebel, like they did in Indian Rebellion of 1857, which threatened the British rule in Indian subcontinent. According to David Arnold, the Britishers wanted to control these groups socially through Criminal Tribe Act rather than because they were truly criminal.

==== 1947 Partition ====
During the 1947 Partition of India, many Muslim Gujars were massacred in the Jammu region. Survivors fled to Pakistan, but most Gujars in Poonch, Rajauri, and Kashmir division stayed in their homes.

In the 1947 Partition of India, communal violence broke out in Jammu and Kashmir. Muslim soldiers were disarmed, while soldiers of other faith were not. According to Ian Stephens, Maharaja Hari Singh supported violence against 'Muslim Gujars' and even ordered his forces to fire at them. Eyewitnesses also accused Hari Singh of directly participating in killings, including shooting three 'Muslim Gujars' at Mishriwala.

1947 partition of India changed the demographic structure of Gujars in Indian Punjab. Before partition, 75% of Gujars in Punjab region were Muslims, and most of them migrated to Pakistani Punjab, changing the community's makeup in Indian Punjab.

After the partition of India many Muslim Gujars migrated from Indian Punjab, Haryana, Jammu and Kashmir and Himachal Pradesh to Pakistan. Before the partition of Punjab in 1947, Gurdaspur became part of Indian Punjab 80 villages of the Muslim Gujjars migrated from Gurdaspur to Sialkot in Punjab, Pakistan. Some other Muslim Gujjars from other districts of Indian Punjab also migrated to Pakistani Punjab and settled in Sheikhupura and Sargodha districts.

In 1947, some Bakarwal and Van Gujar families also migrated from Jammu and Kashmir, Uttarakhand, and Himachal Pradesh to the northern areas of Pakistan.

=== Modern period ===
After 1940, in Nuristan Province in eastern Afghanistan, Gujars engaged in conflict with Nuristani people over land disputes. Nuristanis had allowed the Gujjars to use their pastures in exchange for livestock payments, but the Gujjars stopped honouring this agreement in the late 1940s. Since then, conflicts between the two ethnic groups have been ongoing, with frequent violence and theft. The Nuristanis believe when the Afghan Government officials try to intervene, they often favour the Gujjars, which the Nuristanis leaders see as a deliberate attempt to divide and control the Nuristani tribes.

In the 1980s due to rivalry with Pashtuns and Kohistanis, Gujar leaders were allied with the Russians during Soviet union Invasion of Afghanistan. Because of this, Pashtuns and Kohistanis did not trust them. But, these three ethnic groups also had their own internal conflicts and often fought with each other.

== Demographics ==
In 1988, it was estimated that Muslim Gujjars constitute 53 per cent of the total Gurjar population.

=== Afghanistan ===
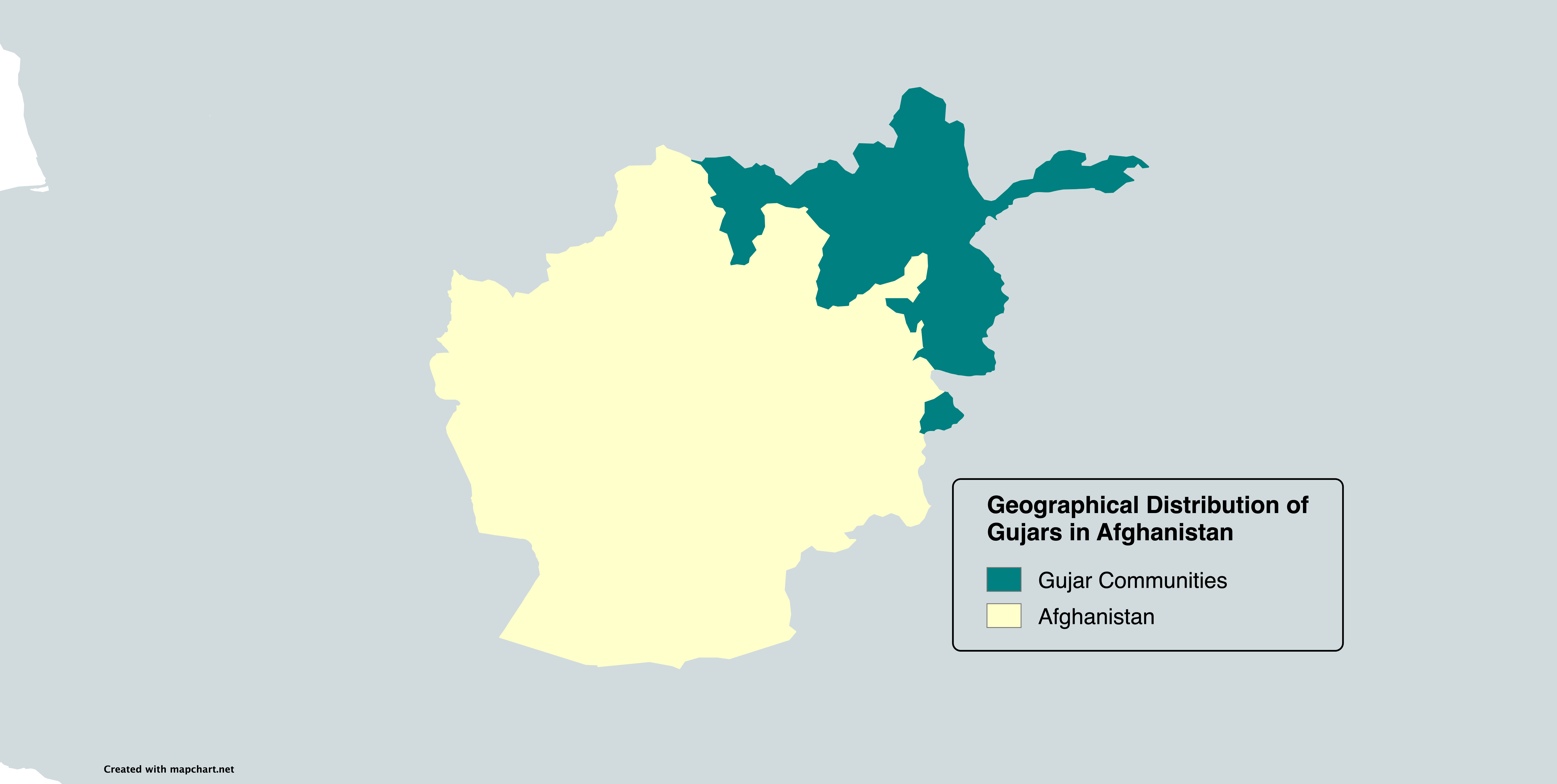
Geographical distribution of Gujars in Afghanistan

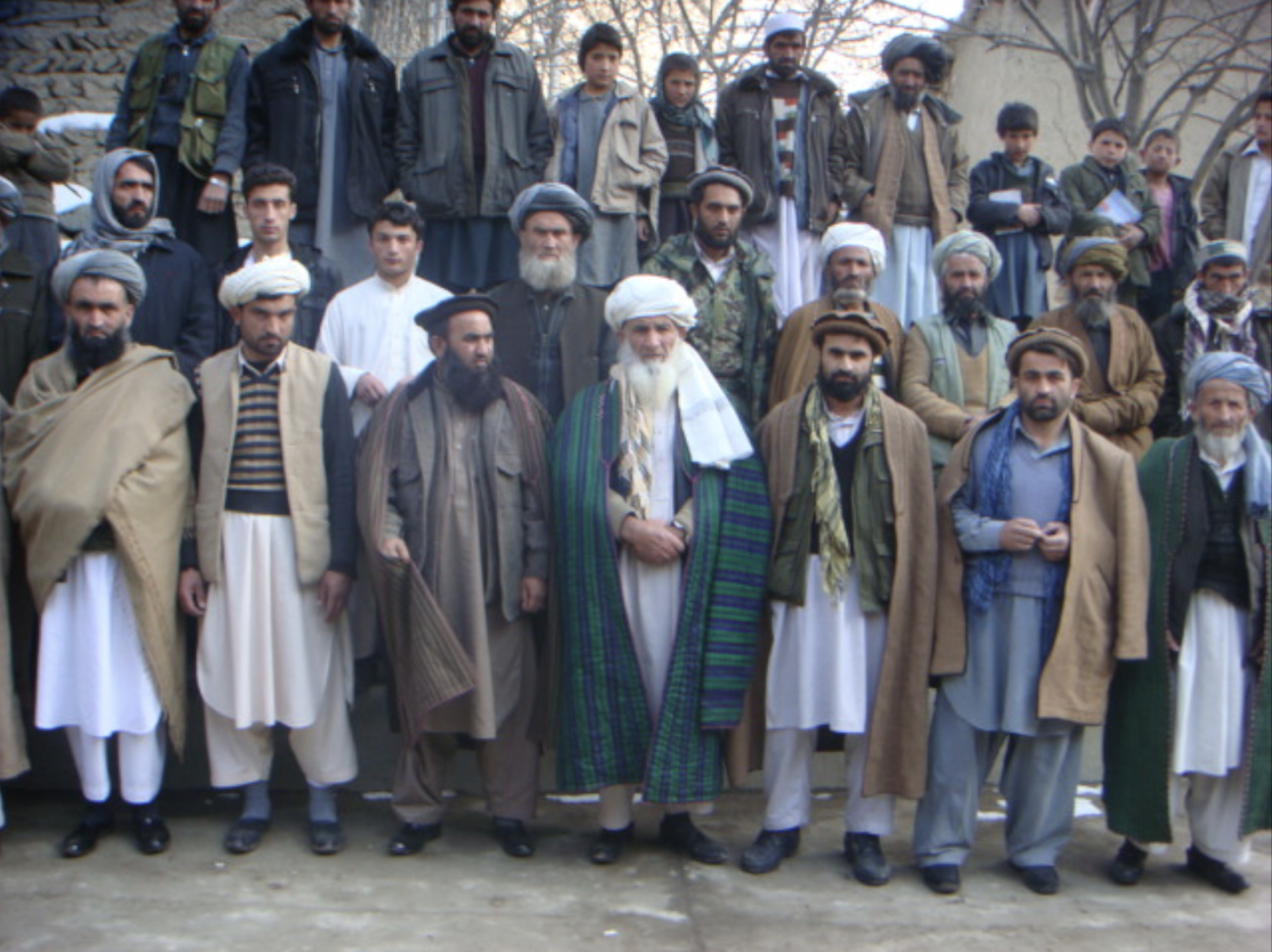
Gathering of Gujar tribal people in northern Afghanistan

The Gujar people have lived in Afghanistan for centuries, with an estimated 1.5 million residing in the country today. They primarily inhabit the northeastern regions, including provinces like Kapisa, Baghlan, Balkh, Kunduz, Takhar, Badakhshan, Nuristan, Laghman, Nangarhar, Kunar, and Khost. In some areas of Afghanistan and Kunar province local radio stations air programs in Gujari, Nuristani and other languages.

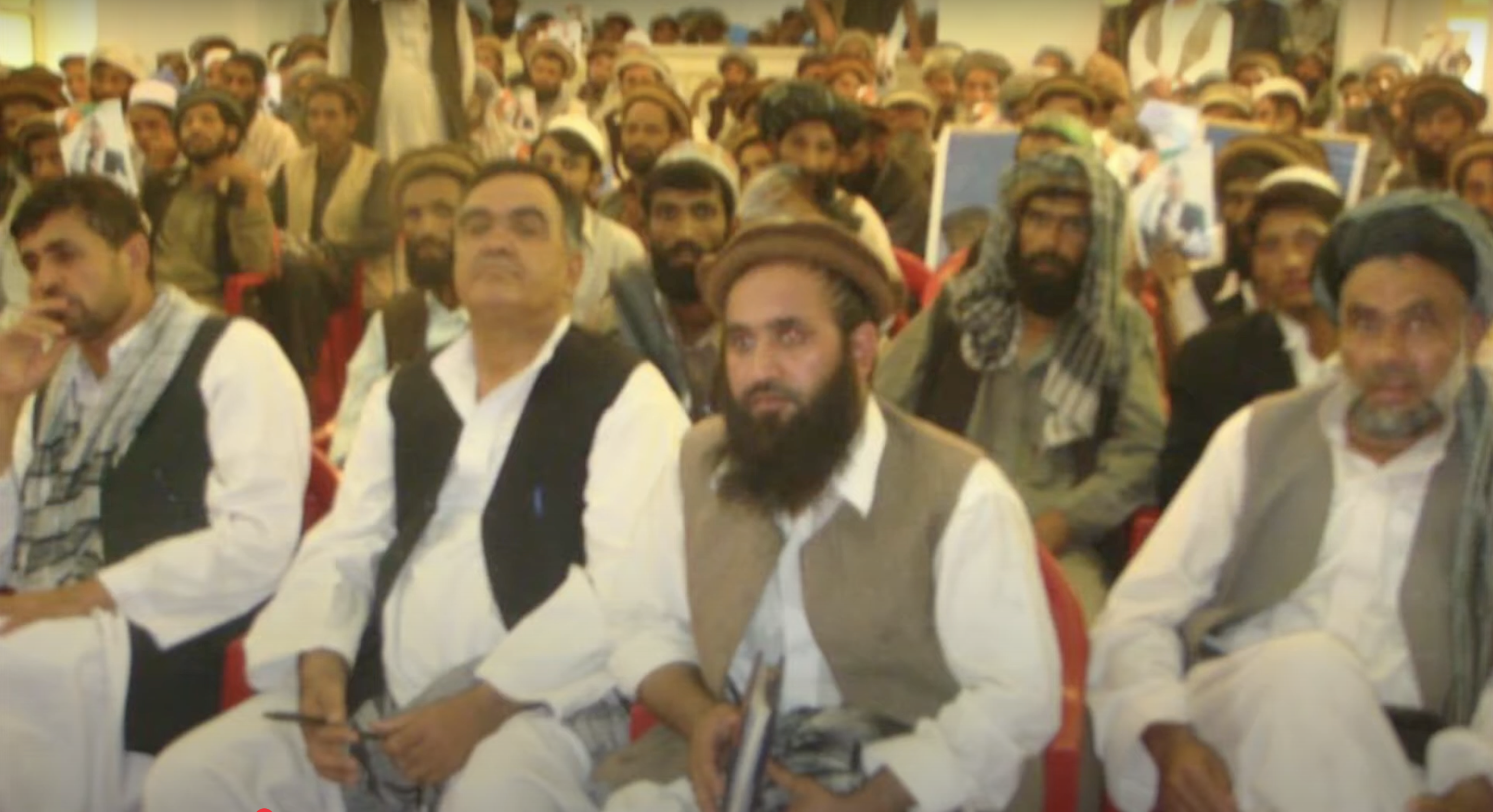
Traditional Jirga of the Gujars in Afghan Society

In Upper Asqalan, local elders once requested a former mujahideen commander to take on the role of a Taliban commander to provide protection and leadership for their area (interview, 20 July 2007). Similarly, in Burka, the leaders of the prominent mir family in Kokah Bulaq reached an agreement with a Gujar commander—who had previously fought alongside them during the resistance against Soviet forces—to assume responsibility as the Taliban commander for the Full Valley, with the aim of safeguarding the local population (interviews, 5 September 2007 and 26 March 2009).

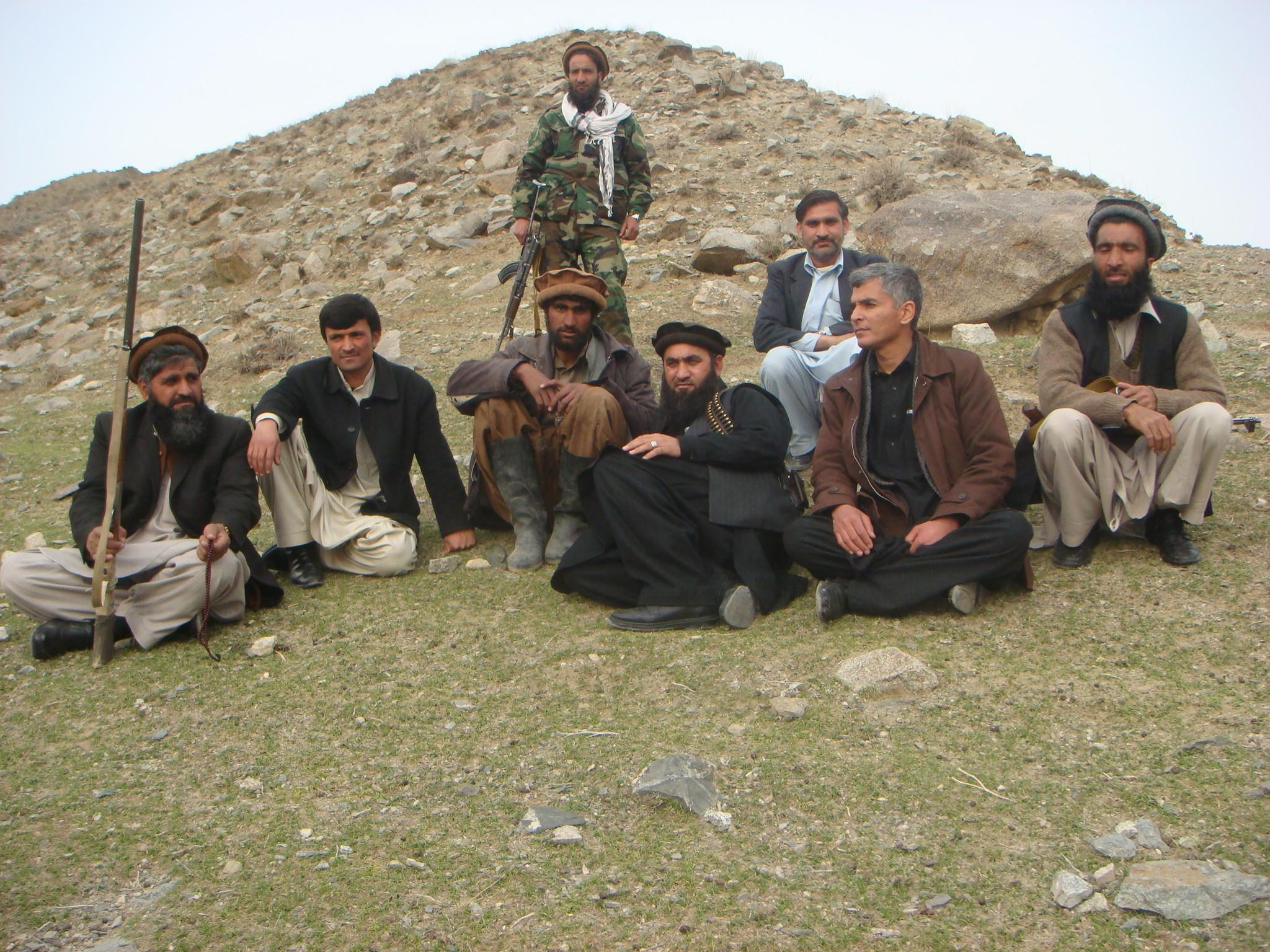
Group of tribal Gujar people gathered in North Eastern Afghanistan

During the Rohilla rule (c. 1720–1770), horse breeding flourished alongside agricultural growth in the region. Gujars, along with Bhattis, played an important role as roaming traders who helped maintain the quality of local horse breeds by bringing in stallions and mares from regions like Punjab, Afghanistan, and Turkistan. Their involvement contributed to the strength of the regional breeding economy, which supported military demands.

=== Pakistan ===
Among eighteenth Pakistani ethnic groups found across four provinces, the Gujar is one of the largest ethnic group in Pakistan. An estimated 20% of Pakistan's population is Gujars.

They enjoy good status in Pakistani society and in numbers their population is estimated to be 33 million.

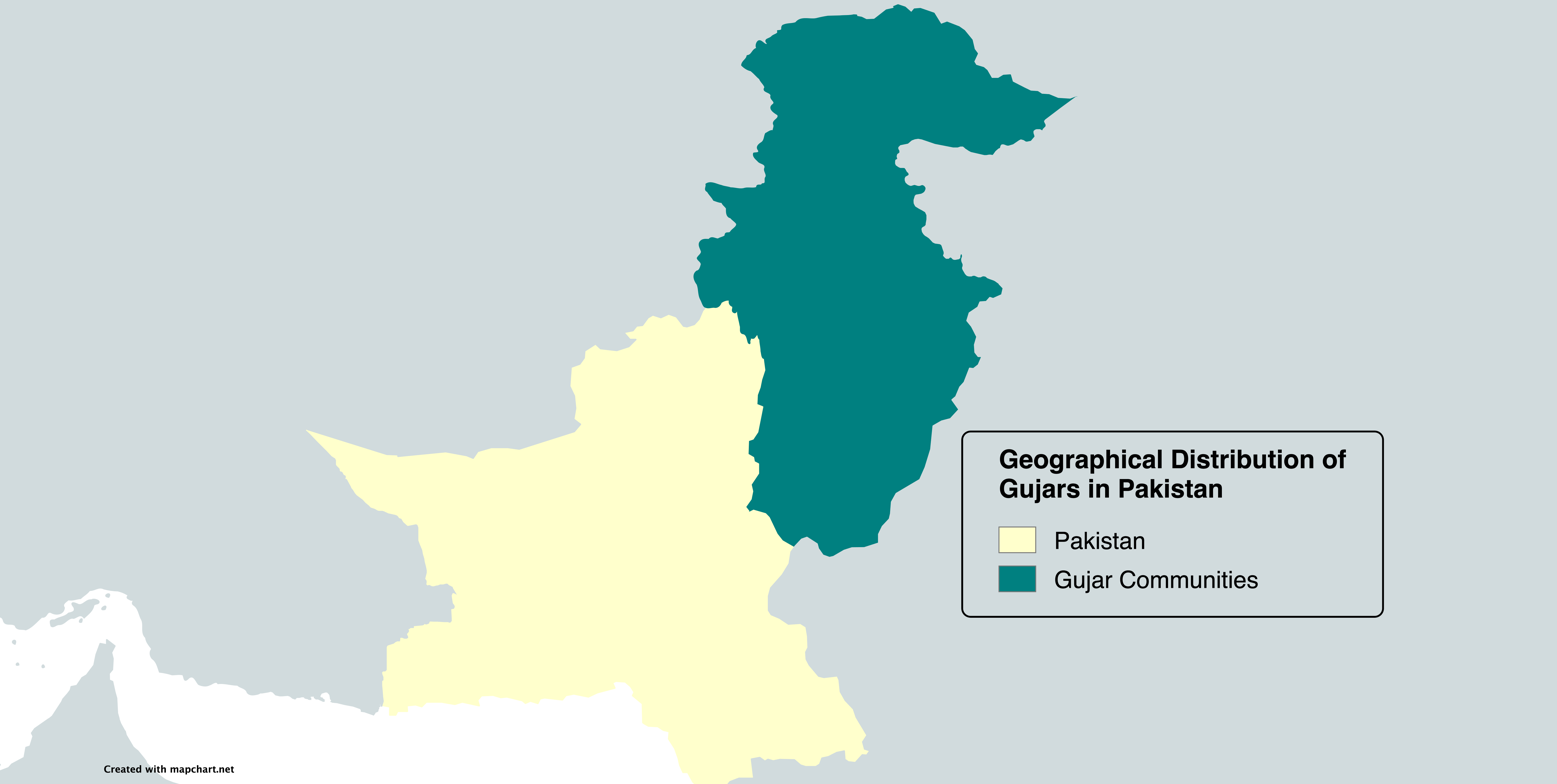
Geographical distribution of Gujars in Pakistan

In 1999, British anthropologist Stephen Lyon estimated that the Gujar population in Pakistan was around 30 million. He also introduced the concept of "Gujarism"—the idea that Gujars in Pakistan are aware of their distinct identity and frequently engage in social activities, including local political participation, based on this awareness, a phenomenon he refers to as kin-network activism.

==== Punjab, Pakistan ====
The Gujars of Punjab racially belonged to the Indo-Aryan race. In Punjab, their primary occupation is agriculture, while many are also engaged in small businesses, local politics, and government jobs.

They are found across all divisions of Punjab and primarily in the districts of Faisalabad, Rawalpindi, Taxila, Jhelum, Gujar Khan, Sialkot, Lahore, Sheikhupura, Okara, Layyah, Narowal, Muzaffargarh, Multan, Bahawalpur, Bahawalnagar, Gujrat, Gujranwala, Rahim Yar Khan, Jhang, Dera Ghazi Khan, Mianwali, Khushab, Sargodha, Sahiwal, Toba Tek Singh. In northern Punjab, their population is estimated at 2.3 million, with additional populations found in central, eastern and southern Punjab.

They have lent their name to several places in Punjab, Pakistan; these places include Gujranwala, Gujarat, Gujar Khan, and Gojra, among others.

In Punjab they follow the ideology kinship of Gujjarism that helps them in building influence in local politics of Punjab.

==== Historical population ====
Population of Muslim Gujjars recorded in different census reports of the British India for present-day Punjab, Pakistan.

Historical population
Year	Pop.	±% p.a.
1911	201,995	—
1921	208,078	+0.30%
1931	227,015	+0.87%
source: 1911 census - 1921 census - 1931 census

==== Khyber Pakhtunkhwa ====
Gujjars are also present in Khyber Pakhtunkhwa, where they're the third largest ethnic groups after the Pashtuns and the Awan, found in the Hazara region as well places like Dir, Swat, and Bajaur, often being conversant in Pashto, the provincial language.

In Khyber Pakhtunkhwa their settlements are found in various regions, including Hazara, Chitral, Kohistan, Waziristan, Fatah and other areas of KPK. They are predominantly found in the districts of Dera Ismail Khan, Chitral, Hangu, Kohat, Peshawar, Mansehra, Malakand, Abottabad, Battagram, Haripur, Upper Dir, Lowe Sir, Charsadha, Shangla and Swat.

In Swat, Pir Samiullah was a Gujjar community leader who was the first to raise a private tribal army against the Pakistani Taliban, with around 10,000 men, but was eventually defeated and executed by the Taliban in 2008, who then desecrated his dead body by hanging it publicly.

They speak Pashto and Gujari language in main areas of Khyber Pakhtunkhwa, in Hazara they speak Hindko and Gujari language, while in Chitral valley they speak Kohistani, Chitrali and Gujari language.

In the Hazara region of Khyber Pakhtunkhwa, Gujjar is a largest ethnic group and the oldest inhabitants of the region. According to 1931 census of India in the Hazara region Gujjars make up to 15% in the entire population of the region.

Gujjar Qaumi Movement (GQM), a Gujjar organisation based in the Lower Dir District of Khyber Pakhtunkhwa, filed a petition in the peshawar high court, demanding for the inclusion of Gujari language in the list of 2023 census forum. The court ordered the provincial government to include the Gujari language, but the remains unimplemented.

==== Historical population ====
Population of Muslim Gujjars recorded in different census reports of the British India for North-West Frontier Province (now Khyber Pakhtunkhwa, Pakistan).

Historical population
Year	Pop.	±% p.a.
1911	113,571	—
1921	85,590	−2.79%
1931	121,510	+3.57%
source: 1911 census - 1921 census - 1931 census

==== Azad Kashmir ====
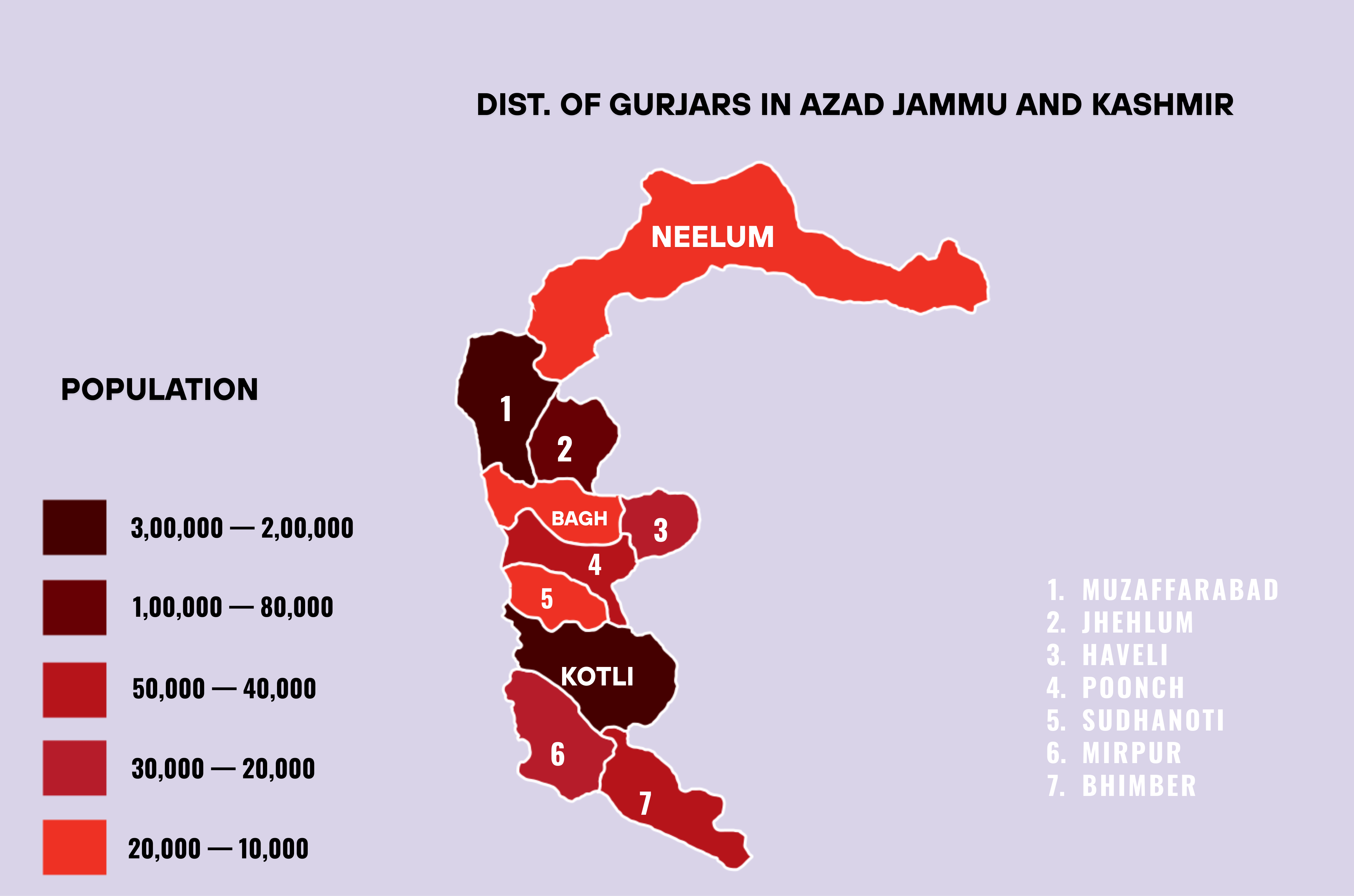
Distributions of Gujjars in Azad Jammu and Kashmir

In Azad Kashmir, they are single largest ethnic community of the region, with a population of 800,000, and they found in almost across all districts of AJK.

Their population is mainly found in Poonch, Sandutti, Kotli, Mirpur, Muzaffarabad, and Bhimber districts. In Azad Kashmir they use titles like Sardar, Malik, Mian, Khan, Rana and Choudhary.

Muslim Gujars have influence in local politics of the state, In 2021 in the state assembly election of Azad Jammu and Kashmir many Gujar politicians were elected.

==== Historical population ====
Population of Muslim Gujars recorded in different census reports of the British India for present-day Pakistan administrated Azad Jammu and Kashmir. Now their population in Azad Kashmir is approximately 8,00,000.

Historical population
Year	Pop.	±% p.a.
1901	77,612	—
1911	62,287	−2.18%
1921	81,031	+2.67%
1931	81,763	+0.09%
2005	800,000	+3.13%
source: 1901 census - 1911 census - 1921 census - 1931 census - 2005 sources

==== Gilgit Baltistan ====
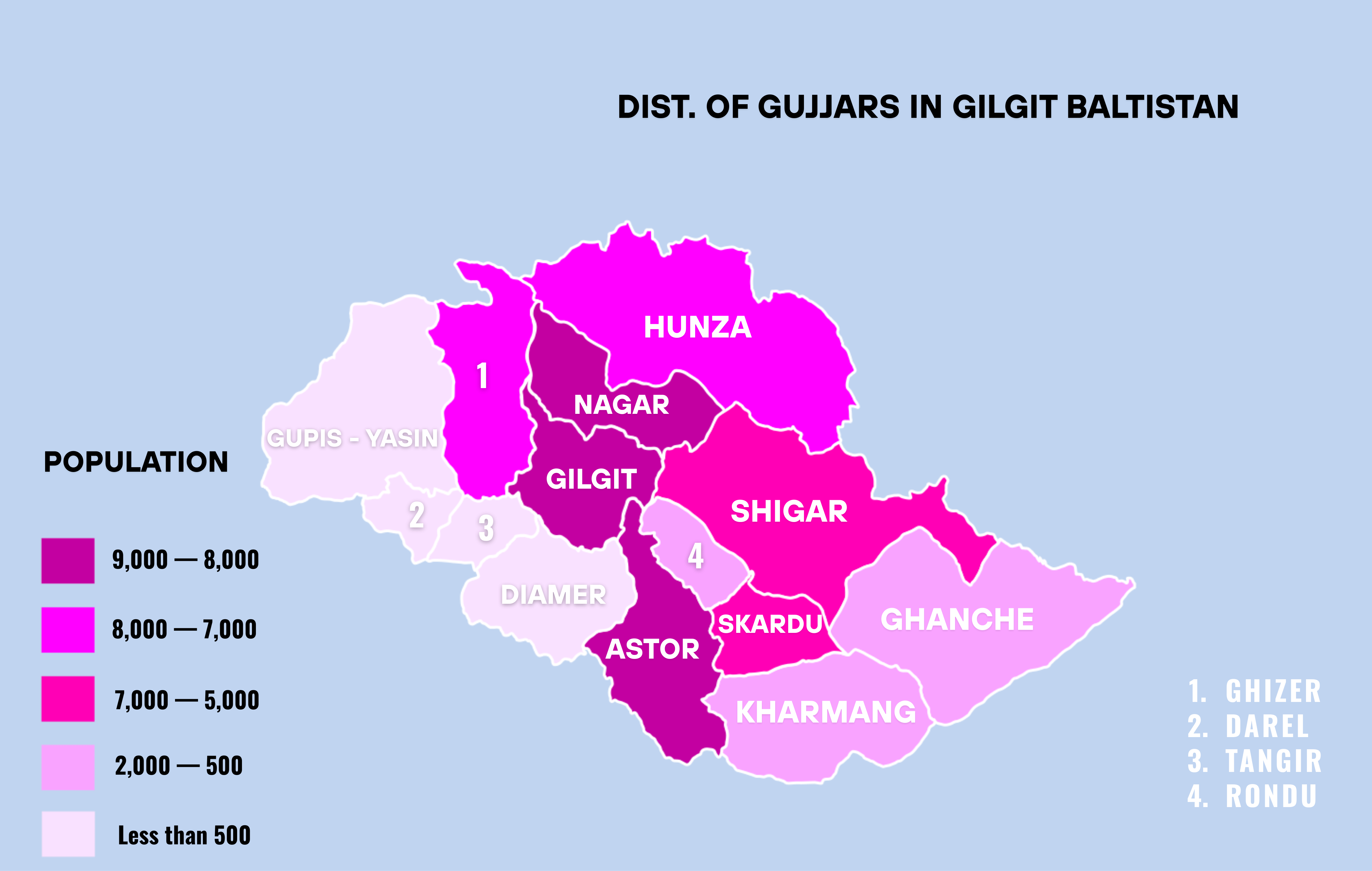
Distribution of Muslim Gujjars in Gilgit-Baltistan

In Gilgit-Baltistan, they are primarily settled in Naltar, Ghizer, and Astore. They migrated over a century ago from Swat, Kohistan in Khyber Pakhtunkhwa. They rely on farming and livestock rearing, and are known for their unique tradition of carving wooden coffins. They mostly speak two major languages Shina and Gujari.

They are mainly found in Ghizer, Nagar, Shighar, Gilgit, and Hunza districts, and Naltar Valley. There are no restrictions among the women of Muslim Gujars in the region for the following of Islamic tradition of Purdah. They speak Shina language in the areas of Gilgit district and Khowar language near the Shandpur Pass.

The Gujars of Gilgit Valley are believed to have migrated from Kashmir and Baltistan, along with the Dom people.

==== Historical population ====
Population of Muslim Gujjars recorded in different census reports of the British India for present-day Pakistan administrated Gilgit-Baltistan.

Historical population
Year	Pop.	±% p.a.
1901	2,032	—
1911	3,018	+4.04%
1921	3,507	+1.51%
1931	3,098	−1.23%
source: 1901 census - 1911 census - 1921 census - 1931 census

==== Sindh ====
In Sind they are mainly found in the rural Sind including the districts of Mirpur-Mathelo dis, Tharparkar, Sangar, Mithi and Hyderabad. In Hyderabad and Karachi there are also some Gujars mostly migrated from Kashmir, Khyber Pakhtunkhwa, Balochistan and Punjab for business purposes.

==== Balochistan ====
The Gujjars are also found in the Balochistan province of Pakistan, mainly in the districts of Kalat, Jhalawan, Sibi, Quetta, Kuzdhar, Awaran, Makran, and Gawadar. In Makran, Balochistan Gujjars follow Zikrism sect of Shi'a Islam rest of others in Balochistan follow Sunni Islam and speak Balochi language.

In Balochistan Muslim Gujars claimed to be the original inhabitants of the region but they were likely settled in the region and came here during the rule of Mughal emperor Akbar.

=== India ===
Muslim Gujars mainly live in north Indian states, including Jammu and Kashmir, Himachal Pradesh, Uttarakhand, Uttar Pradesh, Punjab and Haryana. They speak the Gujari language and have their own distinct culture.

==== British India ====
In 1931 census of the British India there were 10,60,068 (1.06 million) Muslim Gujjars living mainly in Jammu and Kashmir, Punjab, Delhi, and North-West Frontier Province (present-day Khyber Pakhtunkhwa province of Pakistan). (Note: In 1931 census of India their population was recorded as 9,86,369 (for Kashmir, Punjab, Dehli, & KPK) including +73,699 for United Provinces/UP. their total population was '10,60,068'.)

==== Historical population ====
Population of Muslim Gujjars recorded in different census reports of British India.

Historical population
Year	Pop.	±% p.a.
1901	927,547	—
1911	955,150	+0.29%
1921	982,465	+0.28%
1931	1,060,068	+0.76%
source: 1901 census - 1911 census - 1921 census - 1931 census

==== Historical population ====
Population of Muslim Gujjars recorded in different census reports of the British India for Kashmir (princely state) (in present-day disputed region of Kashmir in India, Pakistan and China).

Historical population
Year	Pop.	±% p.a.
1891	215,796	—
1901	286,109	+2.86%
1911	328,003	+1.38%
1921	362,107	+0.99%
1931	402,781	+1.07%
source: 1891 census - 1901 census - 1911 census - 1921 census - 1931 census

==== Jammu and Kashmir ====
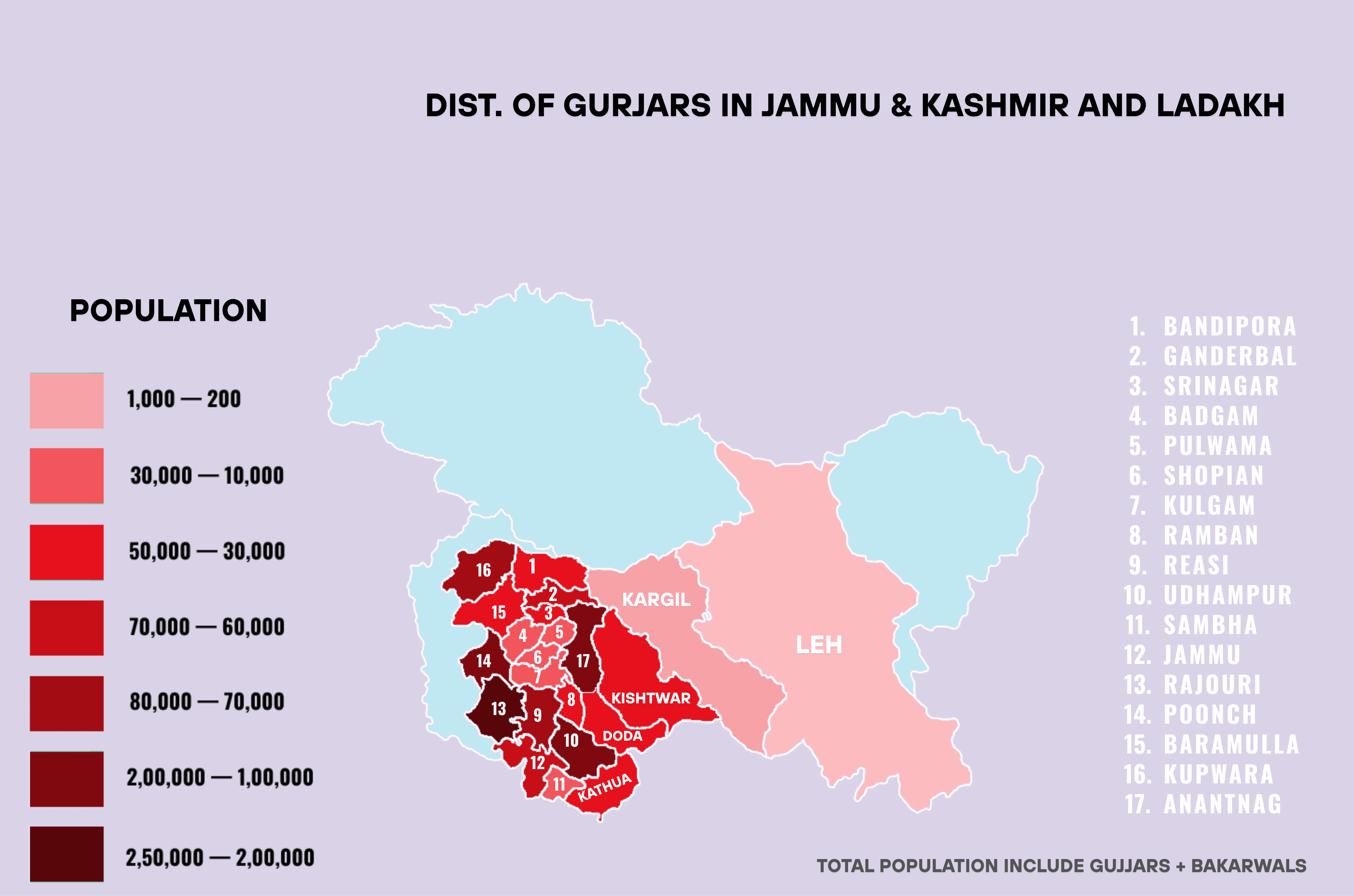
Distributions of Gujars in Jammu and Kashmir

The Gujars of Jammu and Kashmir are a predominantly Muslim community. In Kashmir they are the third-largest ethnic community after Dogari and Pahari speaking linguistic groups.

Gujjars constitute approximately 88% of the total tribal population in Jammu and Kashmir, with an estimated population of 20-25% of the state's total population and they are located in all districts of Indian administrated Kashmir. The community is scattered across the state, with the largest concentration in Poonch (40%) and Rajouri (33.1%), while they are absent in the Leh district.

In Jammu and Kashmir, Gujjars are predominantly Muslims and are divided into settled, nomadic, and agro-pastoralists groups. These Nomadic Gujjars are further divided into Bakarwal, Van Gujars, and Dodhi subgroups.

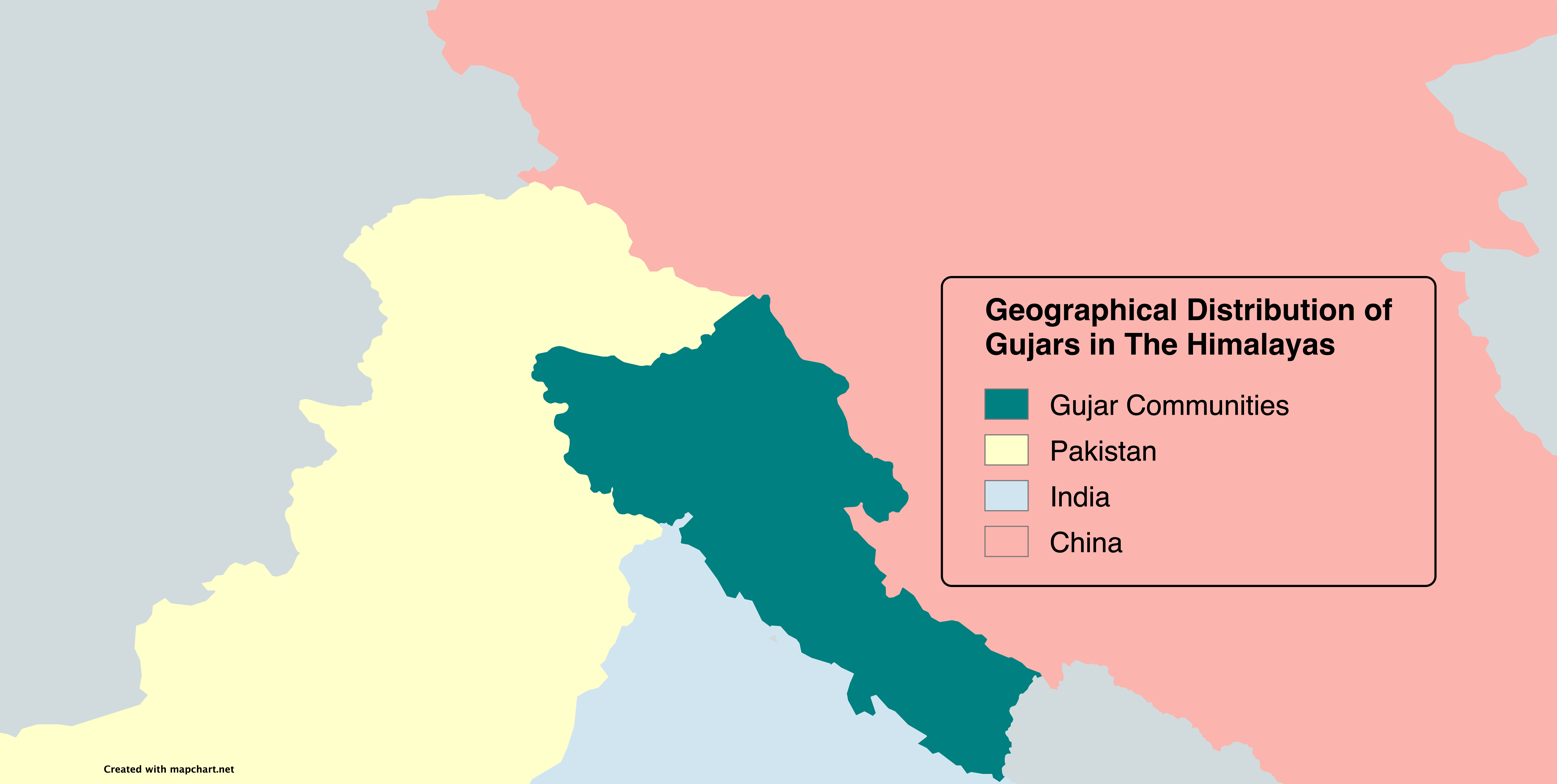
Geographical Distribution of Gujars in the Indian Himalayan states of, Jammu and Kashmir, Ladakh, Uttarakhand, Himachal Pradesh

There are notable population of the Gujjars spread throughout the state. Their settlements are mostly found in the valleys of Kangam, Kukernag, Kanghan, Tral, Doru, Pahalgam, Shopian, Kulgam, Handwara, Karnah, Kupwara. Also in all Tehsils of Uri district, tehsils of Haveli, Naushera, Sunderbani, Mendhar, and in the districts of Poonch, Rajouri, Udhampur, Kathua, Soda, Gool, Bhaderwah and Kishtwar.

Muslim Gujjars in Jammu and Kashmir have a significant presence in government jobs, local politics and prestigious careers like policing.

==== Historical population ====
Population of Muslim Gujjars recorded in different census reports of the British India for present-day Indian administrated Jammu and Kashmir.

Historical population
Year	Pop.	±% p.a.
1901	206,138	—
1911	262,613	+2.45%
1921	277,624	+0.56%
1931	317,920	+1.36%
source: 1901 census - 1911 census - 1921 census - 1931 census

==== Himachal Pradesh ====
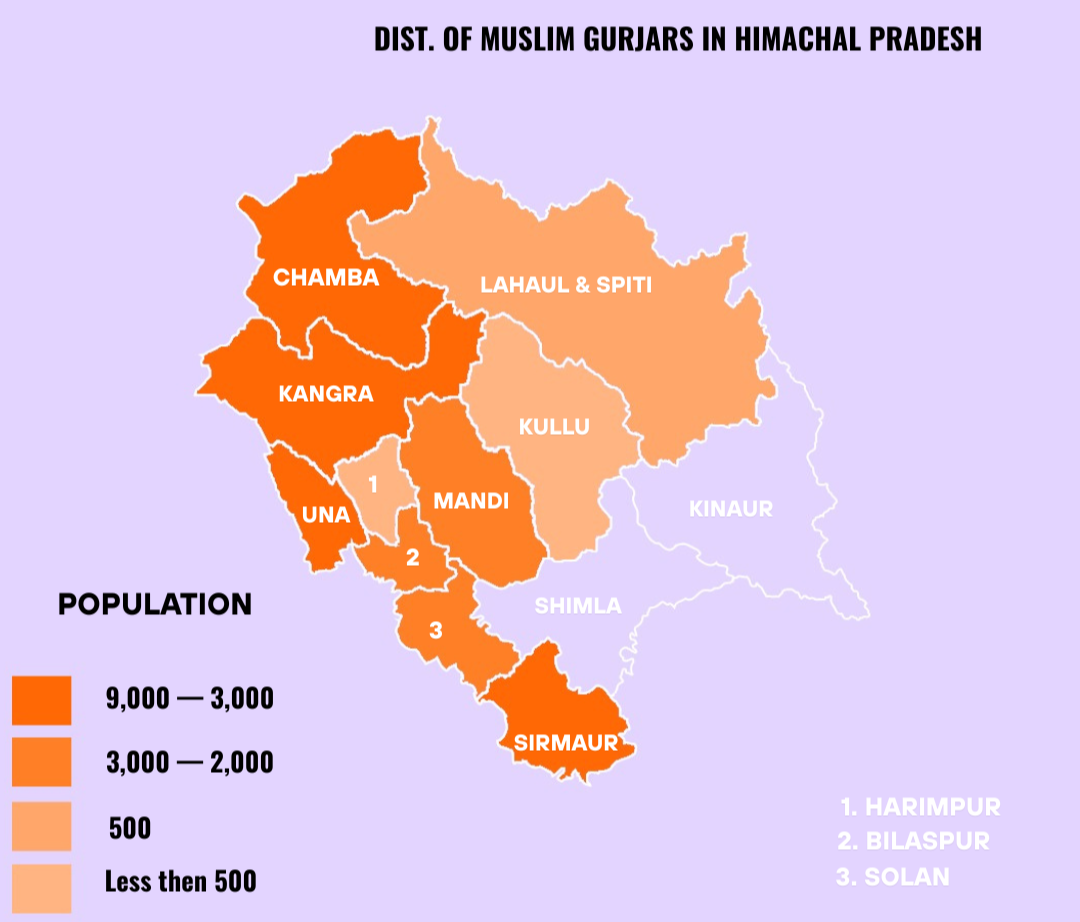
Distributions of Muslim Gurjars in Himachal Pradesh

Muslim Gujjars are found in the Himalayan state of Himachal Pradesh, which borders Jammu and Kashmir and Tibet. Muslim Gujjars constitute a significant proportion of the Gujjar community in Himachal Pradesh, making up approximately 86 per cent of their population.

The Muslim Gujjars are predominantly found in Kangra, Chamba and Sirmaur and make up to 100% districts population. They are also found in good numbers in Solan and Bilaspur districts.

In 2001, the Himachal Pradesh Government granted Scheduled Tribe status to the Gujjar community. As per the 2011 census out of the state's Scheduled Tribe population of 2,92,126, Gujjars accounted for 92,547 individuals, comprising 23.6% of the state's Scheduled Tribe population. Approximately 86% of the total Gurjar population in Himachal Pradesh are Muslim and 14% are Hindu, in numbers their population is 79,590.

The majority of them are nomadic, with a smaller number of settled Muslim Gujjars. Traditionally, they are pastoralists, moving with their livestock across the region's mountainous terrain.

==== Historical population ====
Population of Muslim Gujjars recorded in different census reports of the British India for present-day Indian state of Himachal Pradesh.

Historical population
Year	Pop.	±% p.a.
1911	29,041	—
1921	18,206	−4.56%
1931	18,539	+0.18%
2011/19	79,590	+1.84%
source: 1911 census - 1921 census - 1931 census - 2011 census (Note: In the 2011 census, the total Gujjar population of Himachal Pradesh was 92,547, out of which 86% are Muslims, which is 79590.)

==== Punjab, India ====
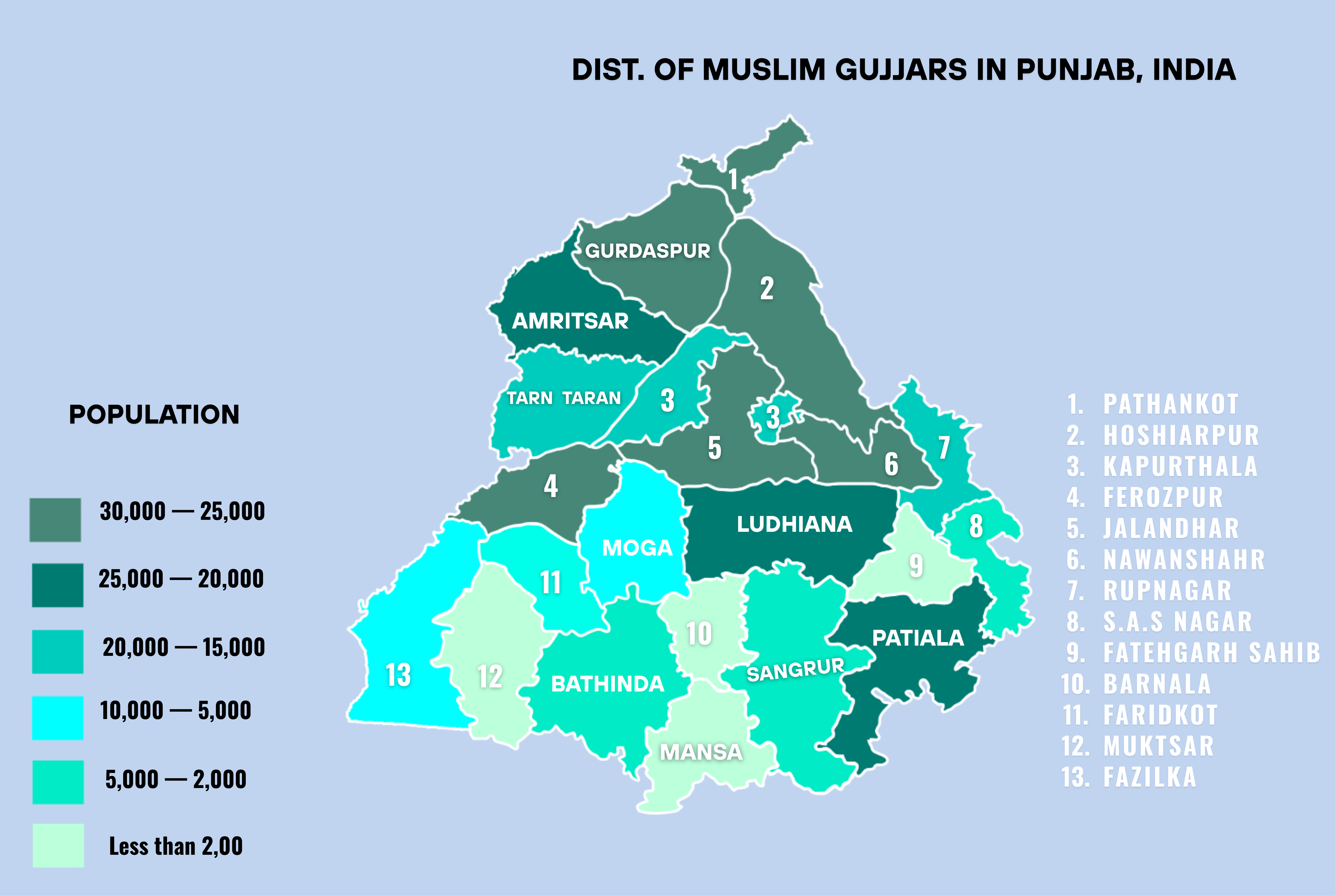
Distributions of Muslim Gujjars in Punjab, India

In the Indian state of Punjab Gujjars are mostly found in the Kandi region that covers the districts of Ludhiana, Tarn Taran, Hoshiarpure, Gurdaspur, Mohali, Rupnagar, and Nawanshahr. Beside Kandi region their population is also found in Amritsar, Bathinda and Malerkotla, Dasuya, and Pathankot districts. They are mostly Muslim some are Sikh and Hindu. In Punjab they belong to settled class of Punjabi farmers. In recent years some Muslim Gujjars are also migrated from Jammu and Kashmir.

In Kandi region there are total one hundred fifty five settlements and one hundred eighteen are of Gujjars.

Before the partition of Punjab in 1947, Gurdaspur became part of Indian Punjab eighty villages of the Muslim Gujjars migrated from Gurdaspur to Sialkot in Punjab, Pakistan. Some other Muslim Gujjars from other districts of Punjab, India migrated to Pakistani Punjab and settled in Sheikhupura and Sargodha districts.

In Punjab along with Hindu and Sikh Gujjars, they are listed in Other backward classes list of the State government.

In 1951 census, the total Gurjar population in Punjab, India was 4,37,706. As per same census, 66.62% of the Gurjars followed Islam, while 33.38% were Hindus. The total Muslim Gujjar population was 2,91,601, (out of Punjab's total population of 91,60,500).

==== Historical population ====
Population of Muslim Gujjars recorded in different census reports of Indian Punjab.

Historical population
Year	Pop.	±% p.a.
1911	183,144	—
1921	202,402	+1.00%
1931	230,474	+1.31%
1951	291,601	+1.18%
source: 1911 census - 1921 census - 1931 census - 1951 census

==== Ladakh ====
The Muslim Gujjars and Bakarwal communities in Ladakh are miniority ethnic-group in areas like Rangdum in Indian administrated Union territory of Ladakh. Recently, disputes over land encroachment and unauthorised construction have arisen. In 2024, the Lieutenant Governor of Ladakh intervened to address these issues, including the illegal occupation of grazing land and the ongoing legal dispute over land rights in the region.

==== Historical population ====
Population of Muslim Gujjars recorded in different census reports of the British India for present-day Indian administrated Ladakh.

Historical population
Year	Pop.	±% p.a.
1901	2,000	—
1911	85	−27.08%
1921	15	−15.92%
source: 1901 census - 1911 census - 1921 census

==== Uttarakhand ====
The Muslim Van Gujjars of Uttarakhand, with a population of around 70,000, are a semi-nomadic pastoral community living mainly in the Shivalik Hills, bordering Tibet. Traditionally herders, they practice transhumance, migrating with their buffalo herds between the foothills in winter and alpine pastures in summer. Known for being lactovegetarians, they rely solely on milk from their buffaloes. Despite the Indian Forest Rights Act of 2006 granting them forest land rights, they face conflicts with state authorities over access to reserved parks. The community distinguishes itself from other Gujjars by adopting the prefix "Van" ("forest-dwelling") in the 1980s.

In the 1931 census, the total population of Gurjars in Indian state of Uttarakhand was 2,210, of which 1,397 were Muslims, making up 63.21% of the total Gurjar population.

==== Historical population ====
Population of Muslim Gujjars recorded in different census reports of the British India for present-day Indian state of Uttarakhand.

Historical population
Year	Pop.	±% p.a.
1901	354	—
1911	789	+8.34%
1921	1,465	+6.38%
1931	1,397	−0.47%
2011/2020	70,000	+5.01%
source: 1901 census - 1911 census - 1921 census - 1931 census

==== Haryana ====
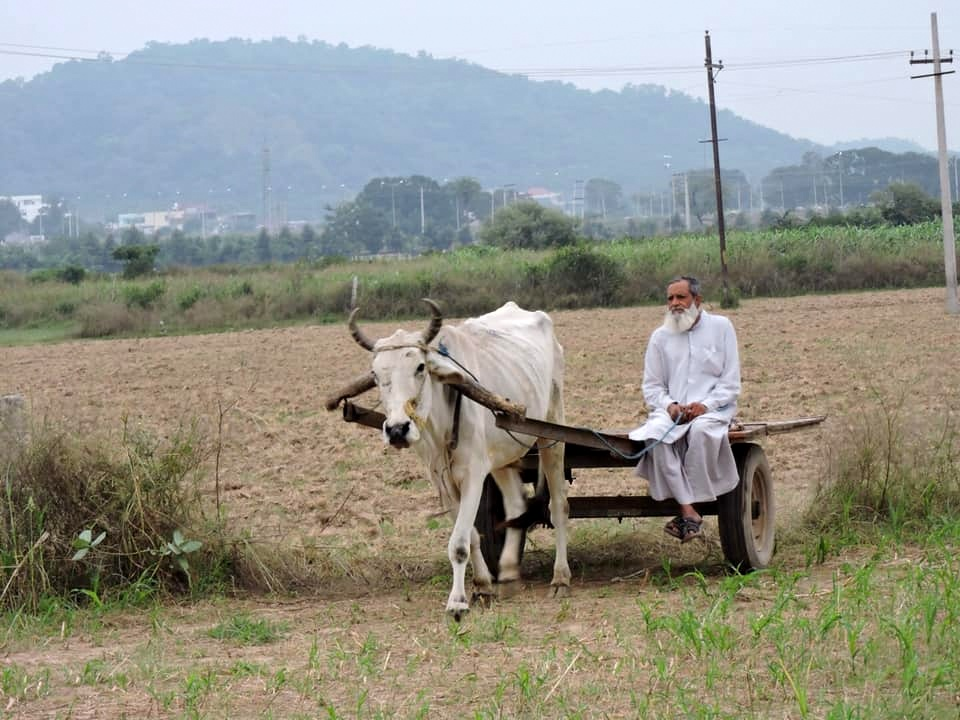
A Muslim Gujjar farmer from Haryana

Muslim Gujars in Haryana live in several districts, including Nuh, Gurgaon, Hisar, Sirsa, Rohtak, Karnal, and Ambala. Approximately one million Muslim Gujjars live in Ambala, Hisar, and Nuh, as well as in Delhi.

The Ambala district constituency has a sizeable number of Gurjars voters, with around 14,000 Hindu Gujjars and 6,500 Muslim Gujjars, giving them considerable voting power in the district.

In the 1931 census, the total population of Gurjars in Haryana state was '137,706', of which 47,479 were Muslims, making up 34.48% of the total Gurjar population.

==== Historical population ====
Population of Muslim Gujjars recorded in different census reports of the British India for present-day Indian state of Haryana.

Historical population
Year	Pop.	±% p.a.
1911	29,041	—
1921	18,706	−4.30%
1931	47,479	+9.76%
source: 1911 census - 1921 census - 1931 census

==== Uttar Pradesh ====
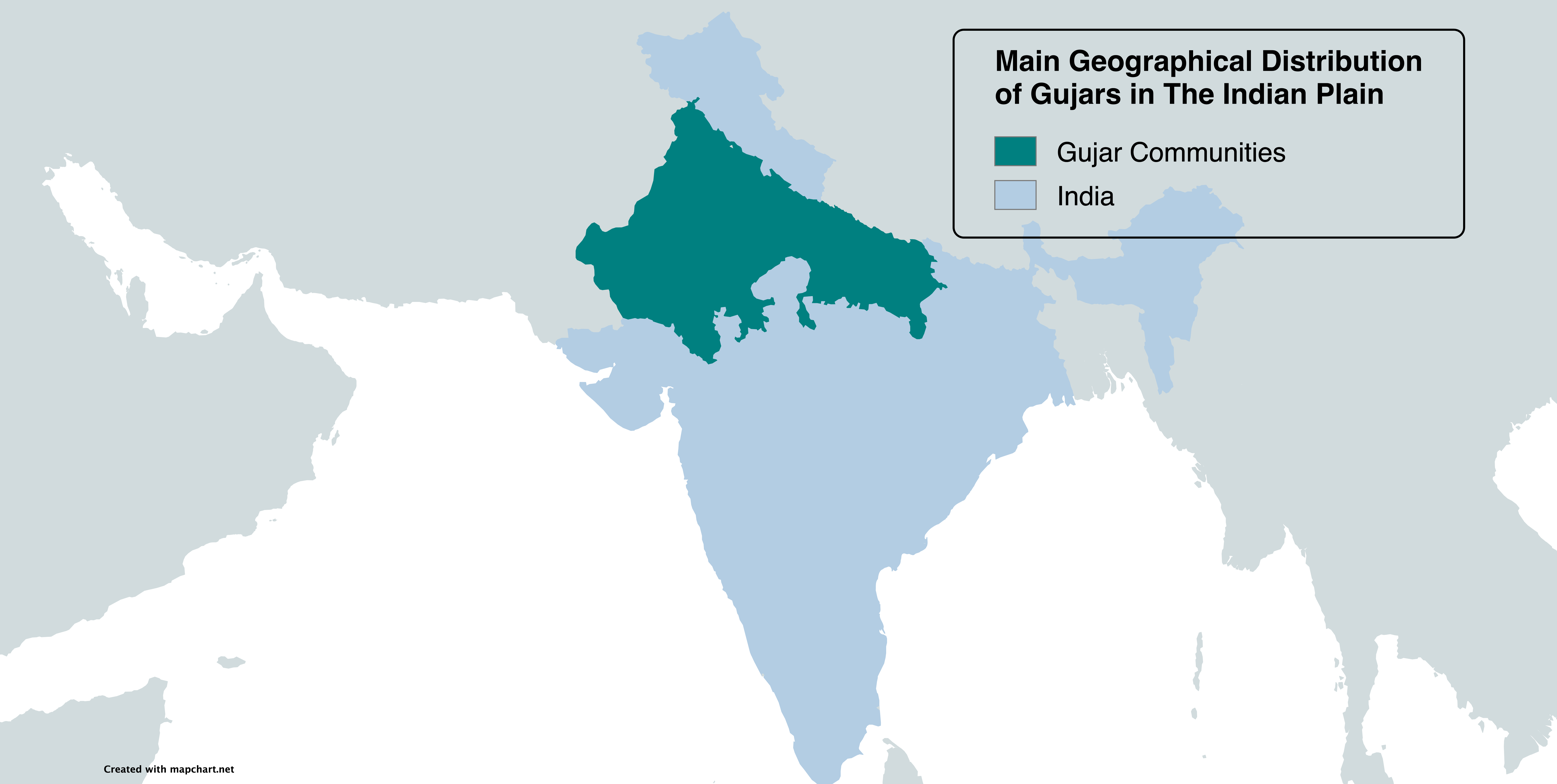
Main geographical distribution of Gujars in The Indian Plain, found in Punjab, Haryana, Dehli, Rajasthan and Uttar Pradesh

In Western Uttar Pradesh Muslim Gujjar are a politically influential community, and they make up a sizeable population among other Muslim communities in the region. They make up a substantial portion of the population in regions like Kairana and Muzaffarnagar, with an estimated 150,000 Muslim Gujjars in the Kairana constituency alone. In the Gangoh Assembly constituency they have a population of 57,000. While in the Amethi constituency assembly their population share is about 60,000.

This community has historically been influential in local politics, often rallying behind candidates from their ethnicity, irrespective of their religious identity. Despite being a minority in the broader context, Muslim Gujjars in these areas hold a demographic and political sway, particularly in rural settings.

In the 1931 census, the total population of Gurjars in Uttar Pradesh (United Provinces of Agra and Oudh) state was 3,59,104, of which 72,302 were Muslims, making up 25.62% of the total Gurjar population.

==== Historical population ====
Population of Muslim Gujjars recorded in different census reports of the British India for United Provinces of Agra and Oudh (present-day Uttar Pradesh).

Historical population
Year	Pop.	±% p.a.
1901	77,384	—
1911	71,503	−0.79%
1921	69,106	−0.34%
1931	72,302	+0.45%
source: 1901 census 1911 census - 1921 census - 1931 census

== Genetics ==
=== India ===
The Genetic studies have revealed that Muslim Gujjars in India are genetically different from Hindu Gujjars of northern India. Furthermore, it has also been found that Hindu Gurjars are genetically closely related to Hindu Jats, Rajputs and Ahirs.

The Muslim Gujjars of the Indian states of the Himalayas are also genetically different from north Indian Hindu communities, including Rajputs, Khatris, and Brahmins of Himachal Pradesh and Pandits of Kashmir.

==== Jammu and Kashmir ====
In Jammu and Kashmir, the predominant haplogroup found among Muslim Gujjars is R1a, occurring at a frequency of 78%. This is followed by haplogroup H, while haplogroup L is found at the lowest frequency.

Haplogroups found among Gujjars of Jammu & Kashmir
1. R1a (78.0%)
2. H (14.0%)
3. L (8.00%)

Recent genetic study shows that Muslim Gujjars in Jammu and Kashmir have genetic similarity with the Pashtuns of Afghanistan and Pakistan and Sindhis.

=== Pakistan ===
==== Khyber Pakhtunkhwa ====
===== Paternal lineages =====
Haplogroups found among Gujjars of Buner & Swabi districts
1. R1a (61.0%)
2. L (21.0%)
3. H (4.84%)
4. J2a (4.82%)
5. R2 (4.03%)
6. J2b (1.61%)
7. Q1a (1.60%)
8. o3-M122 (0.81%)

Research on the NJ tree among Khyber Pakhtunkhwa's ethnic tribes revealed a strong genetic link between the region's Gujjars and Muslim Gujjars in Punjab province. In KPK, they exhibit a high frequency of the R1a haplogroup.

The majority of Muslim Gujjars in Khyber Pakhtunkhwa's districts of Swabi and Buner belong to the R1a haplogroup, with a frequency of 61% and 48% in Swat district, respectively.

Majority of the Gujjars in the districts of Swabi and Buner belong to the haplogroup R1a, with a frequency of 61%; the L haplogroup, 20.97%; H haplogroup, 4.84%; J2a haplogroup, 4.84%; R2 haplogroup, 4.03%; J2b haplogroup, 1.61%; Q1a haplogroup, 1.61%; and O3-M122 haplogroup, 0.81%.

===== Maternal lineages =====
In a 2017 study, the mtDNA of Gujjars of Swabi and Buner districts were found to have high frequency of West Eurasian lineages, about 62.3%, with South Asian lineages being 33.61%, and 4.1% were of East Asian origin.

Haplogroups found among Gujjars of Swat district
1. R1a (48.0%)
2. M33 (45.0%)
3. N5 (7.00%)

In the Swat district, mtDNA haplogroup R had a frequency of 48% among the Gujjars; M haplogroup, 45%; and N haplogroup, 7%.

The study also revealed that the haplogroups found in Gujjars are predominantly 42%; South Asian, 37%; followed by West Eurasian, 2.7%; with smaller positions of Eastern Asian, 1.4% Eastern European, and 1.4%; Northern Asian haplogroups.

Amng the Gujjars of Mansehra, 58.97% belong to mtDNA haplogroup H; 7.69% each for haplogroups M and N1; 5.13% for haplogroup R; and 10.26% belonging to 'others'.

Haplogroups found among Gujjars of Mansehra district
1. H (59.0%)
2. M (7.69%)
3. N1 (7.69%)
4. R (5.13%)
5. 'Others' (10.3%)

==== Punjab ====
In 2019, genetic research indicated that genetically, Gujjars of Punjab are closely related to other Pakistani groups, including the Punjabis, Sindhis, Balochs, Pashtuns, and people of Azad Kashmir.

== Culture ==
Muslim Gujjars adhere to the fundamental principles of Islam, believing in the oneness of Allah and performing the five times daily prayers. They also observe basic Islamic practices including Roza, Zakat, and believe in the day of judgement and the concept of Jannah.

=== Purdah ===
Gujjar women in Punjab, Kashmir, Gilgit-Baltistan and other areas of Pakistan and Northern India typically do not observe the tradition of Purdah or wear Burkas. However, in some areas of Afghanistan and Khyber Pakhtunkhwa, Gujjar women do observe purdah.

=== Attire ===
In various regions of North India, Pakistan and Afghanistan, Muslim Gujjars wear traditional attire similar to that of other local Muslim communities. In Jammu and Kashmir, men from the Gujjar community traditionally wear Shalwar and Kurta, similar to other Kashmiri Muslims. Their women wear a kurta paired with Churidhar pyjama.

=== Child birth ===
In Gujjar communities the birth of a girl child is viewed as a direct blessing from Allah. Gujjar families treat girls and boys equally, and uniquely, they celebrate the birth of a girl child, setting them apart from some Muslim communities. When a child is born in Muslim Gujjar communities, they usually cover the child's face to protect them from the evil eye.

=== Beliefs ===
They follow Islamic laws and are mostly Sunni Muslims by faith. They often visit shrines in various regions of Pakistan, Afghanistan and north India. Including the of Shrine of Hazarat Data Ali Hajveri, Shrine of Baba Farid, Rauza Mandhali Sharif, Chrar-i-Sharief, Pani Pir Shrine, and some other shrines of Gujjar Sufi saints.

==== Sufism ====
The Gujjar culture in Kashmir has stayed traditional for a long time. Many Gujjars adopted Sufism in the medieval era. The Sufis were believed to have special spiritual powers that lasted even after they died. Their shrines were welcoming to everyone. Some Gujjar Sufi disciples became highly spiritual and travelled to other places, sharing their teachings with others.

The Gujjar community is deeply connected to several important shrines including shrine of Baba Sab Larvi, which is dedicated to Pir Muhammad Ubbaidhullah, a Naqshbandiya saint from Bajjar clan of Gujjars and Shrine of Saidu Baba in Saidu Sharif, Swat district from Khatana clan. Shrine of Baba Ghulam Shah Badhshah in Rajouri district which is a popular spot for Gujjars and Bakarwals. Sain-Baba-Miran Baksh located near LOC in Poonch district, which is another important site. The shrines of Farid-Ud-Din Bagdadi and Shah Israr-Uddin Bagdadi in Kishtwar district are also well known amog o Gujjars of Kashmir.

Gujjars enjoy the Punjabi poetry of famous Sufi Saint Mian Muhammad Bakhsh, and Faqar Din, who were both from the Gujjar community. They also appreciate the spiritual writings of Baba Nizam-Ud-Din Larvi, Choudhary Hasan Din, Khuda Baksh Zar and others, which were written in Gujari and Pahari languages. These works have inspired love and respect for Sufism among Gujjars of Punjab and Kashmir in South Asia.

==== Deaths ====
On Thursday evenings, they offer food to their deceased Ancestors. After a death, their family feeds beggars, believing the food reaches the deceased in the afterlife.

=== Language ===
Muslim Gujjars are a multilingual community.

==== Pakistan ====
In Khyber Pakhtunkhwa, they speak Gujari, Hindko, Khowar and Pashto. In Gilgit-Baltistan, they speak Gujari, Balti and Shina. In Azad Kashmir, they speak Gujari, Pahari, and Urdu. They also speak Punjabi and Seraiki in Punjab, Balochi in Balochistan and Sindhi in Sindh.

==== Afghanistan ====
They speak Gujari, Pashto and Dari in Afghanistan.

==== India ====
In north India, they mainly speak Gujari along with regional languages including, Dogri, Pahari, Kangri, Punjabi, Urdu, and Hindi. In 2011 census, the population share of Gujari speakers was 9.5% in Jammu and Kashmir, 0.21% in Himachal Pradesh, 0.03% in Uttarakhand and 0.02% in Indian Punjab. (Note: Gujari mostly spoken by Muslim Gujars. In 2011 census speakers of Gujari in Jammu and Kashmir (9.5%), Himachal Pradesh (0.21%), Uttarakhand (0.03%), & Punjab (0.02%).) Their sub-groups like Van Gujjar, Bakarwal and Dodhi Gujjars speak their own dialects of Gujari language.

=== Family unit ===
Most of Muslim Gujjar families are small consisting of parents and children. When sons get married, they often start their own households, moving out of their parents' home. This usually happens when there are multiple sons, as it is hard for everyone to live together. Traditionally Gujjars lived together in Joint families and looked out for each other. Marriage and family also provide a safe space for couples and protection for all members.

==== Inheritance ====
In Muslim Gujjar families, property and land are usually passed down to the sons after the father dies. Women are entitled to a share of the property under Islamic law, but in practice, they often do not get it. Instead, women typically receive a dowry from their family when they get married.

=== Marriages ===
Muslim Gujjars mostly live in joint families. The divorce rate is low among them, and their divorce system is distinct from other Muslim communities.

==== Rituals ====
Muslim Gujjars have Nikah ceremonies. They also perform a wave ceremony called Parachhan when the bride arrives at her husband's house to ward off evil spirits. In Gujrat district of Punjab, Pakistan they have unique customs similar to Muslim Jats and Hindus.

==== Preparations ====
Muslim Gujjars have their own wedding customs. Before the groom leaves for the wedding, a Mirasi checks the procession and gets gifts. They also give money to Mirasi>s as part of their tradition. Before the wedding, women prepare by grinding grain and decorating homes and items, which starts the wedding preparations.

==== Arrange marriages ====
Arranged marriages are common among Muslim Gujjars, typically taking place with the parents' approval on both the bride's and groom's sides.

==== Gifts ====
When a couple gets married, both families exchange gifts and money. The groom's family gives, the bride's family pays her Haq Mahr and gives her dowry. Relatives and friends also give gifts and money to both families.

==== Endogamy ====
Muslim Gujars practice endogamy, meaning they marry within their own community. They prefer their own clans, but can also marry other Gujars from different clans.

==== Monogamy and Polygamy ====
Most Muslim Gujar men have one wife and stay with her their whole life. The first marriage is a big celebration. However, some men have more than one wife. Sometimes a man may marry again if he doesn't have a son, or for other reasons like revenge or personal desire.

==== Exchange marriages ====
Gujars do not like to exchange marriages, where one family marries their son to a girl from another family in exchange for marrying their daughter to the other family's son.

==== Divorce ====
The divorce rate is low in Muslim Gujjars and parents arrange marriages. If the couple doesn't get along, they might divorce. This can happen if one partner cheats. Sometimes the wife leaves her husband for someone else and gets Khula. After divorce male and females are allowed to remarry according to Islamic law.

=== Jirga (Panchayat) ===
Gujjars in tribal areas of Khyber Pakhtunkhwa, Afghanistan and Jammu and Kashmir follow the Jirga system to resolve everyday issues, including land disputes, political, social, educational, and community-related matters. In June 2018, a Jirga was convened by Gujjars in the Shangla district of Khyber Pakhtunkhwa, where a committee was formed to advocate for their rights to education, healthcare, and transportation in the area. The Jirga also decided to support a candidate in the upcoming elections who would address these issues.

In September 2018, the district government of Torghar district convened a local Jirga to resolve a land dispute between the Gujjars and Akazai Pashtuns in the districts of Torghar and Mansehra. The Gujjars filed a case in the Senior Civil Judge's (SCJ) court, and following the court's order, they were permitted to harvest their wheat and grass crops on the disputed land. Consequently, 90% of the disputed land in Torghar district was granted to the Gujjars after the court's order.

In Jammu and Kashmir Muslim Gujjars and Bakarwals used to have their own councils called Jirga to settle disputes. Many still use this traditional system, but some prefer to go to the police or courts instead. Nowadays, a new system of local government called Panchayat Raj is being used in some areas of Jammu and Kashmir.

== Religion ==
Initially, Gujjars of Pakistan were mostly Sun worshipers; later, most of them converted to Hinduism. The conversation of the Gurjars to Islam began in the 11th century, but the majority adopted Islam during the 16th to 17th centuries under Muslim rule in the Indian subcontinent, largely through the influence of Sufism becoming Sunni Muslims.

=== Conversion to Islam ===
In various regions of north India, Gujjars adopted Islam at different times. Hindu Gujjars of the Lahore district in present-day Punjab, Pakistan embraced Islam in the hands of Muslim saint Hazrat Data-Ali al-Hujwiri in the 11th century.

The Van Gujjars of Uttarakhand, Himachal Pradesh, and Uttar Pradesh adopted Islam in the 13th to 14th centuries.

According to William croocke, many Gujjars in the Awadh region of Uttar Pradesh converted to Islam in the 14th century during the Timur's invasion of north India.

The Gujjars of Himachal Pradesh and Jammu and Kashmir adopted Islam in the 17th century during the rule of Mughal emperor Aurangzeb.

The Gurjars of the Gurdaspur district in Punjab, India also embraced Islam during the rule of Mughal emperor Aurangzeb in the 17th century.

== Clan system ==
Muslim Gujjars are divided into over three hundred eighty (380) clans or Gotras.

Muslim Gurjars have many clans in common with Hindu Gurjars.

=== Sub-groups ===
The Muslim Gujjars also have distinct sub-groups mainly found in the Himalayas such as the Bakarwal, Van Gujjar, Dhodhi Gujjar and Banjara Gujjar.

=== Clans ===
- Khatana
- Chauhan
- Awana
- Kundwana
- Chechi
- Bhadana
- Kushan (Kasana)
- Batar
- Bajjar
- Hakla
- Bhatti
- Rana
- Thikariya
- Noon
- Sangu
- Kataria
- Sood
- Salaria
- Rathore
- Rathe
- Haman
- Gorsi
- Bagri
- Kohli
- Khari
- Padhana
- Dinda
- Dhetra
- Tomar
- Pathan
- Chabra
- Kasani
- Chandel or (Chandela)
- Banja
- Lodhe
- Bhainsi
- Kalas

== Population ==
=== Pakistan ===
In Pakistan Gujjar is considered to be one of the major ethnic group of the country. They make up to 20% of the entire country's population. Their population is estimated at 33 million, and they reside in all provinces of Pakistan including, Gilgit-Baltistan, Azad Kashmir and Islamabad.

=== India ===
In India, 23,59,926 (2.36 million) Muslim Gujjars live mainly in the regions of North India. (Note: Sum of all Muslim Gujars in north India is 2.36 million (Van Gujjar (Note: Van Gujjar's population for Uttarakhand 70,000, for UP, Punjab & Haryana 80,000 and for Himachal Pradesh is 9,784. their total population is 1,59,784.) Bakarwal-Gujjars of Kashmir (Note: In 2011 census, the population of Bakarwals in Jammu and Kashmir was (1,13,198) and Gujjars was (9,80,654). their total population was 10,93,852.) Muslim Gujjars of HP, UP (Note: In Uttar Pradesh's Gangoh (57,000), Kairana (1,50,000) and Amethi (60,000) assembly constituencies total 2,67,000 Muslim Gujjars live. Their population in other areas of UP is not included.) & Haryana).) They are predominantly Muslims, including Van Gujjars of UP, Uttarakhand, HP, Punjab, and Haryana (1,59,784) Bakarwal and Gujjars of Jammu and Kashmir (10,93,852) and, Muslim Gujars of Himachal Pradesh (75,590) and Uttar Pradesh (2,67,000).

Approximately one million Muslim Gujjars live in the districts of Ambala, Nuh, and Hisar in Haryana and Delhi.

==== Population share ====
All Gurjars of Pakistan and Afghanistan are Muslims. In north India, religion-wise the percentage of Muslim Gurjars in the total Gurjar population, in descending order is: 100% for Jammu and Kashmir, 86% for Himachal Pradesh, 66.62% for Punjab, India, 63.21% for Uttarakhand, 34.48% for Haryana, and 25.62% for Uttar Pradesh.

==== British India ====
In 1931 census of the British India there were 10,60,068 (1.06 million) Muslim Gujjars living mainly in Jammu and Kashmir, Punjab, Delhi and North-West Frontier Province (present-day Khyber Pakhtunkhwa province of Pakistan).

=== Afghanistan ===
In Afghanistan, they are mostly found in eastern parts of the country, and their population is estimated at 1.5 million as of 2021.

=== Nepal ===
In Nepal, they belong to a smallest miniority groups, and their population is estimated to be around 700 individuals.

== Politics ==
=== Pakistan ===
Gujjars actively participates in the Politics of Pakistan, especially in the local politics of Punjab, Gilgit-Baltistan, Hazara, Khyber Pakhtunkhwa and Azad Kashmir. In Khyber Pakhtunkhwa in the 1990s, the Syed and Gujjar Communities were in conflict that resulted in sporadic violence between the two communities, which eventually led to the founding of "Gujjarism" - a movement focused on uniting Gujjars. Sardar Mohammad Yusuf began his political career in 1990 by creating the Kisan Mahaz Tenzeem, a coalition of Gujjars formed for the purpose of obtaining independence from the Syed and Swati Landowners to develop the Gujjar Community.

Additionally, as Gujjars became increasingly aware of their strength in numbers to determine election outcomes, they became more politically aware. In 1971, Sardar Abdur Rahman Gujjar's campaign against the Syed leader during the elections was an important indicator of the Gujjar Community's awakening, especially since there had been several elections since that time, and many Gujjars were still unaware of their political power.

In Punjab they follow the ideology kinship of Gujjarism that helps them in building influence in local politics of Punjab. In local politics of Punjab, Gujjars dominate the politics of central, northern (upper) and western regions of Punjab, Pakistan especially in the districts of Gujrat, Gujranwala, Sialkot, Faisalabad, Jhelum, and Rawalpindi, along with Awan, Arain, Raja and Khokhar Punjabi communities.

In 1947, Muslim Gujjar migrants from Jammu established a close relationship with other local Gujjars In Sialkot district of Punjab, Pakistan by developing a common identity that allowed them to create a large political network. Their ability to use their identity as Gujjars has helped them to develop a cooperative community that has what is commonly known as the "Gujjarism". In recent years, Gujjars have demonstrated a remarkable degree of skill in forming alliances that assist them in achieving electoral success. The Gujjars have successfully transformed themselves from an impoverished migrant population to a major player in local politics, largely because of the policies of the State.

Muslim Gujjars have influence in local politics of the Azad Jammu and Kashmir, In 2021 in the State Assembly election of Azad Jammu and Kashmir many Gujjar politicians were elected.

=== India ===
In Jammu and Kashmir, Gujjars make up a significant voting population in 21 assembly constituencies. In the 2014 Jammu and Kashmir Legislative Assembly election, many Gujjars participated and 9 of them were elected as MLAs. This was a notable achievement, especially in Poonch and Rajouri districts where 5 out of 7 elected MLAs were Gujjars. In 2020 in the first District Development Council (DDC) election in Jammu and Kashmir total 38. The 26 members won from Jammu division, and the 15 were tribal women from the community.

Muslim Gujjars are dominant in the local politics of the Uttar Pradesh, especially the Hassan family of Iqra Hassan and Nahid Hasan and Anwar Hasan, who also command a significant vote bank of Muslim Gujjars in the area.

== Social organisation ==
Gujjars in Pakistan and north India have formed various social organizations to fight for their rights, focusing on education, healthcare, culture, language, and development for their community. Such social organisations include: Anjuman-i-Gujjran, Gujjar Youth Forum, Gurjar Desh Charitable Trust, Gujjar United Forum, Gujjar and Bakerwal Youth Forum, Gujjar Qaumi Movement (GQM), and Van Gujjar Tribal Yuva Sangathan.

== In popular culture ==
Muslim Gujjars are part of Punjabi, and Pashto culture and are often portrayed in Pakistani films, Dramas and songs in regional languages of Punjab, Khyber Pakhtunkhwa and Azad Kashmir.

=== Punjabi films ===
- Wehshi Gujjar
- Jagga Tay Shera
- Buddha Gujjar
- Riaz Gujjar
- Badmash Gujjar
- Hamayun Gujjar
- Jeeva Gujjar
- Pappu Gujjar
- Puttar Hamayun Gujjar Da
- Sohna Gujjar

=== Pashto dramas ===
- Gujjar Pa Nasha Ke De
- Gujjar Mama
- Gujjar Tawani De

== Notable people ==
=== Royalty ===
- Mahmud Khan Gujjar, Nawab of Dera Ghazi Khan
- Ruhullah Khan of Poonch, Raja of Sangu dynasty of Poonch
- Abdul Ghafur of Swat, Akhund of Swat

=== Politics ===
- Chaudhri Sultan Ali, 19th-century Gujjar chief
- Chaudhri Rahmat Ali, Pakistan Movement activist, coined the name "Pakistan"
- Fazal Ilahi Chaudhry, 5th President of Pakistan
- Nawabzada Ghazanfar Ali Gul, politician
- Nawabzada Mazhar Ali, politician
- Qamar Zaman Kaira, politician
- Chaudhry Abid Raza, politician
- Iqra Hasan, politician
- Munawwar Hasan, politician
- Nahid Hasan, politician
- Rahmat Ali, Muslim nationalist activist
- Akhtar Ali Vario, politician
- Khush Akhtar Subhani, politician
- Tariq Subhani, politician
- Armaghan Subhani, politician
- Adil Pervaiz Gujjar, politician
- Fazal Ilahi Chaudhry, politician
- Muhammad Jaffar Iqbal, politician
- Tanveer Ashraf Kaira, politician
- Zaka Ashraf, politician
- Abdul Rahim, politician
- Begum Ishrat Ashraf, politician
- Abid Raza, politician
- Gulzar Ahmed, politician
- Maiza Hameed, politician
- Sajjad Haider, politician
- Muhammad Iqbal, politician
- Sardar Muhammad Yousuf, politician
- Aslam Chowdhary Mohammad, politician
- Mohammad Aslam Kohli, politician
- Rafaqat Hussain Gujjar, politician
- Shafiq Ahmad Gujjar, politician
- Sahibzada Muhammad Ishaq Zaffar, politician
- Razia Sultana, politician
- Mian Altaf Ahmed Larvi, politician
- Malik Abrar Ahmad, politician
- Fayyaz Ul Hassan Chohan, politician
- Amir Hussain, politician
- Muhammad Akhlaq, politician
- Jaffar Iqbal Gujjar, politician
- Zeb Jaffar, politician
- Muhammad Omar Jaffar, politician
- Nadeem Khadim, politician
- Muhammad Iqbal Gujjar, politician
- Fanoos Gujjar, politician

=== Military ===
- Fazal Din, Indian recipient of the Victoria Cross award
- Major Tufail Mohammad, Nishan-e-Haider recipient
- Air Marshal Abdul Rahim Khan, Commander-in-Chief of the Pakistan Air Force (1969-1972)
- General Sawar Khan, Pakistan Army Vice Chief of Army Staff (1980-1984)
- Shahid Iqbal, Officer from Jammu and Kashmir cadre

=== Religion ===
- Faizul Waheed, was an Indian Islamic scholar, jurist and an exegete of the Quran from Jammu and Kashmir
- Hafiz Saeed
- Mian Bashir Ahmed, was a Sufi saint and tribal leader from Indian-adminsntrated Kashmir

=== Literature ===
- Ahmad Gujjar, 17th-century poet
- Afarin Lahori, 18th-century poet
- Mian Muhammad Bakhsh, 19th-century poet
- Ghulam Rasool Alampuri 19th-century Punjabi Muslim Sufi poet and author
- Abdul Ghani Azhari, was head-professor of the University of Kashmir's Arabic department
- Javaid Rahi, Kashmiri Gujjar author and linguist

=== Sports ===
- Shoaib Akhtar, international cricketer
- Mohammad Asif, international cricketer
- Abdullah Shafique, international cricketer
- Wahab Riaz, international cricketer
- Anwar Ali, international cricketer

=== Entertainment ===
- Adeel Chaudhry, actor

=== Journalism ===
- Javed Chaudhry, Pakistani columnist and journalist

=== Business ===
- Shabbir Ahmad, Pakistani politician and Businessman

== See also ==
- Punjabi Muslims
- Kashmiri Muslims
