= Chaudhry Abdul Rahim =

Pakistani and British Raj politician

Abdul Rahim Chaudhry was a Pakistani and British Raj politician who played a prominent role in the Pakistan Movement. He also served as a member of the first Legislative Assembly of Punjab, and a member of the Provincial Assembly of Punjab.

== Early life ==
Chaudhry was born in a Punjabi family of Muslim Gujjars in the town Maingri of Narowal District in the British Punjab.

== Political career ==
Chaudhry was a member of the First Punjab Legislative Assembly from April 5, 1937, to March 19, 1945. He served in the Second Punjab Legislative Assembly from May 7, 1951, to October 14, 1955. Chaudhry also served in the Provincial Assembly of West Pakistan Fifth Assembly from June 9, 1962, to June 8, 1965.

Chaudhry was given the title of Khan Bahadur under the British Rule.

== Descendants ==
Chaudhry's son Chaudhry Idrees Taj was a member of Majlis-e-Shura in Zia-ul-Haq Cabinet, while his other son Chaudhry Ishfaq Taj remained a member of the National Assembly NA-91 for two terms first from 1990 to 1993, then 1993-1997.

Saqib Idrees Taj, son of Chaudhry Idrees Taj and grandson of Chaudhry Abdul Rahim, is a politician and holds a position in the Central Executive Committee of Pakistan Tehreek-e-Insaf.
