= History of the Pakistan Super League =

Overview of Pakistan Super League

Pakistan Super League (PSL) is the highest level of domestic Twenty20 cricket in Pakistan. The league is owned by the Pakistan Cricket Board and its first season was played in 2016. The league, when it started, included five teams: Karachi Kings, Quetta Gladiators, Peshawar Zalmi, Islamabad United, and Lahore Qalandars. The third season of the league in 2018 saw the inclusion of Multan Sultans as the sixth team to compete in the tournament. The league has been organized every year since its first season and all the teams have won the trophy at least once. The first season of the PSL was won by Islamabad United, who were captained by Misbah ul Haq, who was also the captain of the Pakistan national cricket team at that time. Lahore Qalandars are the current champions of the PSL.

== Establishment and launch ==
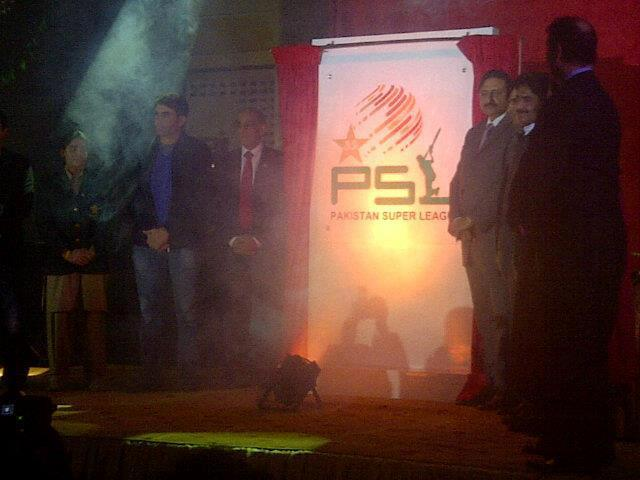
Misbah-ul-Haq and then chairman PCB Zaka Ashraf during first launch of PSL in 2013

The PCB had announced the launch of the first season of the PSL in 2013 during Zaka Ashraf's tenure as chairman, but the idea was postponed in 2014 due to logistical problems, and in 2015 due to paucity of lead time. The first season which was supposed to be played between December 2014 and January 2015 failed to go through because out of the six companies that showed interest in investing only two managed to produce a bank guarantee of more than $3 million. By mid 2015, the interest from sponsors and investors in the PSL was adequate enough to formally launch the league. At that time, Najam Sethi was the executive committee chief of the PCB and his efforts are highly regarded in Pakistan for his efforts in making the PSL a reality after two years of speculation.

== Season by season overview of the PSL ==
=== 2016 season ===
The year 2016 marked the launch of the inaugural season of the Pakistan Super League. The season was played in the UAE due to the ban on cricket in Pakistan that was imposed after the attack on the Sri Lankan cricket team in 2009. The season featured five teams namely Islamabad United, Karachi Kings, Quetta Gladiators, Peshawar Zalmi, and Lahore Qalandars. The tournament's inaugural ceremony was hosted by Yasir Hussain and Sri Lankan model Stephanie Siriwardhana. It featured both local and international celebrities including Ali Zafar, Sean Paul, Mohib Mirza, and others.

The first match was played on 4 February 2016 at the Dubai International Cricket Stadium between Quetta Gladiators, captained by Sarfaraz Ahmed and Islamabad United, captained by Misbah ul Haq. The Gladiators won the opening match by 8 wickets with Muhammad Nawaz being the man of the match for picking up four wickets and scoring an unbeaten 22 runs. Coincidentally, the same teams played the final match of the tournament too. The match was held on 23 February 2016 at the Dubai International Cricket Stadium. The final was won by Islamabad United who were crowned the first ever champions of the franchise winning by six wickets with West Indies' Dwayne Smith being the stand out performer for his 73 runs off 51 balls.

Ravi Bopara was named the man of the series for scoring 329 runs and getting 11 wickets throughout the tournament.

=== 2017 season ===
The second season of the PSL kicked off on 9 February 2017, but prior to the beginning of the tournament the PCB unveiled its new trophy. The trophy was named the Spirit Trophy and was made from more than 50,000 crystal fine rocks from Swarovski. It was unveiled at the Dubai International Cricket Stadium with captains of the five franchises alongside Najam Sethi, Rameez Raja, and Andrew Mojica.

The opening ceremony of the season was hosted by Fahad Mustafa and featured performances from Ali Zafar, Shehzad Roy, and Jamaican rapper Shaggy. The season's official anthem Ab Khel Jame Ga by Ali Zafar remains to be the most popular anthem to date.

The first match of the tournament was played between Peshawar Zalmi and defending champions Islamabad United. The match was decided by the Duckworth–Lewis method which saw Islamabad win the game with seven wickets and two balls remaining. Brad Haddin of Islamabad was named player of the match for scoring 73 runs. The final of the 2017 season was played in Lahore at the Gaddafi Stadium as the cricket board tried to revive cricket in Pakistan. While many of the foreign stars decided against coming to Pakistan, the final still managed to sell out the stadium. The match was played between Peshawar Zalmi and Quetta Gladiators led by Darren Sammy and Sarfaraz Ahmed, respectively. The match saw Peshawar batting first and scoring 148 runs and grabbing a 58 run victory over Quetta, making the final one-sided as dubbed by the media. Sammy was awarded the man of the match while Peshawar's Kamran Akmal grabbed the player of the series award for accumulating 353 runs throughout the tournament.

=== 2018 season ===
The third season of the PSL brought about a lot of progress for the league. A sixth team named Multan Sultans was introduced by then PCB chairman, Najam Sethi. The season also marked a major step in the revival of cricket in Pakistan as the final three games of the tournament were played in the country. The board managed to bring the two eliminators to Lahore with the final being played in Karachi - the first major international game in the city since the attack on the Sri Lankan team in 2009.

The opening ceremony of the tournament, like the previous two seasons was held in Dubai on 1 February 2018. It was hosted by Hareem Fatima, Bilal Ashraf, and Rameez Raja with performances from Abida Parveen, Shehzad Roy, Ali Zafar, and American musician Jason Durelo. The season's anthem Dil Se Jaan Laga De was sung by Ali Zafar - the third time in a row that the singer was given the opportunity to sing the tournament's official anthem.

The first eliminator that was played in Lahore on 20 March 2018 was contested by Peshawar Zalmi and Quetta Gladiators. As was the case in the last season, many key players decided against coming to Pakistan and the hit was felt more by the Gladiators than the Zalmis as Kevin Pieterson, Shane Watson, and Ben Laughlin all refused to participate. Even though the match was affected by rain, no overs were cut short. Quetta, who won the toss had elected to field first and were given a target of 158 runs. In response, Quetta amassed 157 runs and lost by a single run. Liam Dawson was awarded the man of the match for his 62 runs.

The second eliminator that was also played in Lahore had a lot of highlights, but the most notable of them was when a helicopter belonging to the Pakistan Army was used to dry the ground and make it playable after heavy rain. The match was played between Karachi Kings and Peshawar Zalmi. The match saw Zalmi batting first and scoring 170 runs which the Kings failed to chase down and could manage a total of 157 in reply. This win gave Peshawar the chance to become the first team to defend the PSL title.

The final was played between the champions of the first edition, Islamabad United led by Misbah ul Haq and the current champions Peshawar Zalmi led by Darren Sammy at the National Stadium in Karachi on 25 March 2018. The game was played under heavy security with a reported 8,000 men being deployed to ensure safety in the city as it hosted the final. The match saw Zalmi batting first and scoring 148 runs which was chased down by United in less than 17 overs with a man of the match performance from Luke Ronchi who scored 52 runs. Ronchi also won the man of the series award for his 435 runs throughout the tournament.

=== 2019 season ===
The fourth season of the PSL was announced in September 2018. The PCB announced that while the tournament would begin in the UAE, eight games were played in Pakistan. It was announced that these matches would be played in both Karachi and Lahore with Lahore hosting three games and Karachi hosting five games including the final.

As with all previous years, the opening ceremony was held in the Dubai International Cricket Stadium on 14 February 2019. The ceremony was hosted by Ramiz Raja and featured performances from Boney M, Pakistani rock band Junoon, Aima Baig, and the creators of the PSL's official anthem for the 2019 season Shuja Haider, Fawad Khan and Young Desi. American musician Pitbull was also supposed to be among the list of celebrities to perform at the ceremony but had to cancel due to reported technical issues with his flight to Dubai.

The first 26 games of the tournament were played as announced in the UAE and the tournament then came to Pakistan for its completion. There was a change of plans among rising security concerns and all eight games were shifted to Karachi. There were strict security protocols enforced throughout the city as stars including Shane Watson, Darren Sammy, Kieran Pollard and others had all decided to come to Pakistan to complete the tournament. A reported 13,000 policemen and 2,500 armed paramilitary personnel were deployed to provide security to the players.

The tournament kicked off with defending champions Islamabad United winning against Lahore Qalandars after a special innings from Asif Ali. The final of the tournament was played between Quetta Gladiators and Peshawar Zalmi. The ceremony before the final was cancelled in solidarity with the Christchurch attack in New Zealand. The closing ceremony lineup included super hit performances by Junoon, Fawad Khan, Shuja Haider, Aima Baig, Young Desi, and Abrar ul Haq.

Gladiators, who were playing the final for a record third time won the tournament after they chased down Zalmi's total of 138 runs with eight wickets to spare. Quetta's Mohammad Hasnain was awarded the man of the match award for taking three wickets in the match. Shane Watson was awarded the player of the tournament award for his 430 runs scored in twelve matches throughout the tournament.

=== 2020 season ===
The fifth edition of the PSL was the first season with all matches to be played in Pakistan. PCB chairman Ehsan Mani announced in June 2018 that all matches of the league would be played in the home country. It was announced that Karachi, Lahore, Multan, and Rawalpindi would host all games. The tournament was cut short and postponed indefinitely due to the coronavirus pandemic before the semi-finals. The foreign players were all sent back to mitigate the risk of spread of the virus after a few games were played behind closed doors without an audience.

== Revenues ==
According to estimates, PCB generates more than 2.56 billion Pakistani rupees annually from the tournament. Out of this 60% is generated through sponsorship from both local and multinational companies that have partnered with the PCB to execute the event. The total revenue generated from the PSL is divided between the franchises and the cricket board. 70% of the revenue goes to the PCB while the remaining 30% is distributed among the six franchises. Apart from the shared revenue, the franchises also have their own sets of sponsors who are responsible for the franchise's earnings. Sales of merchandise also make up a significant chunk of the revenues for all franchises. The PCB officially announced revenues of $2.6 million after the first season. In July 2018, the PCB announced the brand value of the PSL to be at $230 million as calculated by Paris-based media conglomerate Lagardere Sports and New York-based firm Nielsen Corporation.

=== Commercial rights ===
In December 2015, the commercial rights for the initial five franchises were sold for $93 million. The contract is valid for ten years.

== Controversies ==
In 2017, batsman Sharjeel Khan alongside Khalid Latif and Nasir Jamshed were found guilty of spot fixing and were banned from taking part in the competition. Khan was initially handed a five-year ban which was then eased down to two and a half years as he made his comeback in 2020 edition of the tournament.

During a match in the fifth edition of the PSL between Zalmi and Kings, a team official of the Karachi Kings side was spotted using a mobile phone. The event was captured on camera and the person was identified as Tariq Wasi who was reportedly the team's manager while the team sheet submitted before the match listed Navaid Rasheed as the manager. The ICC strictly prohibits the use of mobile phones in the dug out and the dressing rooms and this was a strict violation of the International Cricket Council's Code of Conduct. The ICC, however did not comment on the matter as a spokesperson claimed that it was outside their jurisdiction and that the PCB is responsible to cater domestic issues.

A report in March 2020 stated that the PCB had partnered with betting companies. Betting is a punishable offence in Pakistan because of which this issue has caught significant media attention. The board has claimed that the betting agreements were made by the league's commercial partners for international fans in England and other countries where betting is legal.

== See also ==
- List of Pakistan Super League records and statistics
- List of Pakistan Super League cricketers
- List of Pakistan Super League centuries
- List of Pakistan Super League anthems
