= Muhammad Omar Jaffar =

Pakistani politician

Chaudhry Muhammad Omar Jaffar

Member of the Provincial Assembly of the Punjab
- In office 29 May 2013 – 31 May 2018

Personal details
- Born: 13 August 1982 (age 44) Rahim Yar Khan
- Party: PMLN
- Parent(s): Chaudhry Jaffar Iqbal Gujjar (father); Begum Ishrat Ashraf (mother)
- Relatives: Zaib Jaffar (sister); Maiza Hameed (cousin); Zaka Ashraf (uncle)

Chaudhry Muhammad Omar Jaffar is a Pakistani politician who was a Member of the Provincial Assembly of the Punjab, from May 2013 to May 2018.

== Early life and education ==
He was born on 13 August 1982 in Rahim Yar Khan to a landlord family. His father Chaudhry Jaffar Iqbal Gujjar is a former Deputy Speaker of the National Assembly and his mother Begum Ishrat Ashraf is a former member of the National Assembly of Pakistan. His sister Zaib Jaffar is also a politician and a member of the Provincial Assembly of the Punjab.

He completed the General Certificate of Secondary Education in 1999 from St Lawrence College, Ramsgate and received a degree of Bachelor of Arts (Hons) in Business Economics and Finance in 2008 from London Metropolitan University.

== Political career ==
He was elected to the Provincial Assembly of the Punjab as a candidate of Pakistan Muslim League (Nawaz) from Constituency PP-293 (Rahimyar Khan-IX) in the 2013 Pakistani general election.
