= Zeb Jaffar =

Pakistani politician

Member of the National Assembly of Pakistan
- In office 13 August 2018 – 10 August 2023
- Constituency: Reserved seat for women
- In office 1 June 2013 – 31 May 2018
- Constituency: Reserved seat for women

Personal details
- Born: Faisalabad, Punjab, Pakistan
- Party: PMLN (2013-present)
- Parent(s): Chaudhry Jaffar Iqbal Gujjar (father); Begum Ishrat Ashraf (mother)
- Relatives: Chaudhry Muhammad Omar Jaffar (brother); Maiza Hameed (cousin); Zaka Ashraf (uncle)

Zeb Jaffar (Punjabi, Urdu: زیب جعفر) is a Pakistani politician who had been a member of the National Assembly of Pakistan from August 2018 till August 2023. Previously she was a member of the National Assembly from June 2013 to May 2018.

== Early life and education ==
She was born in Hyderabad, Pakistan to Begum Ishrat Ashraf and Chaudhry Jaffar Iqbal.

She received her early education at the Convent of Jesus and Mary, Murree before graduating from Kinnaird College, Lahore in 2001.

She received her M.A. degree in International Relations from Middlesex University, London in 2005.

== Political career ==
She began her political career in 1997 after getting elected as Vice Chairperson, District Council, Rahim Yar Khan.

She ran for the seat of the National Assembly of Pakistan as a candidate of Pakistan Muslim League (N) (PML-N) from Constituency NA-193 (Rahim Yar Khan-II) in the 2002 Pakistani general election but was unsuccessful. She received 23,004 votes and lost the seat to Syed Tanveer Hussain Syed, a candidate of Pakistan Peoples Party (PPP).

She ran for the seat of the National Assembly as a candidate of PML-N from Constituency NA-193 (Rahim Yar Khan-II) and as an independent candidate from Constituency NA-196 (Rahim Yar Khan-V) in the 2008 Pakistani general election but was unsuccessful. She received 24,831 votes from Constituency NA-193 (Rahim Yar Khan-II) and lost the seat to Mian Abdul Sattar, and received 363 votes from Constituency NA-196 (Rahim Yar Khan-V) and lost the seat to Javed Iqbal Warraich. In the same election, she ran for the seat of the Provincial Assembly of Punjab as an independent candidate from Constituency PP-293 (Rahimyar Khan-IX) but was unsuccessful. She received 206 votes and lost the seat to Javid Akbar Dhilloon, a candidate of PPP. In the same election, she was elected to the Provincial Assembly of Punjab as a candidate of PML-N on a reserved seats for women.

She was elected to the National Assembly as a candidate of PML-N on a reserved seats for women from Punjab in the 2013 Pakistani general election.

She was re-elected to the National Assembly as a candidate of PML-N on a seat reserved for women from Punjab in the 2018 Pakistani general election.
