= Khichi =

Khichi may refer to:

- The Khichi subclan of the Chauhan Rajputs
- Aurangzeb Khan Khichi, Pakistani politician
- Haji Muhammed Aslam Khan Khichi, Pakistani politician
