= Shafqat Mahmood =

Pakistani politician

- شفقت محمود
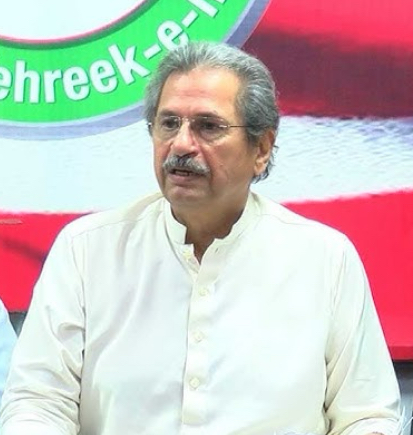

Minister for Federal Education and Professional Training
- In office 20 August 2018 – 10 April 2022
- President: Mamnoon Hussain; Arif Alvi
- Prime Minister: Imran Khan
- Preceded by: Muhammad Yusuf Shaikh (caretaker)

Minister for National History and Literary Heritage
- In office 20 August 2018 – 10 April 2022
- President: Mamnoon Hussain; Arif Alvi
- Prime Minister: Imran Khan
- Preceded by: Syed Ali Zafar (caretaker)

Member of the National Assembly of Pakistan
- In office 13 August 2018 – 17 January 2023
- Constituency: NA-130 Lahore-VIII
- In office 1 June 2013 – 31 May 2018
- Constituency: NA-126 Lahore-IX

Personal details
- Born: 19 February 1950 (age 76) Lahore, Punjab, Pakistan
- Other political affiliations: PTI (2011-2024); PPP (1990-2007)
- Children: Tara Mahmood (daughter)
- Relatives: Zaka Ashraf (cousin); Chaudhry Jaffar Iqbal Gujjar (cousin)
- Education: Sadiq Public School

Shafqat Mahmood (Punjabi, Urdu: شفقت محمود; 19 February 1950) is a retired Pakistani bureaucrat-turned-politician who served as the Federal Minister for Federal Education and Professional Training, and Federal Minister for National History and Literary Heritage, from 20 August 2018 to 3 April 2022. Before going into politics, he served as a grade 20 officer of the Pakistan Administrative Service.

He was elected a member of the National Assembly of Pakistan in 2013 and 2018. He has been a member of the Senate of Pakistan from March 1994 to March 2000. He served as Federal Minister for the Ministry of Food, Agriculture and Livestock, the Ministry of Environment, Urban Affair Forestry and Wildlife, and the Ministry of Local Government and Rural Development in the federal cabinet of Prime Minister Malik Meraj Khalid from November 1996 to February 1997. He served as Provincial Minister of Punjab for Information from 1999 to 2000 during the military rule of Pervez Musharraf. He is no longer Member of the National Assembly as he resigned from the National Assembly.

== Early life and education ==
He was born on 19 February 1950. Belonging to a Gujjar family, his cousins include Zaka Ashraf, associated with the PPP and who also served as the PCB chairman, as well Chaudhry Jaffar Iqbal Gujjar, a senior PML-N politician.

He completed his early education at Sadiq Public School, Bahawalpur, and later studied in the Government College University, Lahore before completing his master's degree in Psychology from University of the Punjab in 1970. He received a master's degree in Public Administration from Harvard University in 1981. He also obtained a master's degree in Public Policy and Administration from the University of Southern California in 1987. He has also cleared the Central Superior Service (CSS) exams.

His daughter Tara Mahmood is an actress and singer.

== Early career ==
He started his career by joining the Pakistan Administrative Service cadre of the civil bureaucracy in 1973. He served as Assistant Commissioner of Murree and Pakpatan from 1975 to 1978. He was then made Deputy Secretary to the Government of the Punjab where he served till 1980. He served as Deputy Commissioner of Gujranwala and Dera Ghazi Khan for five years and also as an Additional Commissioner of the Afghan Refugees Organization for a short time in 1985. He served as Additional Secretary of Finance of the Government of Punjab from 1988 to 1989. Later, he joined the Prime Minister's Secretariat and served as Joint Secretary from 1989 to 1990.

== Political career ==
He left the civil service and joined the Pakistan Peoples Party (PPP) in 1990 to begin his political career. He was appointed as political secretary to then Prime Minister of Pakistan Benazir Bhutto and remained spokesperson for PPP to represent the party on foreign tours. He remained a close aide of Benazir Bhutto.

He was elected to the Senate of Pakistan as a candidate of PPP from Islamabad in March 1994. He remained a member of the Senate until March 2000.

On 5 November 1996, he was inducted into the federal cabinet of caretaker Prime Minister Malik Meraj Khalid and was appointed as Federal Minister for Food, Agriculture and Livestock. On 12 November, he was given the additional ministerial portfolio of Ministry of Environment, Urban Affair Forestry and Wildlife. On 25 November, he was given the additional ministerial portfolio of Ministry of Environment, Local Government and Rural Development. He served as Minister for Food, Agriculture and Livestock until 15 December 1996. He remained Minister for Environment, Urban Affair Forestry and Wildlife, and Minister for Environment, Local Government and Rural Development until 17 February 1997.

He became part of the military government setup following the 1999 Pakistani coup d'état and served as Provincial Minister of Punjab for Information from 1999 to 2000. After his resignation, he began writing columns for an English-language newspaper The News International and used to criticize the Pakistan Tehreek-e-Insaf (PTI) and its chief Imran Khan.

He joined PTI in November 2011 and served as information secretary of PTI from December 2011 to March 2013.

He was elected to the National Assembly of Pakistan from Constituency NA-126 (Lahore-IX) as a candidate of PTI in the 2013 Pakistani general election. He received 97,933 votes and defeated Khawaja Ahmad Hassan, a candidate of the Pakistan Muslim League (N) (PML-N).

In November 2015, he resigned from the post of PTI organizer in Lahore after the party's poor performance in local government elections held in October 2015. In May 2017, he became central information secretary of PTI.

He was re-elected to the National Assembly as a candidate of PTI from Constituency NA-130 (Lahore-VIII) in the 2018 Pakistani general election.

On 18 August, Imran Khan formally announced his federal cabinet structure and Mahmood was named as Minister for Federal Education and Professional Training and Minister for National History and Literary Heritage. On 20 August 2018, he was sworn in as a Federal Minister in the federal cabinet of Prime Minister Imran Khan.

On 15 November 2019, he was elected as the President of UNESCO's Education Commission.

== Writings ==
He has written numerous articles as well government reports, including Devolving the State: A Model for Empowering the People in 2000.
