= Begum Ishrat Ashraf =

Pakistani politician

Member of the Provincial Assembly of Punjab
- In office 15 August 2018 – 14 January 2023
- Constituency: Reserved seat for women

Member of the National Assembly of Pakistan
- In office 17 March 2008 – 16 March 2013
- Constituency: Reserved seat for women
- In office 16 November 2002 – 15 November 2007
- Constituency: Reserved seat for women
- In office 20 March 1985 – 29 May 1988
- Constituency: Reserved seat for women

Personal details
- Party: PMLN (2002-present)
- Spouse: Chaudhry Jaffar Iqbal Gujjar
- Children: Zaib Jaffar (daughter); Chaudhry Muhammad Omar Jaffar (son)
- Relatives: Zaka Ashraf (brother)

Begum Ishrat Ashraf is a Pakistani politician who has been a member of the National Assembly of Pakistan between 1985 and 2013.

== Family ==
Ashraf is married to Chaudhry Jaffar Iqbal Gujjar and has a daughter Zaib Jaffar and a son Chaudhry Muhammad Omar Jaffar. She is the sister of Zaka Ashraf.

== Political career ==
She was elected to the National Assembly of Pakistan on a seat reserved for women from Punjab in the 1985 Pakistani general election.

She was re-elected to the National Assembly of Pakistan as a candidate of Pakistan Muslim League (N) (PML-N) on a seat reserved for women from Punjab in the 2002 Pakistani general election. In February 2006, she was elected president of PML-N women wing. In June 2006, she became a member of the National Public Safety Commission.

In 2011, she was named among the MPs who had foreign accounts and assets outside Pakistan.

She was re-elected to the National Assembly as a candidate of PML-N on a seat reserved for women from Punjab in the 2008 Pakistani general election.

She was elected to the Provincial Assembly of the Punjab as a candidate of PML-N on a reserved seat for women in the 2018 Pakistani general election.
