= Sadiq Public School =

School in Bahawalpur, Punjab, Pakistan

- Al-Maktoum Library in 1999
- Bahawalpur, Punjab; Pakistan

Information
- Motto: Do the right, Fear no man
- Established: 4 March 1953
- Founder: Nawab of Bahawalpur, Sir Sadiq Muhammad Khan Abbasi V
- Principal: Mian Muhammad Ahmed (Acting)
- Area: 1.83 square kilometres (451 acres)
- Student Union/Association: Old Sadiqian's Association
- Website: sadiqpublicschool.com

The Sadiq Public School (SPS) is a college-preparatory boarding school located in Bahawalpur, Punjab, Pakistan. It also takes day pupils. Its area of 1.83 square kilometres (451 acres) makes it both the largest school in the country and in continental Asia.

The curriculum includes education from KG to O-level and A-level as well as local board Matriculation/Intermediate. The school has over 1400 boys and 600 girls supported by a staff of about 135.

The foundation stone of the school was laid by Nawab Sadeq Mohammad Khan V on 4 March 1953 and the school started functioning on 18 January 1954.

== Notable alumni ==
The school's emblem

Notable alumni include:

- Moazzam Jah Ansari, PSP (HI, QPM, UNPM), Former Inspector General of Police
- Haji Muhammed Aslam Khan Khichi
- Makhdoom Shahabuddin
- Muhammad Mian Soomro, former president, prime minister and chairman of Senate of Pakistan and former governor of Sindh
- Jehangir Khan Tareen, former federal minister for industries and production
- Tariq Bashir Cheema, former federal minister for housing
- Zaka Ashraf, former chairman Pakistan Cricket Board
- Salahuddin Quader Chowdhury, former minister, Bangladesh
- Siddiq Khan Kanju, former minister of state for foreign affairs (Pakistan)
- Syed Ali Raza, former chairman and president National Bank of Pakistan
- Ishaq Khan Khakwani, former state minister for railways
- Waqar Younis, former captain Pakistan Cricket Team
- Rameez Raja, cricket commentator, former batsman of Pakistan Cricket Team, former chairman of Pakistan Cricket Board
- Makhdoom Altaf Ahmed Hashmi Late, former senior minister Provincial Assembly of the Punjab
- Shafqat Mahmood, federal minister
- Riaz Hussain Pirzada, federal minister

== See also ==
- Lawrence College Ghora Gali
