= Makhdoom Altaf Ahmed =

Pakistani politician

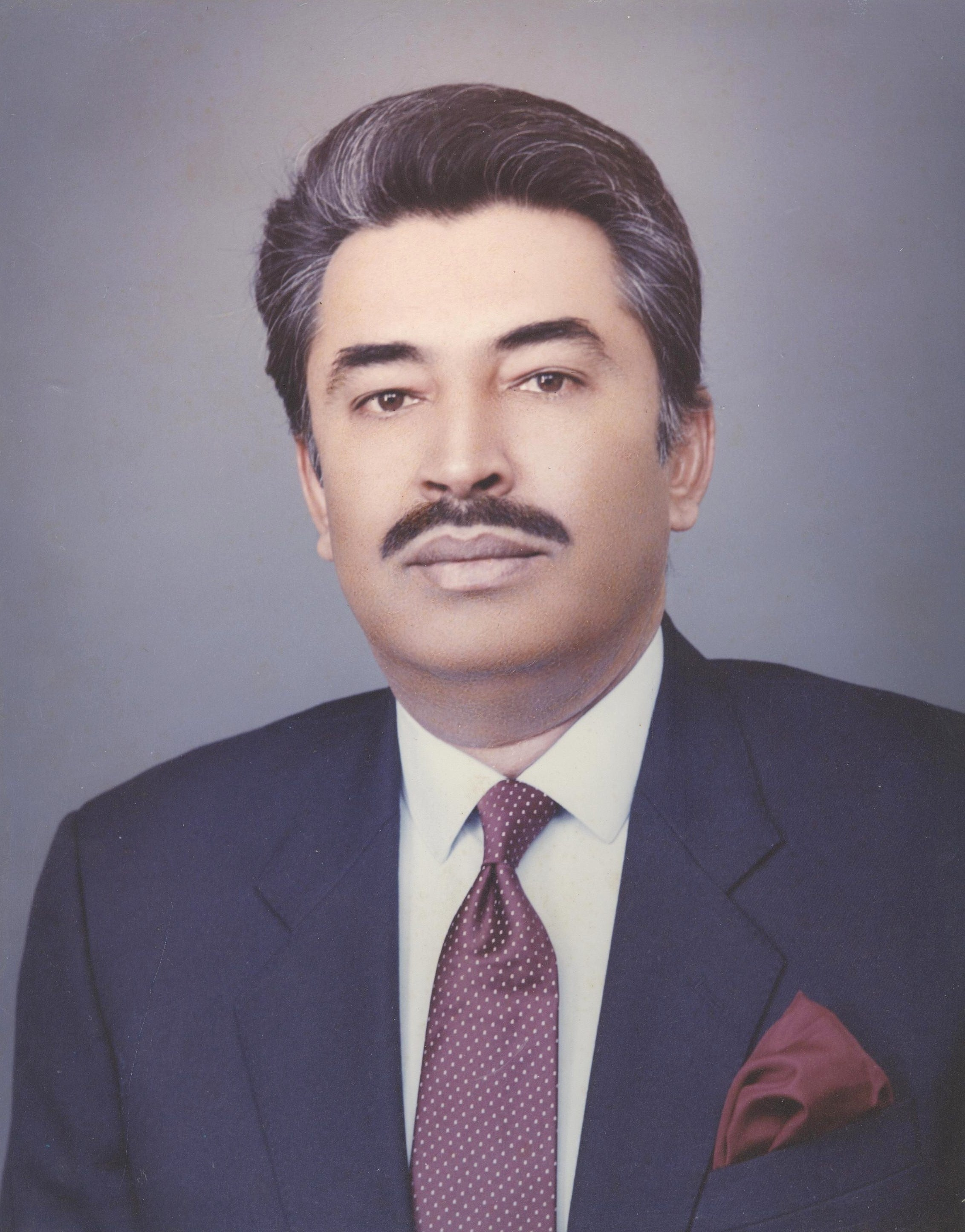
Makhdoom Altaf Ahmed

Makhdoom Altaf Ahmad (1 October 1944 – 1 October 1995) was a Pakistani politician. Ahmed was born in Mianwali Qureshian, Rahim Yar Khan District, Punjab, Pakistan. He attended the Sadiq Public School and Forman Christian College. He obtained his law degree from Punjab Law College.

== Political career ==
=== 1985-1988 ===
He was first elected to the Provincial Assembly of the Punjab in 1985 and served as the provincial minister for Finance with the additional charge of Excise and Taxation. However, midway in 1986 he developed serious differences with the then Chief Minister of Punjab Nawaz Sharif. As a result, he along with a few other members of the cabinet including the future Chief Minister Chaudhry Pervaiz Elahi resigned from the posts and announced their intention to remove Nawaz Sharif from the office of Chief Minister through a vote of no-confidence. However, due to Nawaz Sharif being the protege of and enjoying the complete support of Gen. Zia-ul-Haq, who subsequently intervened in this matter, all the rebellious ministers, with the exception of Makhdoom Altaf Ahmed, withdrew their resignations and reconciled with Nawaz Sharif. Makhdoom Altaf spent the remainder of the tenure of the Provincial Assembly until 1988 as an ordinary member of the Assembly, though he continued voicing his opposition to Nawaz Sharif's policies.

=== 1988-1990 ===
He served a second term in the Punjab Assembly from 1988 to 1990.

=== 1993-1995 ===
His third term in the Provincial Assembly starting in 1993 saw him elevated to the post of Senior Minister and Parliamentary Leader of the PPP in the coalition government. He died in 1995 while still in office.

Makhdoom Altaf Ahmed was known to be a man of honesty and integrity in an era rife with corruption.
