= Asqalan, Afghanistan =

Asqalan
- Village
- Location in Afghanistan
- Coordinates: 36°50′40″N 68°44′42″E
- Country: Afghanistan
- Province: Kunduz Province
- District: Kunduz District
- Time zone: + 4.30

Asqalan or Askalan is a village in Kunduz Province, in northern Afghanistan. It lies roughly 20 kilometres northwest of Kunduz and is also an archaeological site of an ancient tomb.

The Khanabad River lies to the south of the village and to the north is a vast open desert. The Asqalan diversionary dam and public canal has been reconstructed to supply sufficient water to the Asqalan and Minfareq canals for irrigation in the area. South of the village along the river bank, is a terraced farmland, also known as the Khanabad Plain.

== See also ==
- Kunduz Province
