= Maingri =

- Union Council
- Location within Pakistan
- Coordinates: 32°12′N 75°8′E
- Country: Pakistan
- Province: Punjab
- District: Narowal District
- Tehsil: Shakargarh Tehsil
- Elevation: 243 m (797 ft)
- Time zone: UTC+5 (PST)

Maingri is a Union Council in Shakargarh Tehsil of Narowal District in the Punjab province of Pakistan, it is located at an elevation of 243 metres. Maingri and the adjoining town of Nurkot together form the largest and the most important town of the Constituency PP-134 (Narowal-III) of Provincial Assembly of Punjab.
