= Chaudhary Gulzar Ahmed Gujjar =

Pakistani politician

Member of the Provincial Assembly of the Punjab
- In office 29 May 2013 – 31 May 2018

Personal details
- Born: 19 November 1965 (age 60) Lahore
- Party: Pakistan Muslim League (Nawaz)

Chaudhary Gulzar Ahmed Gujjar is a Pakistani politician who was a Member of the Provincial Assembly of the Punjab, from May 2013 to May 2018.

== Early life and education ==
He was born on 19 November 1965 in Lahore.

He graduated in 1986 from University of the Punjab.

== Political career ==
He was elected to the Provincial Assembly of the Punjab as a candidate of Pakistan Muslim League (Nawaz) from Constituency PP-161 (Lahore-XXV) in the 2013 Pakistani general election.
