= Muhammad Iqbal Gujjar =

Pakistani politician

Member of the Provincial Assembly of the Punjab
- In office 15 August 2018 – 14 January 2023
- Constituency: PP-63 Gujranwala-XIII
- In office 29 May 2013 – 31 May 2018
- In office 1985–2007

Personal details
- Born: 6 July 1943 (age 83) Gurdaspur, India
- Other political affiliations: Pakistan Muslim League (N)

Chaudhry Muhammad Iqbal Gujjar (born 6 July 1943) is a Pakistani politician who had been a Member of the Provincial Assembly of the Punjab from August 2018 till January 2023. He has been Provincial Minister and Member of the Provincial Assembly of the Punjab several times between 1985 and May 2018.

== Early life and education ==
He was born on 6 July 1943 in Gurdaspur, India.

He graduated in 1963 from Government College, Sheikhupura and has the degree of Bachelor of Arts.

== Political career ==
He was elected to the Provincial Assembly of the Punjab from Constituency PP-137 (Gujranwala) in the 1985 Pakistani general election. During his tenure as Member of the Punjab Assembly, he served as Provincial Minister of Punjab for Revenue, Relief and Consolidations in the cabinet of Chief Minister Nawaz Sharif.

He was re-elected to the Provincial Assembly of the Punjab from Constituency PP-85 (Gujranwala) in the 1988 Pakistani general election and served as Provincial Minister of Punjab for Information in the cabinet of Chief Minister Nawaz Sharif.

He was re-elected to the Provincial Assembly of the Punjab as a candidate of Islami Jamhoori Ittehad from Constituency PP-85 (Gujranwala) in the 1990 Pakistani general election and served as Provincial Minister of Punjab for Agriculture in the cabinet of Chief Minister Ghulam Haider Wyne.

He was re-elected to the Provincial Assembly of the Punjab as a candidate of Pakistan Muslim League (N) (PML-N) from Constituency PP-85 (Gujranwala) in the 1993 Pakistani general election.

He was re-elected to the Provincial Assembly of the Punjab as a candidate of PML-N from Constituency PP-85 (Gujranwala) in the 1997 Pakistani general election and served as Provincial Minister of Punjab for Irrigation and Power in the cabinet of Chief Minister Shehbaz Sharif.

He was re-elected to the Provincial Assembly of the Punjab as a candidate of Pakistan Muslim League (Q) (PML-Q) from Constituency PP-98 (Gujranwala-VIII) in the 2002 Pakistani general election. He served as Provincial Minister of Punjab for Food from January 2003 to November 2006. In December 2006, he was made Provincial Minister of Punjab for Health.

He ran for the seat of the Provincial Assembly of the Punjab as a candidate of PML-Q from Constituency PP-98 (Gujranwala-VIII) in the 2008 Pakistani general election but was unsuccessful and lost the seat to a candidate of Pakistan Peoples Party.

He was re-elected to the Provincial Assembly of the Punjab as a candidate of PML-N from Constituency PP-98 (Gujranwala-VIII) in the 2013 Pakistani general election.

He was re-elected to the Provincial Assembly of the Punjab as a candidate of PML-N from Constituency PP-63 (Gujranwala-XIII) in the 2018 Pakistani general election. Following his successful election, PML-N nominated him for the office of Speaker of the Provincial Assembly of the Punjab. On 16 August 2018, he received 147 votes and lost the seat to Chaudhry Pervaiz Elahi who secured 201 votes.
