= Chaudhry Jaffar Iqbal Gujjar =

Pakistani politician

Member of the Senate of Pakistan
- In office January 2013 – March 2015

Member of the National Assembly of Pakistan
- In office 1993–1999
- Constituency: NA-149 (Rahim Yar Khan-III)

Member of the Provincial Assembly of the Punjab
- In office 1988–1993
- Constituency: PP-237 (Rahim Yar Khan-VI)

Personal details
- Other political affiliations: PMLN (1993-2015)
- Spouse: Begum Ishrat Ashraf
- Children: Zaib Jaffar (daughter); Chaudhry Muhammad Omar Jaffar (son)
- Relatives: Maiza Hameed (niece); Zaka Ashraf (brother-in-law/cousin); Shafqat Mahmood (cousin)

Chaudhry Jaffar Iqbal Gujjar (Punjabi, Urdu: چوہدری جعفر اقبال گجر) is a Pakistani politician who was a member of the Provincial Assembly of the Punjab from 1988 to 1993 and a member of the National Assembly of Pakistan from 1993 to 1999. He served as deputy speaker of the National Assembly from 1997 to 2001 and a member of the Senate of Pakistan from 2013 to 2015. He served in the Provincial cabinet of Punjab during his tenure as member of the Punjab Assembly, first as advisor to chief minister and then as Minister of Punjab for Health.

== Family ==
He is married to Begum Ishrat Ashraf and has a daughter Zaib Jaffar and a son Chaudhry Muhammad Omar Jaffar. Fellow politicians Shafqat Mahmood and Zaka Ashraf are his cousins.

== Political career ==
He was elected to the Provincial Assembly of Punjab as a candidate of Islami Jamhoori Ittehad (IJI) from Constituency PP-237 (Rahim Yar Khan-VI) in the 1988 Pakistani general election. He received 37,849 votes and defeated Irfan Abdullah, a candidate of Pakistan Peoples Party (PPP). During his tenure as Member of the Punjab Assembly, he served in the Provincial Punjab cabinet as Advisor to Chief Minister of Punjab, Nawaz Sharif.

He was re-elected to the Provincial Assembly of the Punjab as a candidate of IJI from Constituency PP-237 (Rahim Yar Khan-VI) in the 1990 Pakistani general election. He received 48,651 votes and defeated Muhammad Aslam Khan Narro, a candidate of Pakistan Democratic Alliance (PDA). During his tenure as Member of the Punjab Assembly, he served in the Provincial Punjab cabinet as Provincial Minister of Punjab for Health.

He was elected to the National Assembly of Pakistan as a candidate of Pakistan Muslim League (N) (PML-N) from Constituency NA-149 (Rahim Yar Khan-III) in the 1993 Pakistani general election. He received 79,720 votes and defeated Zafar Iqbal Warraich, a candidate of PPP.

He was re-elected to the National Assembly as a candidate of PML-N from Constituency NA-149 (Rahim Yar Khan-III) in the 1997 Pakistani general election. He received 76,201 votes and defeated Zafar Iqbal Warraich, a candidate of PPP. He served as deputy speaker of the National Assembly from February 1997 to August 2001.

He was elected to the Senate of Pakistan in January 2013 where he served until retirement in March 2015.
