= Haji Muhammed Aslam Khan Khichi =

Haji Muhammed Aslam Khan Khichi (Punjabi, Urdu: حاجی محمد اسلم خان کھچی) was a Pakistani politician.

== Early life ==
Haji Muhammed Aslam Khan Khichi was born in the Great Khichi Family of the Vehari District. His father, Shah Muhammed Khan, was Magistrate of Multan Division. He completed his school education at Sadiq Public School, Bahawalpur.

== Political career ==
His political career started in 1977 when he was elected Member District Council Unopposed. Muhammed Aslam Khan remained a Member District Council for two consecutive terms. He also emerged as one of the best agriculturists during the 1990s. He later joined the Pakistan People's Party on the request of Mohatarma Benazir Bhutto in 1988. During the tenure of Nawaz Sharif, Muhammed Aslam Khan was sent to jail as a political prisoner for three months.

As an independent candidate, Muhammed Aslam Khan was elected to parliament in 1993 general elections. After which he became very popular within the politics of Pakistan and soon became a very close aid of the Prime Minister Benazir Bhutto. He also attended a session for the UN General Assembly held in Washington with her.

He was the main person to outcast the Punjab government of Manzoor Ahmad Watoo.

He was appointed as a senior advisor to Mr. Arif Nakai, CM of Punjab. Muhammed Aslam Khan remained a political figure in the Vehari District, though he left national politics due to health problems.

== Last days ==
Muhammed Aslam Khan Khichi died on 6 December 2008 at the age of 53. Thousands of people attended his funeral, including some national leaders and Members of the Parliament. After his death, his younger brother Muhammed Akram Khan Khichi took charge of his politics.
