= Maiza Hameed =

Pakistani politician

Member of the National Assembly of Pakistan
- In office 13 August 2018 – 10 August 2023
- Constituency: Reserved seat for women
- In office 1 June 2013 – 31 May 2018
- Constituency: Reserved seat for women

Member of the Provincial Assembly of the Punjab
- In office 9 April 2008 – 20 March 2013
- Constituency: Reserved seat for Women

Personal details
- Other political affiliations: PMLN (2018-2023)
- Relatives: Chaudhry Jaffar Iqbal Gujjar (uncle)

Maiza Hameed Gujjar (Punjabi, Urdu: مائزہ حمید) is a politician who was mostly awarded a reserved seat because she is from a Gujjar family that had been a member of the National Assembly of Pakistan from August 2018 until August 2023. Previously she was a member of the National Assembly from June 2013 to May 2018 and a member of the Provincial Assembly of the Punjab from 2008 to 2013.

== Political career ==
Maiza Hameed was elected to the Provincial Assembly of the Punjab as a candidate of Pakistan Muslim League (N) (PML-N) on a reserved seat for women in the 2008 Pakistani general election.

She was elected to the National Assembly of Pakistan as a candidate of PML-N on a reserved seat for women from Punjab in the 2013 general election. In January 2017, she was appointed as the Federal Parliamentary Secretary for Capital Administration and Development Division.

She was re-elected to the National Assembly as a candidate of PML-N on a seat reserved for women from Punjab in the 2018 Pakistani general election. Following her election, Pakistan Tehreek-e-Insaf (PTI) filed a petition in the Islamabad High Court to challenge her election.
