= Zaka Ashraf =

Pakistani executive and cricket administrator (born 1952)

- ذكا اشرف

27th, 29th & 37th Chairman of Pakistan Cricket Board
- In office 6 July 2023 – 5 February 2024
- President: Arif Alvi
- Prime Minister: Shehbaz Sharif; Anwaar ul Haq Kakar (caretaker)
- Preceded by: Najam Sethi
- Succeeded by: Mohsin Naqvi
- In office 15 January 2014 – 10 February 2014
- President: Mamnoon Hussain
- Prime Minister: Nawaz Sharif
- Preceded by: Ramiz Raja (acting)
- Succeeded by: Najam Sethi
- In office 27 October 2011 – 24 June 2013
- President: Asif Ali Zardari
- Prime Minister: Yusuf Raza Gillani; Raja Pervaiz Ashraf; Nawaz Sharif
- Preceded by: Ijaz Butt
- Succeeded by: Najam Sethi (acting)

President of Zarai Taraqiati Bank Limited
- In office 9 September 2008 – 25 October 2011

Personal details
- Born: Muhammad Zaka Ashraf; 9 September 1952 (age 73) Mandi Bahauddin, Punjab, Pakistan
- Relations: Shafqat Mahmood (cousin); Chaudhry Jaffar Iqbal Gujjar (cousin)
- Parent: Chaudhry Muhammad Ashraf (father)
- Profession: Businessman; Administrator
- Website: agipk.com

Chaudhry Muhammad Zaka Ashraf (Punjabi, Urdu: چوہدری محمد ذكا اشرف; born 9 September 1952) is a Pakistani executive administrator who has served as the chairman of the Pakistan Cricket Board in three different tenures.

== Early life and education ==
Born into a Gujjar family, Zaka is the son of Chaudhry Muhammad Ashraf, a businessman and influential PPP politician close to Zulfikar Ali Bhutto. He belongs to a traditional industrial and farming family of Punjab.

Zaka is also cousin of senior PTI politician Shafqat Mahmood and senior PML-N politician Chaudhry Jaffar Iqbal Gujjar.

Zaka has been associated with Pakistan Peoples Party since 1970, under the government of Zulfikar Ali Bhutto. While he was in college, he developed close ties with future politician Asif Ali Zardari, due to their similar political views. After passing out from Petaro, he took his bachelor's degree and then joined his father in his business.

Ashraf is an alumnus of the Sadiq Public School, Bahwalpur, and the Cadet College Petaro, from where he graduated in 1973.

== Chairman of Pakistan Cricket Board ==
He was appointed as the chairman of Pakistan Cricket Board on 15 October 2011 by the President of Pakistan and took the charge on 27 October 2011. However, on 10 February 2014, the Prime Minister of Pakistan Nawaz Sharif dissolved the PCB governing board and sacked him from the chairmanship of PCB. In August 2012, he was elected as chairman Development Committee of Asian Cricket Council.

=== Suspension by the Court ===
On 28 May 2013, the Islamabad High Court stopped Zaka Ashraf from working as Pakistan Cricket Board Chairman on the petition of that the election of Zaka as PCB chairman was malafide by the former coach of Pakistan Cricket team. Moreover, the IHC had barred him from performing his duties on the grounds that the process of his election was not transparent. On 24 June 2013, the case was adjourned till further notice.

=== Re-appointment ===
The Islamabad High Court reinstated Zaka Ashraf as chairman of the Pakistan Cricket Board on 15 January 2014. The decision to reinstate Ashraf was taken by a two-member division bench consisting of Justice Noorul Haq Qureshi and Justice Riaz Ahmed Khan. The court accepted the intra-court appeal against the decision by a single-member bench of IHC consisting of Justice Shaukat Aziz Siddiqui. Previously on 19 July 2013, the Islamabad High Court had declared the appointment of Ashraf "illegal" and directed the acting PCB chief Najam Sethi to hold elections within 90 days. Zaka Ashraf held this office until 10 February 2014.

=== Third term ===
In June 2023, he was nominated by Pakistan Peoples Party for the position of chairman PCB opposite to Najam Sethi. On 20 June 2023, Najam Sethi announced his withdrawal from PCB chairmanship race. On the same day, Zaka Ashraf was appointed as the member of the Pakistan Cricket Board Board of Governors. On 6 July 2023, he assumed his role as the Chairman of Pakistan Cricket Board by replacing Najam Sethi. On 19 January 2024, he resigned from his position as the Chairman of Management Committee and member of BoG. He was succeeded by Moshin Naqvi as the Chairman PCB.
