= Taukeer Alam =

Indian conservationist, citizen ornithologist and scientist

Taukeer Alam Lodha
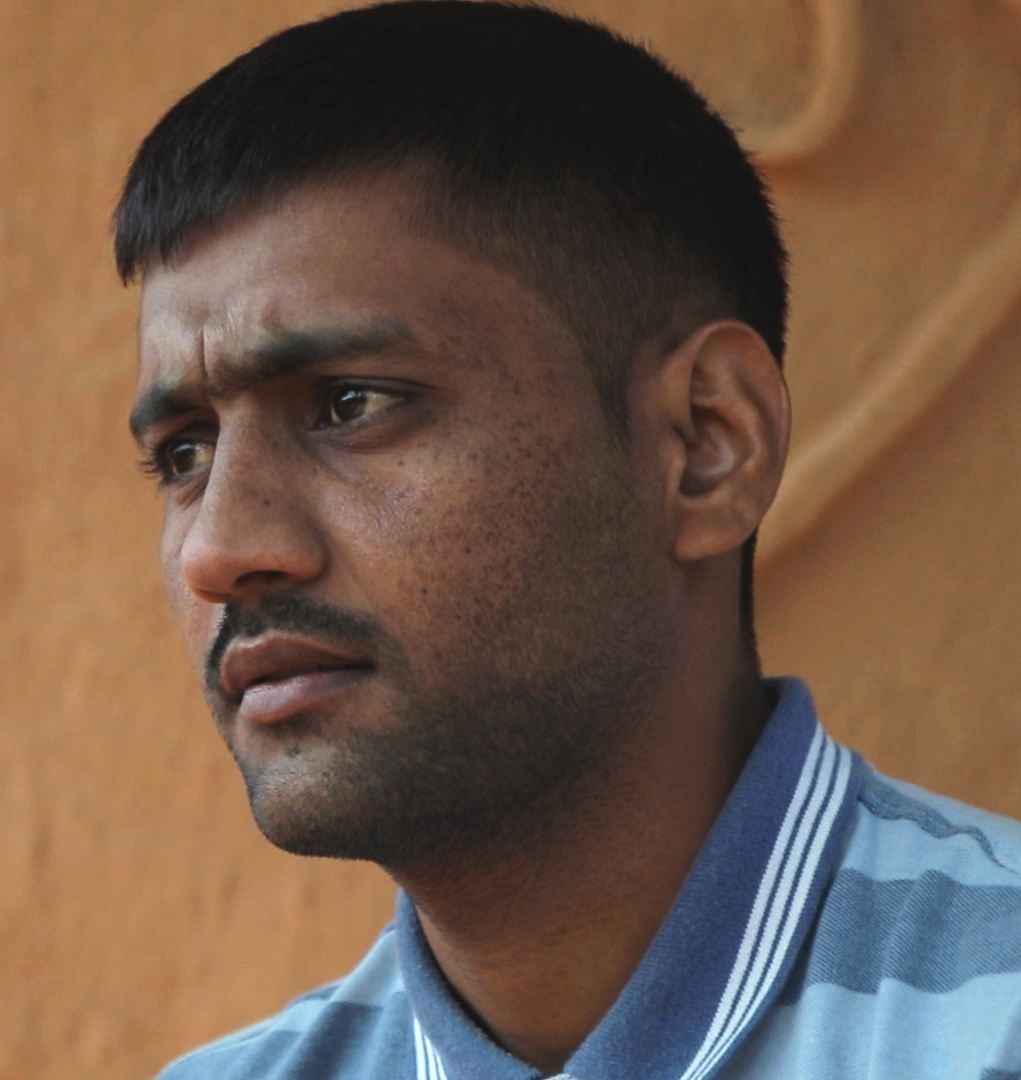
- Alam in November 2019
- Born: Rajaji National Park, Uttarakhand, India
- Occupations: Environmentalist; citizen scientist

Taukeer Alam Lodha is an Indian nature conservationist, writer, community educator and birder from Uttarakhand. He has documented the traditional knowledge of the Van Gujjar people from the Sivalik Hills region, authoring three books and translating over 170 children's books in his native language, Van Gujjari. He has established community-based education from displaced Van Gujjar families and worked with the state forest department to educate over 4,000 students on environmental protection. He is a 2022 Inlaks Shivdasani Fellow, a Sanctuary Asia awardee and a Samvaad Fellow.

== Early life and education ==
Alam introducing himself in documentary MarginalizedAadhaar

Alam was born into the Van Gujjar tribe in Uttarakhand, and grew up in Rajaji National Park, developing an early interest in observing wildlife, particularly birds. His grandparents were nomadic pastorialists, migrating from Rajaji with their water buffalo herds to the grasslands in the upper Himalayas during summer, and migrating back to Rajaji post monsoons. In 1983 Rajaji was declared a national park, forcing the Van Gujjars to quit pastorialism and relocate outside of the forest, and work as agricultural labourers. Following a larger disruption in 2003 his family moved to Gaindi Khata near Haridwar when he was nine. He was admitted to school but dropped out within days, staying at home for the following two years. In 2018 he graduated from high school through distance education.

== Career ==
At the age of 18, he started assisting researchers from the Bangalore-based Centre for Ecological Sciences at the Indian Institute of Science that were then visiting Rajaji and ecologist Soumya Prasad invited him to assist in research. Later he joined the Nature Science Initiative at Dehradun as a field coordinator where he taught himself data collection and analysis, assisting in field research. In six years he became one of the most prominent birders from Uttarakhand.

== Community education ==
It was reported in 2023 that Alam and his friends conducted a survey in 2018 or earlier, finding out about 600 out of 3,200 being enrolled in schools, and only about 100 attending schools. In 2018 he and with his Van Gujjar friends established a school in Laldhang to teach children from the Van Gujjar settlements. Later this team established an organisation called Maee ("buffalo caretaker" in Van Gujjari) to educate children. At Maee he also created teaching materials like nature-based games and used traditional games and folktales to teach environmental conservation. In 2019 he and the Maee team established a community-run library in his house. In 2022, the number of students came down to 100 from 250 due to the COVID-19 pandemic. He has been collaborating with the forest department to take children for environmental conservation trips, teaching them about seed dispersal and other bird behaviour through birdwatching festivals and training programmes.

== Selected works ==
- Alam, Taukeer (April 2024). Vana Gujjarī Kahāniyāṃ. Maee.
- Alam, Taukeer (April 2024). Vana Gujjarī Hindī Śabdakośa. Maee.
- Alam, Taukeer (April 2024). Vana Gujjarī Baiṃta: Vana Gujjarī Gīta. Maee.
- Alam, Taukeer (April 2024). Bajarāta Te Khvāna: Vana Gujjarī Paheliyām̐ Aura Lokokatiyām̐. Maee.

== See also ==
- Van Gujjar people
- Gurjars in Uttarakhand
- Van Gujjari
