= Van Gujjar people =

Pastoral ethnic group of India

وان گجر
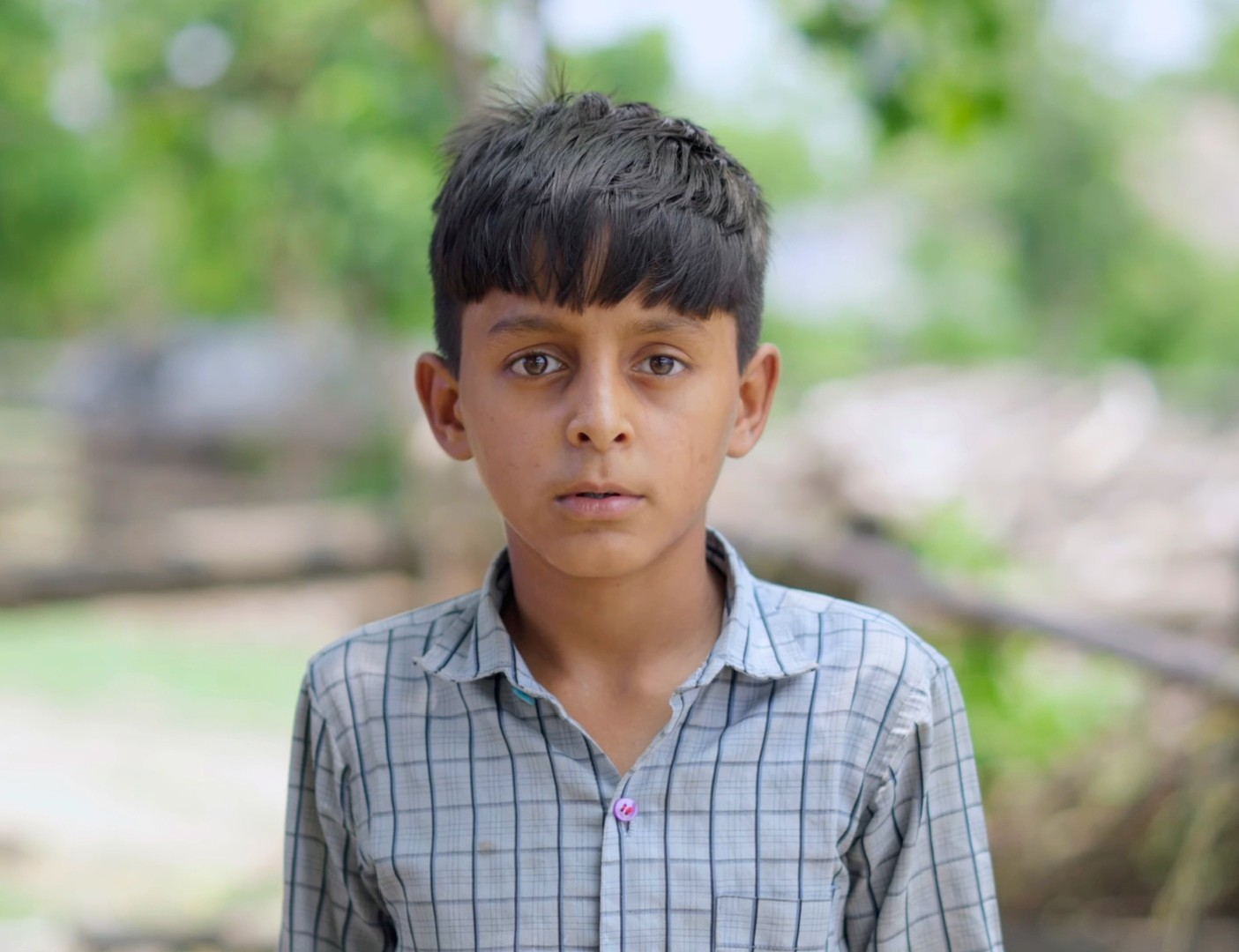
- A Van Gujjar child from Uttarakhand

Total population
- 1,59,784 (see below)

Regions with significant populations
- (India) Uttarakhand, Himachal Pradesh, Western Uttar Pradesh
- Uttarakhand: 70,000 (Note: There are 70,000 Van Gujjars in Uttarakhand state.)
- Punjab, Haryana, West U.P: 80,000
- Himachal Pradesh: 9,784

Languages
- Van Gujjari, Pahadi, Urdu, Hindi

Religion
- Sunni Islam

Related ethnic groups
- Gaddis • Bakarwal • Bhoksa people • Bhotiyas

The Van Gujjars (Note: Van Gurjars is also known as Jammuwallahs, Ban Gujjar, Muhamadan Gujjars or Jungali (forest) Gurjars.) are a Van Gujjari-speaking nomadic ethnic group and a sub-tribe of the larger Muslim Gujjar community. They are traditionally herders and primarily reside in the Shivalik Hills region of Uttarakhand, Himachal Pradesh and Western Uttar Pradesh. Following Islam, they are a pastoral semi-nomadic community known for practicing transhumance. Van Gujjars started adopting Islam between the 13th and 14th centuries, with Sufi teachings playing a significant role in their conversion. The Van Gujjars of Uttarakhand and Uttar Pradesh have strong ties with the Muslim Gujjars of Himachal Pradesh, with intermarriages being common, but they have not maintained relations with Hindu Gujjars of North India.

Historically, they were referred to as Jammuwallah or Dodhi Gujars by others, but they simply identified themselves as Gujjars.

The Shivalik Hills Forest Division has been a seasonal habitat for the Van Gujjars since the late 1920s. Traditionally, they'd migrate with their livestock, spending winter in Shivalik Hills and summer in the meadows of Himachal Pradesh and Uttarakhand. Currently about 4,000 Van Gujjar families reside in Shivalik hills forest area.

Van Gujjars are known to be lactovegetarians due to sole dependence on animal-herding and milk delivery as a livelihood opportunity.

== History ==
=== Colonial history ===
British records of the forest department confirm a Van Gujjars presence in the Doon Valley, after the British regained control of it in the aftermath of the Anglo-Gurkha War (1814–15). In some measure, this was recognition of the law of their rights as inhabitants of the forests, an official incorporation of their custodianship as part of forest management, a continuation of the Van Gujjars occupation of the Doon valley of Uttarakhand.

The state focuses on fixed boundaries and territories, whether legally or just culturally, is at odds with the Van Gujjars existence as nomads. A clear example of that is the continued consequences of the British Forest Act of 1865, which barred indigenous communities from access to their ancestral territories. Decades after India was freed from colonial rule, the story has not changed. The Uttarakhand Forest Department, with its biased view of the Van Gujjars, authenticated a history of abuse and violations of rights representing their native pastoral culture as a threat to conservation.

In an 1870 account, British forester Sainthill Eardley-Wilmot described the Van Gujjars as a herding tribe who were highly dependent upon the forest and annually moved about the Himalaya. Wilmot noted their different ways of [he] talking about them somewhat favorably.

The British colonial regime in India classified Van Gujjars as "criminal tribes" in accordance with the 1871 Criminal Tribes Act. The Act also marked those who did not conform to gender norms as "eunuchs." The law was amended, India abolished this law in 1949 and replaced it with its own law, while the section related to gender non-conformity was repealed in 1911.

British officer Williams' notes from 1874 confirm the Van Gujjars movement into the Doon Valley of Uttarakhand during the 18th century. Other historical documents from British forestry members further verify that the Van Gujjars have roots within the history of the Doon Valley.

The British surveys from the 1880s show the Van Gujjars in five (khols; with the term khol being defined as streams, rivulets, or springs) had ownership of 542 buffaloes, 26 cows, and 81 sheep or goats. While this number is far fewer than the earlier numbers from the various accounts, it is surprising because it had been noted in the late 1870s, that various herders individual owned herds of up to 350 with respect to the cattle ownership. The reader can only wonder if the number was understated or less Van Gujjar moved the Shivalik Hills in the later part of the 1880s.

In 1885, Fisher's reports to the British authorities alerted them to a dangerous situation: the people of Bashahr state had violently displaced the Van Gujjars from their territory, and some have alleged that they performed the act of sacrificing a Gujjar boy in a temple ritual. Prior to that in 1884, an act of violence had occurred, in which several Van Gujjars were alleged to have killed a man in the Jaunsar-Bawar.

Their mode of life as nomads, with nothing but a wandering lifestyle devoid of fixed dwellings or agricultural settlements, was powerful enough to separate them from the villagers that the colonial state could easily comprehend as the 'locals'. Their non-settled lifestyle resulted in them deviating from the colonial state definition of a proper subject. Again in January 1885, an order from the North-Western Province demonstrated their ambiguous relationship with the British Raj. One such order was as follows:

All Gujars and other wandering herdsmen are warned that for the ensuing year, only 150 heads of buffaloes will be allowed to graze in the Jaunsari, Tehri Garhwal, Raimgarh and Dadi partitions of the Jaunsar Division.

E.M. Moir, the Conservator of Forest for the Jaunsar Division Department in the North-Western Provinces, wrote on August 17, 1887, regarding a severe cattle disease outbreak that severely affected a Van Gujjar herder who lost 300 cattle out of the 350 cattle he managed.

In 1902, a new provision was proposed to regulate Van Gujjar migration. When the herders returned to British provinces each fall, the herders were to pay a small security deposit of 8 Annas (half rupee) that would be returned in April, assuming they did not engage in excessive cutting of trees in protected forests. In Dickinson's view, this could be a good source of revenue – 50 rupees for every 100 cattle by charging 8 Annas per herder.

British colonial document records indicate that the Van Gujjars moved to the Shivalik Hills in the Saharanpur district of Uttar Pradesh during the mid or late 19th century due to restrictions on forests and growing population pressures in Punjab. Moving further eastward, they moved into the rough lands from Uttar Pradesh up to Uttarakhand, including Rajaji National Park forest area in Uttarakhand. According to the document, the British Government acted quickly to appoint a man to identify and mark in the area those forests that would have commercially valuable timber reserves.

=== Land ownership and permit system ===
Annual grazing permits have been issued to family or clan leaders of the Van Gujjar community since the British Raj that identify precise compartments of use by each group. Most of the significant decisions about these compartments and migration patterns is performed by the family head to better manage resources.

The Van Gujjars are a landless group who inhabit and graze on state-managed common land (managed by the forest departments), typically within Uttarakhand, Uttar Pradesh and Himachal Pradesh. They historically used these spaces for centuries before the British colonial administration instituted a permit system to regulate Van Gujjar nomadism as part of a broader colonial goal of harvesting forest resources. These permits outlined specific grazing areas and livestock quotas per family unit.

The permit system is still active today, requiring Van Gujjars to annually present their documentation and pay taxes for grazing in the Himalayan meadows and for using forest products in the Sivalik Hills, in order to have access to buffalo grazing rights.

=== Post-colonial history ===
The Van Gujjars experience systemic marginalization as a response to exclusionary British-based forest policy. Their position as Muslims and indigenous people renders them particularly vulnerable. Unlike other indigenous Indian Tribes, Van Gujjars never acquired Scheduled Tribe (ST) status, most likely because of their religious identity in a communal and ethnically divided society. A lack of some basic rights such as domicile, advocacy, and education status all play a role in their marginalization.

The plight of Van Gujjars is further evidenced by a report issued by India's National Human Rights Commission regarding Van Gujjars living in Rajaji National Park who face harassment and other abuses from staff in the Uttarakhand Forest Department.

Those living in Himachal Pradesh face even more dire situations, with many Van Gujjars reported as homeless and landless. A government report in 1983 reported that only 11.83% of Van Gujjars owned land (with even fewer actually having homes). That means 88.17% of Van Gujjars have nowhere to build a permanent house.

The association between the Shivalik range and the Indian army began in the 1980s, yet the state still attempts to expel all the Van Gujjars from the Uttar Pradesh and Uttarakhand Forests. The Van Gujjars distrust the forest department, who they believe is the ultimate authority responsible for eviction under the guise of conservation or development. Their distrust is compounded by the assertion of the Indian Forest Department that 25,000 hectares are unoccupied, when there are actually 1,800 Van Gujjar families occupying that same land.

While the Indian Forest Rights Act, 2006 recognizes their rights for forest land as "traditional forest dwellers," they experience conflict with the local state forest authorities denying human and livestock presence inside "reserved parks." As Muslims, they have frequently been the target of actions from the Uttarakhand Forest Department, wrongful eviction notices, forced evictions, and other illegal conduct from the forest department.

In 2011 and 2017, the state Government of Uttarakhand issued additional displacement orders affecting certain Van Gujjar families in those areas. The 2018 decision by the High Court that Van Gujjars were illegally occupying forest land caused a renewed uproar as they had yet to provide any framework for rehabilitation. The Supreme Court of India intervened later that year, stopping the High Court from enforcing the eviction order. In 2020, Van Gujjar families were engaged in a confrontation with forest officials, and the officials physically assaulted men and women from the community during the confrontation and arrested some members. The Uttarakhand High Court ordered the government to form a committee to address the issues faced by Van Gujjars.

On May 25, 2021, the Uttarakhand High Court ruled that the Van Gujjars have a right to access meadows inside the Govind Pashu Vihar National Park, relying on the 2006 Forest Rights Act, and even ordered the local administration to allow them access. The Court noted the Van Gujjars had been living in indignity for a month at that time, at which point the Court directed the appropriate authorities to grant access to summer habitat, and guarantee that Van Gujjars and their livestock were provided at a minimum basic supplies by June 15, 2021.

At the same time, the Van Gujjar Tribal Yuva Sangathan sought recognition under the 2006 Forest Right Act and presented claims at the SDM office, in 2022, for the community's ST status. In 2023, the Van Gujjar organization Van Panchayat Sangharsh Morcha disputes eviction notices, in 2023 the forest department of Uttarkhand acknowledged their errors in the eviction notices they provided to the Van Gujjars.

In 2023, a flood devastated the Naouki settlement of the Van Gujjars in Uttarkhand's Haridwar district, with 9 out of 100 homes destroyed, due to a combination of unusually early and intense rainfall. The Van Gujjars contend that the damage was exacerbated by two linear retaining walls constructed by the NHAI as part of the Char dham highway project. The NHAI generally takes location into account when considering flood damage, but, due to the Naouki settlement being a non-official settlement of the Van Gujjars the area was not considered. The Van Gujjars settlement was not represented in official records as they are not regarded as permanent residents according to the Forest Department, and thus were not entitled to any protection and rights.

== Etymology and origin ==
=== Etymology ===
The term Van Gujjar, is a combination of two Van Gujjari words" van" and" Gujjar", rephrasing to" forest- dwelling"" Gujjars". The community added the prefix" van" in the 1980s to distinguish itself from other Gujjars, particularly the Hindu Gujjars of north western India, historically, the Van Gujjars were known as Jammuwallahs and Dodhi Gujjars, while within their own community, they call themselves as Gujjars.

=== Origin ===
They are believed to have migrated from the Kashmir region, passing through Sirmaur before settling in the Bhabar region of the Shivalik Hills roughly 1,500 years ago. They further trace their origins back to the Gurjara Kingdom, which dates back to 570 CE in what is now Rajasthan, North India.

As per the Van Gujjars ancestors, they came to Uttarakhand from Jammu. A queen from Jammu and Kashmir married into a royal family in Uttarakhand but missed her motherland's Gujjar community. She requested her father to shoot some Gujjars to her new home, and they came as part of her dowry around 250 years ago.

== Demographics ==
The Van Gujjars are a forest- lodging, pastoral Muslim community primarily abiding in the Himalayan and Sivalik foothills of northern India. They're traditionally set up around the Himalayan countries similar to Uttarakhand, Uttar Pradesh, and Himachal Pradesh.

Van Gujjars also lives in Haryana and Indian Punjab. Where they live in settled villages of Haryana, Indian Punjab and Uttar Pradesh, and their population is roughly 80,000 in these states.

=== Uttarakhand ===
In Uttarakhand, Van Gujjars are mostly found in the southern regions, particularly Nainital and Dehradun. They traditionally resettle with their buffalo herds through forested regions and have longstanding seasonal routes between downtime and summer ranges within the state.

=== Himachal Pradesh ===
In Himachal Pradesh, Van Gujjars are mostly found in the southern and northern regions. Their areas of settlements include Kangra, Bilaspur, Sirmour, Shimla, and Chamba districts. There are almost 9,784 Van Gujjars in Kangra and Chamba districts of Himachal Pradesh, and they make up 97.12% of the entire Gujjar population in these districts.

=== Uttar Pradesh ===
In Uttar Pradesh their settlements are mostly found in the Chapdi range of the Sivalik forest located near the Saharanpur, Bijnor, Rampur, and Pilibhit districts. From 2002 to 2023, it was reported that 50 or further families of Van Gujjars were killed by the illegal firing of the Asan Field Firing Range of the Indian army. Because of similar firing, the Van Gujjars constantly requested the administration of the Saharanpur district for the rehabilitation and relocation of the Van Gujjars from the Shivalik Hills to landmass areas of the quarter, but the district administration did not hear their demands.

== Religion ==
The Van Gujjars are fully Muslim and follow the Sunni sect of Islam, like other Muslim Gujjar communities including the Bakarwals.

It is believed they adopted Islam through Sufism in the thirteenth to fourteenth centuries during the Turkish rule in Indian subcontinent.

Van Gujjars have strong ties with the Muslim Gujjars of Himachal Pradesh, with intermarriages being common, but they have not maintained relations with Hindu Gujjars.

== Clan system ==
Van Gujjars clans overlap with other Gujjar communities including Muslim Gujjar, Hindu Gujjars and Bakarwals. Some of their notable clans include.

- Lodha
- Chechi
- Chauhan
- Kushan (Kasana)
- Khatana
- Chopra
- Bagri
- Dinda
- Kalas
- Baniya
- Padhana
- Bhainsi

== Culture and traditions ==
Taukeer Alam sharing the Van Gujjar wedding rituals and clothings in Van Gujjari

According to Islam, which does not prohibit the practice of family planning, Van Gujjars engage in nomadism, rely primarily on a herding lifestyle, and place great physical demands on women, which has contributed to low fertility among their families. Divorce does not tend to happen among Van Gujjar families, who try to bring some resolution to disputes and issues of domestic violence through the local Panchayat.

The Van Gujjar community is known for raising an indigenous breed of wild buffalos called "Gojri" or "Gujari".

=== Dressing ===
Van Gujjar women wear long-sleeved Salwar kameez style dresses, often bright colors, often worn with a dupatta as a way of covering the head. Children also cover their heads, wearing dresses very much alike to the adults.

Van Gujjar women wear long kurtas, churidar trousers, and jackets, and do not generally practice purdah. Van Gujjar men are easily recognizable to outsiders because of their distinctive dress, including turbans, loose tahmat, and often sporting long beards and waistcoats.

Van Gujjar men wear a style of cap with local embroidery, called "Topi," for cultural events and while taking part in rituals.

=== Kinship ===
Both men and women of the Van Gujjar community have a high level of investment into their animals, which is important in determining relationships. The family is the basic unit of society for the Van Gujjars defining a structure of the father and son, and their buffaloes. These families gather to form settlements where families are part of a larger kin group or clan that share a direct ancestor.

=== Marriage ===
Male and female Van Gujjars traditionally practice monogamy, and polygamy is rare. Due to education and a strong religious belief, they also generally oppose family planning.

Marriage customs among Van Gujjar people are practiced in ways that are different from any other Muslim communities in Northern India. The first notable feature is the mehndi ceremony, where men and women put simple traditional henna designs on their hands. Also, marriage ceremonies typically last several days, to host guests who have traveled from far distances. Furthermore, it is a custom of the groom's family to give the bride and groom a buffalo to symbolize the family's success. These customs and others speak to the strong communal structure of Van Gujjar society.

During wedding celebrations, Van Gujjar brides adorn themselves with beautiful silver ornaments, including chains, Sargast, Gani, Mahail, Dolara, Bangles, rings and earrings. Every ornament concontains an important meaning and has cultural and social implications for the community.

=== Gender Status ===
In Van Gujjars female and male members are treated equally. During migration activities, women take charge, including the oldest women, who are responsible for many of the interactions with authorities. The balance of power has shifted causing women to become powerful as leaders of the migration group as opposed to supportive followers. Van women have also readily agreed to use modern methods of family planning in some of the government programs.

=== Food ===
The traditional diet of the Van Gujjars is based on chappatis, which are made from either wheat or maize flour and are often eaten with potato or onion curry, and on occasion, lentil curry. Some members have access to homegrown vegetables, but the consumption of meat is limited to special occasions. Notably the Van Gujjars do not kill their state-owned buffaloes for food. In terms of behavior, they tend to not consume alcohol but enjoy cigarettes, tobacco, and betel leaf.

Essentially the Van Gujjars eat only vegetarian meals, with dairy being a prominent feature of their diet. Daily cuisine is often made with yogurt, lassi, kheer, desi ghee, butter, and Paneer from milk.

Similar to Hindu Gujjars, they neither slaughter their buffaloes nor sell them for meat.

=== Dera ===
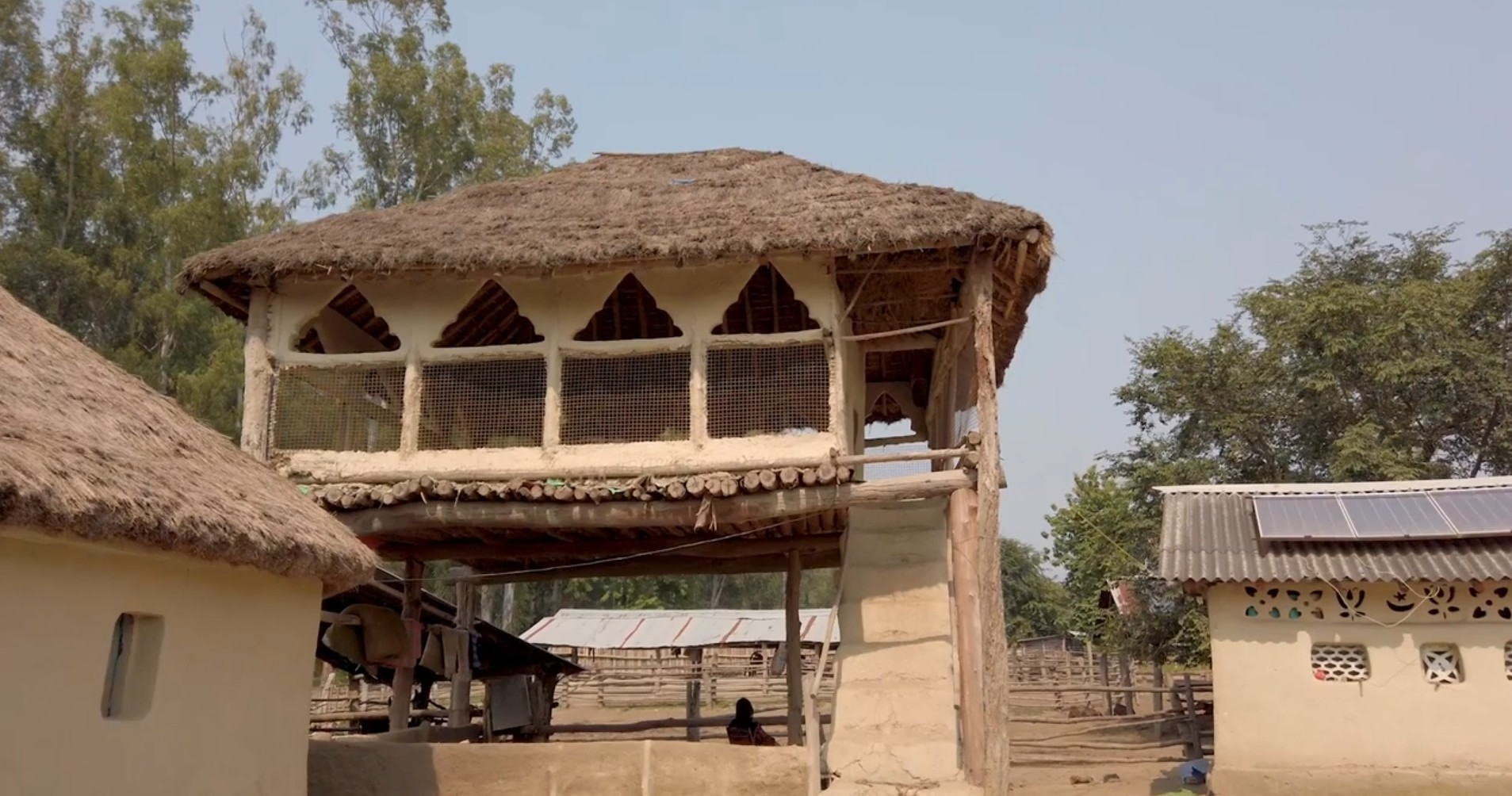
A traditional double floor Van Gujjar house

Van Gujjars reside in traditional dwelling units called Deras, either clustered into small groups or dispersed across the forest area. Their homes are very clean and well maintained, and are actually quite large, having roofs made of thatch and a conical form, supported by sturdy wooden poles.

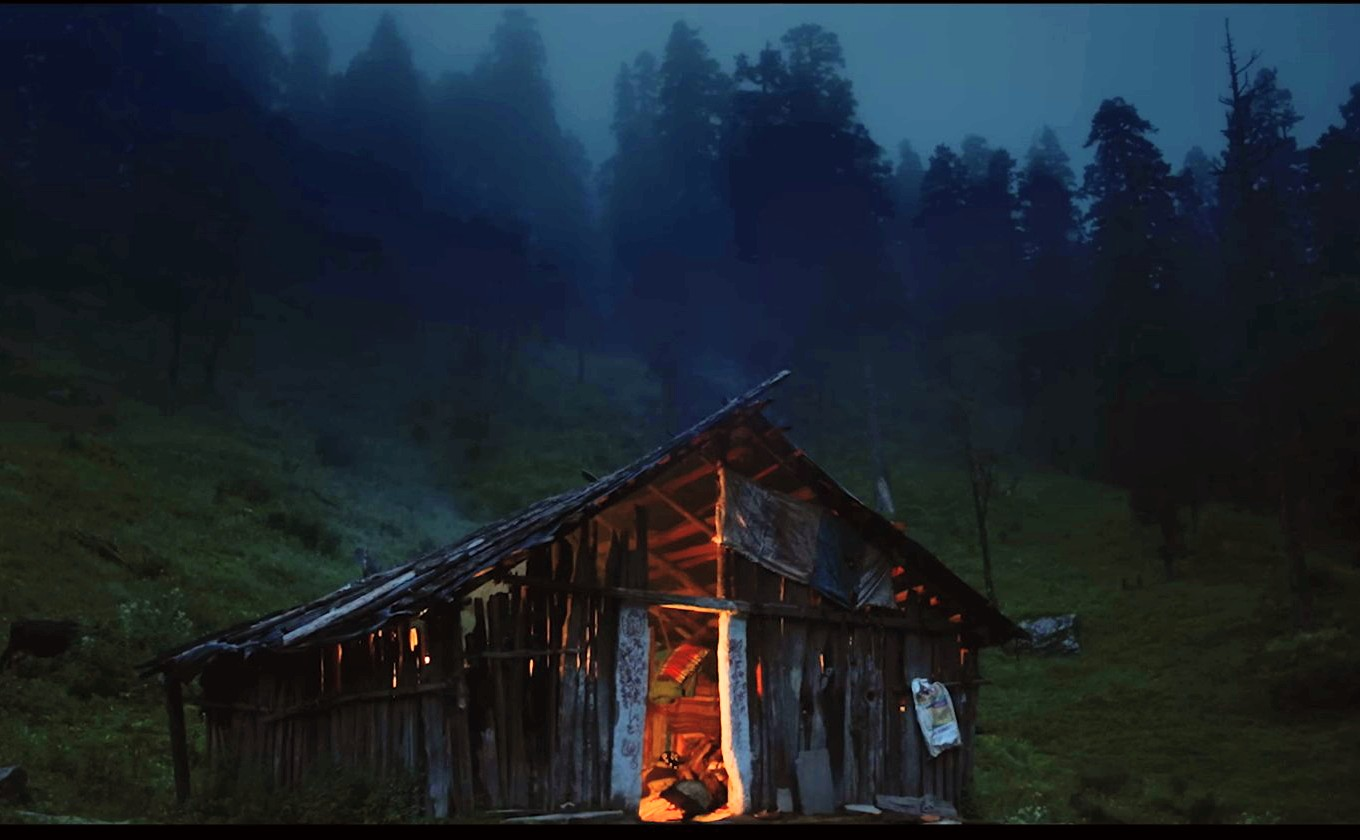
A Van Gujjar Dera at night

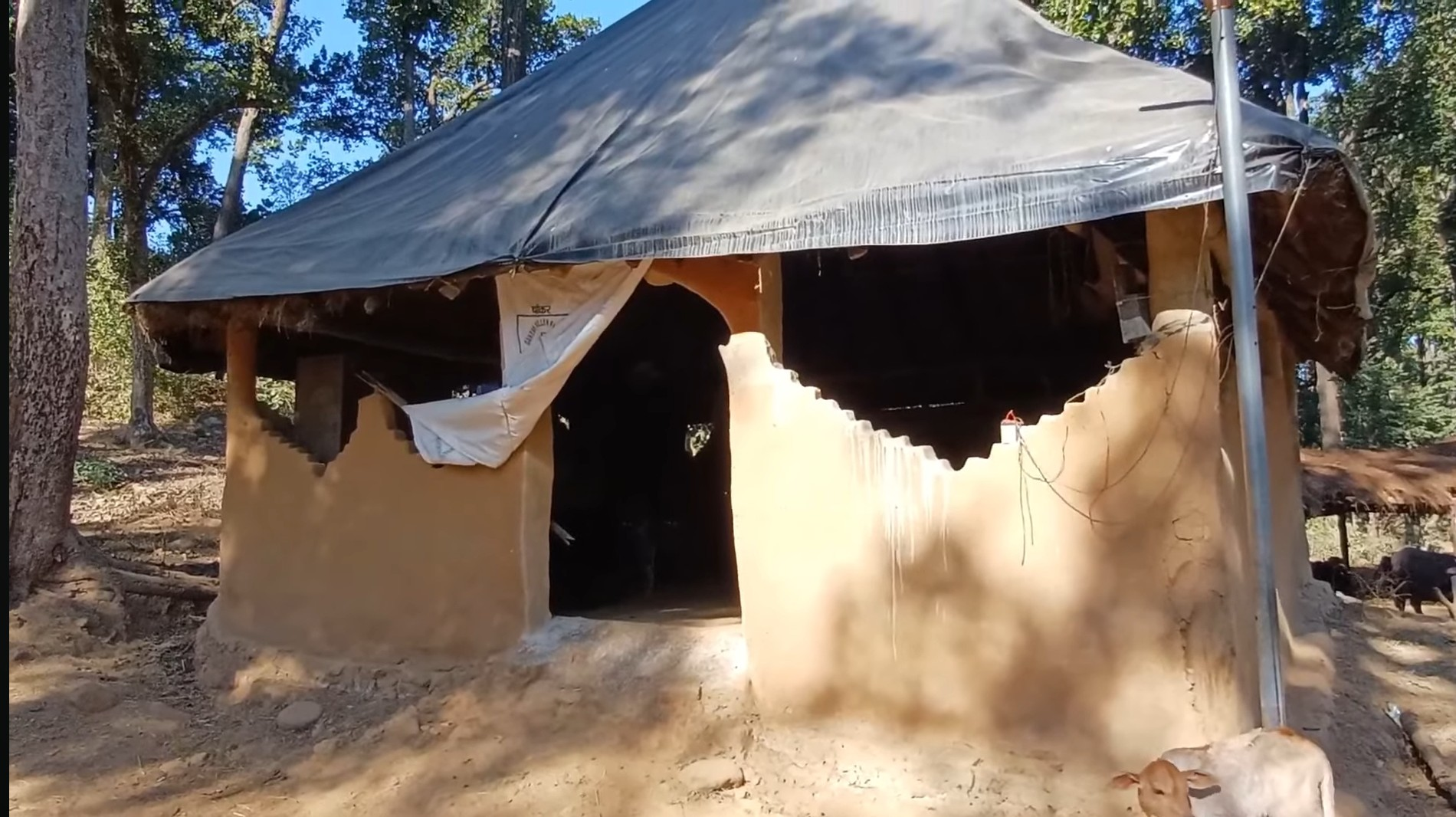
A Van Gujjar house in day light

The animal shelters are separated from the living quarters, and are made of sturdy wooden frames with thatched roofs that protect their livestock from wild animals at night. Some Deras are covered with mud walls, and wealthier families may have some thatched huts for a gathering place with many cots inside.

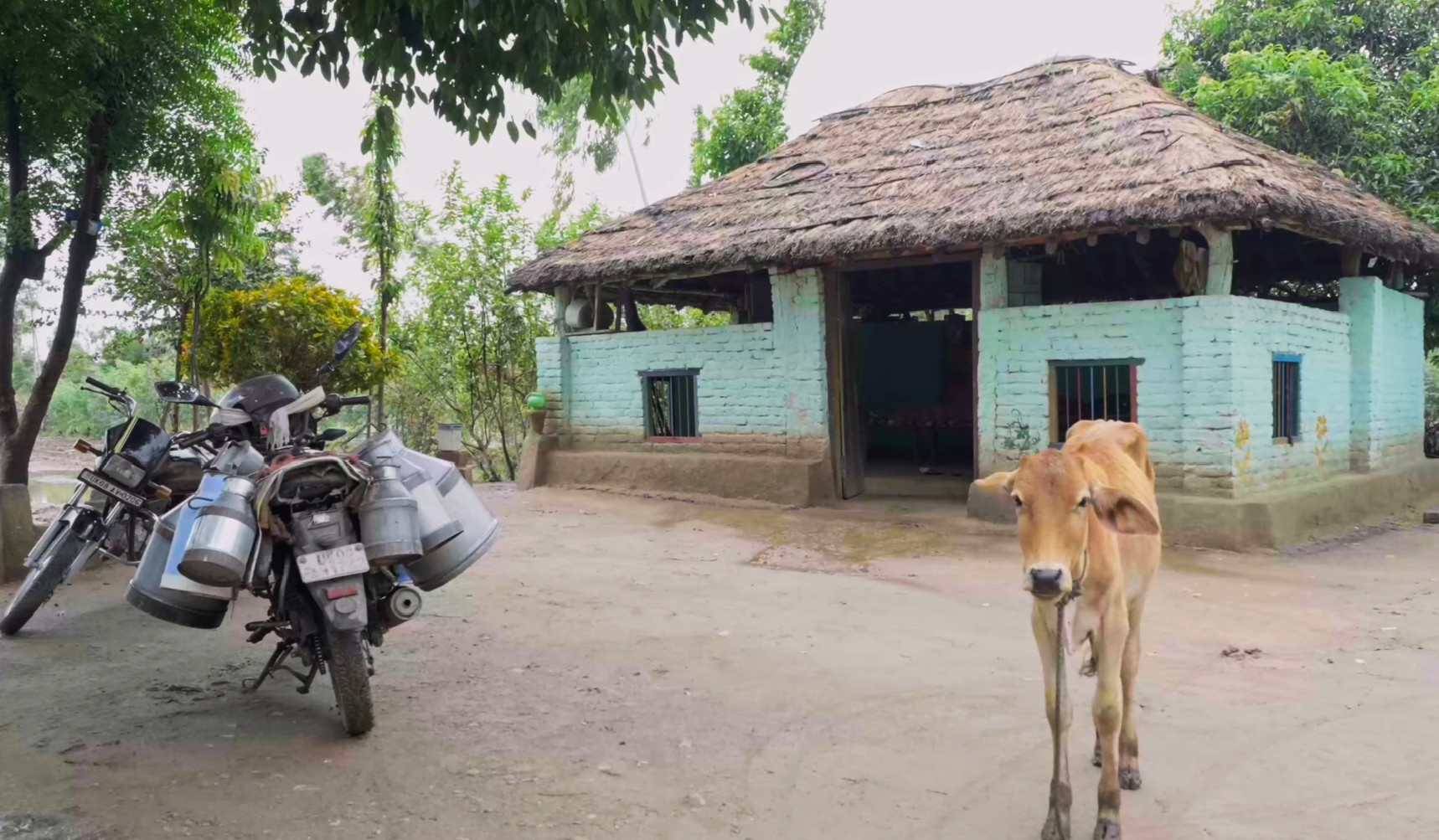
Mud made Van Gujjar house

=== Languages ===
They converse in the Van Gujjari dialect of the Gujari language. The Van Gujjars are multilingual, as Gujari is their native language facilitated by different levels of proficiency in Hindi, Urdu, and English.

=== Art and craft ===
==== Bead jewellery ====
The process of making bead jewelry is an important craft done by the Van Gujjars. Tribal handicraft centers have allowed the Van Gujjars to design and make many products, from jewelry to decorative and more functional products, such as rope for cattle and brooms made of grass. This demonstrates their artistry, where functional items are designed with artistry. There are a total of five handicraft centers in Uttarakhand that were established to support their art and culture.

Examining the Van Gujjar women's processes of bead jewelry making through a feminist lens can deepen the understanding of their cultural practice and roles. Jewelry has a long human history and among Van Gujjar people, it makes sense that women commonly wear semi-precious beads jewellery that is light and portable. Most of the jewelry ornamentation is crafted using beads, and persists as tradition, and may even exist from pre-Islamic ornamentation.

==== Kaintha jewellery ====
Van Gujjar women have adroitly sewn beads into traditional ornamentation including the Kaintha vibrant area exotic jettison area genetic kinetic, kinetic energetic kinetic, and kinetic jewelry. This craft is a method of creativity and identity as well as connecting them to past generations. Young Van Gujjar girls enjoy the challenge of developing elaborate Kaintha pieces, using colorful beads and devising elaborate designs and patterns. Selecting beads skillfully and blending into Kaintha jewellery is part art.

=== Festivals ===
The Van Gujjars keep all major Islamic festivals such as Eid al-Fitr, Eid al-Adha, Ramadan, Eid Milad un-Nabi and Muharram as per the general practices of Muslim community.

=== Sela Parv ===
Sela Parv is a special festival for the Van Gujjar community, which is held every year in July from the 20th to the 30th across three North Indian states: Uttar Pradesh, Himachal Pradesh and Uttarakhand."Sela" means green in Gujjari language and "parv" means feast day. Sela Parv is a festival that is a celebration of tree plantations alongside cultural festivities, and reflects their deep-seated relationship with nature.

== Population ==
The Van Gujjar community's population figures have not been documented in any Indian census reports yet. According to CFM (City Forest Management plan) for Dehradun, the Van Gujjar population in Dehradun district of Uttarakhand was around 3,072 in 1931, growing to approximately 5,500 by 1991.

Their population in Uttarakhand state is estimated to be 70,000.

In the north Indian states of Haryana, Punjab and Uttar Pradesh their population is roughly estimated to be 80,000, and they live in settled villages in these states.

There are 9,784 van Gujjars in Himachal Pradesh mainly found in the Chamba and Kangra districts of the state.

== Social status ==
The Social status of the Van Gujjars varies by location; In Himachal Pradesh and Jammu and Kashmir they are classified as Scheduled Tribes (ST).

While in Uttar Pradesh and Uttarakhand they are classified as Other Backward classes (OBC).

=== Demands for ST status ===
In Uttar Pradesh and Uttarakhand they demanded for the ST status but not yet given by the states governments. In 1994 a Non-governmental organization (NGO) argued that the Uttar Pradesh Government had recommended Scheduled Tribe status for the Van Gujjars in 1994. The state government's letter to the National Government of India was in response to the NGO'S advocacy efforts, which aimed to secure ST status for the Van Gujjars in Uttar Pradesh. Despite the efforts, Van Gujjar community still awaits recognition as a Scheduled tribe.

In March 2013, Van Gujjar community in Uttarakhand made a demand for Scheduled Tribe (ST) recognition, giving the state government a one-month deadline to issue a resolution in their favor, but their demand is still not accepted by the state government.

== Relocation ==
In 1979 nearly 1,393 Van Gujjar families were relocated from the Rajaji National Park to Gaindikhata about 15 years ago, yet around 1,610 families remain living inside the National Park.

In March 2000, over 400 Van Gujjar families had been relocated to Pathri and Gaindikhata, two rehabilitation sites located near Haridwar district, outside the Rajaji National Park.

In 2012 the Uttarakhand Of Government relocated around 1,200 Van Gujjar families from the Jim Corbett and Rajaji Tiger reserves. Breaking it down, 181 families from the Jim Corbett National Park received land and other facilities as promised, while 84 families didn't get anything. Another 154 families only got land, but no other facilities. Around 157 Van families were relocated from the Sonanadi Wildlife Sanctuary. Meanwhile, 878 families from Rajaji National Park were shifted to Gaindi Khata in Uttarakhand.

In 2016, around 1,400 Van Gujjar families from Rajaji National Park in Rishikesh were shifted into single-room dwellings located near the Beatles Ashram, which lies outside their traditional social and cultural environment.

== Economy ==
The economy of the Van Gujjars revolves around animals, forest resources, and the trade of milk and dairy products. They convert utmost of their milk into adulation and ghee due to limited request access in the high- altitude areas, dealing these products to dealers as they descend to the foothills. Their frugality heavily relies on milk product, dairy products and furnishing high- quality indigenous buffalo seed to native people in Uttarakhand.

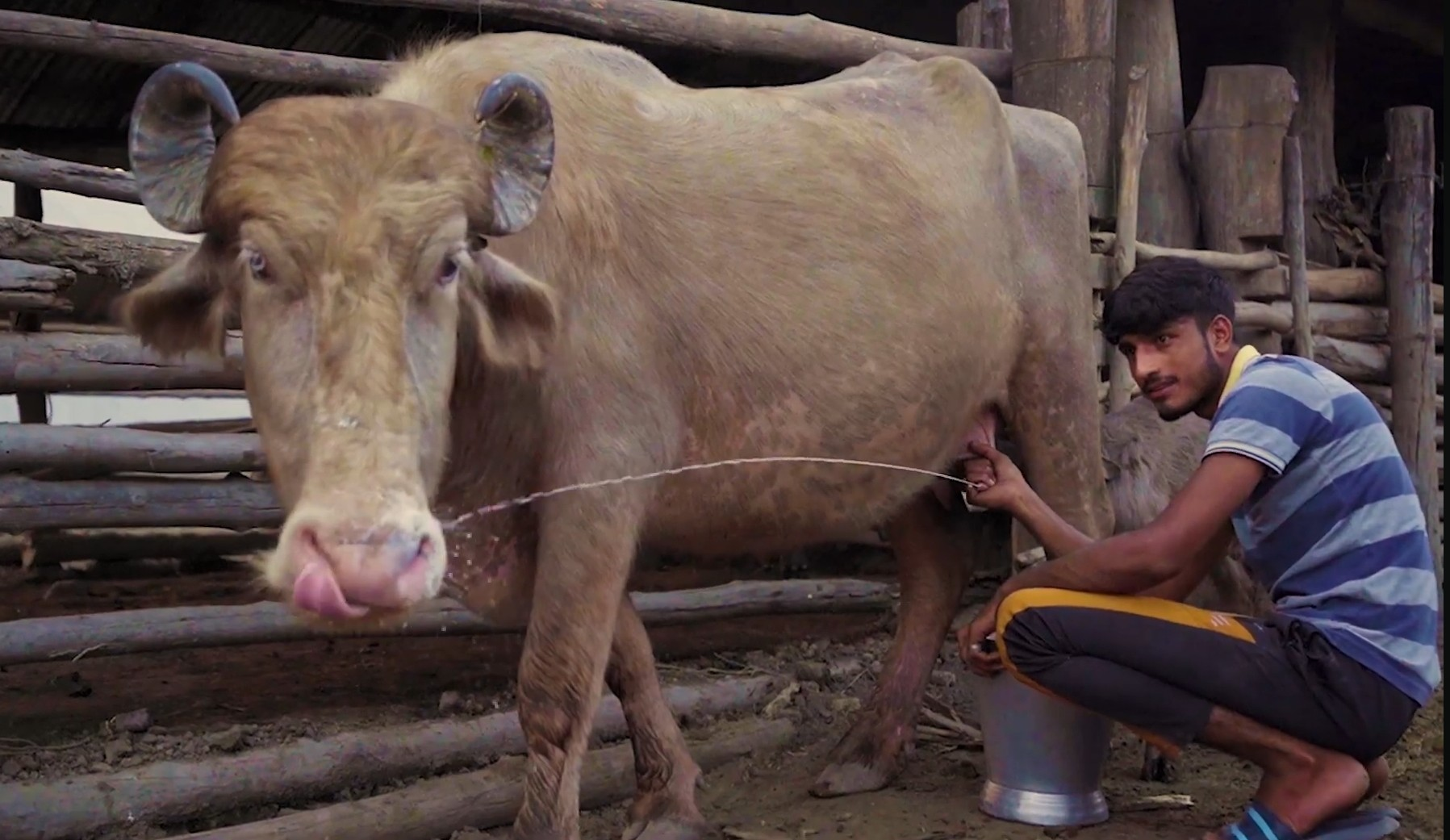
A Van Gujjar milking buffalo

The Van Gujjars primary livelihood is dairy husbandry, which contribute for 80.6% for their income. Labor employment was second largest contributor, making up 13.9% of their total earnings. Selling of Non-Timber Forest Products (NTFPs) contributed 4.2%, while agrarian product played a lower part, contributing 1.4% to their overall income.

== Literacy rate and education ==
Van Gujjar community struggles with education due to numerous challenges. Only a small portion (23.13) have completed primary education, and the hustler rate is bogarting high. The fugitive life of Van Gujjars is characterized by frequent migration between summer and time-out ranges (constantly 50– 300 km piecemeal), making it truly delicate for children to pierce harmonious, quality education, contributing to low enrollment and high hustler rates.

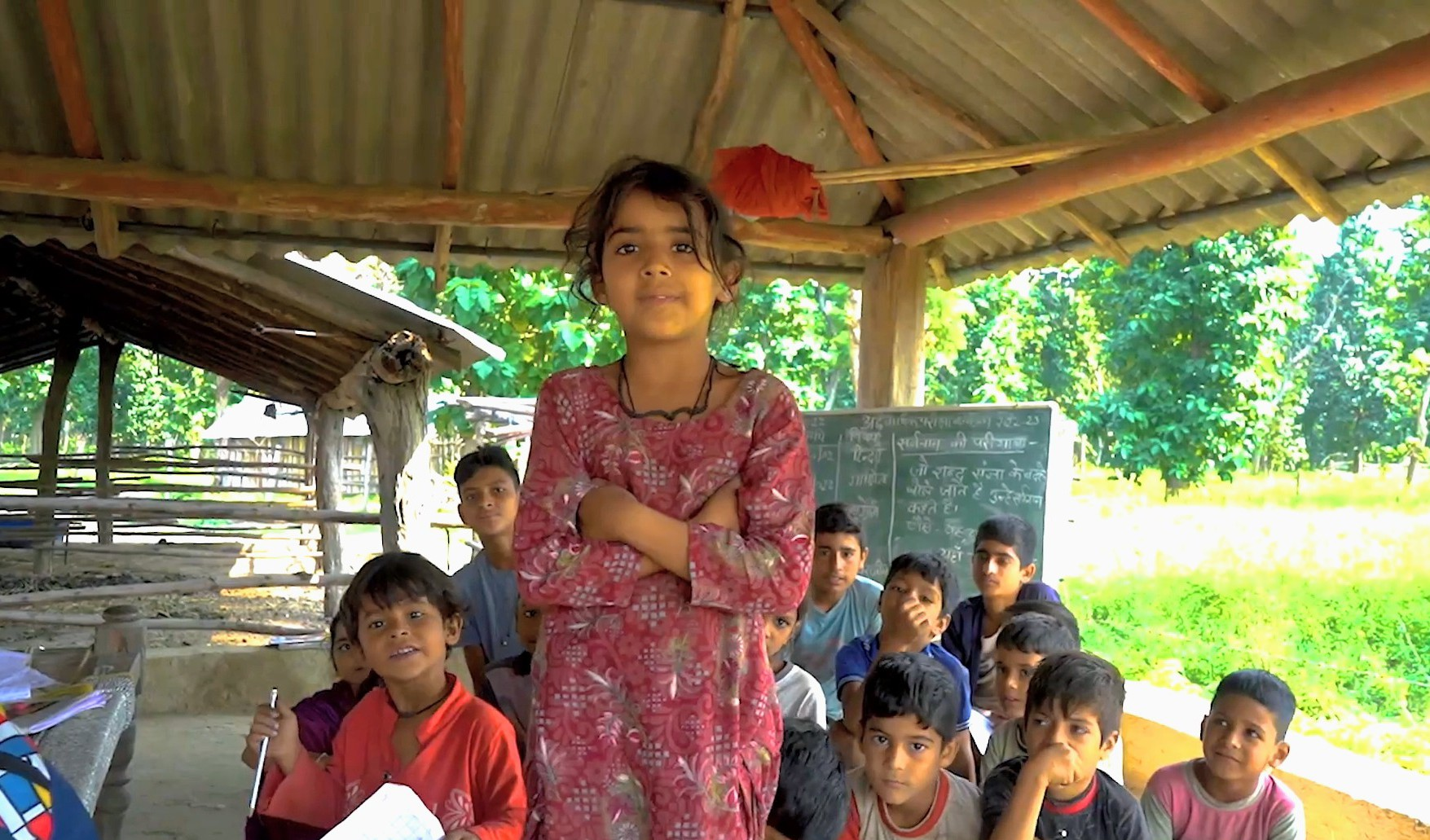
A group of Van Gujjar children studying

Various associations worked to help and promote education in Van Gujjars. Rural Litigation & Entitlement Kendra's (RLEK) education program for the Van Gujjar community was a pioneering action. This program stands out due to its flexible approach, accommodating the community's emigrant patterns and allowing for continuous education. According RLEK's over 21,000 Van Gujjars have gained knowledge chops, which have enhanced their traditional livelihoods.

In 2015 to 2016 the Right of Children to Free and Compulsory Education Act enabled the establishment of Non-Domestic Special Training Centers in select Van Gujjars agreements, including Kunau Chaud, to give formal education to children of the Van community.

== Politics ==
The 1950s and 1960s were the important years for Van Gujjar politics. Rehabilitation enterprise thrust the" Gujjar question" into the public spotlight, expanding its compass beyond timber administration. As a result, Gujjar communities in Jammu and Kashmir, Himachal Pradesh and Uttar Pradesh engaged more constantly with politicians. This new dynamic enabled them to state grievances through government channels, submitting solicitations to quarter adjudicators and advanced authorities. In themid- 1970s, during a conflict in the Rupin- Supin area of U.P (now Uttarakhand), Van Gujjar leaders sought help from the Uttar Pradesh Government, knowing they would find a sympathetic cult noteworthy was the support they entered in 1994.

Van Gujjars are increasingly asserting their political presence, with their voting power and influence growing. Original village leaders now concentrate on issues of Van Gujjars. In a recent Panchayat election in Uttar Pradesh, a Van Gujjar candidate, Abdul Kareem ran alongside 12 others in the Geneshpur Mohand village Panchayat. Van Gujjar community madly campaigned for their candidate, and although their candidate did n't win, they gained precious experience from the election process.

== Gallery ==
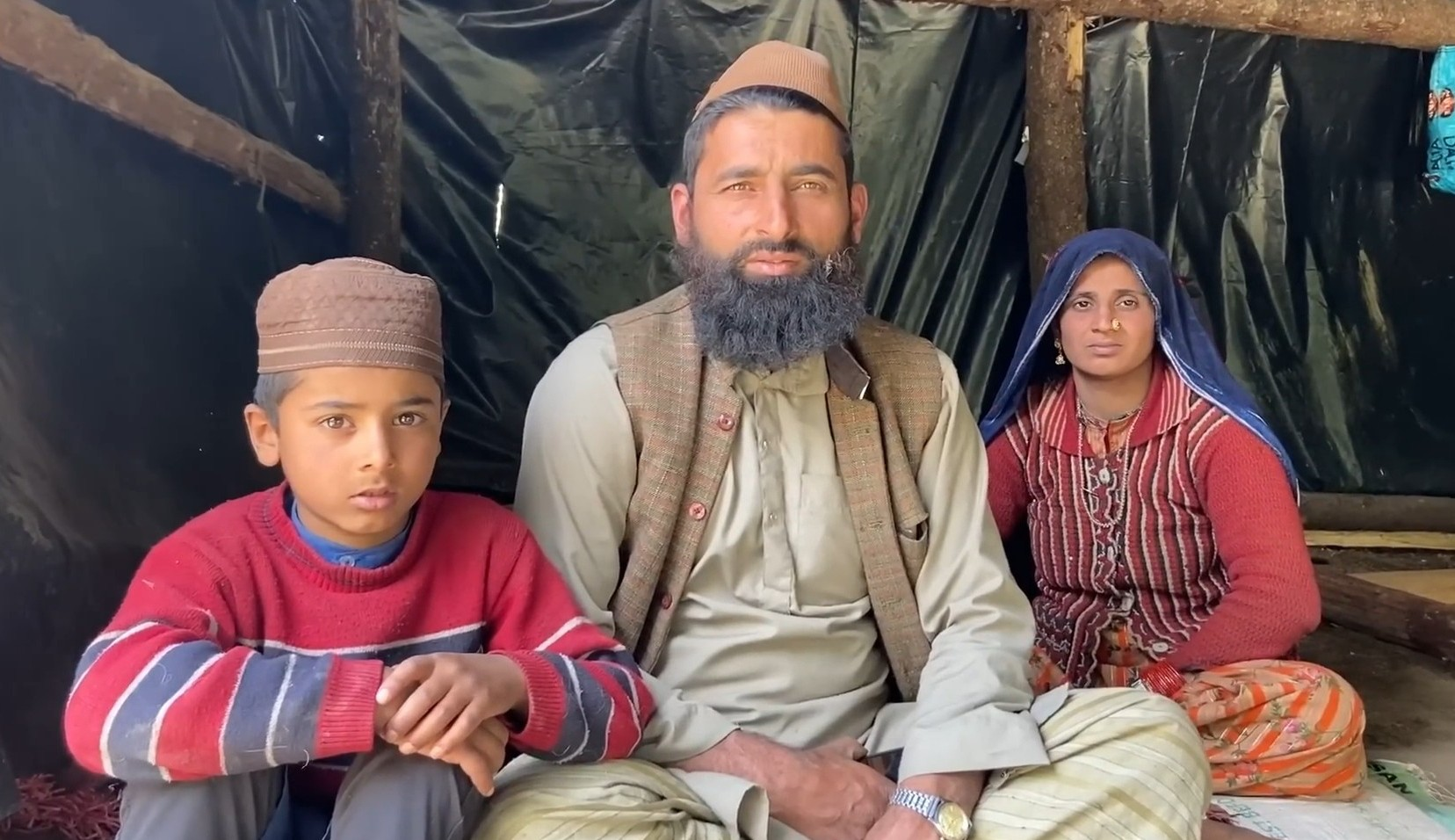
A Muslim Van Gujjar family

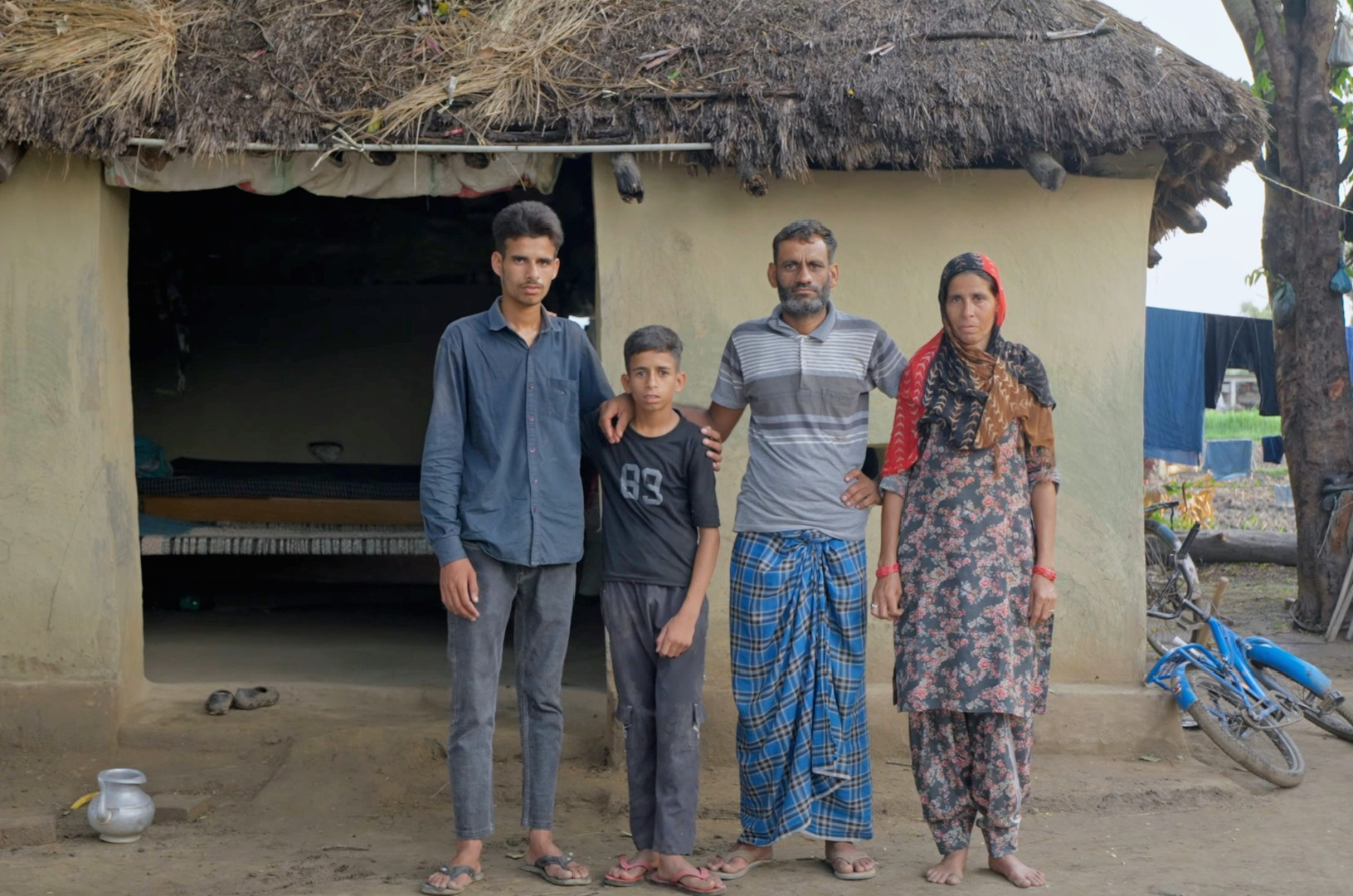
A Van Gujjar family from Uttarakhand

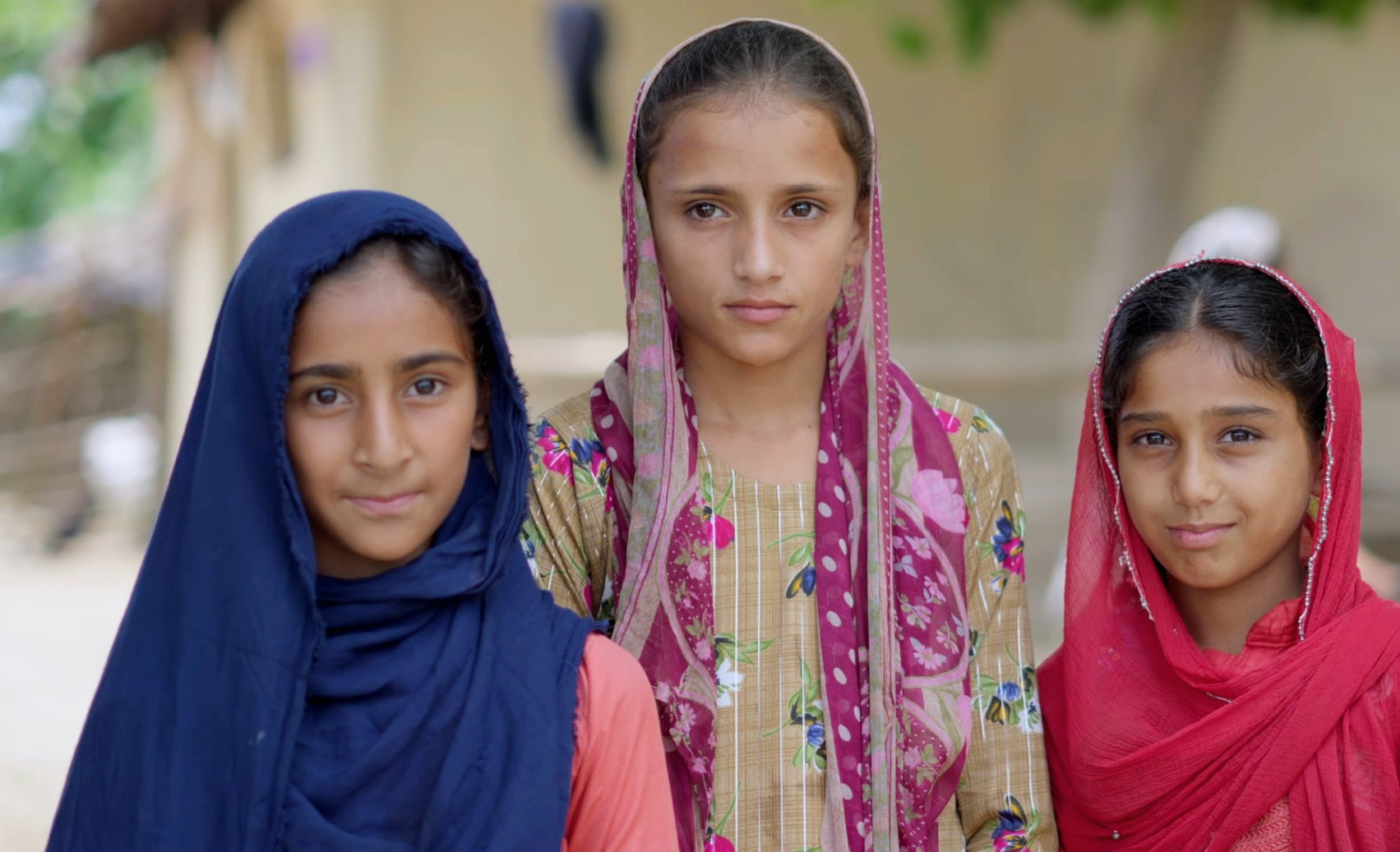
Three Van Gujjar girls

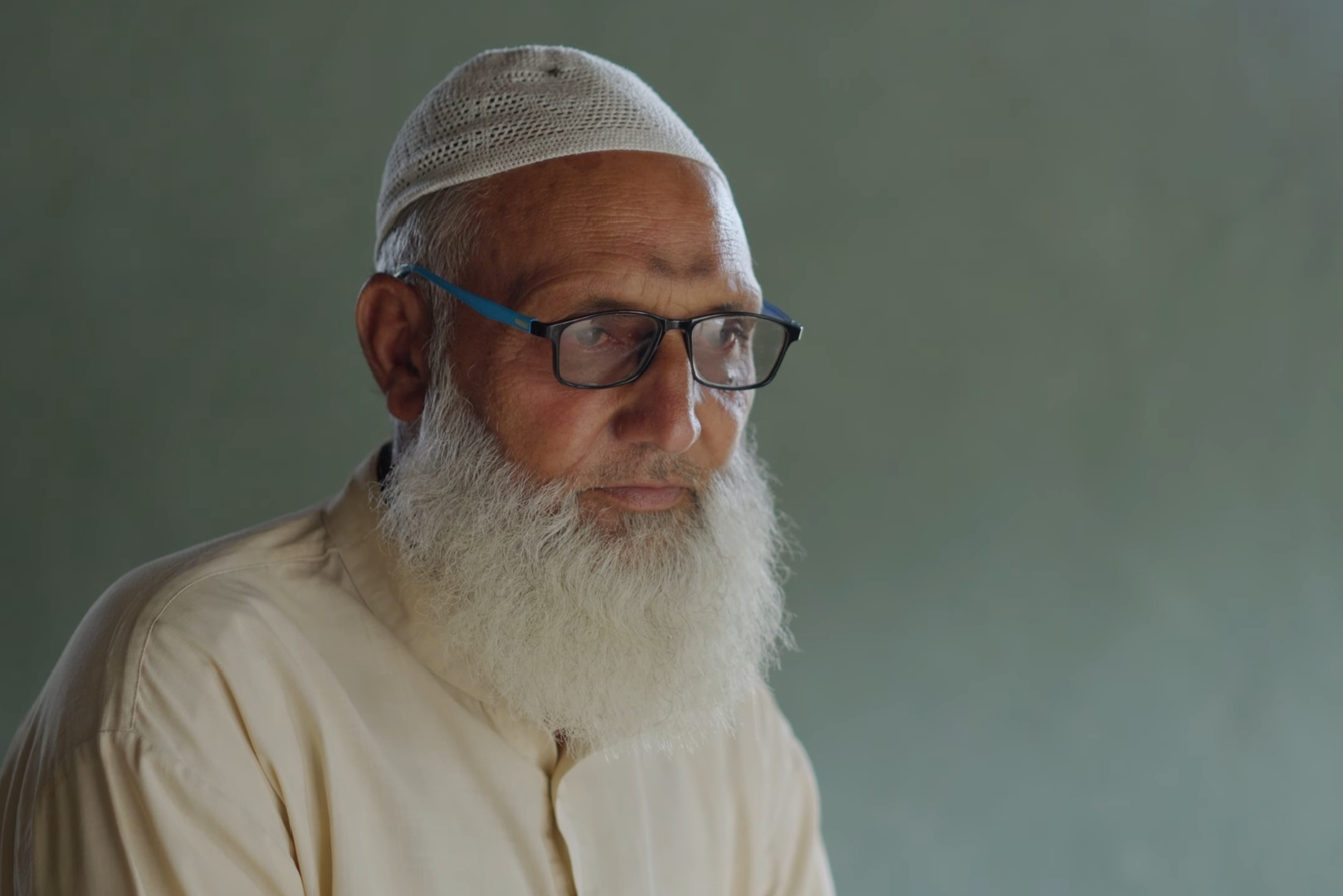
An old Van Gujjar man

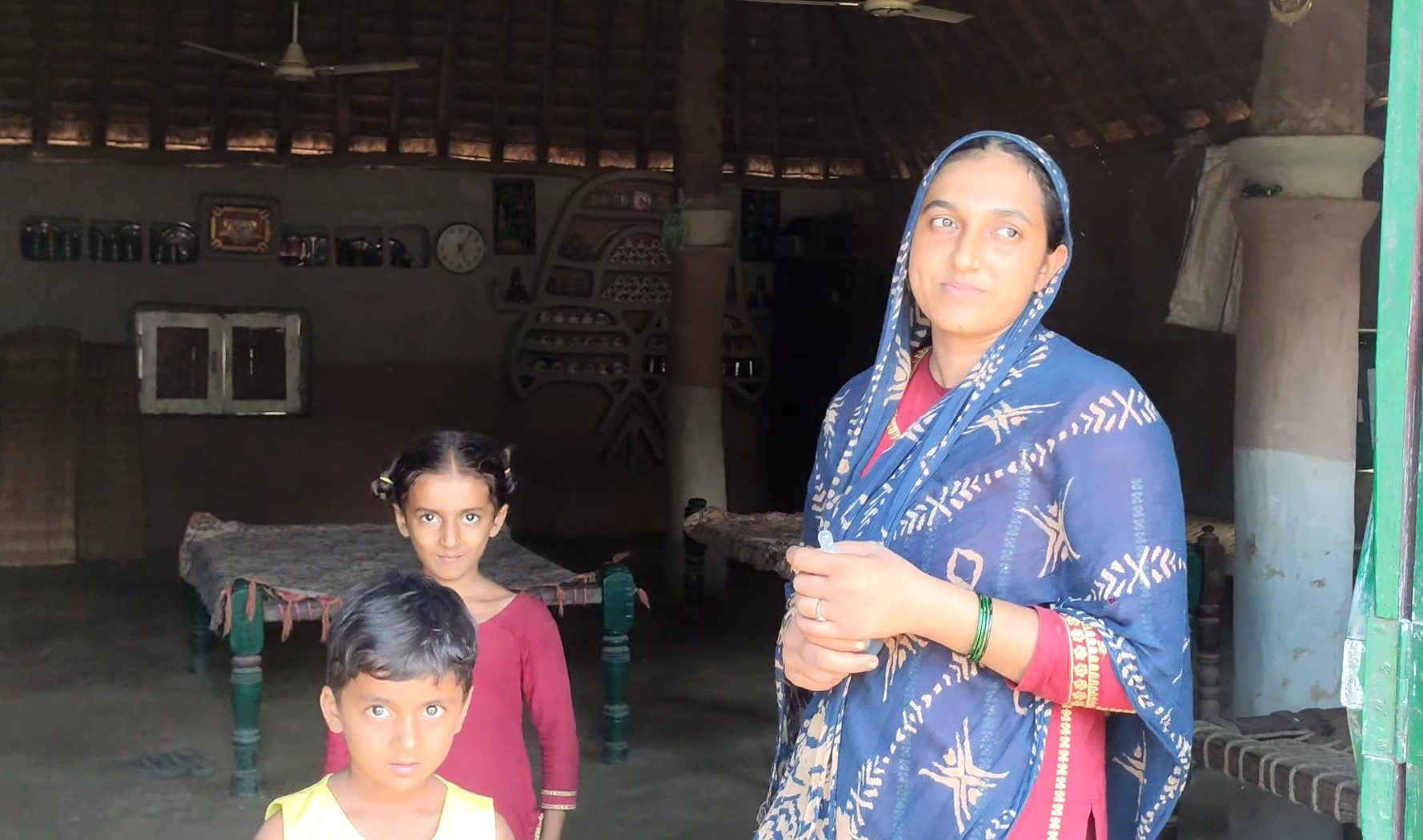
Van Gujjar woman with her children

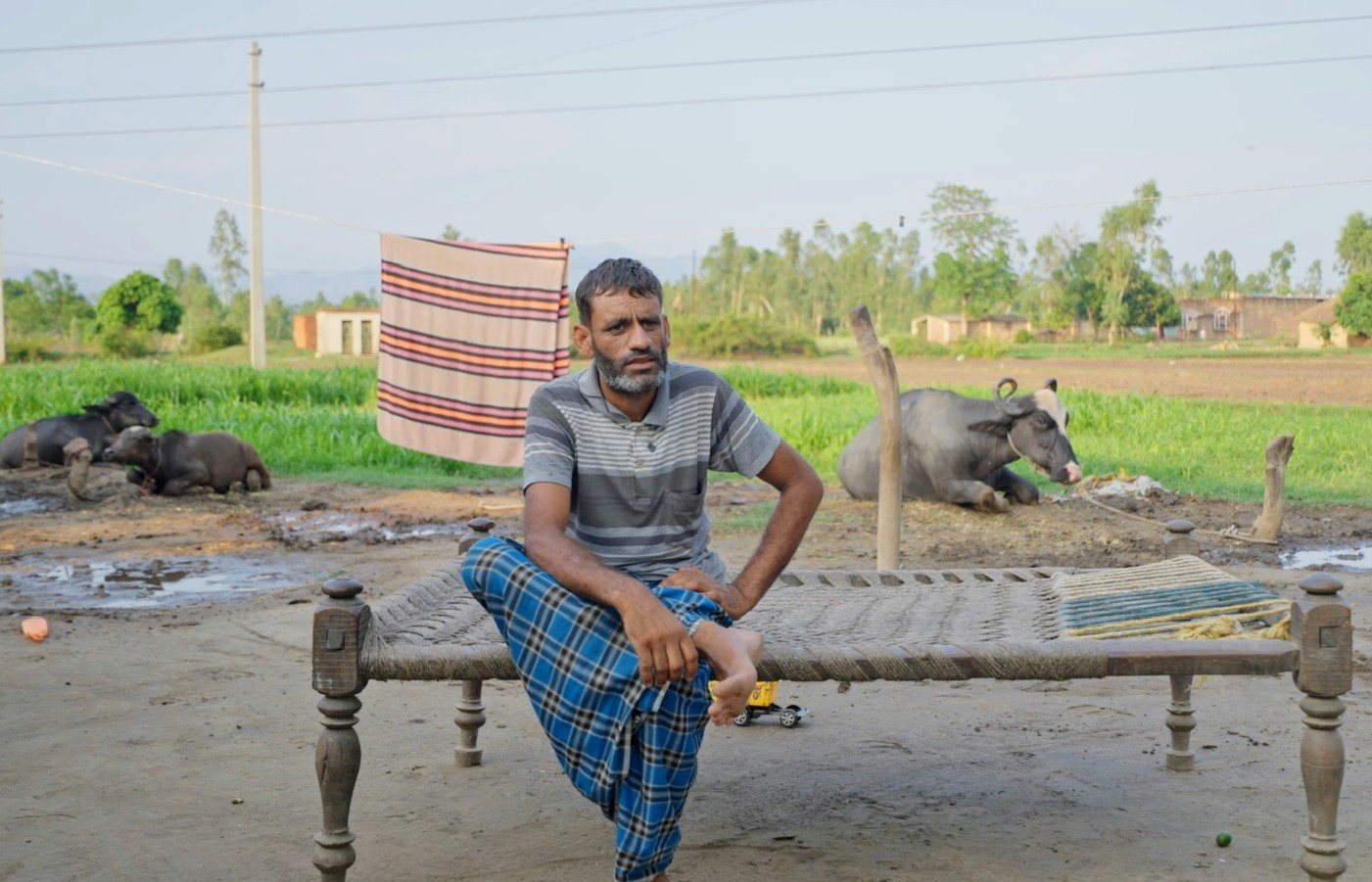

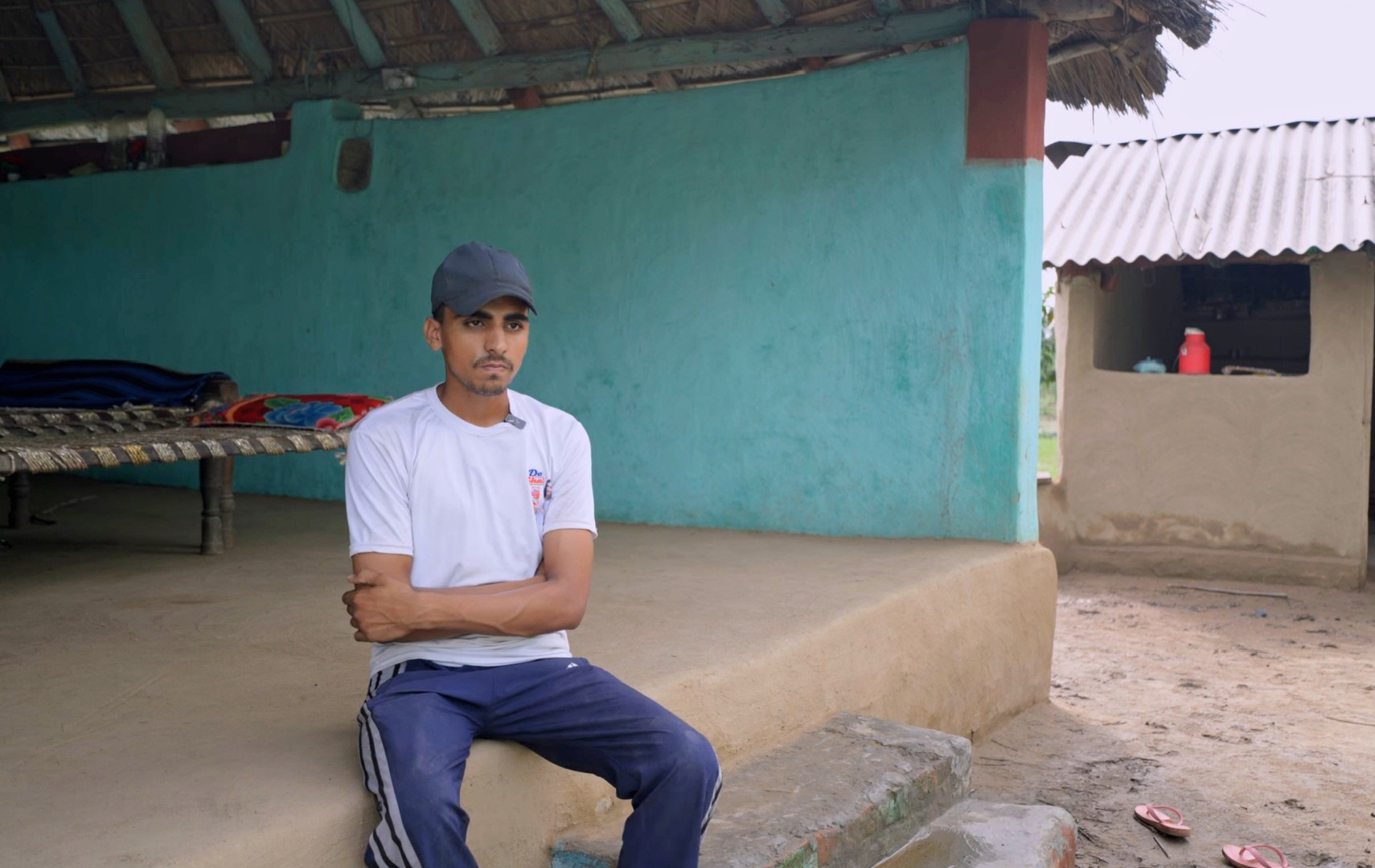
A young Van Gujjar man sitting on floor

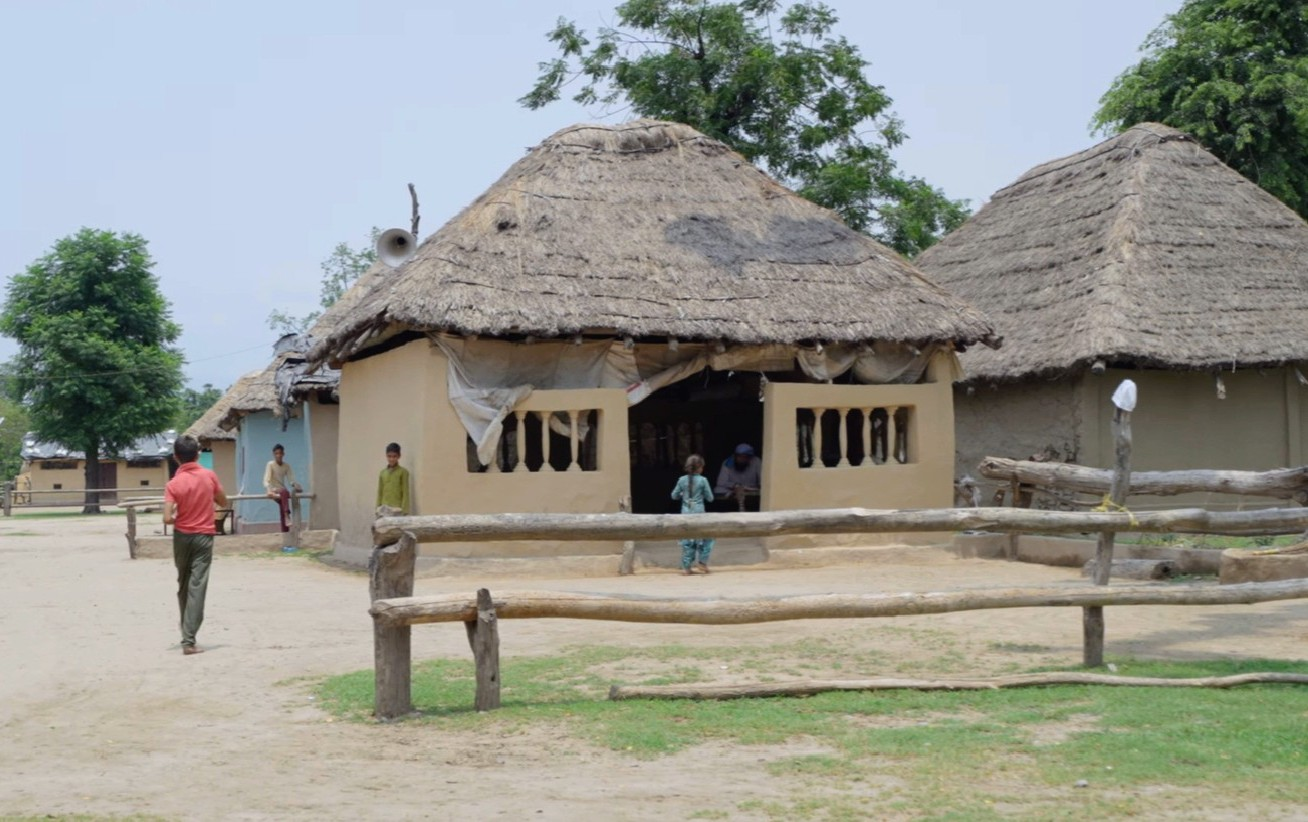
A typical Van Gujjar house

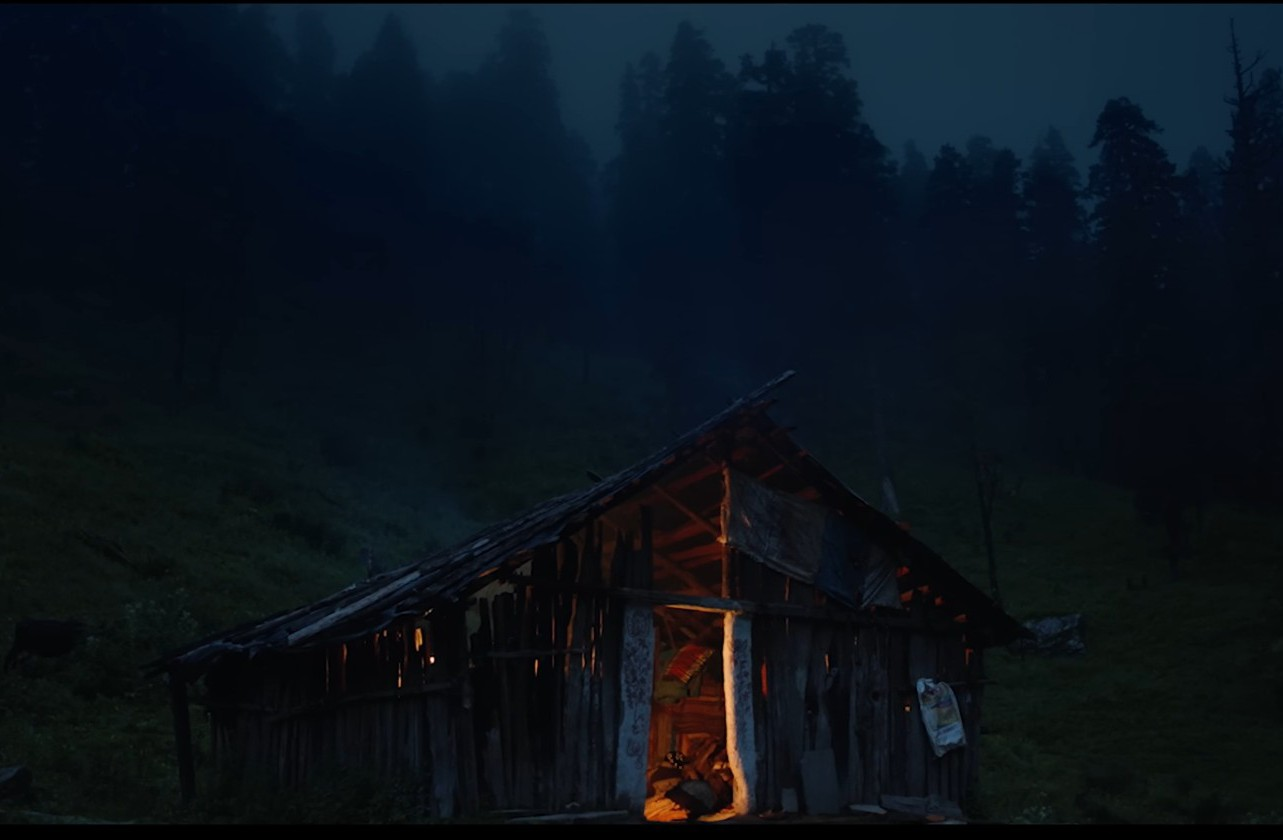
Van Gujjar house in at night

== Bibliography ==
- Khosla, A. (2005). Following the rhythms: transition and tradition of the Van Gujjars of the western Himalayas. International Centre for Integrated Mountain Development.
- Amir, Zeba; De Meulder, Bruno (2 January 2023). "Contested forests: The Van Gujjars' struggle to settle". Journal of Landscape Architecture. 18 (1): 30–39. Bibcode:2023JLaAr..18a..30A. doi:10.1080/18626033.2023.2258722. ISSN 1862-6033.
- Singh, David Emmanuel (2012). Islamization in Modern South Asia: Deobandi Reform and the Gujjar Response. Boston: Walter de Gruyter. ISBN 978-1-61451-185-4.
- Wright, Alice; Thrusfield, Michael (1 January 2016). "Perceptions of zoonotic and animal diseases in the Van Gujjar community of North India". Preventive Veterinary Medicine. 123: 143–153. doi:10.1016/j.prevetmed.2015.11.012. ISSN 1873-1716. PMID 26718054.
- Kumari, Pushpa (13 July 2012). Gender Analysis in Dairy Farming Practices among Van Gujjars in India: A research Study in Hardwar District of Uttarakhand. India: LAP LAMBERT Academic Publishing. ISBN 978-3659114854.
- Samajdar, Tanmay; Chander, Mahesh (December 2011). Forest Based Dairy Husbandry Practices of Van Gujjars. Lap Lambert Academic Publishing GmbH KG. ISBN 978-3-8473-2535-2.
- Gooch, Perniile (2004). "Van Gujjar: The Persistent Forest Pastoralists". Nomadic Peoples. 8 (2): 125–135. doi:10.3167/082279404780446140. ISSN 0822-7942. JSTOR 43123728.
- Srivastava, Raghav (2022). "The making of pastoralisms: An account of the Gaddis and Van Gujjars in the Indian Himalaya". Pastoralism: Research, Policy and Practice. 12 (1) 42. Bibcode:2022Pasto..12...42S. doi:10.1186/s13570-022-00259-z. ISSN 2041-7136. PMC 9590384. PMID 36311345.
- Nusrat, Rubina (November 2015). "'Unheard Voices of Van Gujjar Women': A Thematic Analysis of Coping Patterns by Women in the Context of Sedentarization among Himalayan Pastoralists". Sociology and Anthropology. 3 (11): 598–607. doi:10.13189/sa.2015.031104. Archived from the original on 30 April 2025.
- Chattopadhyaya, Brajadulal (1994). The Making of Early Medieval India. Oxford University Press. ISBN 9780195634150.
