= Gurjars in Uttarakhand =

Ethnic group in Uttarakhand, India

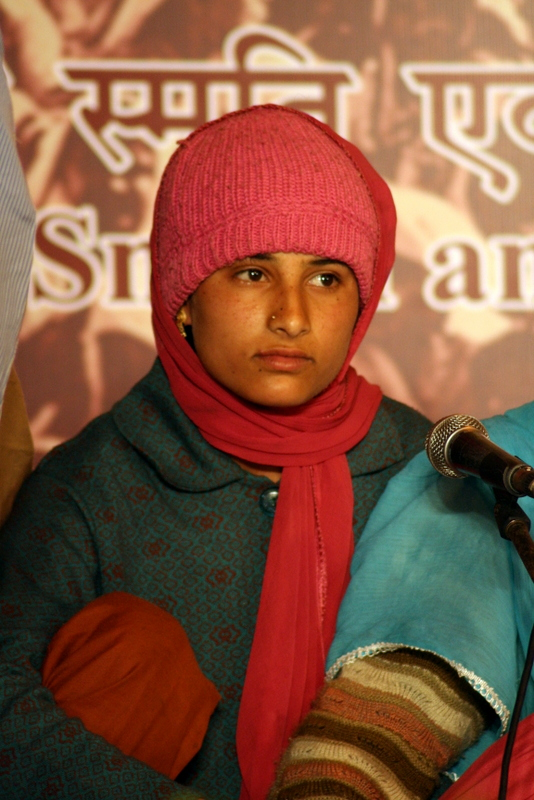
- Gurjar tribal girl from Uttarakhand

Regions with significant populations
- (India) Uttarakhand

Languages
- Gujari, Garhwali, Kumaoni, Urdu, Hindi

Religion
- • Majority: Sunni Islam • Minority: Hinduism

Related ethnic groups
- Gurjar, Muslim Gurjars, Van Gurjars

Gurjars in Uttarakhand are an community native to the Indian state of Uttarakhand. They are mainly found in the Garhwal and Kumaon divisions and scattered across almost all districts of Uttarakhand; they are densely populated in Dehradun, Haridwar, Nainital, Pauri Garhwal, Uttarkashi, Tehri Garhwal and Almora districts, while Pithoragarh district has the smallest Gurjar population. In the 1931 census of India, 63.21% of Gurjars in present-day Uttarakhand state were Muslims, while the remaining 36.79% were Hindus.

Hindu Gurjars in the state have traditionally been settled, with some being nomads, while Muslim Gurjars are mainly nomads with some settled communities. Amongst the nomadic Muslim Gurjar communities Van Gujjar is a major subgroup.

== History ==
It is generally believed that Gurjars initially moved to the Kumaon and Garhwal regions between the mid 18th and 19th-century, which are now part of Uttarakhand.

Many scholars believe Gurjars came to these regions 150 or 200 years ago from Jammu region of Kashmir. Gurjars are believed to have migrated to Garhwal, via Himachal Pradesh, looking for grasslands for their livestock. They first moved to Uttarakhand, around the same time as the Rajputs.

Phoda Singh and Lal Karan Singh from the Chokar clan of Gurjars are said to have established the Timli State in Dehradun in the 15th-century. The state was ruled by their dynasty until it was annexed by Mughals. Their family ruled until the Mughals took over. Later, in 1548, they again took control, founded Timli town and ruled it. Bhagwan Singh, a notable king from the same family, even controlled prices in north India. When took over some areas in Dehradun, Timli State remained independent. After Bhagwan Singh's death, his daughter Satyaditi ruled the state.

During the 1700s, Gurjar and Sikh raiders repeatedly attacked the Doon Valley. In 1775, Sikhs raided the area, looting settlements, killing residents, and setting places on fire. But raiders from the Saharanpur, both Gurjars and Rajputs, caused worse damage in the valley than the Sikhs did. In the late 1800s, the Jaunsar-Bawar forest division in Dehradun district was a key spot for nomadic Gurjars. It connected nearby regions, and when summer came, Gurjars would gather there to head to highland pastures with their cattle. Some stayed there for summer, while others moved on to other areas.

The Panwar Gurjars ruled the Landaura State (containing more than 600 villages) from the Landaura town of Haridwar district for about 375 years. In 1759–60, the Mughal governor gave Nahar Singh, a Gurjar leader of Panwar clan rights to collect revenue in the area of Landaura. Many Gurjars joined him, and he became a powerful local leader. Under Mughal rule, Gurjars traded cattle, paying taxes to the Mughals. Nahar Singh switched sides between Mughals and Sikhs, was imprisoned, and eventually lost part of his land. He later worked with the Mughals to drive out Sikhs. After his death, his son Ram Dayal Singh took over. In 1804, Ram Dayal Singh supported the East India Company during a local rebellion. After his death in 1813, a dispute over leadership was settled when Dhan Kunwar paid off her husband's relative, Badan Singh, to keep control of Landaura state for her infant son, Kushal Singh. In 1824, a relative of Ram Dayal Singh, Vijay Singh Gurjar of the Kunja estate in Dehradun tried to take over but failed and was killed. Kushal Singh died in 1829, followed by his mother Dhan Kunwar in 1849. His son Harbans Singh died young in 1850, leaving behind a baby son, Raghubir Singh.

During the 18th century, the Dehradun valley experienced frequent invasions and changes in control. The Rohilla chief Najib-ud-Daula occupied the valley from 1754 to 1770. This was followed by Sikh raids in 1775 and 1783, which were primarily plundering expeditions. A second Rohilla invasion was led by Ghulam Kadir in 1785, and the Marathas made a brief incursion in 1801. Between 1792 and 1800, the valley was under the rule of the Sirmaur State. During this period of political disorder, with frequent changes in rule due to rivalries among the royal families of Garhwal and Kumaon, Gurjar and Rajput communities took advantage of the instability and raided the Dehradun valley. Historian B.W Pandey notes that in the 18th century, Gurjars and Sikhs raided and occupied the city of Dehradun.

The Government of India relocated around 1,902 Gurjars families from forests areas of Haridwar, Chila, Motichur, Chilawali, Ramghar and Gohri in Rajaji National Park, to Gaindhikhata and Pathri between 1985 and 1998. Another 400 Gurjar families families were relocated from Jim Corbett National Park to Gaindhikhata in March 2000.

== Demographics ==
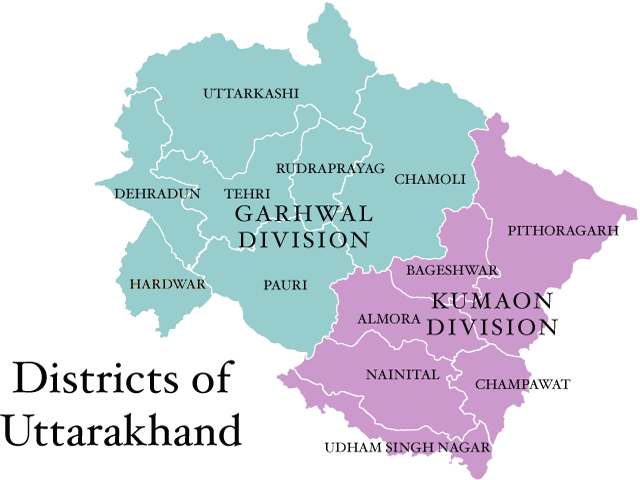
Map of Uttarakhand, showing the districts found in the Garhwal and Kumaon divisions.

Gurjar and Van Gujjars communities are mainly found in the Shivalik, Kalsi, Jim Corbett National Park, Chilla Scantuary, and Rajaji National Park forest areas of Uttarakhand The Tons Valley in the Jaunsar-Bawar region of the Garhwal division and Dehradun, Haridwar, Uttarkashi, Roorkee, Nainital, Almora, Tehri Garhwal, Uttarkashi, and Bageshwar also have large settlements of Gurjars.

The Shivalik region east of Garhwal division has a pastoral area stretching from Kalsi forest to Kotdwar. Gurjars live in many places here, including Gangabhogpur, Gauhari range, Gaendikhata, Dumet, Dhaula Tapad, Pauri Garhwal, Rishikesh, Batoli, Dharmawala, Majri, Kulhal, Simlash, Dudhli, Bhaniyawala, Timli, Kadwapani (Dehradun), Sajanpur, Aamsaut, Katebad, Sherpur, Chidiyapur Rang, South Nlowala, North Nlowala (Haridwar), Shikroda, Khanpur, Laldang, Jakhan, Nastarwari, Dasoywala, Shyampur, Peeli beet, Sidha beet, Mithi beri, Kanswali (Haridwar), Yamuna valley.

== Clan system ==
Some important clans (gotras among Hindus) of the Gurjars of Uttarakhand include:

- Aamre
- Bania (Vania)
- Chauhan
- Chechi
- Kaalas
- Kushan (Kasana)
- Mehsi (Maisi)
- Thikariya
- Dhinda
- Pathan
- Poswal
- Lodha
- Khubar
- Pawar
- Dhape (Dheepe)
- Solanki

== Religion ==
Gurjars in Uttarakhand are divided into two distinct ethnoreligious groups: Hindu Gurjars and Muslim Gurjars. Muslim Gurjars of Uttarakhand predominantly belong to the Sunni sect of Islam.

The Van Gujjars adopted Islam in the 13th to 14th centuries, but other Gurjars of the state mostly adopted Islam in the 17th century.

In the 1931 census of India, the total population of Gurjars in the Indian state of Uttarakhand was 2,210, of which 1,397 were Muslims i.e. 63.21% of Gurjars in present-day Uttarakhand state were Muslims, while the remaining 36.79% were Hindus.

== Culture ==
=== Clothing ===
Gurjar men typically wear a turban, loose lungis or kurtas with some adding embroidered waistcoats to their outfit especially in winter. Many also go shoeless like the Dhobi people. Some modern Gurjars wear shirts and cheap rubber shoes.

Gurjar women usually wear a long kurta type shirt, pajamas and a jacket. Women of Hindu and Muslim Gurjars in Uttarakhand typically do not cover their faces or practice purdah system. They wear a hill-styled salwar-kameez, similar to the one worn in the plains, with a shalwar featuring many pleats and small floral prints on a green or blue background. Their attire is very similar to salwar-kameez of Gurjar women of Kashmir. They wear minimal silver jewellery.

=== Festivals ===
Gurjars in Uttarakhand celebrate various regional and religious festivals. Muslim Gurjars celebrate Islamic festivals like Ramazan, Muharram, Eid al-Fitr, and Eid al-Adha, while Hindu Gurjars celebrate Hindu festivals like Diwali and Holi. Muslim Gurjars practice all Islamic festivals and like to pray in mosques on Fridays but can't often afford to go on Hajj. Hindu Gurjars also used to celebrate seasonal festivals like Lohri and Baishakhi, but these aren't common anymore.

=== Housing ===
Tribal Gurjars in the forest areas of Rajaji National Park traditionally live in deras, simple homes made from forest materials. They move in big family groups to find good grazing land and set up temporary homes for the stay.

In the Sivalik Hills, Gurjar winter homes are semi-permanent. They take them apart when moving to higher pastures, but the spots stay the same. The Forest Department takes or auctions off the wood. Gurjars rebuild when they return, often getting materials from the Forest Department. Their homes are usually near water sources like streams, and are named after them (e.g., Munal Sot, Amla Sot).

=== Language ===
In Uttarakhand, they speak various regional languages, including Garhwali, Kumaoni, Hindi, Urdu, and Gujari. The Garhwali and Kumaoni language mainly spoken by Hindu Gurjars in the state. Muslim Gurjars in the state mostly speak Gujari as their mother tongue. In the 2011 census, there were 3,822 Gujari speakers among the Muslim Gurjars in Uttarakhand.

=== Marriages ===
Gurjars practice various marriage customs in Uttarakhand. Hindu Gurjars mostly practice polyandry marriages. Muslim Gujars practice cousins marriages and exchange marriages (where families swap a boy and a girl).

==== Monogamy ====
Most Gurjars are monogamous, having one wife at a time. Islam allowed maximum four marriages for Muslim Gurjars, but they still prefer one marriage. More common is remarrying after a wife dies or divorces. If a Gurjar guy has multiple wives, they often live separately with their kids, and he splits time with them.

==== Exchange marriages ====
Muslim Gurjars in Uttarakhand often choose exchange marriages, where two families swap kids (a son and daughter from one family marry a daughter and son from another). This way, they avoid paying bride price or dowry, keeping their animals and wealth within the families.

==== Widow-remarriage ====
Gurjars allow window remarriage, but the new husband might have to pay the dead man's family. Hindu Gurjars often practice junior levirate (marrying the window to her husband's brother). Buffaloes are exchanged as bride-price or dowry, but money's becoming more common now. If a couple sets up their own home after a service marriage, the girl's father usually gives them some buffaloes.

==== Service marriage ====
Gurjars also practice "service marriage". A guy works for a family with a daughter, and if they like him, he gets to marry her. Poor guys without sisters often choose this option, avoiding bride price or dowry.

==== Ghar Jamai ====
Gurjars sometimes do 'ghar jamai' marriages. A rich Gurjar with a daughter brings a guy to live with them and marries him to her. The couple lives with the girl's family.

== Population ==
The 1931 census of British India, the last census record caste in detail, counted 2,210 Gurjars in various districts of present-day Indian state of Uttarakhand.

Historical population
Year	Pop.	±% p.a.
1891	997	—
1901	1,250	+2.29%
1911	2,148	+5.56%
1921	2,609	+1.96%
1931	2,210	−1.65%
source: 1891 census - 1901 census - 1911 census - 1921 census - 1931 census

The current Muslim Van Gurjar population in the state is estimated to be around 70,000 while the number of Hindu Gurjars are not known.

== Affirmative action ==
In Uttarakhand Hindu Gurjars are socially classified as Other Backwards classes (OBC) in the state. However, Muslim Gurjars in state are not included in the OBC list.

In 2012, the Government of Uttarakhand promised to give Schedule Tribe (ST) status to Gurjars of Uttarakhand and Muslim Van Gujjars, but this promise hasn't been fulfilled. The Van Gujjars, a semi-nomadic pastoral community, have been fighting for this recognition, which would grant them rights to forest land and other benefits.

== Occupations and income ==
Many people in Uttarakhand were herders, farmers, or both. They mainly raised cattle, which was a big part of their economy. Some groups in Uttarakhand like the Gurjars and Bhotiyas, relied entirely on livestock. In Uttarakhand tribal Gurjars earn around Rs. 4,500 monthly per family (Rs. 450 per person), but they're stuck in debt. This debt is a big obstacle to improving their lives. They can't move forward or change how they live until they pay off what they owe.

== Traditional medicine ==
Gurjars in Uttarakhand have good knowledge about animal diseases. They've kept their traditional remedies alive. In the past, vets were scarce, but now there are more options in towns like Dehradun and Haridwar. Still, Gurjars usually try their own treatments first, turning to vets only if that doesn't work.

According to a 2010 study, in the Garhwal region of Uttarakhand, the Gurjar community has been reported to use medicinal plants to treat some diseases of livestock and humans: a paste of Cayratia trifolia and Dioscorea bulbifera for worm-infested wounds, root paste of Achyranthes aspera for fever, and crushed Allium sativum bulbs mixed with fodder for dysentery.

== Notable ==
- Pranav Singh, Indian politician from Haridwar district, titular ruler of Landaura
- Kartar Singh Bhadana, Indian politician

== Bibliography ==
- Rawat, Ajay Singh (1994). Gujjars - the forest dwellers of sub Himalayan Tarai. Nehru Memorial Museum and Library.
- Dalal, Brinda (1996-01-30). Gujjars in Garhwal. Parallel lives: situational identity and exchange (Thesis). Vol. 1. University of Cambridge. doi:10.17863/CAM.31076.
- Joshi, Ritesh (2012). "Gujjar community resettlement from Rajaji National Park, Uttarakhand, India". Conservation Evidence. Ministry of Environment And Forest, Government of India.
- Singh, Shyam (2010-03-01). "Socio-economic aspects of the Van Gujjars -A tribal community of Pathri forest of Uttarakhand". Journal of Non-Timber Forest Products. 17 (1): 45–48. doi:10.54207/bsmps2000-2010-9TM0A0. ISSN 0971-9415.
- Śarmā, Devīdatta (2009). Cultural History of Uttarakhand. D.K. Printworld. ISBN 978-8124604342.
