= Van Gujjari =

Language variety of Gujjari language

- گُوجَری; वन गुज्जरी
- Ornithologist Taukeer Alam introducing himself in Van Gujjari
- Native to: India, Nepal, and elsewhere
- Ethnicity: Van Gurjars
- Language family: Indo-European: Indo-Iranian; Indo-Aryan; Western; Rajasthani–Marwari; Rajasthani; Gujari; Van Gujjari
- Writing system: Takri, Perso-Arabic script, Devanagari

Language codes
- ISO 639-3: –
- Glottolog: east2311

Van Gujjari or Van Gujari is a dialect of Gujari and the native language of Van Gujjars of north India. They mostly live in the Sivalik Hills and Bhabar regions of in Uttarakhand, and as well in the Tarai region of Uttarakhand and Uttar Pradesh in India, and in Nepal. Van Gujjari has influence of Dogri and Punjabi languages. By 2024, over 170 children's books has been translated into Van Gujjari to teach young children. Conservationist Taukeer Alam has published three books covering the traditional knowledge and literature of the Van Gujjar community in Van Gujjari.

== Calendar ==
Van Gujari calendar	English calendar
Mannu	January
Faghan	February
Chhetar	March
Besakh	April
Jeth	May
Aar / Ār	June
Saman / Sāman	July
Padhron	August
Assu	September
Katiyaro	October
Mangher	November
Pow	December

== See also ==
- Van Gujjar people
- Gurjars in Uttarakhand

== Bibliography ==
- Alam, Taukeer (April 2024). Vana Gujjarī Kahāniyāṃ. Maee.
- Alam, Taukeer (April 2024). Vana Gujjarī Hindī Śabdakośa. Maee.
- Alam, Taukeer (April 2024). Vana Gujjarī Baiṃta: Vana Gujjarī Gīta. Maee.
- Alam, Taukeer (April 2024). Bajarāta Te Khvāna: Vana Gujjarī Paheliyām̐ Aura Lokokatiyām̐. Maee.
