= Provincial Forest Service =

Provincial Forest Service may refer to:

- Provincial Forest Service (Uttar Pradesh)
- Provincial Forest Service (Uttarakhand)

== See also ==
- Provincial Civil Service (disambiguation)
- Provincial Police Service (disambiguation)
