= Provincial Police Service =

Provincial Police Service may refer to:

- Provincial Police Service (Uttar Pradesh)
- Provincial Police Service (Uttarakhand)

== See also ==
- Provincial Civil Service
- Provincial Forest Service
