= Provincial Civil Service =

Provincial Civil Service may refer to:

- Provincial Civil Service (Jharkhand)
- Provincial Civil Service (Uttar Pradesh)
- Provincial Civil Service (Uttarakhand)

== See also ==
- Provincial Police Service (disambiguation)
- Provincial Forest Service (disambiguation)
