= Uttarakhand Public Service Commission =

Indian state government agency

- Abbreviation: UKPSC
- Formation: 15 May 2001; 25 years ago
- Type: Government agency
- Location: Gurukul Kangri, Haridwar, Uttarakhand
- Region served: Uttarakhand, India
- Chairperson: Lt. Gen. Gajendra Joshi (Retd.)
- Website: psc.uk.gov.in

The Uttarakhand Public Service Commission (UKPSC) is a government agency of the state of Uttarakhand, India, responsible for the recruitment of candidates for various state government jobs through competitive examinations.

== Structure ==
The Uttarakhand Public Service Commission has been constituted under the provisions of Article 315 of the Constitution of India by the Governor of Uttarakhand vide notification no. 247/1 Personnel 2001 dated 14 March 2001 (Annexure 1). The commission came into existence on 15 May 2001.

The sanctioned strength of the Commission is the Chairperson and six Members (Annexure). The functioning of the Uttarakhand Public Service Commission is governed by the Uttarakhand Public Service Commission Procedure and Conduct of Business Rules 2013, under section 11 of the State Public Service Commission (Regulation of Procedure) Act, 1985 Uttarakhand Adaptation and Modification Order, 2002.

== Examinations conducted ==
List of Examinations Conducted by the Uttarakhand Public Service Commission time to time. (Direct recruitment through interviews only as per the service rules of various posts)

1. Combined State/Upper Subordinate Examination
2. Combined State/Lower Subordinate Examination
3. Review Officer/Assistant Review Officer Examination

Nature of examinations:

- Preliminary Examination – Objective Nature
- Main Examination – Descriptive Nature
- Interview – Oral

== List of chairpersons ==
S. No.	Name	Term of office		
1	N. P. Nawani, IAS (Retd.)	15 May 2001	14 August 2001	91 days
2	K. Arya, IAS (Retd.)	21 September 2001	6 January 2005	3 years, 107 days
3	Lt. Gen. G. S. Negi (Retd.)	7 January 2005	23 November 2006	1 year, 320 days
4	Lt. Gen. Dr. M. C. Bhandari (Retd.)	24 November 2006	11 August 2008	1 year, 261 days
5	S. K. Das, IAS (Retd.)	12 August 2008	2 February 2011	2 years, 174 days
6	Dr. D. P. Joshi	11 May 2011	31 December 2016	5 years, 234 days
7	Prof. (Dr.) Narendra Singh Bisht	2 January 2017	1 January 2018	364 days
8	Maj. Gen. Anand Singh Rawat, (Retd.)	2 January 2018	23 December 2021	3 years, 355 days
9	Dr. Rakesh Kumar, MD, IAS (Retd.)	24 December 2021	11 June 2023	1 year, 169 days
10	Prof. (Dr.) Jagmohan Singh Rana (acting)	12 June 2023	31 October 2023	141 days
11	Dr. Ravi Datt Godiyal (acting)	1 November 2023	29 May 2026	2 years, 209 days
12	Anil Kumar Rana (acting)	30 May 2026	14 July 2026	45 days
13	Lt. Gen. Gajendra Joshi (Retd.)	15 July 2026	Incumbent	110 days

== Controversies ==
The commission was embroiled in a job scam in 2022, when it was revealed that the exam papers of the Patwari exam were leaked by commission officers in collusion with other people. Ironically, the UKPSC had been given responsibility of conducting papers after the Uttarakhand Subordinate Service Selection Commission had been found involved in similar corruption and divested of its powers. A total of 36 candidates were found to have accessed the question bank after section officer Sanjiv Chaturvedi leaked it by sending photos to his wife Ritu, who provided the same to others.

As a result, the paper was rescheduled and papers of other exams were in the process of being redrafted.

== See also ==
- Uttarakhand Subordinate Service Selection Commission
- Provincial Civil Service (Uttarakhand)
- Provincial Police Service (Uttarakhand)
- Provincial Forest Service (Uttarakhand)
- List of public service commissions in India
