= Laldhang =

Laldhang kotdwar
- Town
- Location in Uttarakhand, India Laldhang (India)
- Coordinates: 29.85°N 78.32°E
- Country: India
- State: Uttarakhand
- District: Haridwar
- Elevation: 372 m (1,220 ft)

Languages
  - Official: Hindi
  - Native: Khariboli
- Time zone: UTC+5:30 (IST)
- Telephone code: 01334
- Vehicle registration: UK
- Website: uk.gov.in

Laldhang is a town in Haridwar district of Uttarakhand, 30 km from Haridwar, and 27 km from Kotdwar.

== Geography ==
Laldhaang (लालढांग) is located at 29.85°N 78.32°E. It has an average elevation of 372 metres (1,220 ft). It is situated 19.4 km from Haridwar city at the edge of Rajaji National Park, off National Highway 74 (NH-74).

== Local attractions ==
Rajaji National Park has an entrance from here known as Laldhang gate, plus it is also a Reserved Forest; and an important destination for birdwatchers, being on southern edge of the Corbett National Park.

The main market of Laldhang has a Shiv Temple, with 'Panchyatan Shivling', brought from Panduwala, an archaeological site, two km. from Laldhang, where ruins of temples, and remains of earthenware dated to pre and post medieval period have been found.

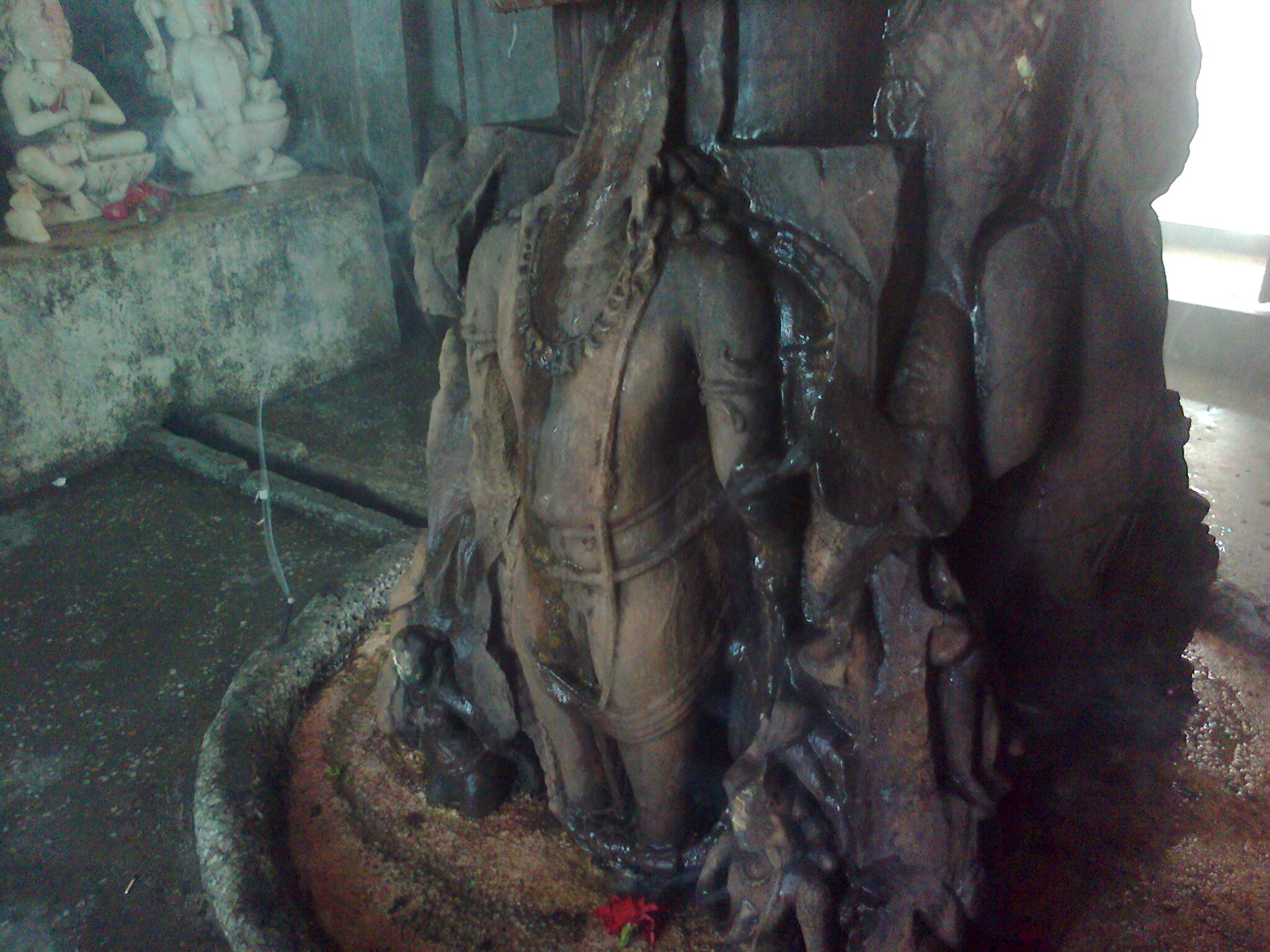
Shiv mandir laldhang

== History ==
During the times of Najib-ud-Daula, the Nawab of Najibabad, the fort at Laldhang is known to have offered safe refuge during the wars between the Rohillas and the Nawab of Awadh. Here in 1752, after trying a siege, the Rohilla gave a bond to the Marathas as a release price

After 1774, when the Rohilla power east of the Ganges was crushed, it was also the site where the final treaty by which the Bijnor territory of Rohilla was incorporated in Awadh, which was thereafter ceded to the British by the Nawab of Awadh, Shuja-ud-Daula in 1801 the natural temple of history-sunil badola rasulpur/lal dhang

Edward Gibbon mentions "Loldong" as the nearby landmark for the unrecognized location of "Coupele," the scene of Timur's last victory on his march to Delhi. (Volume 6, Chapter 65)

== Politics ==
Laldhang was an assembly constituency of Uttarakhand State Legislative Assembly, till 2012 when it was incorporated in newly created Haridwar Rural assembly seat. Here, present MLA is Smt Anupama Rawat of Indian National Congress (INC).
