= Provincial Police Service (Uttarakhand) =

Group 'A' policing service of the Indian state of Uttarakhand

Provincial Police Service Prāntīya Pulisa Sevā
Service overview
- Also known as: Uttarakhand Police Service
- Founded: 15 May 2001
- State: Uttarakhand
- Staff college: Police Training College, Narendranagar, Uttarakhand
- Cadre controlling authority: Department of Police, Government of Uttarakhand
- Minister responsible: Pushkar Singh Dhami, Chief Minister of Uttarakhand and Minister of Home Affairs
- Legal personality: Governmental: civil service
- Selection: State Police Service Examination conducted by the Uttarakhand Public Service Commission
- Association: Uttarakhand PPS Association

Head of the Provincial Police Service
- Director General of the Uttarakhand Police: Deepam Seth, IPS

Provincial Police Service (IAST: Prāntīya Pulisa Sevā), often abbreviated to as PPS, is the state civil service for policing of Uttarakhand Police comprising Group A and Group B posts. It is also the feeder service for Indian Police Service in the state.

PPS officers hold various posts at the circle, district, range, zonal and state levels to maintain order, enforce the law and to prevent and detect crime. The Department of Home of the Government of Uttarakhand is the cadre controlling authority of the service. Along with the Provincial Civil Service (PCS) and the Provincial Forest Service (PFS), the PPS is one of the three feeder services to its respective All India Services.

== Responsibilities of a PPS officer ==
The typical functions performed by a PPS officer are:

- To fulfil duties based on border responsibilities, in the areas of maintenance of public peace and order, crime prevention, investigation, and detection, collection of intelligence, VIP security, counter-terrorism, border policing, railway policing, tackling smuggling, drug trafficking, economic offences, corruption in public life, disaster management, enforcement of socio-economic legislation, bio-diversity and protection of environmental laws etc.
- Leading and commanding the State Vigilance Establishment, Crime Branch-Criminal Investigation Department (CB-CID), State Intelligence Bureau etc. under the supervision of officers senior to them.
- Leading and commanding the UKPAC, Uttarakhand Special Task Force (UKSTF) etc. under the supervision of police officers senior to them.
- To interact and coordinate closely with the members of other state civil services in the matters regarding policing.
- To lead and command the force with courage, uprightness, dedication and a strong sense of service to the people.
- Endeavour to inculcate in the police forces under their command such values and norms as would help them serve the people better.
- Inculcate integrity of the highest order, sensitivity to aspirations of people in a fast-changing social and economic milieu, respect for human rights, the broad liberal perspective of law and justice and high standard of professionalism.

== See also ==
- Provincial Civil Service (Uttarakhand)
- Provincial Forest Service (Uttarakhand)
