= Provincial Forest Service (Uttarakhand) =

Government Agency

Provincial Forest Service Prāntīya Vana Sevā
Service overview
- Also known as: Uttarakhand Forest Service
- Founded: 15 May 2001
- State: Uttarakhand
- Staff college: Central Academy for State Forest Service, Dehradun, Uttarakhand
- Cadre controlling authority: Department of Forest, Government of Uttarakhand
- Minister responsible: Subodh Uniyal, Minister of Forest and Wildlife
- Legal personality: Governmental: Natural resources
- Duties: Forestry, Wildlife, Environmental science and Ecology
- Selection: State Forest Service Examination conducted by the Uttarakhand Public Service Commission
- Association: Uttarakhand PFS Association

Head of the Provincial Civil Services
- Principal Chief Conservator of Forests (Head of the Uttarakhand Forest Forces): Dhananjai Mohan, IFS

Provincial Forest Service (IAST: Prāntīya Vana Sevā), often abbreviated to as PFS, is one of the natural resource services under Group 'A' and Group 'B' state service of Government of Uttarakhand, India. It is responsible for ensuring the ecological stability of the country via thorough protection and participatory sustainable forestry, wildlife and environment. It is also the feeder service for Indian Forest Service in the state.

The Department of Forest of the Government of Uttarakhand is the cadre-controlling authority of the service. Along with the two state civil services which are Provincial Civil Service (PCS) and the Provincial Police Service (PPS), the PFS is one of the three feeder services to its respective All India Services.

== Recruitment ==
One-third of the PFS quota is filled by promotion from forest rangers' cadre, and the remainder of recruitment is done on the basis of an annual competitive examination conducted by Uttarakhand Public Service Commission. PFS officers, regardless of their mode of entry, are appointed by the Governor of Uttarakhand.

== Responsibilities of a PFS officer ==
The typical functions performed by a PFS officer are:

- Conservation of precious forest resources while understanding the larger policies of the government to protect and preserve the heritage of the forest and its resources.

== See also ==
- Provincial Civil Service (Uttarakhand)
- Provincial Police Service (Uttarakhand)
