= Provincial Civil Service (Uttarakhand) =

Administrative civil service under the state government of Uttarakhand

Provincial Civil Service Prāntīya Sivila Sevā
Service overview
- Also known as: Uttarakhand Civil Service
- Founded: 15 May 2001
- State: Uttarakhand
- Staff college: Dr. Raghunandan Singh Tolia Academy of Administration, Nainital, Uttarakhand
- Cadre controlling authority: Department of General Administration, Government of Uttarakhand
- Minister responsible: Pushkar Singh Dhami, Chief Minister of Uttarakhand and Minister of Home Affairs
- Legal personality: Governmental: Civil service
- Selection: State Civil Services Examination conducted by the Uttarakhand Public Service Commission
- Association: Uttarakhand PCS Association

Head of the Provincial Civil Service
- Chief Secretary of Uttarakhand: Anand Bardhan,IAS

Provincial Civil Service (IAST: Prāntīya Sivila Sevā, often abbreviated to as PCS, is the administrative civil service of the Government of Uttarakhand comprising Group A and Group B posts. It is also the feeder service for Indian Administrative Service in the state.

PCS officers hold various posts at sub-divisional, district, divisional and state level from conducting revenue administration and maintenance of law and order. The Department of General Administration of the Government of Uttarakhand is the cadre-controlling authority of the service. Along with the Provincial Police Service (PPS) and the Provincial Forest Service (PFS), the PCS is one of the three feeder services to its respective All India Services.

== Recruitment ==
Half of the recruitment to the service is made on the basis of an annual competitive examination conducted by Uttarakhand Public Service Commission called as direct PCS officers as they are directly appointed at Deputy Collector rank. Half of the total strength of PCS officers is filled by promotion from Uttarakhand Lower Provincial Civil Service (tehsildar cadre) who are known as promotee PCS officers. PCS officers, regardless of their mode of entry, are appointed by the Governor of Uttarakhand.

== Responsibilities of a PCS officer ==
The typical functions performed by a PCS officer are:

- To collect land revenue and function as courts in matters of revenue and crime (revenue courts and criminal courts of executive magistrate), to maintain law and order, to implement the union and state government policies at the grass-root level when posted at field positions i.e. as sub-divisional magistrate, additional city magistrate, city magistrate, additional district magistrate and additional divisional commissioner. And to act as the agent of the government on the field, i.e. to act as the intermediate between public and the government.
- To handle the administration and daily proceedings of the government, including formulation and implementation of policy in consultation with the minister-in-charge, additional chief secretary/principal secretary and secretary of the concerned department.

== See also ==
- Provincial Police Service (Uttarakhand)
- Provincial Forest Service (Uttarakhand)
- Vinod Prasad Raturi
