= Uttarakhand Forest Department =

Ministry and department of the Government of Uttarakhand in India

Agency overview
- Formed: 9 November 2000
- Jurisdiction: Uttarakhand
- Headquarters: Dehradun
- Minister responsible: Subodh Uniyal, Minister of Forest and Environment
- Agency executive: Dhananjai Mohan, IFS, Head of Forest Forces
- Parent agency: Government of Uttarakhand
- Website: http://forest.uk.gov.in/

The Uttarakhand Forest Department is one of the departments of Government of Uttarakhand.

== See also ==
- Provincial Forest Service (Uttarakhand)
- List of departments of the government of Uttarakhand
