= Chechi (clan) =

Chechi clan of the Gujjar ethnic group found in Pakistan, Afghanistan and India

Chechi Chechi
- Ethnicity: Gujjar
- Location: Pakistan, India, Afghanistan
- Branches: Motla, Chadri
- Language: Punjabi, Hindko, Urdu, Hindi, Gujjari, Pahari, Koshur

Chechi is a clan of the Gurjar community in Afghanistan, Pakistan, and India that is prevalent among the Hindu, Sikh, and Muslim Gujjars.

== Distributions ==
They mostly inhabit the north Indian States of Rajasthan, Gujarat, Madhya Pradesh, Uttar Pradesh, Himachal Pradesh, Punjab, India, Haryana, Uttarakhand, Jammu and Kashmir, and Dehli, while in Pakistan they are found in all four provinces, including Sindh, Punjab, Balochistan, Khyber Pakhtunkhwa, including Hazara, and in Azad Kashmir they reside in the village of chechian - where the chechi-gurjar originates from Gilgit-Baltistan and Islamabad.

== Sources ==
1. William Crooke (1890) An Ethnographical Hand-book for the N.-W. Provinces and Oudh North-Western provinces and Oudh government Press. p.ii
2. Henry Samuel Price Davies (1892) Customary Law of the Gujrat District Civil and military gazette Press. p. 2
3. Sir Denzil Ibbetson, Maclagan (1990) Glossary of the Tribes and Castes of the Punjab and North West Frontier Province Asian Educational Services. p. 314, ISBN 9788120605053
4. Sir Denzil Ibbetson, Maclagan (1916) Panjab Castes: Being a Reprint of the Chapter on "The Races, Castes, and Tribes of the People" in the Report on the Census of the Panjab Superintendent, Government Printing, Punjab. p. 188
5. India. Census Commissioner, Sir William Chichele Plowden (1883) Report on the Census of British India, Taken on the 17th February 1881: Volume 3 Eyre and Spottiswoode. p. Cxxvii
6. Bakhshish Singh Nijjar (2008) Origins and History of Jats and Other Allied Nomadic Tribes of India 900 B.C.-1947 A.D. Atlantic Publishers & Distributors. p. 207, ISBN 9788126909087
