= Rajaji National Park =

National park in Uttarakhand, India

- IUCN category II (national park)
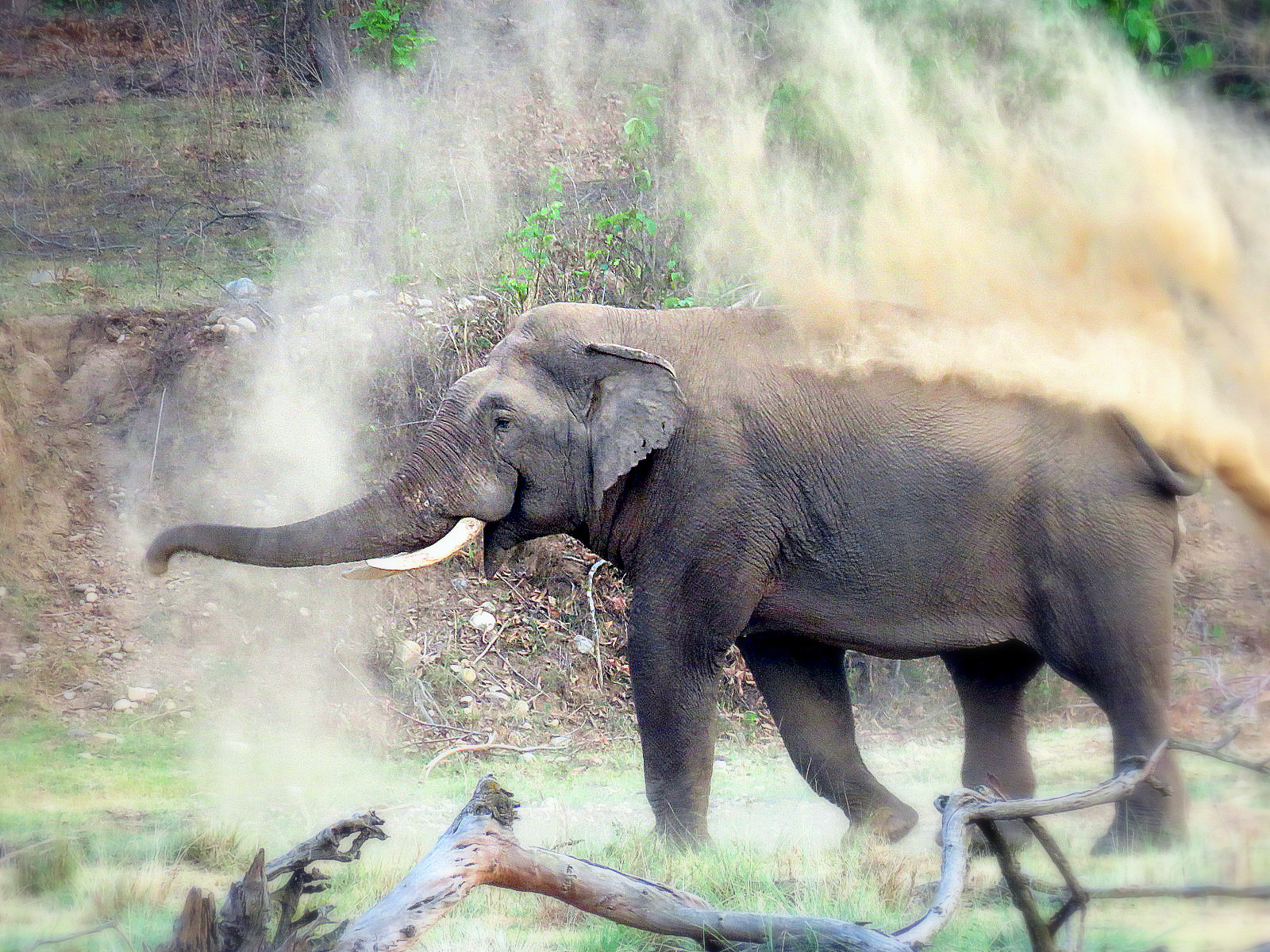
- Indian elephant in Rajaji National Park

- Location within Uttarakhand Location within India
- Interactive map of Rajaji National Park
- Location: Uttarakhand, India
- Nearest city: Haridwar and Dehra Dun
- Coordinates: 30°03′29″N 78°10′22″E
- Area: 820.5 km^{2} (316.8 sq mi)
- Established: 1948 (Wildlife Sanctuary); 1983 (National Park); 2015 (as Tiger Reserve)
- Governing body: Uttarakhand Forest Department

Rajaji National Park is a national park and tiger reserve in the Haridwar, Dehradun and Pauri Garhwal districts of the Indian state of Uttarakhand. It encompasses an area of 820 km^{2} (320 sq mi) in the Sivalik Hills. In 1983, three wildlife sanctuaries in the area, namely Chilla, Motichur and Rajaji, were merged into one.

== History ==
In 1948, the area was created as Rajaji Sanctuary, and Rajaji, Motichur and Chila area were declared as Rajaji National Park in 1983. In 2015, the government approved a proposal to grant Rajaji National Park the status of a tiger reserve.

== Geography ==
Rajaji National Park is located in Sivalik Hills in Dehradun district, Haridwar district and Pauri Garhwal district. It covers total area of 820 km^{2} (320 sq mi). It has constituted Rajaji wildlife sanctuary, Motichur and Chilla. The elevation ranges from 300 to 1400 meters. The Ganga river flows through the national park and divides the park into two parts, the western Rajaji and motichur sanctuary and the eastern Chilla sanctuary.

== Flora ==
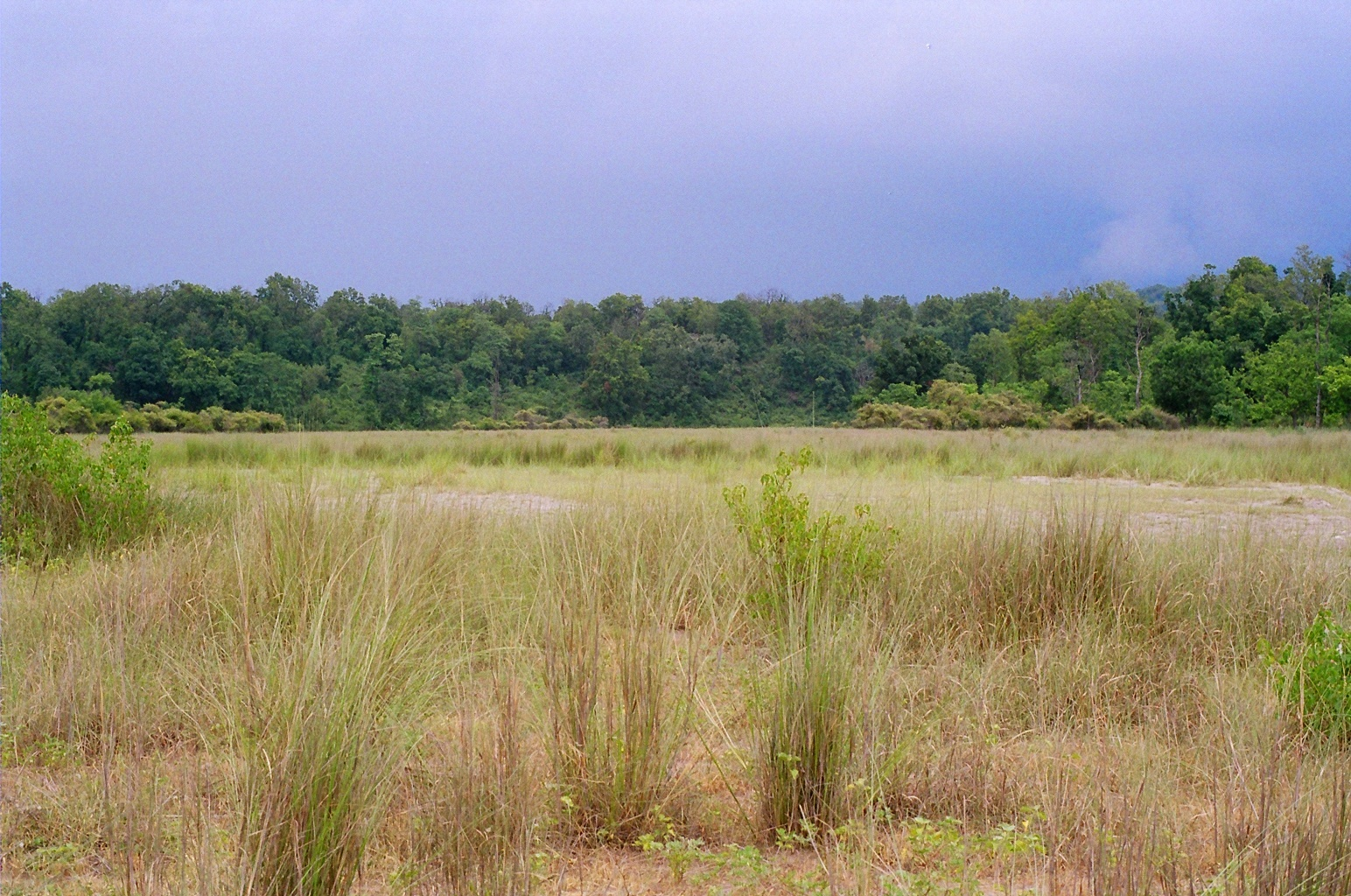
Grassland in Chilla Range

Rajaji National Park is nestled between the Sivalik Hills and the Indo-Gangetic Plain. Broadleaved deciduous forests and riparian vegetation, shrubland, grasslands and pine forests form the main habitats in the park. The often sparse understory consists of rohini (Mallotus philippensis), amaltas (Cassia fistula), shisham (Dalbergia sissoo), sal (Shorea robusta), palash (Butea monosperma), arjun (Terminalia arjuna), khair (Senegalia catechu), baans (Dendrocalamus strictus), semul (Bombax ceiba), sandan, chamror (Ehretia), amla Phyllanthus emblica, kachnar (Bauhinia variegata), ber (Ziziphus mauritiana), chilla (Casearia), bel (Aegle marmelos).

== Fauna ==
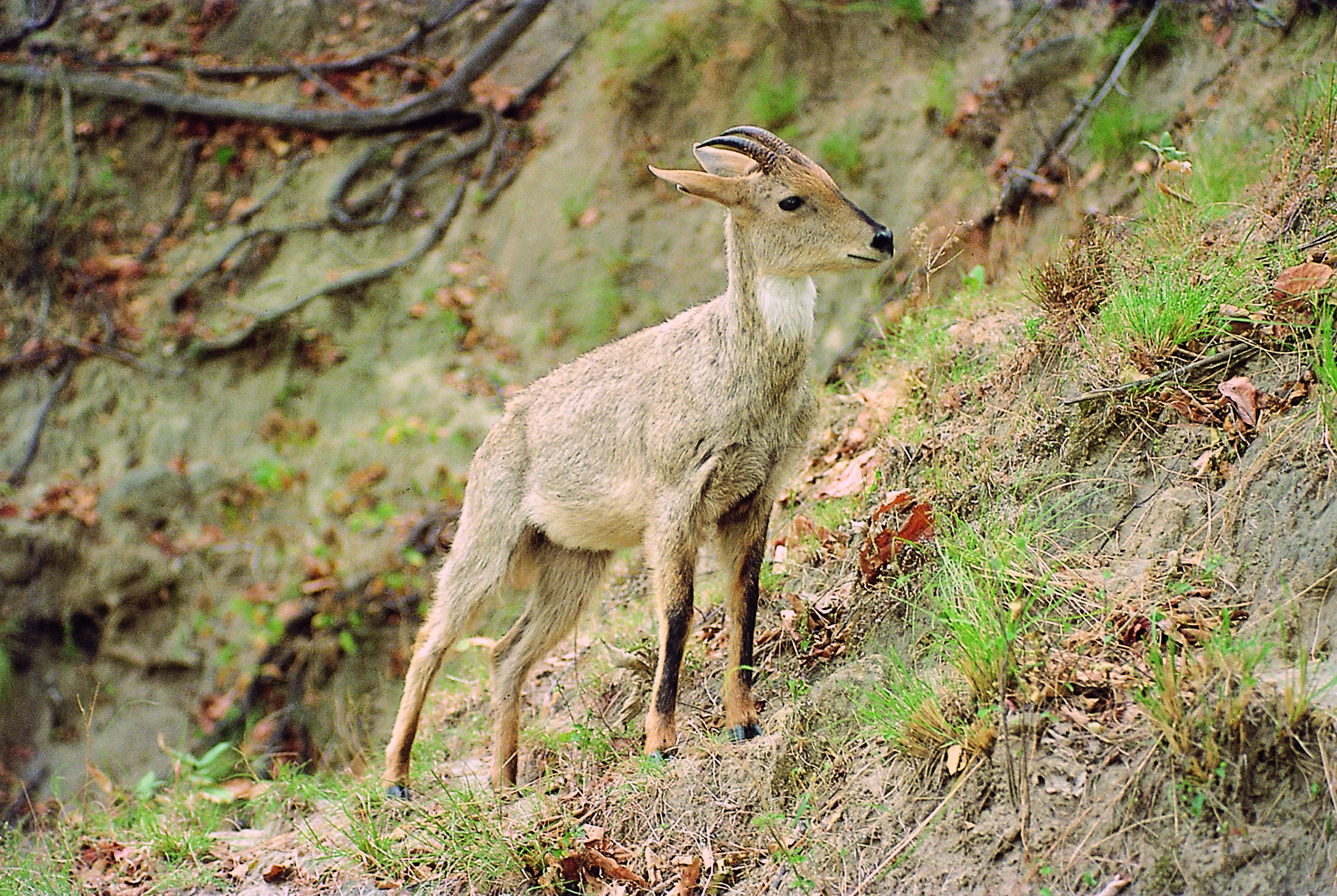
A goral in Rajaji National Park

Rajaji National Park hosts many wild animals including Indian elephant, Bengal tiger, Indian leopard, chital, sambar deer, barasingha, northern red muntjac, Indian hog deer, nilgai, wild boar, sloth bear, Asian black bear, rhesus macaque, common langur, leopard cat, jungle cat, dhole, Bengal fox, golden jackal and yellow-throated marten, goral and Himalayan tahr. The goral and the Himalayan tahr mainly stay on the precipitous, pine-covered slopes. The Himalayan black bear inhabits the higher reaches of the park. Other wildlife in the park include Bengal monitor, Brahminy blindsnake, Burmese python, common krait, Indian cobra, Indian crested porcupine, Indian flying fox, Indian grey mongoose, Indian hare, king cobra, Oriental garden lizard, Russell's viper, smooth-coated otter and white-bellied giant flying squirrel.

Over 315 species of birds occur in the park, including peafowl, red jungle fowl, black partridge, quail, woodpecker, Egyptian vulture, Himalayan vulture, red-headed vulture, Indian grey hornbill, Crested serpent eagle and great hornbill.
