= Kendra (disambiguation) =

Kendra is a female given name.

Kendra may also refer to:

- Tropical Storm Kendra, in the 1966 Atlantic hurricane season
- Hurricane Kendra (1978)
- Kendra (TV series), an American reality-based television series
- Center in Hindi-language as in:
  - Balbir Singh Sahitya Kendra
  - Doordarshan Kendra, Mumbai
  - Dhrupad Kendra Bhopal
  - E-Dhara Kendra
  - Gau Vigyan Anusandhan Kendra
  - Gandhi Krishi Vigyana Kendra
  - Grama Vikas Kendra
  - Jaipur Kathak Kendra
  - Jawahar Kala Kendra
  - Kala Kendra Jammu
  - Krishi Vigyan Kendra
  - Krishi Vigyan Kendra, Jalgaon Jamod
  - Palika Kendra
  - Post Office Passport Seva Kendra
  - Sanskar Kendra
  - Sanskriti Kendra Museum
  - Sewa kendra
  - Shriram Bharatiya Kala Kendra
  - Van Vigyan Kendra
  - Vivekananda Kendra

== See also ==
- Kendra's Law, a New York State law concerning involuntary outpatient commitment
