= Cultural Foundation =

Cultural Foundation may refer to:

- Abu Dhabi Cultural Foundation
- America Israel Cultural Foundation
- Cayman National Cultural Foundation
- Ema Gordon Klabin Cultural Foundation
- European Cultural Foundation
- Grace Communion International
- Kumho Cultural Foundation
- Cultural Foundation of the National Bank of Greece
- National Cultural Foundation
- Rich Mix Cultural Foundation
- Romanian Cultural Foundation
- Tribal Research and Cultural Foundation
- Turkish Cultural Foundation
