= GVK =

GVK may refer to:

- GVK (conglomerate), an Indian conglomerate
- Giravanz Kitakyushu, a Japanese football club
- Grama Vikas Kendra, of the Mahatma Gandhi University
- Godzilla vs. Kong, a 2021 monster film
