= South Carolina House Bill 4624 =

2024 South Carolina law

South Carolina House of Representatives
- Long title: An act to amend the South Carolina Code of Laws by adding Chapter 42 to Title 44 so as to define gender, sex, and other terms, to prohibit the provision of gender transition procedures to a person under eighteen years of age, to provide exceptions, to prohibit the use of public funds for gender transition procedures, and to provide penalties; and by adding Section 59-32-36 so as to prohibit public school staff and officials from withholding knowledge of a minor's perception of their gender from the minor's parents, among other things.
- Territorial extent: South Carolina
- Passed by: South Carolina House of Representatives
- Passed: January 17, 2024
- Passed by: South Carolina Senate
- Passed: May 2, 2024
- Signed by: Henry McMaster
- Signed: May 21, 2024
- Voting summary: 82 voted for; 23 voted against
- Voting summary: 27 voted for; 8 voted against

Summary
- Restricts gender-affirming care for South Carolinians under 18 years of age and requires schools to notify parents if their children prefer pronouns or identify as a gender that does not align with their sex assigned at birth.
- Status: In force

South Carolina House Bill 4624 (H.B. 4624), commonly known as the Help Not Harm Bill, is a 2024 law in the state of South Carolina that restricts gender-affirming care for South Carolinians under 18 years of age and requires schools to notify parents if their children prefer pronouns or identify as a gender that does not align with their sex assigned at birth.

The bill was signed into law on May 21, 2024 by Governor Henry McMaster following passage in the Senate on May 2. A lawsuit from the ACLU of South Carolina, Misanin v. Wilson, is pending in the U.S. District Court for South Carolina as of June 2025.

== Provisions ==
H.B. 4624 restricts gender-affirming care, namely hormone replacement therapy (HRT), puberty blockers, and sex reassignment surgery. A grandfather clause was included for minors already on said care prior to August 1, 2024. The grandfather clause for extended treatment expired on January 31, 2025, with the doctor being required to slowly reduce the dosage of any hormones or blockers until then. The bill criminalizes providing sex reassignment surgery to minors and medical professionals who knowingly provide such surgery can be convicted of a felony. Exceptions for medical treatment exist for minors diagnosed with precocious puberty, endometriosis, and similar conditions.

H.B. 4624 also requires schools to give parental notification if they discover a student using pronouns differing from their biological sex, identifying as a gender that does not align with their biological sex, or using a name different from their legal name.

== Reactions ==
=== Support ===
The Heritage Foundation, a conservative action group, supported H.B. 4624 in a statement and simultaneously endorsed similar bills in different states. Governor Henry McMaster released a statement in January prior to its passage generally supporting H.B. 4624. He later stated to ABC News that he was proud to have signed it and that he would continue to fight to oppose similar procedures to minors.

=== Opposition ===
The ACLU of South Carolina released a statement after the bill was first passed in the South Carolina House of Representatives opposing H.B. 4624. Several civil rights groups, including the Campaign for Southern Equality, opposed the bill and provided resources to those affected. Medical groups such as the American Medical Association and American Academy of Pediatrics have opposed legislation similar to H.B. 4624.
