= Rafiq Anjum =

Indian poet

Dr. Rafique Anjum
- Born: January 1, 1962 (age 64); Kalai Poonch, Jammu & Kashmir. India
- Education: Govt. Medical College Srinagar/ Jammmu (J&K
- Writing career
- Notable awards: Awarded by Jammu and Kashmir Academy of Art, Culture & Languages

Dr. Rafique Anjum ڈاکٹر رفیق انجم (Alternate Spelling Dr. Anjum Awan), a paediatrician by profession, is also a poet, Islamic scholar, and researcher of Jammu and Kashmir who writes in Urdu, Punjabi, and Gojri. He is presently working as Chair Professor in Tribal Studies at Baba Ghulam Shah Badshah University, Rajouri (J&K) and the Coordinator, Centre for Research in Gojri, Pahari & Kashmiri of the said University. He is the recipient of the state-level award for Excellence in Literature in 2007 and is a member of the General Council of Jammu and Kashmir Academy of Art, Culture and Languages. He has served as Registrar and Consultant Pediatrician in GMC Srinagar and Consultant Paediatrician in JK Health Services.

== Literary life ==
Anjum Awan is a poet and scholar of both Urdu and Gojri languages besides being a writer of English language. A number of his poetic collections, in both Urdu and Gojri languages, have earned him accolades across the sub-continent. He represents the higher echelon of the modern Gojri scholarship.

== Honours and awards ==
1. Academy Best Book Award Dil Darya 1996.
2. Himalayan Man Of Letters Award (HEM)1999.
3. State Level Academy Award for Excellence in Literature 2007.
4. Gujjar Gandhi Award 2017
5. State Humanity Award 2018
6. Award for Excellence in Literature 2019
7. Life Member IAP Mumbai INDIA
8. J&K Government UT Level First Tribal Award in the category of Literature 2022 handed over by Lt. Governor, Jammu Kashmir

== Publications ==
=== Creative writing ===
1. Khwab Jazeeray(Urdu Poetry) 1993.
2. Dil Darya (Gojri Poetry)1995. Best book Award twice, 1996.
3. Kora Kagaz (Gojri short stories)1996.
4. Soghaat (Gojri Poetry Revised & Enlarged edition) 2004.
5. Kaash! (Urdu Poetry Revised & Enlarged edition) 2005.
6. Banjara( A Directory of Indo-Pak Gojri Writers) 2007.
7. ZANBEEL 2018
8. CHITTI MITTI (Fiction) 2019

=== Research and analysis ===
1. Golden History Of Gojri Language And Literature. (Ten volumes)
- vol. I Prologue to Golden History)
- vol. II Ancient Gojri literature,
- vol. III Modern Gojri literature,
- vol. IV Modern Gojri Poetry,
- vol. V Gojri Ghazal (an anthology),
- vol. IV Gojri Songs (geet),
- vol. VII Gojri short stories (an anthology),
- vol. VIII Gojri Drama (an anthology),
- vol. IX Biography of Gojri Writers)
- vol. X Abridged Golden History.

=== Miscellaneous ===
1. Soch Samandar (An anthology of modern Gojri Poetry) 1994
2. Ghazal Silony (An anthology of modern Gojri Ghazal) 1995
3. Gojri Quotations (Mhara Akhaan, mhari pachhaan).
4. Basic Gojri Grammar (the first-ever Gojri Grammar: co-author: Mansha Khaki)
5. Anjum Shanasi (Biographical notes, articles and expert views/comments on life and works of Dr. Rafique Anjum)

=== Lexicography ===
1. Gojri English Dictionary 2004 (the first-ever bilingual Gojri Dictionary) Best book Award 2007.
2. Gojri Urdu English Dictionary 2007
3. Gojri Kashmiri English Dictionary 2018
4. Gojri Hindi English Dictionary (under compilation)
