= E-Dhara Kendra =

Government office in Gujarat

e-Dhara Kendra (Gujarati:ઇ-ધરા કેન્દ્ર) is a government office at Gujarat. Each e-Dhara Kendra is situated at Taluka Mamlatdar Office. The Gujarat government’s e-Dhara project aimed to modernise land administration and to enable farmers to manage this crucial resource better. e-Dhara is the name of the taluka centre, where farmers can access their land records, obtain copies of ownership documents and even apply for ration cards.

== History ==
During the year 1988-89 Shri K D Buddha, Mr. Dr. V V Ram Subbarava and Mr. C K Koshi IAS officers found E-Dhara Project. During his 1989-2008 tenure, Mr. Sharad Raval contributes for e-Dhara such as land management, executive and technical contributions. Computer Programming begins in 1996-97 by keeping concepts Records Of Rights of F G H Anderson. The technical co-operation by the Gujarat Government and NIC (Government of India) project conducted statewide extension in 1997. In January, 2004 conducted by computerization of all 225 Taluka. Since 2011 all taluka databases have been migrated to GoG State Data Centre, Gandhinagar. E-dhara kendra uses WebBhulekh (Web enabled software) accessible through INTRANET GSWAN (Gujarat Statewide area network).

== Objectives ==
The primary objective of Computerisation of Land Record Project was to achieve Complete Computerisation of Land Records across the state. Elimination of Manual Records, computer controlled mutation process and self-sustainability are the leading objectives of the e-Dhara system.

- To convert physical Village Land Records into Electronic records.
- Automate maintenance and updating of Village Land Records in a secure manner.
- set up e-Dhara Kendra (e-DKs) for accessing and updating of Land Records in a scalable manner
- To charge user fee for self sustainable structure.
- Auto Mutation for Sale and Boja transaction

== Works of e-Dhara ==
At e-DK, mutation are registered in digital format, which are done in Village Form No. 6, 7, 8A and 12. The mutation are recorded here by the Government of Gujarat's GSWAN connectivity, and the data are stored at central server situated at Gandhinagar. The data are stored in Unicode format. At, e-DK, mutation in below Village Forms are recorded :

- Village Form No. 6
- Village Form No. 7
- Village Form No. 12
- village old entries
