= Korri =

Korri clan

- Religions: Hinduism, Islam
- Languages: Gujari, Kashmiri, Punjabi, Urdu, and Hindi
- Country: India, Pakistan
- Region: Punjab, Pakistan, Azad Kashmir, Gilgit-Baltistan, Himachal Pradesh, Uttarakhand, Jammu and Kashmir
- Ethnicity: Gurjar (Gujjar)

Korri is a clan of the Gurjar people of southern Asia.

They're irrespectively found among the Hindu and Muslim Gujjars. They principally live in the areas like Punjab, Pakistan, Azad Kashmir, Himachal Pradesh, Uttarakhand, and Jammu and Kashmir.
