= Sarban =

Sarban may refer to:

- Sarban Confederacy
- Sarban-e Damuyi, a village in Iran
- Sarban (singer)
- Sarban (author)
