= Eastern Gujari =

Form and dialect of the Gujari language

Eastern Gujjari
- مَشرِقی گُجری
- Native to: Jammu, Himachal Pradesh, Uttar Pradesh, Delhi, Haryana, Rajasthan
- Region: India
- Ethnicity: Muslim Gurjars, Hindu Gurjars
- Native speakers: 14,00,000
- Language family: Indo-European: Indo-Iranian; Indo-Aryan; Western; Rajasthani–Marwari; Rajasthani; Gujari; Eastern Gujjari
- Writing system: Takri, Perso-Arabic script

Language codes
- ISO 639-3: –
- Glottolog: east2311

Eastern Gujari is a standard form and dialect of the Gujari language. It is spoken in the northwestern parts of India. Speakers of Eastern Gujari are mainly distributed across Jammu, Himachal Pradesh, Uttar Pradesh, Delhi, Haryana, Rajasthan regions of India. It comprises several minor dialects of Gujari. People who speak Western Gujari can also easily understand Eastern Gujari.

== Dialects ==
Eastern Gujari consists mainly of following dialects: Rajasthani Gujari, Jammu Gujari, Himachali Gujari, Delhi/Haryana Gujari, and Uttar Pradesh Gujari.

- Rajasthani Gujari: is spoken in the state of Rajasthan, India
- Jammu Gujari: is spoken in Jammu division of Jammu and Kashmir.
- Himachali Gujari: is spoken in Himachal Pradesh state of India.
- Delhi/Haryana Gujari: is spoken in Delhi and Haryana, India.
- Banihari Gujari: is Spoken by Dodhi Gujars in Jammu and Kashmir and Uttarakhand.
