= Javaid Rahi =

Indian author

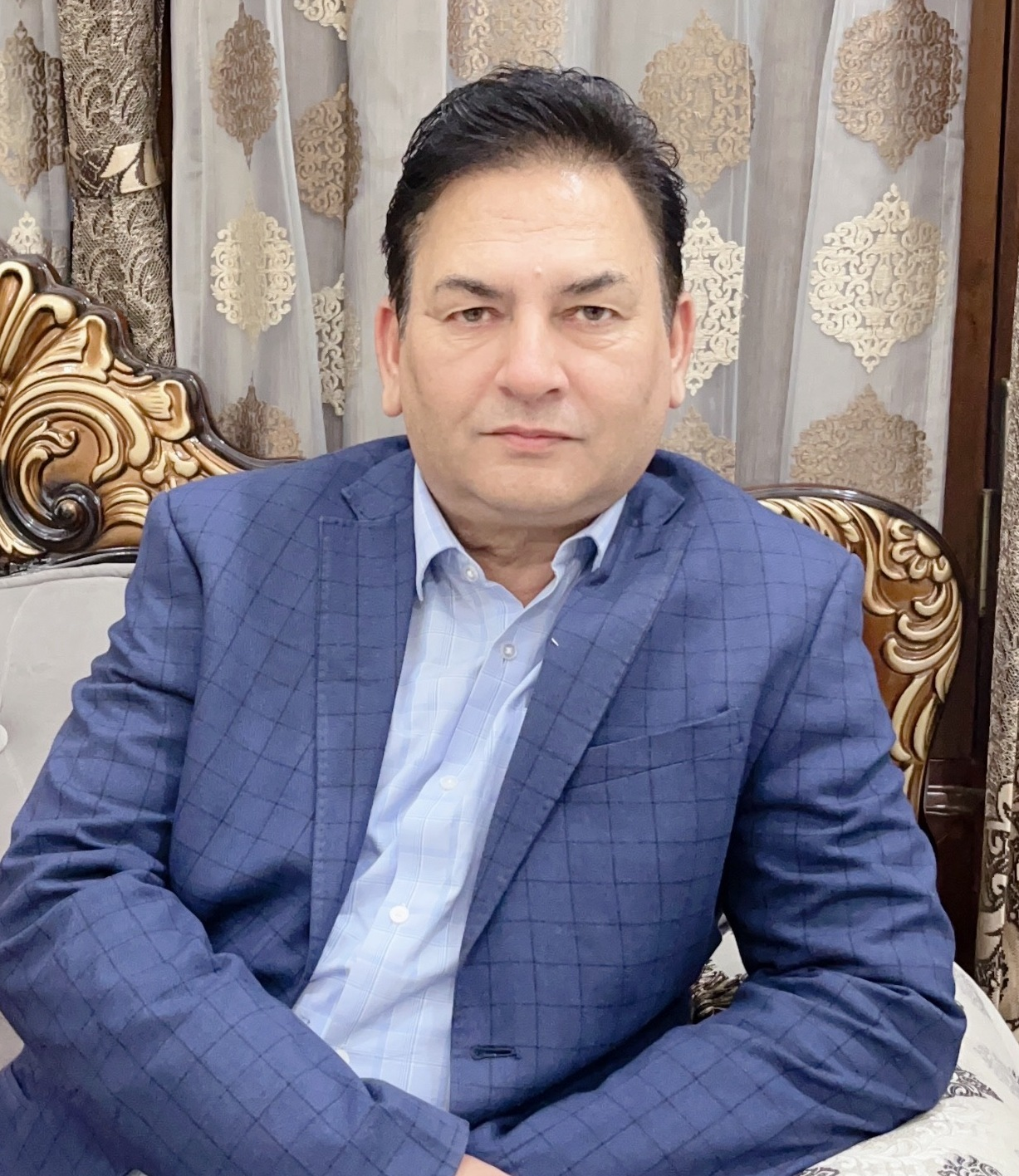
- Javaid Rahi in 2024
- Born: Poonch, Jammu & Kashmir, India
- Education: University of Jammu (PhD)
- Occupations: Author; tribal researcher and social reformer
- Notable work: 300+ books (edited/authored) on tribal research, 22 years in social service in JK tribes
- Children: Ali Javaid (Son)
- Awards: J&K Tribal Awards 2022 from Government of Jammu and Kashmir; Award of National Fellowship form Ministry of Culture (Govt of India); Award for Best Book from Jammu and Kashmir Academy of Art, Culture and Languages
- Website: youtube.com/@javaidrahi1

Javaid Rahi is an Indian author, researcher and tribal social worker. He writes in Gojri, Punjabi, and Urdu. His work focuses on tribal literature, history, and culture, particularly of pastoral communities such as the Gujjars, Bakarwals, Shina-Dard, Sippis, Gaddis, and other Scheduled Tribe groups in India and has written 25 books and edited over 300 books including issues of bi-monthly magazines Sheeraza -Gojri.

== Early life and education ==
Javaid was born in 1970, at Chandak village of Poonch District of Jammu and Kashmir. He completed his Master of Arts degree in 1999 and Doctor of Philosophy degree (Ph.D.) from the University of Jammu in 2004. He conducted a study on the six "tribal languages" of Jammu and Kashmir including Gujari, Shina, Gaddi, Balti, Purgi and Ladakhi also known as Boti.

== Social work and reforms ==
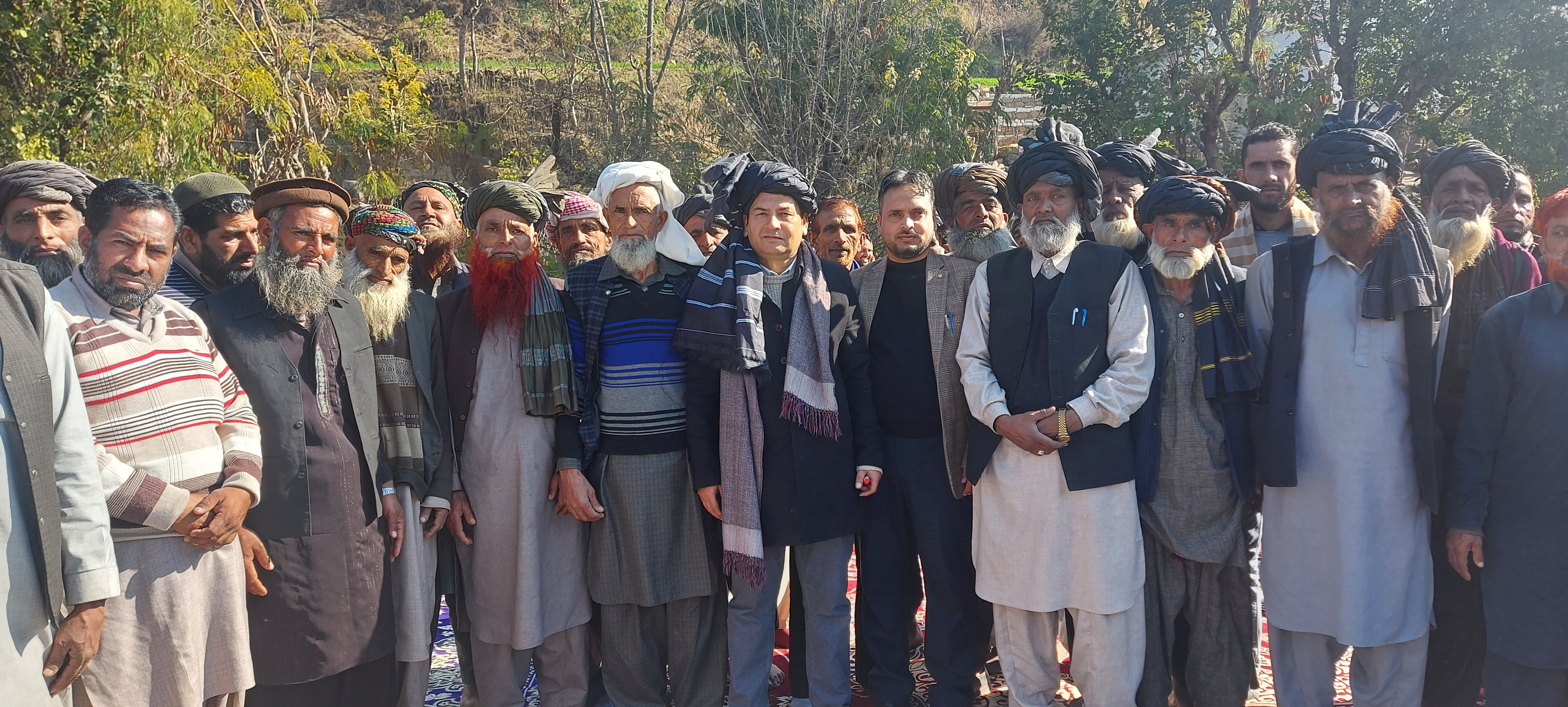
Javaid Rahi with Gujjars and Bakarwals during awareness programmes

Rahi has been working for welfare and development of tribal and nomadic communities of Jammu and Kashmir since 1994. For nearly three decades, ST groups in Jammu and Kashmir were not extended several central laws available to Scheduled Tribes in other parts of India, including the Forest Rights Act, 2006, the SC/ST (Prevention of Atrocities) Act, and provisions for political reservation in the Assembly and Panchayati Raj institutions, owing to the region’s special constitutional status at the time. He worked among Scheduled Tribe (ST) communities for creating awareness about tribal rights and built a movement among Gujjars, Bakarwals, and Gaddis through tribal conferences, seminars, and public meetings for the extension of central laws thereby securing equality, justice, and rights comparable to those available to other Scheduled Tribe communities across the country. Much of this work was carried out under the banner of the Tribal Research and Cultural Foundation an organisation founded by him in 1998.

Following the enactment of the Jammu and Kashmir Reorganisation Act, 2019, several national laws applicable to Scheduled Tribes were extended to the Union Territory. in 2024.

His contributions to tribal welfare and development have been noted in the book India’s Greatest Reformers – 51 Extraordinary Stories by Prof. K. L. Johar -( Vice Chancellor), published and released in Delhi University in 2024.

== Tribal research and literary work ==
Lt. Governor Manoj Sinha of J&K releasing the books of Dr. Javaid Rahi at Raj Bawan Jammu

His research studies on tribal communities have been published by Government and non government institutions such as Jammu and Kashmir Academy of Art, Culture and Languages, Central Institute of Indian Languages, Tribal Research Institute-J&K, Department of Tribal Affairs, J&K besides community organisations including Gurjar Desh Charitable Trust, Jammu and Tribal Research and Cultural Foundation. A Gojri dictionary comprising approximately 70,000 words was compiled under his supervision.

== Main works ==
=== Books ===
Rahi has authored a number of reference books in Gujari, Urdu, English, and other languages, published by the Jammu and Kashmir Academy of Art, Culture and Languages, Gurjar Desh Charitable Trust, Tribal Research and Cultural Foundation.

=== Dictionaries in Tribal Languages ===
- Gojri Dictionary by Javaid Rahi. Jammu: Jammu and Kashmir Academy of Art Culture and Languages. 2014.
- Gujjar Qabila Ki Louk Warsti Dictionary by Javaid Rahi - Volume-1 (Folk-Lore Dictionary of Gujjar Tribe). Published by Tribal Research and Cultural Foundation Jmmu. 2004.
- Gujjar Qabila Ki Louk Warsti Dictionary by Javaid Rahi- Volume-II (Folk-Lore Dictionary of Gujjar Tribe). Published by Tribal Research and Cultural Foundation Jammu. 2005.
- Compiled first-ever Hindi- Gojri Dictionary Published by Tribal Research and Cultural Foundation J&K in 2002.
- Compiled and edited Lughat-e-Gojri (Dictionary of Classical Gojri) Published by J&K Academy of Art, Culture and Languages in 2014

=== Encyclopedia ===
- Research: "Himailyai Gujjar Encyclopedia" (Encyclopedia of Himalayan Gujjars) a Project of the Ministry of Culture, Govt. of India allotted under the Cultural Heritage of Himalaya Scheme, published in 2004.

=== Main work (Research ) ===
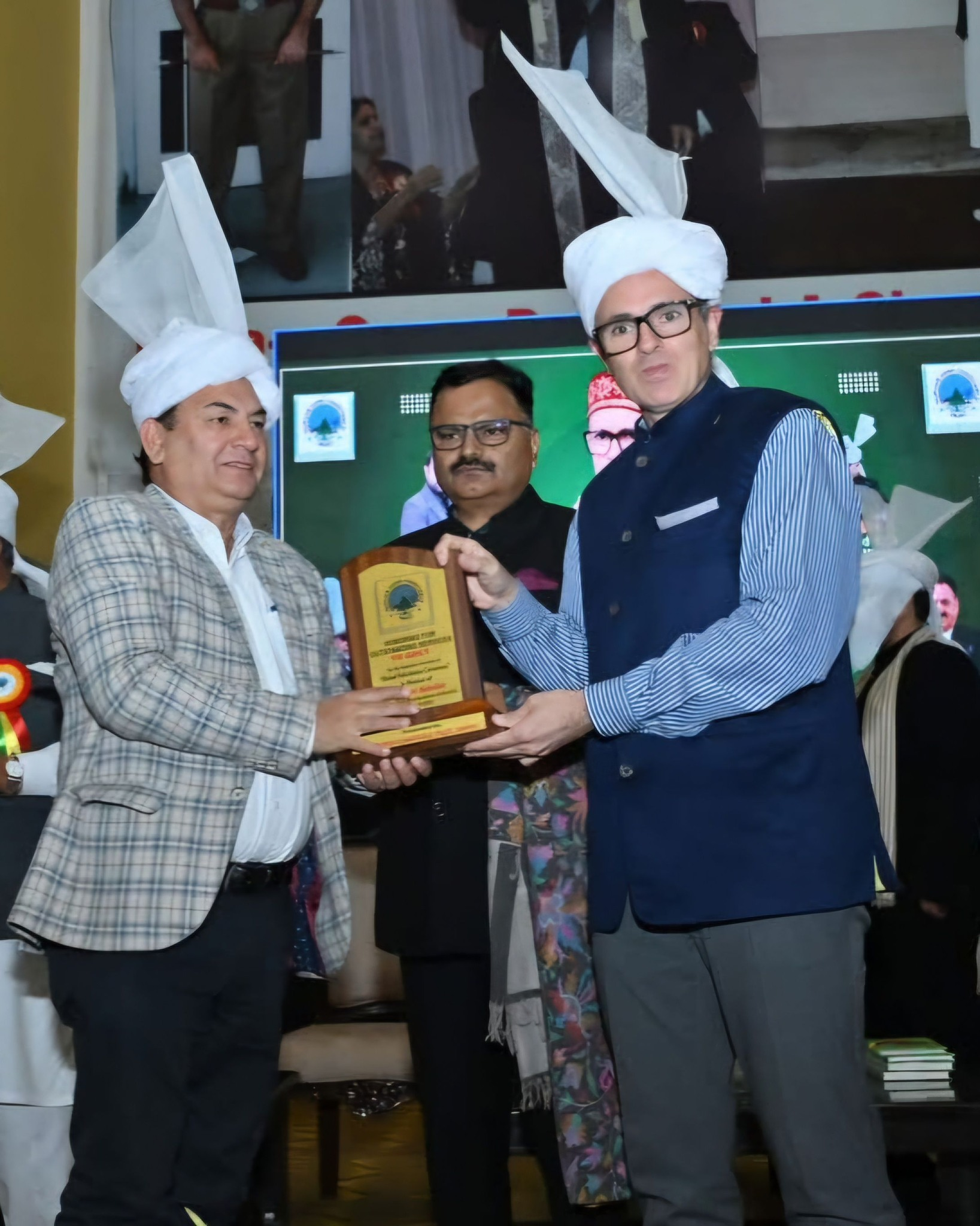
Chief Minister Omar Abdullah giving away the award to Dr. Javaid Rahi at Gurjardesh Charitable Trust, Jammu

- Tribal Rights: A Handbook for Forest Dwellers of Jammu and Kashmir by Javaid Rahi. Jammu: Published with the Support of Tribal Research Institute, J&K. 2025.
- Lok Virso - Gojri Volume-1 by Javaid Rahi Folk Lore of Gujjars. Jammu: Published by Gurjar Desh Trust Jammu. 2000.
- Sheikh Noor-ud-Din Noorani Kalam in Gojri-Renderation by Javaid Rahi. Jammu: Jammu and Kashmir Academy of Art, Culture and Languages, J&K. 2018.
- The Gujjars by Javaid Rahi volume-I & II- History and Culture of Gujjars -Bakarwals of Jammu and Kashmir. Jammu and Kashmir Academy of Art, Culture and Languages, J&K. 2012.
- The Gujjars by Javaid Rahi -Volume-III- Gojri Language ( spoken by Gujjars -Bakarwals of Jammu and Kashmir. Jammu and Kashmir Academy of Art, Culture and Languages, J&K. 2013.
- The Gujjars-Volume=IV- by Javaid Rahi. Jammu and Kashmir Academy of Art, Culture and Languages, J&K. 2014.
- The Gujjars by -Volume-V- Javaid Rahi on Socio-Economic Condition of Gujjars & Bakarwals. Jammu and Kashmir Academy of Art, Culture and Languages, J&K. 2015.
- The Gujjars by Javaid Rahi - Volume- VI- Nomadism & Gujjars -Bakarwals of Jammu and Kashmir. Jammu and Kashmir Academy of Art, Culture and Languages, J&K. 2016.
- The Gujjars Tribe of Jammu and Kashmir by Javaid Rahi. Gulshan Books Srinagar, J&K. 2011.

== Awards and recognition ==
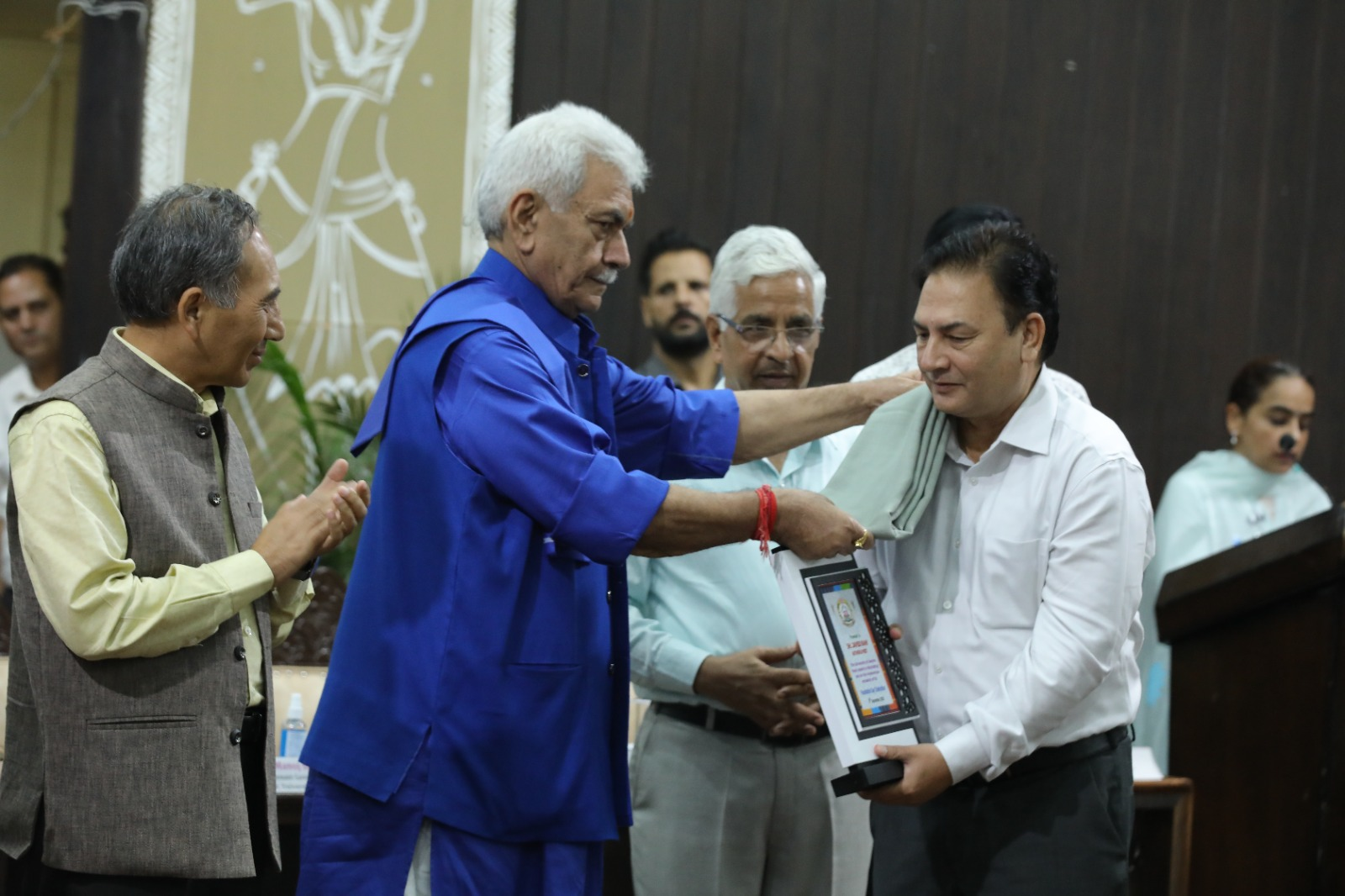
Lt. Governor Manoj Sinha Chancellor of Jammu University felicitating Dr. Javaid Rahi during Foundation day of University -2025

The government of Jammu and Kashmir awarded Javaid Rahi with the State Level "Tribal Award 2022" presented to him by Lieutenant Governor of Jammu and Kashmir Manoj Sinha for his outstanding work in the field of tribal research and social reforms. He was also awarded on first 'National Tribal Pride day' on 15 November 2021, by Tribal Affairs Department, J&K Govt.

- Jagom Memorial National Award’ for his distinguished services in the field of preservation and documentation of intangible tribal folk cultural heritage of Gujjars -Bakarwals of Jammu and Kashmir
- BGSB University felicitates Dr. Javaid Rahi
- Best Book Award (2000) Jammu & Kashmir Academy of Art, Culture, and Languages"
- IIT, Jammu Award of Excellence in Tribal Research.
- University of Jammu honour for lifetime achievements in the field of literature and tribal research.
- Best Play-script Award (1998) in the Gujari language. Jammu & Kashmir Academy of Art, Culture, and Languages."
- National Fellowship (2000) Union Ministry of Tourism and Culture in New Delhi.
