= Zaffar Iqbal Manhas =

Indian politician

Zafar Iqbal Manhas

Member of the Jammu and Kashmir Legislative Council
- In office 2015–2021

Vice president Jammu and Kashmir Academy of Art, Culture and Languages
- Incumbent
- Assumed office 2017

Personal details
- Born: 16 August 1957 (63 years) Jammu and Kashmir, India
- Party: Jammu and Kashmir Apni Party
- Other political affiliations: Jammu and Kashmir Peoples Democratic Party (until 2020)

Zafar Iqbal Manhas is an Indian writer and politician who served as member of the Jammu and Kashmir Legislative Council from 2015 to 2021.

== Life ==
He was an MLC of the Shopian district of Kashmir division. He was a senior member of the Peoples Democratic Party until joining the Jammu and Kashmir Apni Party in March 2020 He is also vice-president of the Jammu and Kashmir Academy of Art, Culture and Languages. He is vocal about the plight of Kashmiris especially displaced Kashmiri Pandits.
