= Pronoun sharing =

Sharing of gender pronouns

A pronoun round in action

Pronoun sharing (a.k.a. pronoun rounds) is the practice of sharing personal gender pronouns. Originally from the LGBTQ community, it has spread into workplace, interpersonal and social media interactions, especially in the biography lines of user accounts. Pronoun sharing has created dialogue around transphobia, respect for LGBTQ people and LGBTQ allyship. Cisgender people who participate in pronoun rounds normalize it for LGBTQ people, and form LGBTQ allyship. The practice may challenge cisnormativity in society, yet it might also force early LGBTQ self-discovery or cause virtue signaling within a society.

== Background ==
The beginning of a user page on Wikipedia. Notice the pronouns in the bottom-right corner of the screenshot.

A custom intended to affirm gender minorities, sharing pronouns is only partially embedded in Western culture. Conversations may begin with "Hello! My name is X, and I go by subject pronoun/object pronoun!" Along with signaling inclusiveness, it intends to mitigate misgendering.

Some organizations have introduced policies facilitating pronoun sharing, particularly in email signatures. These include Workday, Virgin Group, TIAA, Marks & Spencer IBM, the U.S. Air Force, U.S. Marine Corps, BBC, and the United Kingdom Ministry of Defence. This intends to be more attractive and inclusive to transgender and non-binary staff and customers. In the United States, the gap in the usage of pronoun sharing was exacerbated by an edict on January 31, 2025 that forced federal employees to remove it from signature blocks, among numerous anti-LGBTQ bills proposed in the country at the time. The Te Kawa Mataaho Public Service Commission in New Zealand provided guidance on using pronouns in email signatures.

== Effects ==
Within politeness theory, misgendering "loses face"—pronoun rounds help both parties "save face." The respondent saves face by not embarrassing themselves over misusing pronouns. Also, the speaker saves face because their pronouns are cared for. Cisgender people who share pronouns may normalize the practice for transgender and genderqueer individuals to do the same. It could be used to reduce transphobia in a cisnormative society, which is where two genders are considered the "norm." The practice is tied to respect and its various manifestations; a portion of Western people consider it normative.

LGBTQ people still discovering themselves might not have defined pronouns. Sharing those may coax them to confront that part of themselves. Some may also fear being outed through pronoun sharing, which may be the only way to avoid misgendering. Others may find pronoun rounds meddling, awkward, or otherwise intrusive at the start of a conversation.

The practice can sometimes be surface-level instead of genuine in allyship, virtue signaling among those trying to save face for themselves. Transgender employees have simpler perceived intentions when sharing pronouns. Cisgender employees who share pronouns under an established norm will be seen as less of an ally, yet vice-versa if they are the only ones to do so. Workplace managers will generally be seen as more of an ally if they practice it. The most effective pronoun sharing in the workplace is effortless for participants—this is why lists with "prefer not to say" options are preferred over simple rounds. Those who reject the practice see it as an affront to their face, disliking the effort it brings and deriding it as "woke" or "too political."
