= Bali White =

Human rights activism

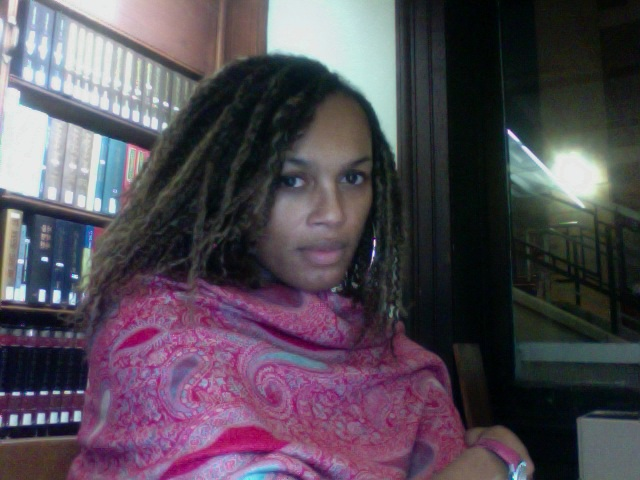
- Bali, 2012
- Born: Indianapolis, Indiana
- Education: African, Environmental, Gender Studies
- Alma mater: Columbia University
- Occupations: Research Fellow, National Institutes of Health
- Known for: Human Rights Activism
- Awards: see below

Bali White (born January 10, Indianapolis, Indiana) is a researcher and writer interested in African, environmental, and gender studies. She is currently a Research Fellow at the National Institutes of Health (NIH). A trans woman, she is also a community organizer and advocate addressing transgender identity, legal, health care and social concerns at the national, state and local levels. Her research and activist work around transgender advocacy and ballroom community youth has been influential in the field of public health. She previously served on the National Advisory Board for the Center of Excellence for Transgender Health and managed the CDC-funded initiatives for young trans women and MSM in the ballroom community at the Hetrick-Martin Institute.

== Background and education ==
White received her Bachelor of Arts magna cum laude in Middle Eastern and Asian Languages and Cultures and a Master of Arts in Climate and Society from Columbia University. During her time at Columbia, she produced a report for the United Nations Environment Programme on international climate change initiatives. White can speak advanced Kiswahili, intermediate Hindi/Urdu and elementary Spanish and French.

White originally moved to New York City on a summer professional ballet scholarship to the Dance Theatre of Harlem. She was introduced to the art of Kathak by her Guru Najma Ayashah. While in Rajasthan on a Hindi/Urdu scholarship in 2005, Bali studied with Rm honorific Shashi Sankhla, guru-sister to Najma under Pandit Kundan Lal Gangani of the Jaipur Gharana.

== Activism and research ==
White worked as a Research Consultant for the New York City Department of Health and Mental Hygiene and assisted in the completion of Transgender Women and HIV Prevention in New York City: A Needs Assessment. White also worked as the Coordinator of Transgender Programming at Housing Works, has been a research assistant for National Development and Research Institutes's Transgender Project and an Assistant Project Director on the House Ball Study (HBS), an ethnographic study of the House/Ball community (a largely NYC queer of color social network) through GMHC.

White works to change the narrative around relationships among transgender women whose sexual partners are often ignored, to the detriment of effective HIV outreach. She fought for a program at Housing Works, where partners come in one night a week. White has also served on the board of directors for the Sylvia Rivera Law Project and has traveled extensively to meet and network with transgender groups abroad including India and East African countries.

White was an invited panelist on "The System. The Reality. The Solution. Honoring and Protecting the Lives of Black Trans Women" during the National Black Justice Coalition's OUT on the Hill event.

=== Publications ===
Scout, Emilia Lombardi, and Bali White. "Letters to the Editors RE: Butch/Femme, F2M, Pregnant Man, TrannyBoi: Gender Issues in the Lesbian Community." Journal of Gay & Lesbian Mental Health, 14.3 (2010): 257–58. Print.

=== Fellowships and awards ===
- White was invited to The White House Office of Public Engagement's A Policy Briefing for Black LGBT Emerging Leaders.
- Commendation of Excellence, City of New York Office of Comptroller, For outstanding work and research on transgender and HIV issues, 2009.
- Trans Empowerment Award, Recognized by Queens-based Latino organization for contributions to transgender community, 2009.
- Office of Multicultural Affairs Award, for service and support to LGBT community at Columbia University, 2006.
- Jon Michael Harrington Humanitarian Award for Activism, for advocacy and commitment to the health and empowerment of the ballroom community, 2002.

== Other ==
- Former editor of People magazine's website and a transgender rights advocate Janet Mock references White in her essay, Growing Up Trans: Sisterhood and Shelter at the Hetrick-Martin Institute,: "Strong women like Ayana, Bali, Danielle, Isis and all of us who bravely prove to live visibly are helping to change the collective portrait of trans people everywhere." Also referenced in Mock's #GirlsLikeUs Pinterest page.
- Author David Valentine references White in his book, Imagining Transgender: an ethnography of a category, Duke University Press, 2007.
- White's work is referenced in the American Journal of Public Health: JPH, Volume 98, Issues 5–8.

== See also ==
- List of Columbia University people
