= Western Gujari =

Form and dialect of the Gujari language

- مَغرِبی گُجری
- Native to: Khyber Pakhtunkhwa, Lagman, Kunar, Nuristan, Kabul
- Region: Afghanistan, Pakistan
- Ethnicity: Muslim Gurjars
- Language family: Indo-European: Indo-Iranian; Indo-Aryan; Western; Rajasthani–Marwari; Rajasthani; Gujari; Western Gujari
- Writing system: Takri, Perso-Arabic script

Language codes
- ISO 639-3: –
- Glottolog: west2375

Western Gujari is a standard form and dialect of the Gujari language. It is spoken in the eastern parts of Afghanistan and various regions of Khyber Pakhtunkhwa, Pakistan. It comprises several minor dialects of Gujari. People who speak Western Gujari can also easily understand Eastern Gujari.

== Dialects ==
Western Gujari consists mainly of following dialects: Afghan Gujari, Hazara Gujari, Kaghan Gujari, and Swat Gujari.

- Afghan Gujari: is spoken in the eastern provinces of Afghanistan.
- Swat Gujari: is spoken in Swat valley of Khyber Pakhtunkhwa.
- Hazara Gujari: is spoken in Hazara region of Khyber Pakhtunkhwa.
- Kaghan Gujari: is spoken in Kaghan valley of Mansehra district, Khyber Pakhtunkhwa.
