= Gau Vigyan Anusandhan Kendra =

Indian research institute

Gau Vigyan Anusandhan Kendra, literally Cow-science research center, is a research institute located in the town of Deolapar near the city of Nagpur in India. The institution focuses on research and development on the role of Cow and its progeny in human life cycle.

== Controversy ==
In May 2019, Gau Vigyan Anusandhan Kendra claimed that cow urine can cure cancer, even though there are no peer-reviewed and endorsed scientific basis.
