= Kala Kendra Jammu =

J&K's Centre for art

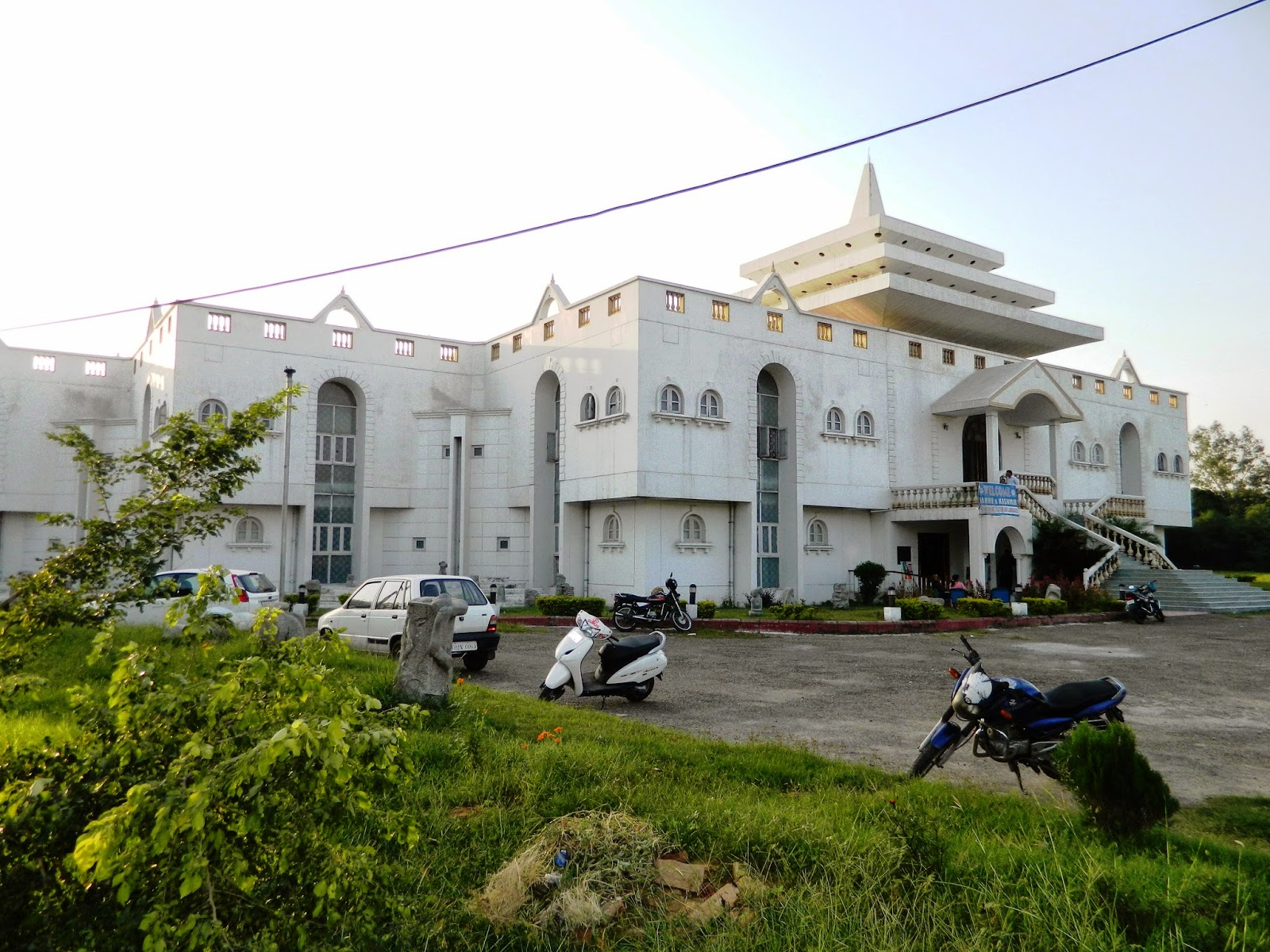
- Kala Kendra Jammu
- Formation: 2006; 20 years ago
- Headquarters: Jammu
- Location: Bikram Chowk, Near Tawi Bridge, Jammu, Jammu and Kashmir, India
- Coordinates: 32.7156°N 74.8596°E
- Region served: India
- Secretary: Javaid Rahi
- Website: culture.jk.gov.in/AboutKK.aspx

Kala Kendra Jammu is an arts institution located in Jammu, India. It was established by the Department of Culture, Government of Jammu and Kashmir, with support from the Ministry of Culture, Government of India, and became operational in 2006. The institution hosts programmes related to visual and performing arts, including exhibitions, workshops, seminars, and cultural events.

== History ==
Construction of the Kala Kendra complex began in 1995 and was completed in 2006. The institution was established to support cultural and artistic activities in the Jammu region.

== Architecture ==
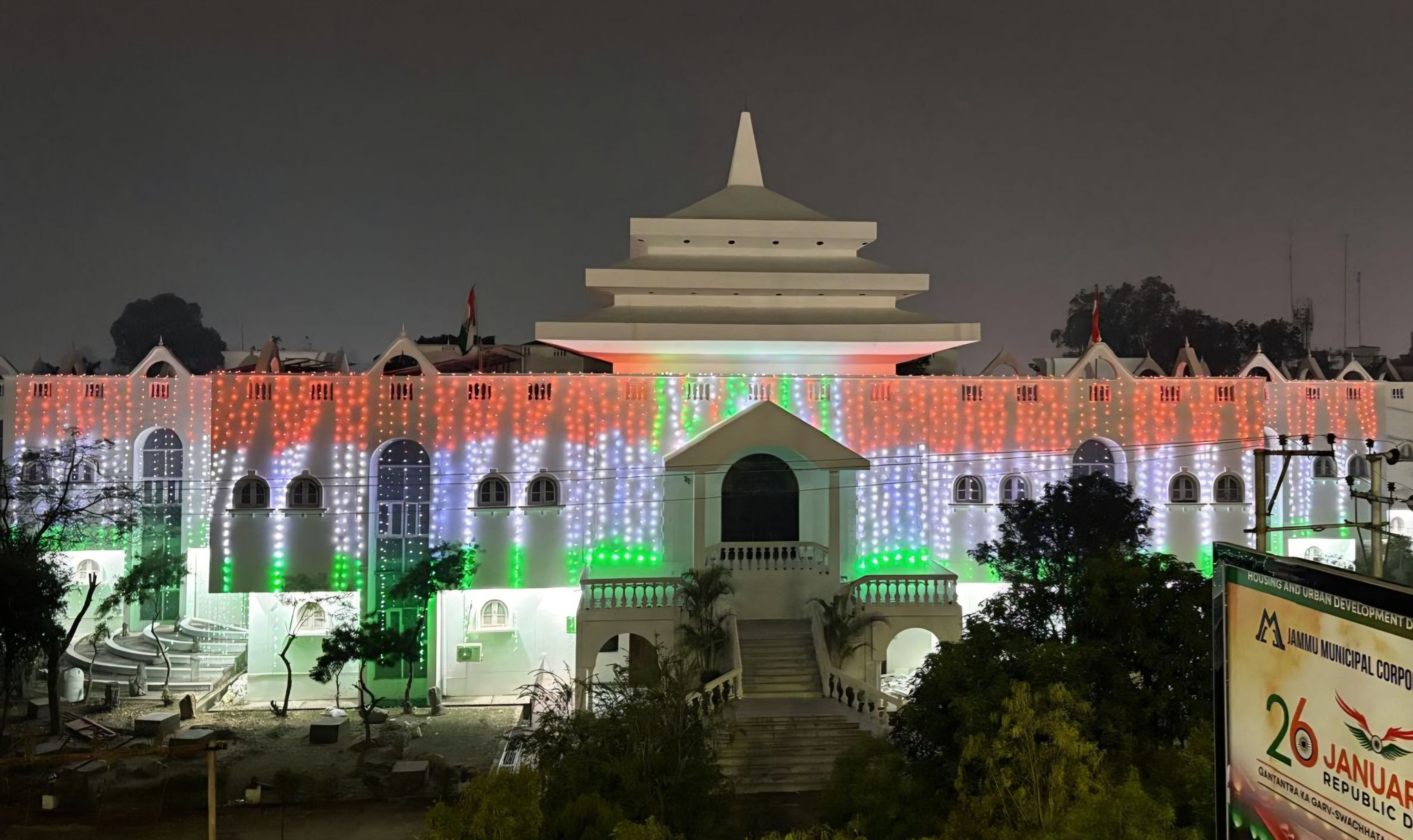
Kendra Gate, Jammu

The building incorporates elements associated with Kashmiri, Dogra, and Ladakhi architectural styles along with modern construction techniques.

== Facilities and activities ==
Kala Kendra includes galleries, studios, a library, and exhibition spaces used for art exhibitions and cultural programmes. The institution has hosted exhibitions related to painting, photography, sculpture, manuscripts, and regional art traditions.

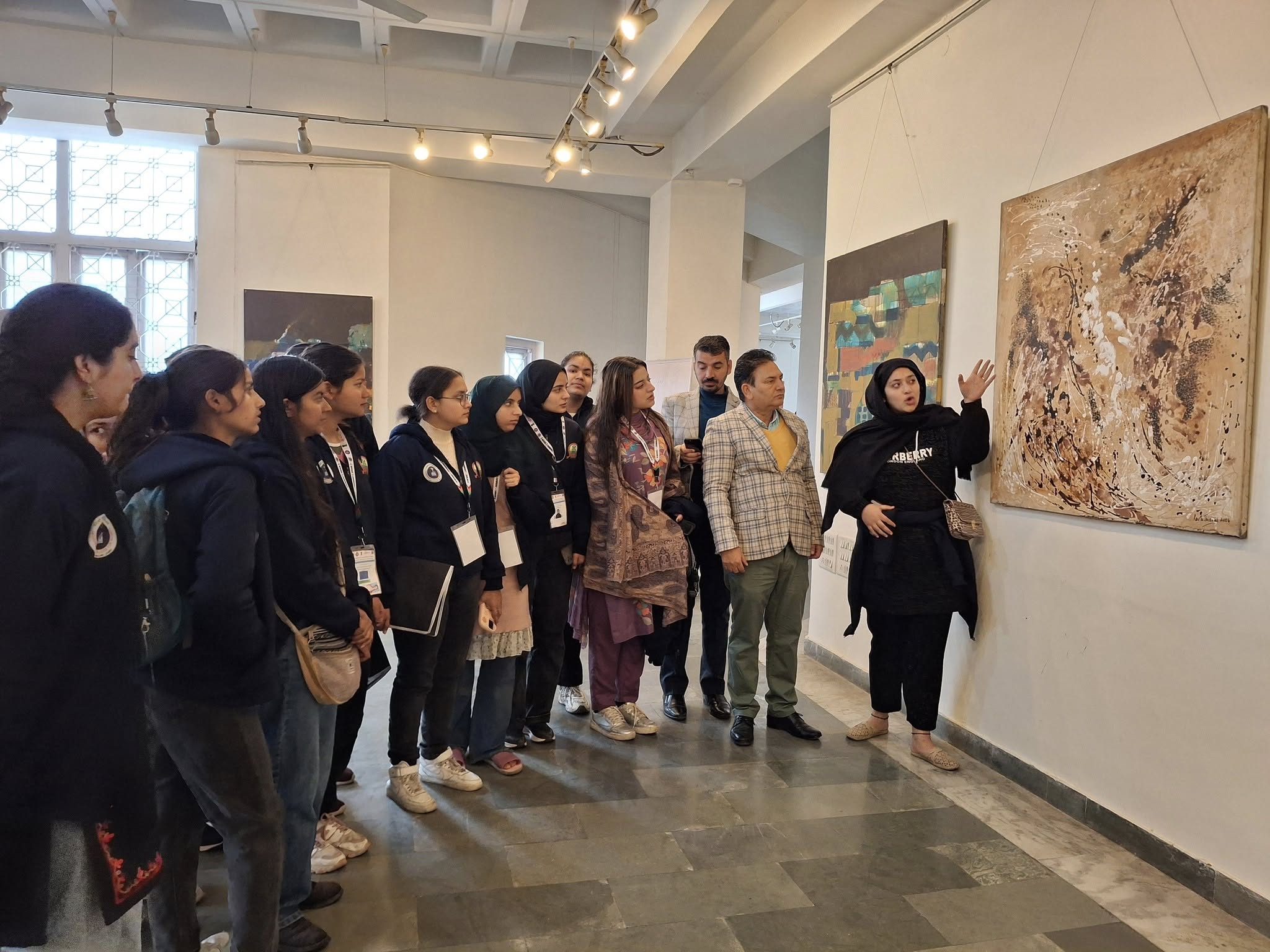
Painting Gallery

== Functionaries ==
The Lieutenant Governor of Jammu and Kashmir serves as the ex-officio president of the society. Javaid Rahi serves as secretary of the institution.

== See also ==
- Jammu and Kashmir Academy of Art, Culture and Languages
- India Habitat Centre
- Jawahar Kala Kendra
