= Preferred gender pronoun =

Third person individual gender pronouns

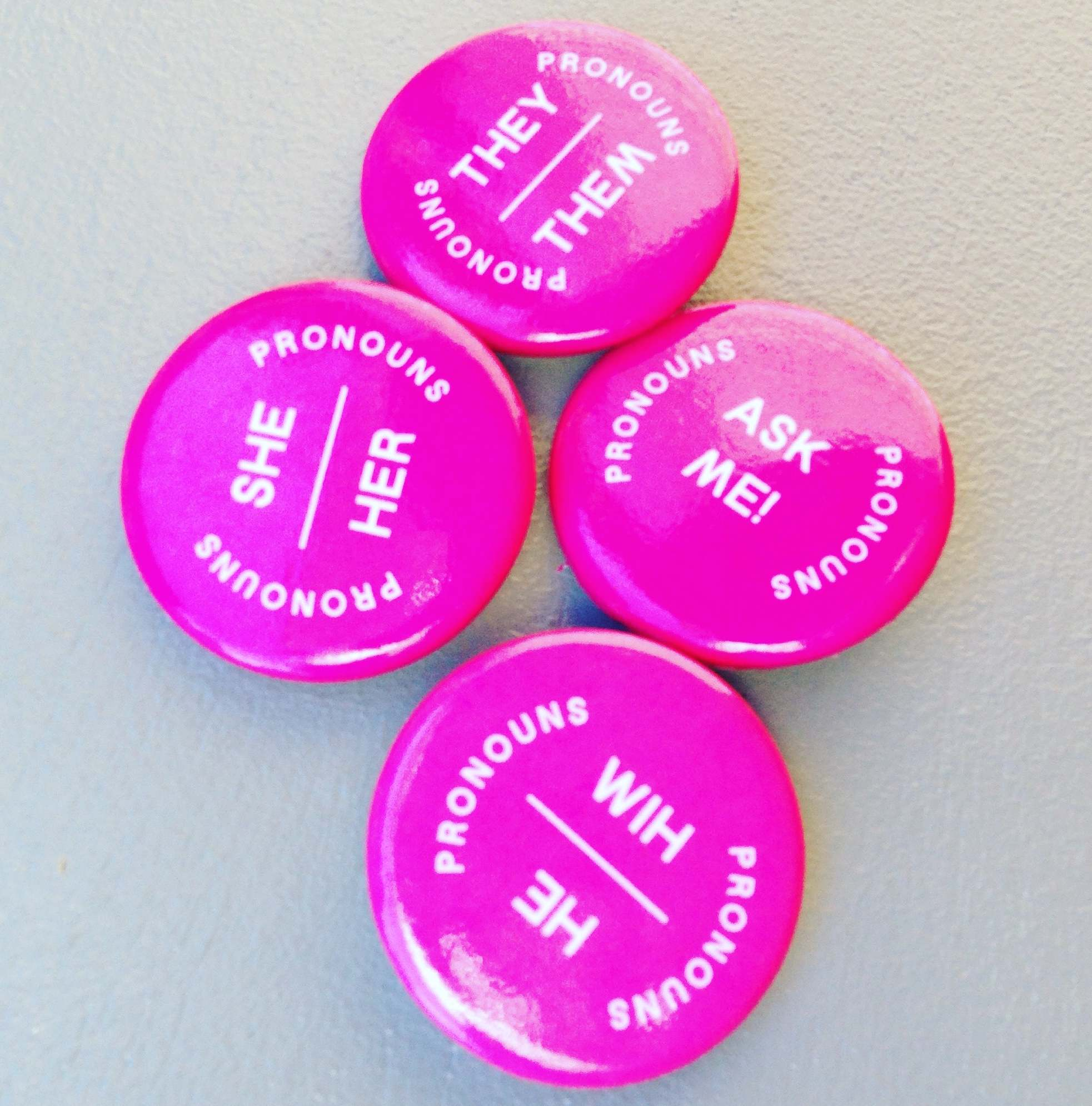
A set of four badges with common preferred gender pronouns, created for the XOXO art and technology festival in Portland, Oregon

Preferred gender pronouns (also called personal gender pronouns, often abbreviated as PGP) are the set of pronouns (in English, third-person pronouns) that an individual wants others to use to reflect that person's own gender identity. In English, when declaring one's chosen pronouns, a person will often state the subject and object pronouns (e.g., he/him, she/her, they/them), although sometimes, the possessive pronouns are also stated (e.g., she/her/hers, he/him/his, they/them/their/theirs). The pronouns chosen may include neopronouns such as ze/zir, xe/xir, and ze/zem.

The American Dialect Society declared "(my) pronouns" as its 2019 word of the year.

== Rationale and use ==
In English, when declaring one's pronouns, a person will often state the subject and object pronouns, for example he/him, she/her, or they/them; sometimes, the possessive pronouns are also stated (she/her/hers, he/him/his, or they/them/their/theirs). A person who uses multiple pronouns (either interchangeably or in different contexts) may list both subject pronouns, for example she/they or they/he.

PGPs have come into use as a way of promoting equity and inclusion for transgender, non-binary and genderqueer people. Their use has been identified by social workers, educators, and medical professionals as both a practical and ethical consideration. Style guides and associations of journalists and health professionals advise use of the pronoun chosen or considered appropriate by the person in question. When dealing with clients or patients, health practitioners are advised to take note of the pronouns used by the individuals themselves, which may involve using different pronouns at different times. This is also extended to the name chosen by the person concerned. LGBTQ advocacy groups also advise using the pronouns and names chosen or considered appropriate by the person concerned. They further recommend avoiding gender confusion when referring to the background of transgender people, such as using a title or rank to avoid a gendered pronoun or name.

The practice of sharing personal gender pronouns has been observed in the LGBT community at least since the early 2000s. By the 2020s, it had become a common practice in social settings and on social media. Social media websites including Twitter, Instagram and LinkedIn have added dedicated pronoun fields for their users' profile pages.

In July 2021, the Pew Research Center reported that 26% of Americans knew someone who preferred pronouns such as they instead of he or she, a rise from 18% in 2018. Some use neopronouns such as xe, ze, ve, tey, and hir.

Some people use more than one set of pronouns, either interchangeably or depending on the situation, and may indicate their personal pronouns as he/they or they/she.

=== Cautions ===
The dean of women at Pomona College, Rachel N. Levin, advised against professors asking students to reveal their PGPs during class introductions, since this could upset those whom the PGP use is supposed to support. The two examples Levin gives include one student who has to confront not passing (in other words, that their gender presentation is not clear to people around them), and another student who does not know which pronouns to request others to use. Christina M. Xiao, a Harvard University student who favored use of PGPs, opposed PGPs being mandatory, saying that making use of PGPs can force people into an uncomfortable situation where they out themselves or feel "incredibly dysphoric".

Steven Taylor, Inclusion and Diversity Consultant for Inclusive Employers, an organization focused on improving workplace inclusion, wrote that while adding pronouns is a way for cisgender people to make non-binary and transgender people more recognized, it should not "be mandated" as an organization might have "trans colleagues who do not feel able to share their pronouns yet". The draft guidance of NIH Sexual & Gender Minority Research Office and the Office of Equity, Diversity, and Inclusion said that disclosing personal pronouns when beginning a conversation might make others "more comfortable to disclose their own and prevent misgendering in the workplace." However, it warned that intentionally refusing to use the correct pronouns of someone is "equivalent to harassment and a violation of one's civil rights" and that pronoun disclosure should be "an individual choice and not a mandate". Analysts Louis Choporis, Gemma Martin, and Bali White, argued that using the incorrect pronouns can be "hurtful, angering, and even distracting". Additionally, Meredith Boe of Inhersight said that companies should not require pronouns in email signatures because it can "make many gender-expansive people uncomfortable".

=== Terminology ===
Many LGBTQ+ style guides such as the GLAAD Media Reference Guide, recommend against referring to pronouns as "preferred", to emphasize that their correct usage is not optional, nor an individual preference. Levin says that "pronouns aren't 'preferred' but simply correct or incorrect for someone's identity."

== Organizational policies ==
Some organizations have introduced policies facilitating the specifying of PGPs, particularly in email signatures. Such companies change policies to encourage sharing of PGPs to be more attractive and inclusive to transgender and non-binary staff and customers. Out & Equal recommended that employers make providing pronouns something that is voluntary rather than required and said that using the right pronouns makes a difference, especially for those who are gender non-conforming and transgender. Blackboard, the online learning tool, outlined the importance of preferred gender pronouns and how to set them within the program. The Te Kawa Mataaho Public Service Commission provided guidance on using PGPs in email signatures and the Australian Government's Style Manual has a sub-section about "pronoun choice".

In July 2021, the Scottish Government proposed its 8,000 civil servants should pledge to include their PGPs in their emails, but an internal poll revealed that more than half were unwilling to do so. Permanent Secretary to the Scottish Government Leslie Evans dismissed the poll results as "disappointing", and a trans woman and political campaigner Debbie Hayton warned of possible consequences of the proposal for trans people, while the anti-trans campaign group For Women Scotland opposed the proposal, calling it "frightening" and "undemocratic".

In August 2021, a letter signed by the Leeds University and College Union and University of Leeds LGBTQ staff and student groups, to Vice Chancellor Simone Buitendijk, called on the University to implement policies to confront transphobia and a hostile environment on campus, including not asking trans people for Gender Recognition Certificates. Toward the end of the letter, the groups suggested an "effective and fit-for-purpose pronouns policy" which included Buitendjik using pronouns in her email signature, and fostering an environment "which encourages the sharing of pronouns" in order to show support for transgender people. In October 2021, the Leeds University and College Union reported that "some limited progress" had been made in response to their letter, but did not mention PGPs.

In August 2021, Scotland's government recommended that schools allow trans students to use their chosen bathrooms, names, and pronouns.

== Legal issues and legal recognition ==
In 2018, medical doctor David Mackereth was not hired by the United Kingdom Department for Work and Pensions (DWP) because he refused to use PGPs for transgender individuals, saying they went against his Christian faith. An employment panel in 2019 ruled that his views were "incompatible with human dignity" and that the DWP had not violated the Equality Act. Mackereth opposed the ruling, as did the Christian Legal Centre (a project of Christian Concern), while the DWP welcomed the ruling. Andrea Williams, of the Christian Legal Centre, claimed that the decision was "the first time in the history of English law that a judge has ruled that free citizens must engage in compelled speech". In response to the decision, Piers Morgan called Mackereth a "bigot" who was "self-righteous" in his beliefs.

In November 2018, the European Commission recommended guidelines emphasizing the "desirability" of using PGPs and gender pronouns that individuals prefer, including by teachers and students in accordance with non-discrimination policies. The report also noted that only schools in Greece, Malta, and Norway were required to respect people's name and PGPs, and stated this appears to be the case in Finland and some regions of Spain.

In March 2021, U.S. federal appeals court judge Amul Thapar ruled that Nicholas Meriwether could sue Shawnee State University for violating "his constitutional rights" after the University disciplined him for failing to use the right pronouns for one of his students, who was transgender, and for violating campus anti-discrimination policies. Asaf Orr, the director of the Transgender Youth Project for the National Center for Lesbian Rights, which represented the student in the case, said that the decision "opens the door to discrimination generally". Andrew M. Koppelman, a Northwestern University Professor of Law, had a similar opinion. John K. Wilson, an editor of the blog of the American Association of University Professors, called the ruling good "for protecting faculty rights" but stated that the religious beliefs of a professor "should not give them special rights to mistreat students" and that professors do not have "full latitude" to determine which students get "respectful pronouns and which will not".

In May 2021, in a written court statement appealing a decision in the case of Forstater v Center for Global Development Europe, Maya Forstater wrote: "I reserve the right to use he and him pronouns for male people. No one has the right to compel others to make statements they don't believe." PinkNews described Forstater as "gender-critical" and as claiming a "right to misgender trans women". In 2019, the judge in the initial case before the employment tribunal, James Tayler, had ruled against her. He had stated that her belief that "sex is immutable and not to be conflated with gender identity" was something "not worthy of respect in a democratic society", called her beliefs "absolutist" and argued that there is "enormous pain that can be caused by misgendering." The Employment Appeal Tribunal judge Akhlaq Choudhury overturned Tayler's judgement, finding that the gender-critical belief that biological sex is real, important and immutable is indeed protected under the Equality Act; still, Choudhury made clear that the ruling did not mean "that those with gender-critical beliefs can 'misgender' trans persons with impunity".

In October 2021, the British Columbia Human Rights Tribunal judge Devyn Cousineau ruled that for those who are non-binary, trans, and not cisgender, "using the correct pronouns validates and affirms they are a person equally deserving of respect and dignity."

The December 2021 update of the Equal Treatment Bench Book advised judges that the use of preferred gender pronouns is "common courtesy". The guidance states that there might be situations in which a witness might refer to a transgender person with "pronouns matching their gender assigned at birth" and that judges should be alert to "how someone prefers to be addressed". It also states that those who are victims of sexual violence or domestic violence should be allowed to use pronouns according to gender assigned at birth "because that is in accordance with the victim's experience and perception of the events".

As of April 2021, U.S. Department of Labor policies on gender identity encourage managers and supervisors to refer to people by the pronouns and names they want to use, stating that continued misuse of pronouns and name may "breach the person's privacy...put them at risk of harm" and in certain circumstances "may be considered harassment". It also advised such people to use gender-neutral language in order to "avoid assumptions about employees' sexual orientation or gender identity" and stated that someone's gender "should not be assumed based on their pronouns". The U.S. Equal Employment Opportunity Commission also suggested that even though misusing the PGPs and name of a transgender employee does not violate Title VII, doing so intentionally and repeatedly "could contribute to an unlawful hostile work environment." EEOC decisions in Lusardi v. Dep't of the Army (2013), Jameson v. U.S. Postal Serv. (2015), and Jamal v. Saks & Co. (2015) concluded that intentional misuse of PGPs created a hostile work environment. The commission also said gender identity harassment may include repeated, and intentional, misuse of PGPs.

In May 2022, the conservative think tank Policy Exchange reported that UK police and courts were referring to suspects by preferred pronoun because gender self-identification had been adopted as policy despite no basis in law. The practice was revealed by Freedom of Information requests made by campaign group Fair Play for Women. The report recommended the ending of "compelled use" of preferred pronouns by police.

In April 2024, the U.S. EEOC issued guidance on gender ID pronouns. Employers refusing to use transgender workers' preferred pronouns or bar them from using bathrooms that match their known gender identity commit unlawful sex-based harassment acts.

In October 2024, a Virginia school board settled with Peter Vlaming, a former high school French teacher who was fired for refusing to use a transgender student's preferred pronouns. Vlaming had used the student's preferred name but avoided third-person pronouns, citing religious reasons. The West Point School Board settled the lawsuit after the Virginia Supreme Court ruled that Vlaming could pursue claims based on the Virginia Constitution's rights to free exercise of religion, free speech, and due process.

In January 2025, the U.S. EEOC filed with courts to withdraw six of its own cases on behalf of workers alleging gender identity discrimination, after President Trump's Executive Order 14168 which states that it is the policy of the United States to recognize two sexes, male and female. The executive order specifically mentioned the April 2024 EEOC guidance on pronouns as one of the documents that should be taken down for promoting "gender ideology". On January 28, Acting Chair Andrea Lucas released a statement saying that this document was one of several that she could not revoke or modify because the majority of the Commission voted to keep the guidance as-is, and Lucas does not have the authority to override that decision. In the same statement, the EEOC noted that they removed an internal app that displayed the user's pronouns to others.

In May 2025, the U.S. District Court for the Northern District of Texas struck down the April 2024 EEOC guidance on LGBTQ+ workplace protections, including gender ID pronouns. The court ruled that the EEOC guidance is inconsistent with Title VII of the 1964 Civil Rights Act and exceeded U.S. Supreme Court precedent.

In January 2026, the U.S. Court of Appeals for the Fourth Circuit affirmed a lower court’s ruling and held that a Maryland school board's policy requiring staff to use transgender students' preferred names and pronouns did not violate a Christian teacher's First Amendment rights to free speech or religion.

== Feminist debate ==
In Gender Hurts (2014), Sheila Jeffreys argues that using pronouns reflecting biological sex is important for feminists, as the feminine pronoun represents respect for cisgender women's historical subordination. She believes trans women cannot hold this status, as they haven't experienced the same oppression, and using feminine pronouns for them masks their retained masculine privilege. In April 2015, radical feminist legal theorist Catharine A. MacKinnon responded, stating that Jeffreys' stance on pronouns is based on a nature-based moral view, which contradicts feminist achievements, especially from the political analysis of gender politics.

== Criticism ==
Some groups and individuals have been critical of the application of PGPs. North Carolina Congressman Greg Murphy opposed the U.S. Air Force allowing PGPs in email signature blocks, calling it "unbelievable", and arguing it detracted from military preparedness. In a dissent in Bostock v. Clayton County, U.S. Supreme Court Justice Samuel Alito said that the majority decision, in which the Court held that Title VII of the Civil Rights Act of 1964 protects employees against discrimination because they are gay or transgender, may lead some to claim that not using their PGP "violates one of the federal laws prohibiting sex discrimination" and believed that the decision would affect how employers "address their employees" and how school officials and teachers talk to students.

In April 2025, White House press secretary Karoline Leavitt stated, "As a matter of policy, we do not respond to reporters with pronouns in their bios" in response to a journalist who queried her for unrelated information. She later stated, "Any reporter who chooses to put their preferred pronouns in their bio clearly does not care about biological reality or truth and therefore cannot be trusted to write an honest story."

== See also ==
- English personal pronouns
- Gender neutrality in English
- Gender neutrality in languages with gendered third-person pronouns
- Singular they
- Third-person pronoun
