= Shashi Sankhla =

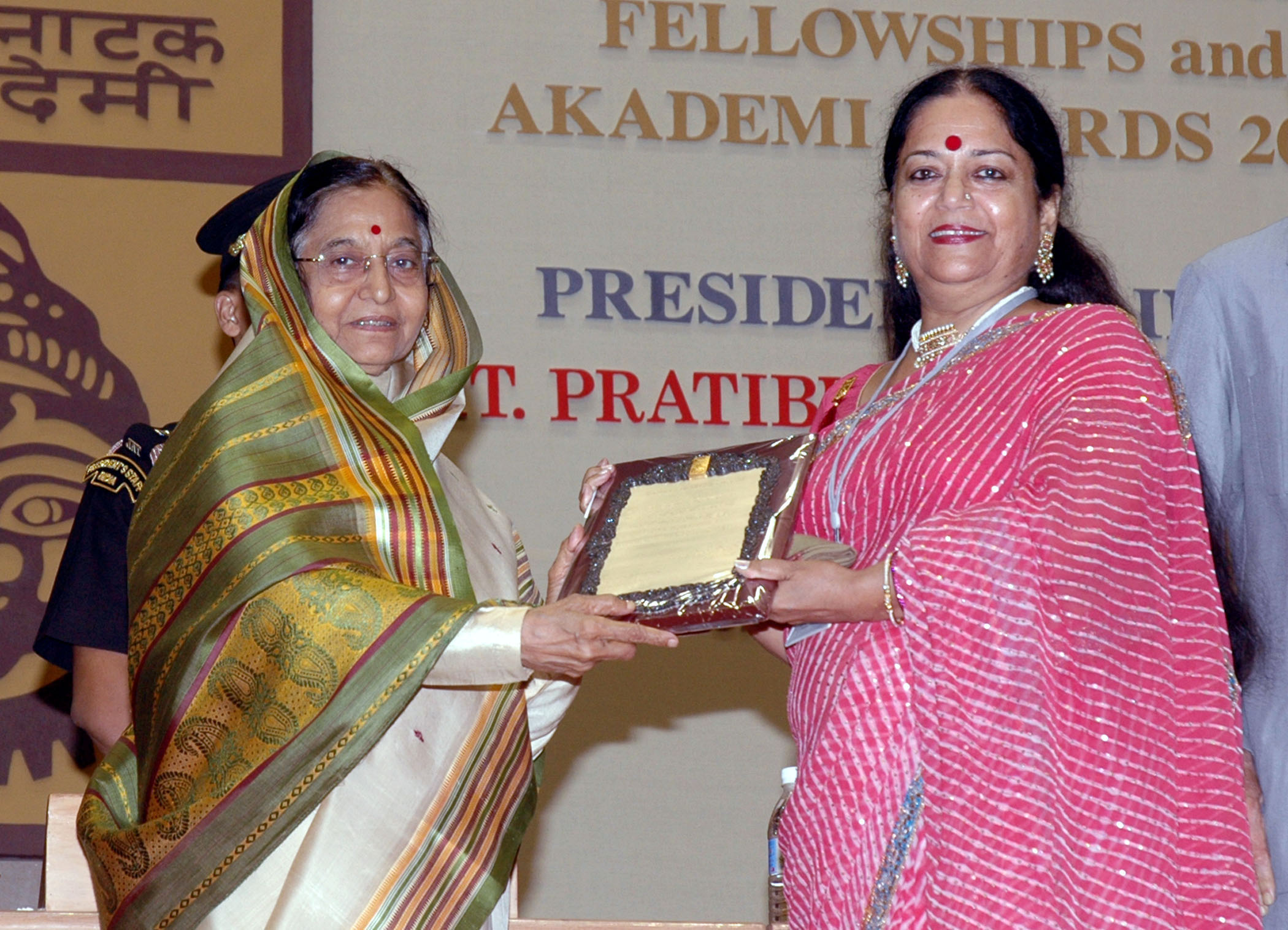
- Former President Pratibha Patil presenting the Sangeet Natak Akademi Award (2008) to Shashi Sankhla (right)

Background information
- Born: 28 October 1948 (age 77); Jodhpur, Rajasthan
- Origin: India
- Genres: Hindustani classical music, Indian classical dance, Kathak
- Occupations: Kathak Guru, Performing Artiste, composer, Artistic Director
- Years active: 1951 - present
- Awards: Sangeet Natak Akademi Award

Shashi Sankhla (born 28 October 1948) is an exponent of the Jaipur gharana of Kathak dance in India. She is a Senior Disciple of Guru Pt. Kundan Lal Gangani Ji. She has been awarded by Sangeet Natak Akademi Awards 2008 in Kathak dance. She was the principal of Jaipur Kathak Kendra.

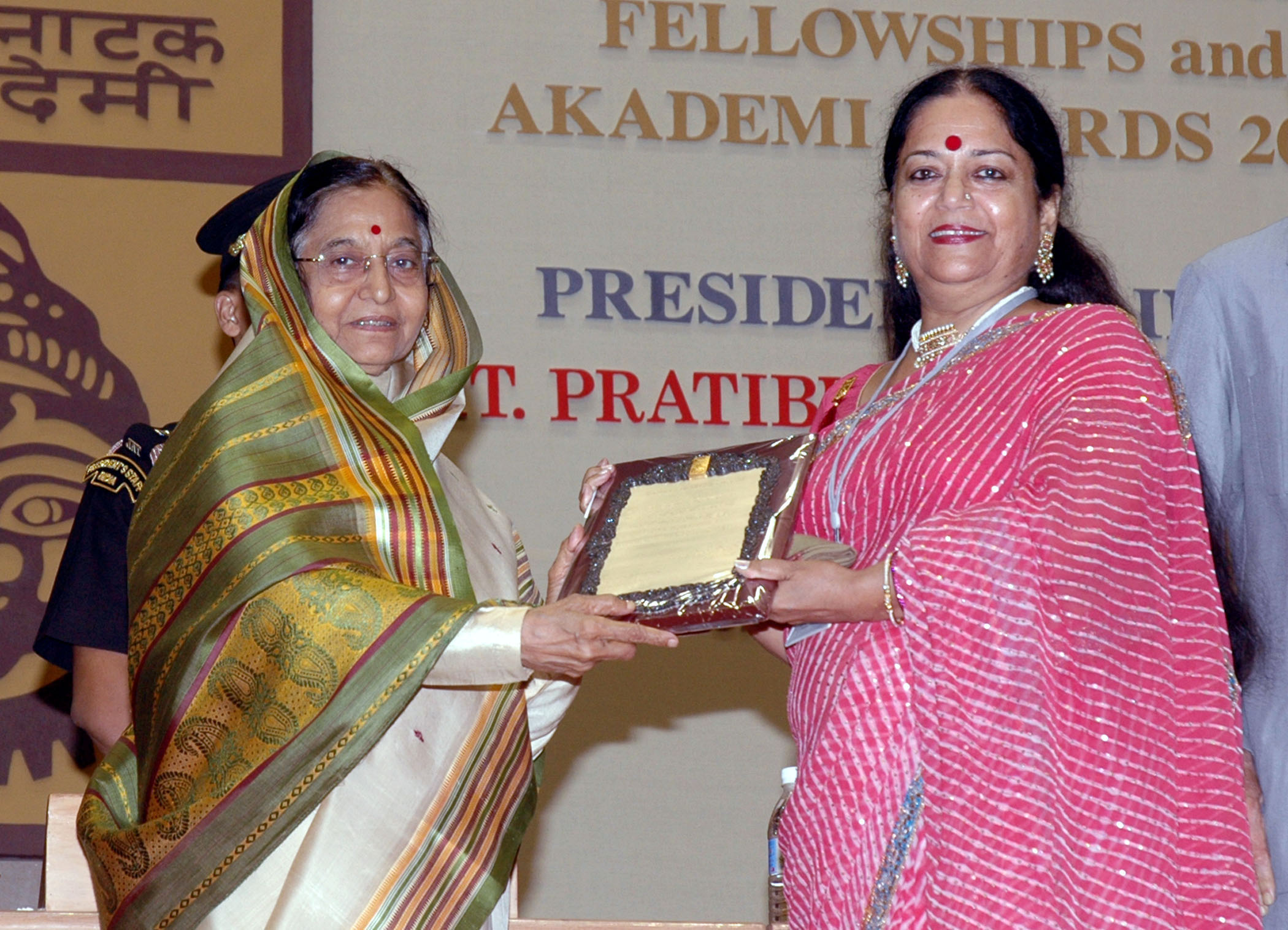
Pratibha Devisingh Patil presenting the Sangeet Natak Akademi Award-08 to Smt. Shashi Sankhla for her contribution to Kathak dance

== Early life and background ==
Born in the suncity Jodhpur, Rajasthan, she initiated her kathak training under the guidance of famous KATHAK Gurus Pandit Mool Chand Gometi ji and was further groomed by Pandit Mohan lal Maharaj ji and later on by Pt. Kundanlal Gangani ji of the Jaipur Gharana. She further enhanced her knowledge in the field of Bharatnatyam by Guru Pratibha Pandit, Baroda vocal music under Pt. Kshirsagar ji and acquired proficiency in playing pakhawaj under Pt. Badrinarayan Pareek ji and folk dances under Master Kasim ji.

== Career ==
She started her career as a teacher at the age of 19, at the Rashtriya Kala Mandal in Jodhpur and then at Jaipur Kathak Kendra as Kathak Nritya Guru in 1978 and served that institution for 28 years and retired as Principal in 2006. Currently she is imparting kathak training at Geetanjali Music Society, Jaipur. She has groomed many Students. Some of her experimental productions conclude pure classical Gayaki like Dhrupad, Khayal, Tarana, Ashtapadis whereas others conclude folk lore and Ballets like Panihari, Kesariya Balam, Chaucer, Rajputani, Gangaur, Ghoomar, RadheyRani, Dashavtaar etc. to name a few.

== Awards and honours ==
Shashi Sankhla has won many accolades, including Sangeet Natak Academy Rajasthan (2001) by then Chief Minister of Rajasthan Shri. Ashok Gehlot and Sangeet Natak Akademi Award, New Delhi in 2008 by then President Of India Smt Pratibha Patil. In addition to this she was conferred the Degree of Doctorate of Philosophy by Inter Cultural Open University, Netherlands (2003). She was also awarded Fellowship by HRD Ministry of Art and Culture on the topic "MAAND" (a semiclassical style of singing of Rajasthan)-"Kathak Nritya Mein Abhinaya Ka Ek Sashakt Madhyam" that fulfills the much needed requirement of "Thumri" of Jaipur Gharana. (2001-2003).

== See also ==
- Indian women in dance
