= Grama Vikas Kendra =

The Nalpathimala Grama Vikas Kendra (GVK) is the extension centre of the Mahatma Gandhi University, in India, at its main campus in Kottayam, Kerala. The major activities of the Grama Vikas Kendra are centered on the village of Nalpathimala. The Kendra was commissioned (on 31 March 1991) by the then Vice Chancellor, Dr. U. R. Ananthamurthy, with a vision ‘to add a chethana dimension to the chinthana preoccupations of the University’.

Being an extension centre of the Mahatma Gandhi University, the Kendra put forth a paradigm for achieving Gramaswaraj through linking the campus with the community. The Kendra is run by the Department of Adult Education, Extension and Field Outreach (ACEEFO) in association with National Service Scheme (NSS). Dr. C. Thomas Abraham was instrumental in forming the idea of Grama Vikas Kendra, and shaping and transforming it as replicable model for campus-community partnership.

== Major Activities ==
=== Campus- Community Partnership ===
The Home-Stay Camp is the major element in the Campus-Community Partnership programme. As per this programme, the students (especially the NSS volunteers) and teachers spend a few days with the village community. During the camp days, these students and teachers stay with the families in the village. The Home-Stay Camp has three major aspects; they are respectively a) educational, b) social and c) developmental.

=== Educational ===
This is a reciprocal programme between the campus and community. Both the campus (the hub of wisdom) and the community (the realm of practical knowledge) can share a lot of valuable information between each other. Through this programme, the community gets informative seminars and training programmes on various subjects of the time. The continuing workshops on Panchayathi Raj, the environment, women empowerment are the notables among these programmes.

=== Social ===
Mahatma Gandhi, in his Constructive Programme, put first priority to the communal unity. For him it was an unbreakable heart unity. Each family in the village accommodates the campers from different a caste, religion and social status. It is helpful to eliminate prejudices about the ‘other’ and ensure national unity. In this way, the Home-Stay camps fulfill the grand vision of the Mahatma. Moreover through the Home-Stay camps, the academic community can understand the needs of society, so that the research programmes can be reoriented in accordance with the expectations of society.

=== Developmental ===
Home-Stay camps create a feeling that the academic community has a constructive role to play in the development of the society. Therefore, manual labour is an important programme in its schedule.

The Kendra has organized 100 Home-Stay camps whereby more than a thousand volunteers across the country have participated in it. In short, the Home-Stay camps could impart its participants a new vision about village, development, and education that are not handled by the classroom syllabus.

== Women Empowerment ==
The Kendra is undertaking the following programme for women empowerment:

1. seminars on the rights of the women;
2. leadership Training programmes through the Self-Help Groups (SHGs);
3. training programmes on masonry, tailoring & embroidery, coir-making, and home management;
4. placement for the trainees who successfully completed the course;
5. and, linking SHGs with the banks.

== Self-Help Groups(SHGs) ==
There are 100 SHGs affiliated with the Kendra. The message of swadeshi is promoted through these SHGs. The major employment programmes of these SHGs are for work in the production of paper-bags, herbal medicines, garments, vermi-compost and curry powder.

== Rural Development Programmes ==
The Kendra plays a major role in the development of the area of its functioning with the help of various governmental and non-governmental agencies, such as Government Poly-technique, NABARD, CWRDM, Department of Soil Conservation, Nirmal-2000, OMMI-HRD project and CHASS. Through the job-training programmes, the unemployment rate in the area could be reduced to a great extent. The Kendra work out construction of sanitary latrines, maintenance of houses, and wells in the village of Nalpathimala. In order to solve the water scarcity problem in the village, the Kendra had chalked out a "water literacy campaign" that could improve awareness about the importance of ferro-cement water tanks, percolation pits and other methods in conserving water.

== Senior Citizens' Forums ==
The Kendra is organizing various programmes for the senior citizens through medical camps, recreation programmes, etc.

== Children's Forums ==
The frequent meetings of the Children' Forums is intended to enrich their leadership quality and creativity. The Kendra provides a remedial education programme for the educationally-backward students to improve their standard.

== Newsletter ==
The Kendra is bringing out a newsletter which carries the major activities of the Kendra.

== Courses ==
There are various courses such as yoga, geriatric social work, and other capacity building programmes held in the Kendra.

== Training Programme in community organization ==
The Kendra is conducting a training programme in community organization. A person who is interested in participatory rural development can apply for the training programme. Selected candidates are appointed as a Grama Vikas Volunteer (GVV). They will be assigned with the charge of various activities at the Grama Vikas Kendra. In addition to that, the Kendra facilitates the GVVs to attend the training programmes organized by the governmental and non-governmental agencies, with regard to rural development.
