= Gujarat State Wide Area Network =

Indian state government internet infrastructure

GSWAN
- Website type: Government Portal
- Available in: Gujarati, English
- Owner: Government of Gujarat
- Website: https://gswan.gujarat.gov.in/
- Commercial: No
- Launched: 2001
- Current status: Online

Gujarat State Wide Area Network (GSWAN) is an end-to-end IP based network designed for the service convergence (Voice, video and Data) on a single backbone, for the state Government of Gujarat, India. The GSWAN was implemented in the year 2001-02.

GSWAN is based on open standards, is scalable and has high capacity Network to carry Voice, Data and Video traffic between designated Government of Gujarat offices at State, District and Taluka levels via a dedicated E1 leased line. The connectivity to end-user is based on standard leased circuits dial-up circuits or using Ethernet ports as appropriate for the individual offices. Single point Gateway with adequate capacity for Internet and provision for connecting other existing Networks have also been set up.

- First tier

Secretariat Center at state capital, Gandhinagar. Various departments and hundreds of subordinate offices located at the state capital are connected to SC horizontally through SCAN (Secretariat Campus Area Network). SCAN had about 7000 Ethernet I/O’s at Gandhinagar and all these I/Os are interconnected with GSWAN for information exchange. 300 GSWAN phone connections provided to various offices at Secretariat for direct voice communication to any GSWAN node in the state.

- Second Tier

Constitutes District Centers, located at district collector’s office and multiple district level other offices connected with DC horizontally. All the 24 districts, except Gandhinagar, are connected on 2 Mbit/s (E1) leased lines with the Secretariat Center. The dialup access is given to all those Government offices in district, Taluka, that are not considered for direct integration on Ethernet / leased / OFC / Wireless.

- Third Tier

Constitutes Talukas Centers, located at Taluka Mamlatdar’s office and Taluka Development Office provision are kept for connecting Taluka level other offices horizontally. All 225 Talukas are connected to District Centers. (211 on 64 Kb leased lines, and rest of 14 Talukas on Ethernet).
