= State data centre =

Indian government data centres

State Data Centres (SDC) are multiple data centers set up in various states of India to provide fundamental IT infrastructure for various eGovernance programs being run as part of National eGovernance Plan of India. The main purpose of these centres is to provide a physical facility for hosting various state level e-government applications similar to what National Informatics Center (NIC) provides to the national level applications. The SDC project was approved in January 2008 as a part of the National eGovernance Plan.

== Introduction ==
The State Data Centres project is meant to build up state's services, applications and infrastructure on a common platform in all the states and union territories of India. SDCs project is planned to work together with State Wide Area Network project to achieve its goals. A SDC will work as a physical storehouse of public and private data which will act as a centralized database for various eGovernment applications. In addition to this, a SDC will provide basic IT infrastructure for implementing server side technologies viz. systems like web servers, application servers and database servers etc. for different applications.

== Services ==
The following types of services are expected to be provided at the SDCs:
1. Application and web hosting.
2. 24*7 support for data and application availability.
3. Centralized network and database management.
4. Security of private data.
5. Backup & archival Services.

== Implementation ==
The implementation guidelines have been stated very clearly by the government. The guidelines can be found at http://www.mit.gov.in/content/policy-guidelines-state-data-centre-sdc-dpl-data. The key considerations of the project are:
1. Scalability
2. Availability
3. Security
4. Manageability
5. Reliability
6. Migration from Distributed to Centralized environment
7. Interoperability
8. Compliance to Standards

== Current Progress ==
Since its inception the union Government of India has spent a total budget of Rs. 1378.50 Crores in various states of India. Typically a data centre takes 9–12 months for setting up and getting into operation. As per the data received from the official sources, currently various states of India are in different phases of the project realisation. As many as 14 States have been successful in making the SDCs operational until date. Some of these states include Gujarat, West Bengal and Tripura. Furthermore, SDCs are under implementation in some of the other states like Maharashtra, Uttar Pradesh and are expected to become functional by the end of 2011.
