= Tribal Research and Cultural Foundation =

Indian research institute and foundation

Tribal Research and Cultural Foundation, is a community-supported nonprofit organization set up in 2000 with the objective to project tribal issues before authorities and to promote ethno- Cultural aspects of tribes. The Foundation was established to work on Gujjars studies and nomadic research in Jammu and Kashmir (union territory).

The primary objective of the Foundation is to bring tribal issues into the public and policy domain while safeguarding their distinct identity. It works to promote tribal languages like Gojri, preserve folklore and oral traditions, and support academic and field-based research on tribal history, lifestyle, and socio-economic conditions. Through its efforts, the organisation aims to strengthen cultural continuity and awareness among younger generations within these communities.

The Foundation has undertaken a wide range of activities, including the publication of books, dictionaries, and research works related to tribal languages and culture. It has also organized seminars, conferences, literary gatherings, and cultural events in both urban and remote tribal areas. These initiatives help provide a platform for tribal voices and encourage dialogue between communities, scholars, and institutions.

In addition to cultural and academic work, the Foundation has also contributed to raising awareness about the constitutional rights of Scheduled Tribes in Jammu and Kashmir. It has been associated with advocacy efforts concerning the implementation of laws such as the Forest Rights Act, 2006, and other safeguards meant for tribal communities. Through such initiatives, it has played a role in connecting grassroots tribal populations with broader legal and institutional frameworks. Although its field activities have reportedly reduced in recent years, the Foundation continues to contribute through research, documentation, and intellectual engagement. Its work remains significant in preserving the heritage and identity of tribal communities and in highlighting their issues at regional and national levels.

== Preservation of folklore of Gujjars ==
The Tribals have a rich tradition of folk-songs and folk-tales. These treasure houses of folk wisdom are declining and are feared to vanish with the passage of time. Hence, there was an emergent need to collect, document and preserve the folk treasure of songs and tales. With a view to meet this objective, the Tribal Research and Cultural Foundation has undertaken documentation of tribal culture and artifacts.

== Dictionaries in Gojri ==
With the advent of literature, words acquired new meanings as well as usage. To facilitate the common reader to have a peep into the world of unknown words, the publication of dictionaries became essential. Most of our tribal regional languages started producing literature on a regular basis, uninterruptedly, since forties only, therefore, dictionaries were not available in these languages. Foundation published 2 Dictionaries Folk-lore Dictionary of Gujjar Tribe, Hindi Gojri Dictionary in 2000–2004.

== Encyclopedia of Himalayan Gujjars ==
Keeping in view the importance of encyclopedia in the development of a language, Tribal Research and Cultural Foundation has taken in hand the publication of Encyclopaedia of Himalayan Gujjars in 2000 and first volume of this encyclopedia have been published in 2003 covering the following field of research:- a) Gujjar Archaeology & Architecture b) Gujjar Archeology, Architecture & Coins c) Gujjar Handicrafts d) Gojri Language & Literature

== Seminars and conferences ==
Most of Tribal areas are nearly inaccessible. The tribal writers and artists residing in these far flung areas did not have the means and access to keep them abreast of changing trends on the literary scene. To bring writers of the State in close contact with one–another, Tribal Research and Cultural Foundation organized Mushairas, Seminars, Literary Conferences, Sham-i-Afsanas, Sham-i- Ghazals, and Literary Get-togethers at in villages.

== Art conservation ==
To conserve and preserve priceless tribal artifacts, manuscripts, miniature paintings and other artifacts Tribal Research and Cultural Foundation has to established Museum at Jammu in future.

== Field Activities ==
The Foundation has closed its field and collaborative activities in 2014. However, research and study work is going on about the tribes without help from Government.

== Similar links ==
- Gurjardesh Charitable Trust, Jammu
