= Jammu and Kashmir Academy of Art, Culture and Languages =

Cultural organisation in India

Jammu and Kashmir Academy of Art, Culture and Languages (JKAACL)
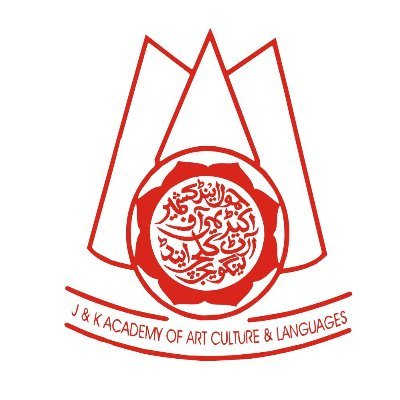
- Abbreviation: Cultural Academy
- Formation: 1958; 68 years ago
- Headquarters: Canal Road Jammu - Lalmandi Srinagar J&K,
- Location(s): Jammu and Srinagar, India
- Region served: India
- Publication: Sheeraza and other Publications in English, Hindi, Urdu, Kashmiri, Dogri, Gojri, Punjabi, Pahari and Shina.
- Parent organisation: President Office JKAACL J&K
- Website: culture.jk.gov.in/ArtandCulture.aspx

The Jammu and Kashmir Academy of Art, Culture and Languages (JKAACL) is the premier cultural institution of the Union Territory of Jammu and Kashmir. It promotes the languages, literature, Folk, art, theatre , music , dance and other aspects of culture of different regions of J&K. The academy was established in 1958 by the Government of Jammu and Kashmir under Section 146 of the Constitution of Jammu and Kashmir as an organisation of autors , artists and intelectuals.It functions as an autonomous cultural body even after the reorganisation of the former State in 2019 into two UTs.

In 2021, the Government registered the academy as a society under the Societies Registration Act, 1860. The academy is governed by the General Council, Central Committee, and Finance Committee. The lieutenant governor of Jammu and Kashmir is the president of the society.

== Objectives ==
The academy promotes Kashmiri, Dogri, Urdu, Hindi, Gojri, Pahari, Punjabi, Badherwahi, Shina and other regional languages. The academy publishes books, journals, dictionaries, translations, and research works.

It organizes literary festivals, seminars, theatre performances, music and dance programmes, art exhibitions, and cultural events. The academy honours writers, artists, scholars, and performers through awards and fellowships. The society's official objectives include to promote Culture, Languages, co-operation, translation, and cultural exchange in arts and culture; to publish writings on arts, culture, and related subjects, including encyclopedias and to promote events and awards.

== Main functionaries ==
Among the luminaries who have played pivotal roles in the academy's journey are figures like Mohammad Yousuf Taing, Balwant Thakur, Javaid Rahi and Zaffar Iqbal Manhas.

== Jurisdiction ==
The jurisdiction of the academy covers the entirety of Jammu and Kashmir. It is the central agency in the matters of interaction and co-operation between Jammu and Kashmir and the Central and other State Academies. It involves itself in the following areas:

1. Language and literature
2. Music, dance, and other performing arts, including theatre
3. Visual, creative and fine arts

The Jammu and Kashmir Academy of Art, Culture, and Languages (JKAACL) operates through two Divisional Offices—one representing the Jammu Province and the other representing the Kashmir Province. These offices play a crucial role in promoting and preserving the region's linguistic and cultural diversity.

== Decentralisation of JKAACL ==
As per the Central Committee decssion 2001 the JKAACL decentralised its function providing powers to Divisional Office Jammu/ Kashmir in promotion and development of the following languages:

- Divisional Office Jammu
1. Hindi
2. Dogri
3. Gojri
4. Punjabi
5. Bhaderwahi
- Divisional Office Kashmir
1. Urdu
2. Kashmiri
3. Pahari
4. English
5. Shina

Through literary programmes, publications, research activities, and cultural events, both offices work towards safeguarding the rich multilingual heritage of Jammu and Kashmir.

== Location and management ==
The academy has its main offices at Canal Road, Jammu, opposite the science college. The other offices are at Lalmandi, Srinagar, Rajouri, Kathua, and Doda.

== See also ==
- Kala Kendra Jammu
- India Habitat Centre
