= Gujari =

Indo-Aryan Language

- گُجری; गुर्जरी; 𑚌𑚰𑚤𑚶𑚑𑚤𑚯
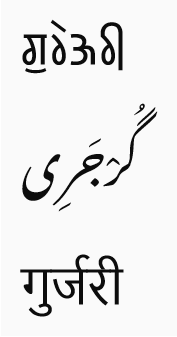
- Gurjari written in Takri, Perso-Arabic script (middle) and Devanagari (bottom)
- Native to: India, Pakistan, Afghanistan
- Region: India; Gujarat; Haryana; Himachal Pradesh; Jammu and Kashmir; Madhya Pradesh; Maharashtra; Punjab; Rajasthan; Uttar Pradesh; Uttarakhand; Pakistan; Azad Kashmir; Gilgit-Baltistan; Khyber Pakhtunkhwa; Afghanistan; Nuristan; Nangarhar; Kunar
- Native speakers: 20 million (2018-2022 estimates) (Note: Gujari (Gojri) is approximately spoken by 20 millions individuals, mostly by Muslim Gurjars of Afghanistan, Pakistan and northern India.)
- Language family: Indo-European: Indo-Iranian; Indo-Aryan; Western; Rajasthani languages; Gujari
- Dialects: Western Gujari; Eastern Gujari; Van Gujjari; Bakerwali; Banihari; Kunhari Gujari; Chitrali Gujari; Kaghan Gujari; Swat Gujari; Punchi Gujari; Other dialects
- Writing system: Takri, Perso-Arabic script, Devanagari

Language codes
- ISO 639-3: gju
- Glottolog: guja1253
- Gujari speakers in different districts of Indian states, northern areas of Pakistan and eastern provinces of Afghanistan.

Gujari (Note: Also Gurjari, Gojri, Gujri, Gojari, Gujari, Gujjari, Gojari, Gujuri, Gogari, Guzari, Gurjar, Gujer, Gujar, Gojar.) (English: /ɡʌjæri/ GUU-JAH-REE; گُجری, गुर्जरी, 𑚌𑚰𑚤𑚶𑚑𑚤𑚯) is an Indo-Aryan language. It is classified as part of the Rajasthani languages under the Western Indo-Aryan language subfamily. It is spoken by Gurjars in the northern parts of India and Pakistan, as well as in the eastern parts of Afghanistan. Gujari is written in the Perso-Arabic script and Devanagari, both are used in India while Perso-Arabic is used in Pakistan.

Gujari is the second most widely spoken language in both India-administered Jammu and Kashmir (after Kashmiri), and Pakistan-administered Azad Kashmir (after Pahari-Pothwari). It is spoken by 19% of the population in Azad Kashmir and by 9.5% of the population in Jammu and Kashmir.

It is also spoken in other areas of northern Pakistan including the northern half of Khyber Pakhtunkhwa (where it ranks after Pashto, Hindko, and Saraiki in number of speakers) and in Gilgit-Baltistan; and northern and western India including, Gujarat, Haryana, Himachal Pradesh, Madhya Pradesh, Maharashtra, Punjab, Rajasthan, Uttar Pradesh and Uttarakhand.

In 1999 the government of India-administered Jammu and Kashmir recognized Gujari by including the language in the sixth schedule of the former state constitution. On 27 October 2025 the Provincial Assembly of Khyber Pakhtunkhwa made Gujari the sixth officially recognized language in the provincial assembly. In March 2025 the government of Pakistan-administered Azad Kashmir included Gujari an optional subject in the course curriculum for grades sixth and eight.

== Origin and history ==
=== Origin ===
Some scholars have linked the Gujari language's origins and characteristics to the Gurjar Apabhraṃśa, a language form described by ancient Sanskrit grammarians.

In the Indian subcontinent, the language known as "Indik" eventually evolved into Sanskrit and became the language of the elite. As Sanskrit spread, it branched out into various regional languages, known as Prakrit or Indo-Aryan languages.

Rita Kothari noted that Gurjar Apabhramsa was used as a literary language by the 12th century, with references in poet Bhoja's work (1014 AD). Ancient Indian philosopher Patanjali's classification described Apabhramsa as languages spoken in northern India. However, the term Apabhramsa is broadly applied in Indology, making it unlikely that Gujari was specifically known as Apabhramsa or directly descended from Gurjar Apabhraṃśa.

=== History ===
Significant progress has been made in standardising Gujari writing notably with the publication of "Gojri Grammar" by T. Grahame Bailey in 1905 and with the publication of a six volume book of Gujari dictionary by the Jammu and Kashmir Academy of Art, Culture and Languages (JKAACL) in 1992 which was put together over a period of ten years.

In 1992 Hallberg and O'Leary carried out a comprehensive study of the Gujari dialects spoken by Gujjars in Pakistan and Azad Kashmir and classified them into Eastern and Western dialect groups on the basis of lexical similarity and intelligibility.

In 1997 Hugoniot and Polster also examined the Eastern Gujari dialect of Dodhi Gujjars of the Indian states of Himachal Pradesh, Uttar Pradesh and Jammu and Kashmir.

It was also officially declared as a mother tongue in 2006 with the admission of Gujari as a mother tongue by the Jammu and Kashmir Board of School Education (JKBOSE).

According to Bukhari's (2007) observations, Gujari has been significantly shaped by other Indo-Aryan languages, including Urdu, Hindko and Pahari.

In March 2023, a Gujjar organisation Gujjar Qaumi Movement (GQM) petitioned the Peshawar High Court for included Gujari in the census of 2023.

In March 2025, Government of Azad Kashmir included Gujari language as an optional subject in the curriculum of Classes 6 and 8.

In May 2025 Gojri language books by Professor Muhammad Naseer Miskeen in the Gojri language were republished by Gandhara Hindko Academy in Peshawar and Gojri short stories in Urdu in "Gojri Afsaaney" and "Sheesho", comedy poetry.

Gujari was admitted as a local language at the Provincial Assembly of Khyber Pakhtunkhwa on 27 October 2025 (unanimously) becoming the sixth language of the provincial legislative assembly.

== Literary traditions ==
Gujari folklore is very large, including songs, ballads and folktales, known as Dastans. Hundreds of folk songs have been recorded and published, including "Nooro", "Tajo", "Nura Beguma", "Shupiya", "Kunjhdi", "Mariyan".

Taukeer Alam narrating a folklore in Van Gujjari

A modern tradition of creative writing encompasses poets such as Sain Qadar Bakhsh, Noon Poonchi, and others. Others such as Mian Nizam ud Din, Khuda Bakhsh Zar, Zabih Rajourvi, Shams ud Din Mehjoor Poonchi, Mian Bashir Ahmed, Javaid Rahi, Rafiq Anjum, Milki Ram Kushan, Sarwari Kassana, Naseem Poonchi have also made remarkable contributions to Gujari through poetry, prose and criticism.

== Classification and dialects ==
Gujari is classified as part of the Rajasthani languages group in the Indo-Aryan language family. Glottolog further classifies it within the Mewati branch of Rajasthani languages.

The Gujari language have two major dialects Eastern Gujari and Western Gujari. Both of these two dialects spoken in Pakistan: in the areas of Gilgit-Baltistan, Khyber Pakhtunkhwa and Azad Kashmir. These two dialects share approximately 64% to 94% lexical similarities.

=== Western Gujari ===
Western Gujari is mainly spoken by the Gurjars in the Hazara region and other districts of Khyber Pakhtunkhwa. These districts include Battagram, Swat, Dir, Haripur, Mansehra, and Black Mountain. It is also spoken in many areas of eastern Afghanistan. Western Gujari is easily understand for the speaker of eastern Gujari.

=== Eastern Gujari ===
Eastern Gujari is mostly spoken in the Shinkari area of eastern Mansehra and also in Nagaki, Kakul, and Sarban union councils located near Abottabad district of Hazara region. It is also mixed with northern Hindko and Pahari languages.

=== Other dialects ===
==== Van Gujari ====
Taukeer Alam introducing himself in Van Gujjari

Van Gujjari is a variety of the Gujari language spoken by the Van Gujjars of Uttarakhand and Himachal Pradesh.

==== Bakerwali ====
Bakerwali Gujari is mainly spoken by the Bakarwal Gujjars in Indian administrated Jammu and Kashmir and Himachal Pradesh.

==== Banihari ====
Banihari Gujari is mainly spoken by the Dhodhi or Banihara Gujjars of Jammu and Kashmir. It is closely related to Dogri, Kashmiri and Gujari spoken in various villages of Kashmir.

=== Regional dialects ===
- Kunar Gujari: Kunar or Kunari Gujari is mainly spoken by the Gujjars of Kunar province in Afghanistan.
- Chitral Gujari: Chitrali Gujari is mainly Gujari spoken in the Chitral valley and Ashriki area of Chitral.
- Swat Gujari: It is spoken by the Gujjars of Peshmal and Raguhu valleys of Swat district.
- Gilgit Gujari: It is spoken in Naltar Valley and Bala in Gilgit-Baltistan.
- Kaghan Gujari: It is poken mainly in Mittikot village in Kaghan Valley of Khyber Pakhtunkhwa.
- Poonch Gujari: Mainly spoken in Mendhar and Poonch district of Jammu and Kashmir, India.
- Gujaranwala Gujari: It is mainly spoken by the Gujjars migrated from Agra district of Uttar Pradesh, India.
- Dir Gujari: Mainly spoken in Sheringal area in the Panjkora Valley of Khyber-Pakhtunkhwa.
- Southern Hazara Gujari: It is spoken in Tarchatti in the Hazara region of Khyber-Pakhtunkhwa.
- Central Azad Kashmir Gujari: Mainly spoken in Trarkheli area of Azad Kashmir.
- Southern Azad Kashmir Gujari: Mainly spoken in the Kotli district of Azad Kashmir.
- Maharashtrian Gujari: also known Khandeshi Gujari or Ded Gujari, Is a dialect of Gujari spoken by Gurjars in the Marathwada, and Khandesh regions of Maharashtra. It is mixed with local languages like Marathi, Ahirani, Bhili and Powari.

== Geographical distribution ==
=== India ===
==== Jammu and Kashmir ====
Gujari speaking Gujjars and Bakarwals are concentrated in all districts of Jammu and Kashmir and also in Kargil district of Ladakh. As per 2011 census in Jammu and Kashmir there were 11,35,196 Gujari speakers and 34,858 were Khandeshi-Gujari (also known Ded-Gujari) speaking individuals. Total their population was 1,170,054.

There are approximately 8 million Gujari speakers in Jammu and Kashmir.

==== Population ====
Districts wise Gujari speakers per 2011 census in Jammu and Kashmir.

2011 census
| Districts | Gujari | Percentage |
|---|---|---|
| Rajouri | 2,21,553 | 35.17% |
| Kishtwar | 33,127 | 14.36% |
| Kupwara | 80,163 | 9.21% |
| Baramulla | 34,750 | 3.45% |
| Pulwama | 22,189 | 3.96% |
| Shupiyan | 23,425 | 8.8% |
| Anantnag | 1,23,606 | 11.46% |
| Kulgam | 26,827 | 6.32% |
| Bandipore | 34,586 | 8.82% |
| Badgam | 23,912 | 3.01% |
| Srinagar | 8,935 | 1% |
| Udhampur | 28,770 | 5.18% |
| Jammu | 59,048 | 3.86% |
| Samba | 13,766 | 4.32% |
| Ganderbal | 61,070 | 20.21% |
| Poonch | 1,86,658 | 40.39% |
| Doda | 30,200 | 7.53% |
| Ramban | 30,654 | 12.18% |
| Reasi | 77,674 | 25.6% |
| Kathua | 21.599 | 3.5% |

==== Historical population ====
Historical population
| Year | Pop. | ±% p.a. |
|---|---|---|
| 1941 | 283,741 | — |
| 1961 | 209,327 | −1.51% |
| 1971 | 695,375 | +12.76% |
| 1981 | 428,106 | −4.74% |
| 2001 | 747,850 | +2.83% |
| 2011 | 1,170,054 | +4.58% |
source: Indian census 1941 _ 1961 _ 1971 _ 1981 _ 2001 _ 2011

The Gujari speaking population in Jammu and Kashmir was 7,47,850 with an increase of +2.83% according to the 2001 Indian census.

The 2011 Indian census showed a +4.58% increase in the Gujari speaking population, reaching 1,170,054 in the Jammu and Kashmir region.

==== Maharashtra ====
In the 2011 Indian census, the Gujari-speaking population in Maharashtra state was recorded as 55,735.

==== Himachal Pradesh ====
In 1961 census in Himachal Pradesh Gujari speaking Gurjars were recorded as 4,927. In the 2011 Indian census, the Gujari-speaking population was recorded as 14,127, mostly spoken by Muslim Gujjars in the Chamba, Kangra and Solan districts.

==== Indian Punjab ====
In the 2011 Indian census, the Gujari-speaking population in Punjab, India was recorded as 7,024, spoken by Muslim Gujjars in the Hoshiarpur, Ludhiana, Amritsar and Pathankot districts.

==== Madhya Pradesh ====
In Madhya Pradesh's 1961 census Gujari speaking were recorded as 453. In the 2011 Indian census, the Gujari-speaking population in Madhya Pradesh was recorded as 5,977, spoken by Hindu Gurjars.

==== Uttarakhand ====
In the 2011 Indian census, the Gujari-speaking population In Uttarakhand was recorded as 3,822, mostly spoken by Muslim Gujjars in the Dehradun and Haridwar districts.

==== Gujarat ====
In the 2011 Indian census, the Gujari-speaking population in Gujarat was recorded as 3,496 spoken by Hindu Gurjars.

==== Uttar Pradesh ====
In 1961 Indian census in Uttar Pradesh Gujari speakers were recorded as 1,448. In the 2011 census in Uttar Pradesh Gujari-speaking, Gujars were recorded as 1,758.

==== Rajasthan ====
In the 2011 census of India, the Gujari-speaking population in Rajasthan was recorded as 308 spoken by Hindu Gurjars.

==== Haryana and Chhattisgarh ====
In the 2011 Indian census, the Gujari-speaking population in Haryana was recorded as 129. In Chhattisgarh state their population recorded as only 12 individuals in 2011 census of India.

=== Pakistan ===
==== Azad Kashmir ====
In Azad Kashmir Gujari speaking Gujjars are estimated to be around 8,00,000. Gujari speakers are found in all ten districts of Azad Kashmir, while non Gujari speaking Gujjars are not included. Muzaffarabad, Kotli, Jhelum (Hattian Bala) and Haveli are major districts where share of Gujari is spoken as mother tongue is 35-30%.

==== Population ====
Gujar speaking population share in districts of Azad Kashmir.

2020 census statistics
| Districts | Gujari % |
|---|---|
| Muzaffarabad | 35% |
| Kotli | 35% |
| Jehlum | 35% |
| Haveli | 30% |
| Mirpur | 10% |
| Neelum | 10% |
| Poonch | 6% |
| Bhimber | 5% |
| Bagh | 3% |
| Sudhanoti | 1 or 2% |

==== Khyber-Pakhtunkhwa ====
Gujari is a major language of Khyber Pakhtunkhwa after Pashto, Hindko, and Saraiki. It is spoken in the northern half of the KPK province. Gujari is mainly spoken in almost all major cities and cantonment areas of the province. There is no numbers for Gujari speakers is available in Khyber Pakhtunkhwa as Gujari is not included in any census reports for KPK. There are approximately 2,23,505 Gujari-speaking Gujjars in north western parts of Khyber Pakhtunkhwa. (Note: These numbers are based on the estimates for Chitral District (1969), Swat Kohistan (2025), Indus Kohistan (now divided into Upper Kohistan District, Lower Kohistan District & Kolai-Palas Kohistan District) (1,09,528, 2024), Lower Dir District (10,500), and for Battagram District (18%, 60,477).) As per estimation there were 2,910 in 1969 for Chitral District and as per 2025 estimates their population is 40,000 in Swat Kohistan. In Lower Dir District their population is 10,500.

Indus Kohistan is now divided in three districts: Lower Kohistan District, Upper Kohistan District and Kolai-Palas Kohistan District located in the Kohistan region of Khyber Pakhtunkhwa. In the 2023 census of Pakistan, the total population of these three districts was 10,43,126. Gujjars made up around 10.5% of the combined population of these three districts (in Indus Kohistan), with a population of 1,09,528. In Battagram District, Gujari speakers make UP 18% of the population, with 60,477 people. Although they are found throughout northern areas of Pakistan especially in Hazara region.

==== Gilgit-Baltistan ====
In Gilgit-Baltistan, there are six major languages are spoken by different ethnic groups, and Gujari is one of them.

=== Afghanistan ===
The population of Gujari (Gojri) speakers in Afghanistan is scattered in the eastern parts of Afghanistan and numbers at 18,580 (according to a 2015 estimate). However, other estimates from local tribesmen estimate upwards of 50,000.

== Writing System ==
Gujari can be written using both Nastaliq and Devanagari scripts. In India, Devanagari is more common in Indian states like Gujarat, Maharashtra, Himachal Pradesh, Uttar Pradesh, Madhya Pradesh, Punjab, Haryana, Rajasthan, and Uttarakhand, while Nastaliq is used in Kashmir. Over in Pakistan, usually Nastaliq script used by Gujjar people in Azad Kashmir, Gilgit-Baltistan, Hazara, and Khyber Pakhtunkhwa.

== Typological features ==
Gujari shares linguistic similarities with nearby Indo-Aryan languages like Urdu, Hindi, Marwari, Gujarati, Mewati, Punjabi, Pahadi, Haryanvi, and Hindko.

== Orthodoxy ==
Before Islam, it's unclear how Gujari was written down. Around 1900 AD, when Gujjar tribes migrated to the Himalayan valleys, they started to develop a more regular way of writing Gujari. Muslim, Hindu, and Sikh Gujjars played a role, using different scripts. Gojri mixes letters from Persian, Urdu, Devanagari, and Gurmukhi. The alphabet is like Urdu's, but it has its own distinct sounds.

== Phonology ==
The sounds in Gujari are much like other Indo-Aryan languages. There are constants, vowels, and special sounds like nassals, voiced and voiceless stops, and Retroflex consonants.

Consonants
| | | Labial | Dental/ Alveolar | Retroflex | Post-alv/ Palatal | Velar | Glottal |
|---|---|---|---|---|---|---|---|
| Plosive/ Affricate | voiceless | p | t | ʈ | t͡ɕ | k | |
| Plosive/ Affricate | aspirated | pʰ | tʰ | ʈʰ | t͡ɕʰ | kʰ | |
| Plosive/ Affricate | voiced | b | d | ɖ | d͡ʑ | ɡ | |
| Plosive/ Affricate | breathy | bʱ | dʱ | ɖʱ | d͡ʑʱ | ɡʱ | |
| Plosive/ Affricate | implosive | ɓ | ɗ | | | | |
| Fricative | | | s | | | | h |
| Nasal | | m | n | ɳ | | ŋ | |
| Flap | voiced | | ɾ | ɽ | | | |
| Flap | breathy | | ɾʱ | ɽʱ | | | |
| Lateral | voiced | | l | ɭ | | | |
| Lateral | breathy | | lʱ | ɭʱ | | | |
| Continuant | | | | | j | w | |

- Gujari exhibits a fossilised system of vowel harmony as other Indo-Aryan languages of the same areas including Dogri, Rajasthani, Punjabi, Pahadi, and Kangri.

Vowels
| | Front | Central | Back |
|---|---|---|---|
| Close | i | | u |
| Close | ɪ | | ʊ |
| Mid | e | ə | o |
| Mid | ɛ | ə | ɔ |
| Open | | ä | |

- Nasalization: Gujari language has vowel nasalization /~/.
- Tones: Gujari has a high tone/´/.

== Institutions and media ==
All India Radio and Doordarshan Kendra run various Gujari programmes. Radio Kashmir Jammu, Srinagar, Poonch in India and seven radio stations of Pakistan and PTV air Gujari programmes and news bulletins accepted across Jammu and Kashmir. Books have been published in Gujari, including encyclopedias, poetry, fiction and non-fiction, on topics including dictionaries, grammars, nature, folklore, art and architecture, agriculture, sociology and research.

The National Academy of Letters, Sahitya Akademi, recognized Gujari as one of the major Indian languages for its National Award, Bhasha Samman, and other programmes. The Jammu and Kashmir Academy of Arts, Culture and Languages established a Gujari Department in its Central Office in the 1970s and published in Gujari. They organized seminars, conferences, etc. for the development of the Gujari Language. Jammu and Kashmir State Board of School Education made curriculum in Gujari up to Middle Standard for teaching Gujari in schools. The University of Jammu Council approved the opening of Gojri Research Centre in Jammu University and University of Kashmir that have been awarded doctorate degrees on completing research projects on the language. In Azad Kashmir, Pakistan, the Gujari Academy has been established and postgraduate studies departments were set up in various universities and regional research centers.

In some areas of Afghanistan and Kunar Province local radio stations air programs in Gujari, Nuristani and other languages.

== Resemblance ==
Words comparison
| English | Sanskrit | Gujari | Urdu|Hindi | Punjabi | Kangri | Rajasthani |
|---|---|---|---|---|---|---|
| Work | Karma | Kamm | Kaam | Kamm | Kamm | Kaam |
| Ear | Karna | Kann | Kaan | Kann | Kann | Kaan |
| Forehead | Masta | Mattho | Maathaa | Mathha | Mattha | Matho |
| Hot | Tapta | Tatto | Taataa | Tatta | Tatta | TaatoZ |
| Sweet | misTha | miTTho | miiThaa | miTTha | miTTha | miiTo |
| Eye | aksi | akhhā | ākh | ãkkh | akkhã | ãkhy |
| Seven | Sapta | satt | saat | satt | satt | Saat |

Words comparison
| English | Gujari | Hindko | Pahari |
|---|---|---|---|
| Father | baːp | peː | peoː |
| Daughter | tiji | tiji | ti |
| Tree | buːʈoː | buːʈa | buːʈa |
| Mountain | paːɽ | ʈaka | ʈakiː / ʈaka |
| Tongue | dʑiːb | dʑiːb | dʑiːw |
| Twenty | biː | biːs | viː |

| Gujari | English | Urdu |
|---|---|---|
| Kam | Work | Kaam |
| Acho | Good | Acha |
| Kuj | Some | Kuch |
| Kalo | Black | Kala |
| Hor | More | Aur |
| Sunn | Listen | Sunn |

== Proverbs and traditional words ==
Gujari language has different proverbs in its various dialects. These proverbs vary in delivery and tone across different regions and dialects. Some proverbs in Maharashtrian Gujari are:

=== Proverbs ===
| Maharashtrian Gujari | English | Urdu | Hindi |
|---|---|---|---|
| 'Sangri na Bharse Dangri Mati' and 'Kutai Kutai Mari' | Company of a bad person is always full of unhappiness | بُرے انسان کی صحبت ہمیشہ بے سکونی سے بھری ہوتی ہے۔ | बुरे व्यक्ति का साथ हमेशा परेशानी ही देता है |
| 'Chandan Layi gadhan and 'Ukhallo purena loyan' | A person's original nature can never be changed | انسان کی اصل فطرت کبھی نہیں بدل سکتی۔ | इंसान का असली स्वभाव कभी नहीं बदलता |
| Chabharya manusan babrya oth ani bigar icharani sange got | A person who meddles between unasked | بلا پوچھے مداخلت کرنے والا شخص | बिना पूछे टांग अड़ाने वाला इंसान |

=== Traditional words ===
| Maharashtrian Gujari | English | Urdu | Hindi |
|---|---|---|---|
| Maanusnu dagadse bhi kaam padas' | A man may need anyone or anything like a stone, so we should behave well with all | انسان کو کبھی بھی کسی کی ضرورت پڑ سکتی ہے، پتھر جیسی چیز کی بھی، اس لیے ہمیں سب کے ساتھ اچھا سلوک کرنا چاہیے۔ | इंसान को कभी किसी की भी ज़रूरत पड़ सकती है, पत्थर जैसी चीज़ की भी, इसलिए हमें सबके साथ अच्छा व्यवहार करना चाहिए। |
| Bolnarana bora ikai jatas, pan na bolnarana Bansi Gahu bhi ikata nahi | A man must speak when it is necessary, otherwise he may lose | انسان کو جب ضروری ہو تب ہی بولنا چاہیے، ورنہ وہ نقصان اٹھا سکتا ہے۔ | इंसान को जब ज़रूरी हो तभी बोलना चाहिए, वरना वह नुकसान उठा सकता है। |
| Jawani ek laaj, and Awani be laaj | Any type of bad behavior to anyone is always bad | کسی کے ساتھ بھی کسی بھی قسم کا بُرا سلوک ہمیشہ بُرا ہی ہوتا ہے۔ | किसी के साथ भी किसी भी तरह का बुरा व्यवहार हमेशा गलत होता है। |

== Phrases ==
=== Colors ===
nīlo / neelo (نیلو) [blue]

Rto /Rato (رتو) [red]

پیلو Pīlo /Peelo [yellow]

Selo /Saayu (ساؤو /سیلو) [green]

گورو/توشو tosho / goro [purple]

کالو kalo [black]

چیٹو chīto /cheeto [white]

=== Sentences ===
1. Gujari: Ó is Ilākāko mālik tho.
  1. Translation: He was the owner of this area.
1. Gujari: Rasó sat te Haam charā gi.
  1. Translation: Throw the rope and we will climb [out]!

== Sample text ==
| Gujari (Romanized) | Ik aqal mand jaṇo tho. Wóh khāso hī gharīb tho. Qismat ko māreyo wóh mañdē hāl jaṇo qismat azmān wāstē apno shehar chhoṛ kē kisi dūja shehar mā chalē geyo. Jadd us nawāñ shehar kā lokān na usko hāl ahwāl pato laggo tē unhān nê us na kaheyo: Ay mhārā dostā! Tūñ ik kamm kar. Is shehar mā ik baṛo māl tē daulat āḷo bando hai. Wóh baṛo nēk tē khudā tars hai. Pūra shehar mā us ki sakhāwat ko mūch charcho hai. Aiso sakhi ke Hātim Tāī vī us var fakhar karē. Tūñ bila jhijhak te bē-khauf us ke koḷ chalo jā. Teri tang dasti us ki daryā dili nāl dūr ho jē gi." Us gharīb jaṇē nē jadd is amīr kī itnī ta'rīf sunī tē wóh baṛī ummīd te ās lai kē us ke koḷ chaleyo geyo. Par utt jā ke dekhè ke wóh daulat mand bando te baṛo ṭhāṭh bāṭh disan āḷo tē maghrūr jeyo bando hai. |
| Gujari (Nastaʿlīq) | اک عقل مند جنو تھو۔ وہ خاصو ہی غریب تھو۔ قسمت کو ماریو وہ مندے حال جنوں قسمت از مان واسطے اپنو شہر چھوڑ کے کسی دو جا شہر ما چلے گیو ۔ جد اس نواں شہر کا لوکاں نا اسکو حال احوال پتولگو تے اُنہاں نے اُس نا کہیو :اے مھارا دوستا! توں اک کم کر۔ اس شہر مالاک بڑو مال تے دولت آلو بندو ہے۔ وہ بڑونیک تے خدا ترس ہے۔ پورا شہر ما اُس کی سخاوت کو موچھ چرچو ہے۔ ایسوسخی کہ حاتم طائی وی اُس ور فخر کرے۔ توں بلا جھجھک تے بے خوف اُس کے کول چلو جا۔ تیری تنگ دستی اُس کی دریا دلی نال دور ہو جے گی اُس غریب جنا نے جد اس امیر کی اتنی تعریف سنی تے وہ بڑی امید تے آس لے کے اُس کے کول چلیو گیو۔ پر اُت جاکے کے دیکھے کہ وہ دولت مند بندو تے بڑو ٹھاٹھ باٹھ دسن آلو تے مغرور جیو بندو ہے۔ |
| Urdu (Nastaʿlīq) | ایک عقلمند انسان تھا- وہ بوہت ہی غریب تھا- قسمت کا مارا بورے ہال میں وہ قسمت ازمانے کلیئے اپنا شہر چورکے کسی دوسرے شہر چلا گیا ۔ جب نئے شہر کے لوگوں کو اسکا حال احوال پتا لگا تو انہونے اس سے کہا: "اے میرے دوست ایک کام کرو- اس شہر میں ایک بوہت مال و دولت والا آدمی ہے۔ وہ بوہت نیک اور خدا ترس آدمی ہے۔ پو رے شہر میں اسکی سخاوت کے بوہت چرچے ہیں- ایسا سخی کے حاتم طائی بھی اسپے فخر کرے ۔ تم بلا جھجھک بے خوف اس کے پاس چلے جاؤ۔ آپکی تنگدستی اسکی دریا دلی سے دور ہو گی-" اس غریب انسان نے اس امیر آدمی کی اتنی طریف سنی کے وہ بوہت امید اور آس لے کے اس کے پاس چلا گیا- پر اُدھر جاکے دیکھتا ہے کے وو دولت مند آدمی بوہت ٹھا ٹھہ بھاٹھ والا اور مغرور انسان ہے۔ |
| English translation | There was a wise man. He was very poor. Down on his luck, he left his own city and went to another city to try his fortune. When the people of the new city learned about his situation, they told him: "My friend, do this — there is very wealthy man in this city. He is a very kind and God-fearing man. His generosity is famous throughout the city. He is so generous that even Hatim Tai would be proud of him. Go to without any hesitation or fear your poverty will be revealed by his generosity." After hearing so much praise for that rich man, the poor man went to him full of hope and expectation. But when he got there, he saw that the wealthy man was very pompous, ostentatious, and arrogant. |
| Hindi (Devanagari) | एक बुद्धिमान इंसान था। वह बहुत ही गरीब था। किस्मत का मारा, बुरे हाल में वह अपनी किस्मत आजमाने के लिए अपना शहर छोड़कर किसी दूसरे शहर चला गया। जब नए शहर के लोगों को उसका हाल-अहवाल पता लगा तो उन्होंने उससे कहा: "ऐ मेरे दोस्त, एक काम करो— इस शहर में एक बहुत माल और दौलत वाला आदमी है। वह बहुत नेक और खुदा-तरस आदमी है। पूरे शहर में उसकी सखावत के बहुत चर्चे हैं। ऐसा सखी कि हातिम ताई भी उस पर फख्र करे। तुम बेझिझक, बेखौफ उसके पास चले जाओ। आपकी तंगदस्ती उसकी दरियादिली से दूर हो जाएगी।" उस गरीब इंसान ने उस अमीर आदमी की इतनी तारीफ सुनी कि वह बहुत उम्मीद और आस लेकर उसके पास चला गया। पर वहाँ जाकर देखता है कि वह दौलतमंद आदमी बहुत ठाठ-बाट वाला और मगरूर इंसान है। |

== Revival ==
In lower or plain areas of Pakistan, Gujjars have a major concentration in districts like Islamabad, Attock, Rawalpindi, Chakwal, Jhelum, Gujrat, Sialkot, Narowal, Gujranwala, Sargodha, Faisalabad, Sheikhupura, Lahore and Layyah. However, due to the revolution of time, the majority of them have forgotten or stopped speaking Gujrai. Gojri Bahali Programme (Gojri Revival Programme) has been launched in these areas to encourage Gujjars to restart speaking Gujari. Though this programme has a particular focus on these areas, it extends to the whole of Pakistan. Under this programme, Gujjars are being persuaded to readopt Gujari as their mother language. They are also being asked to mention it in the mother language column of various forms at educational institutions; when applying for computerised national identity card; and while filling out their particulars when seeking employment. Under this programme, the federal government will be asked to add Gujari in the mother language column of the population census. Similarly, the University of Gujrat will be asked to set up Gojri Department. The programme is the initiative of Muhammad Afsar Khan, a Kunduana Gujjar from Chak Dina village in Gujrat District. Kunduanas are a branch of Khatana Gujjars and trace their descent from Kandu, a famous Gujjar who lived during the reign of Mughal King Akbar or immediately before him in Gujrat district. His grave survives to date in Makiana village in Gujrat tehsil.

On 25 December 2022, a group of Gujjars in the Lower Dir District of Khyber Pakhtunkhwa requested Gujari be taught in schools. Sardar Shajehan Yousef gave the keynote speech at this event. It was organized by Tehreek Haquq-i-Gujjar Pakistan. Other figures, including Haji Zarin Khan, Bakht Zada Gujjar, and Imran Yousaf Gujjar, spoke at the meeting. Attendees came from Punjab and Azad Kashmir. The speakers shared stories of the Gujjars' bravery throughout history, including their fight against the British during the 1857 independence movement.

The Government of Azad Kashmir, the University of Azad Jammu and Kashmir, and the Allama Iqbal Open University have begun studies on how to protect and keep the Gujari language of Azad Kashmir alive.

== Bibliography ==
=== Dictionaries ===
- Gojri Dictionary (six volumes)
- Concise Gojri Dictionary
- Hindi- Gojri Dictionary
- Folk-Lore Dictionary (two volumes)
- Hindi- Gojri Dictionary
- Gojri English Dictionary

=== Books ===
- Gojri Lok Geet (2018)
- Gujjar Tribe of Jammu and Kashmir (2015)
- The Gujjars vol 1 to 6 (2013–16)
- Qadeem Gojri Lughat (2013)
- The Gujjar Tribe of J&K (2012)
- Gojri Grammer (2012)
- Tagore di Chunam Shairi (2011)
- Jammu Kashmir de Qabaila-te-uhna diya boliyaa (2010)
- Gujjar Tarekh (2009)
- Anjum Shanasi Biography (2007)
- Sajra Phull (Hakeem) (2007)
- Peehng (Mukhlis) (2007)
- Gujjar Shanakhat Ka Safar (in Urdu, 2005)
- Akhan Gojri Quotations (2004)
- Gojri Kahawat Kosh Gojri Quotations (2004)
- Gujjar ate Gojri (2004)
- Encyclopedia of Himalayan Gujjars (encyclopaedia in multiple volumes, 2000)
- Gojri Books
- Sajar Boot (book series)
- Gujari: Gwjry Syrt Alnby Ṣly Allh ʿlyh Wslm(lškār Mḥmd) Mṣnf Mfty Mḥmd Adrys Wly Hswāl Gwjr
- The Gujjars Tribe of Jammu and Kashmir
- Lok-Virso (1999)

=== Journals ===
- Sheeraza Gojri-Bi-Monthly
- Maharo Adab Gojri
- Shingran Ka Geet
- Gojri Ka Lal
- Qadawar
- Paneeri
- Gojri Look Geet
- Gojri Look Kahani
- Gujjar Aur Gojri
- Gojri Zaban-o-Adab

=== Further reading ===
- 2012: Javaid Rahi, The Gujjar Tribe of Jammu & Kashmir -Gulshan Books, Srinagar J&K 190001, 305 pp. ISBN 81-8339-103-6.
- Bashir, Syed Iram (2016). An ethnolinguistic study of gojri speakers of Jammu and Kashmir (PhD). University of Mysore. hdl:10603/147974.

== See also ==
- Gurjar Apabhraṃśa
- Old Western Rājasthāni
- Gujarati
- Rajasthani languages
- Gurjari (raga)
