= Chinthana =

Chinthana is a masculine given name. Notable people with the name include:

- Chinthana Dharmadasa (born 1976), Sri Lankan writer, film director, film producer, and screenwriter
- Chinthana Vidanage (born 1981), Sri Lankan weightlifter
