= Deolapar =

Village in Maharashtra

- village
- Location in Maharashtra, India Deolapar (India)
- Coordinates: 21°35′10″N 79°22′10″E
- Country: India
- State: Maharashtra
- District: Nagpur
- Elevation: 580 m (1,900 ft)

Languages
  - Official: Marathi
- Time zone: UTC+5:30 (IST)

Deolapar is a village in Nagpur district in Nagpur division of Vidarbha region of Maharashtra state in India.

Being on the border of two states, the town has the mixed culture among people, who are mainly from Marathi-speaking Maharashtra and Hindi-speaking Madhya Pradesh state.

== Education ==
A government school named Swami Vivekanand School provides education up to 12th(Art) standard. Recently, Science course has also been added in its curriculum to help people getting further education. People normally move to nearest city Nagpur for higher education or indulge themselves in family business mainly agriculture. There is a Go Vigyan Anusandhan Kendra just one km (0.62 mi) from Deolapar that is unique in its kind and deals with research and development on various aspects of living and science on life of cows.

== Tourism ==
Deolapar is surrounded by two well known tourists spots, namely Guptganga and Ram Tekdi. A guest house is also being built by government for the stay of tourists. It is located on Maharashtra – Madhya Pradesh border and on National Highway 44 running between Srinagar in Jammu and Kashmir and Kanyakumari, Tamil Nadu.
