= Jaipur Kathak Kendra =

Government teaching institution

Jaipur Kathak Kendra is a teaching institution of Kathak. It was established by Government of Rajasthan in 1978 in Jaipur to patronise and develop the Jaipur Gharana of Kathak. The major priority of the Kendra is to develop the research work, education and training and to provide the stage for trained students and to popularise kathak. The present Acharya is Dr. Rekha Thakar.

== See also ==
- Kathak Kendra
