= Toolihalan =

- Village
- Location in Jammu and Kashmir, India Toolihalan (India)
- Coordinates: 33.7°N 74.8°E
- Country: India
- Union Territory: Jammu and Kashmir
- District: Shopian

Languages
  - Official: Kashmiri, Urdu, Hindi, Dogri, English
  - Spoken: Pahari
- Time zone: UTC+5:30 (IST)
- PIN Code: 192303

Toolihalan is a small village in Shopian district in Jammu and Kashmir, India. Toolihalan is situated on the banks of Rambi Ara, 4.3 km (2.7 mi) away from Shopian. The village is bounded by Chowgam towards East, Devepora towards West, Day Gam village towards North, and Hirpora Wildlife Sanctuary towards South. It has decades-old road that connects it to the main town of Shopian.

== History ==
The history of Toolihalan begins with the increase of population. Before 1952, the place was without human beings. Everywhere, there was nothing but forests. In 1952, some people migrated from Shopian to different places in search of food and safe shelter and few of them got settled at Toolihalan. Later, Government of Jammu and Kashmir constructed a footway from Shopian to Toolihalan. In 2014, deadly flood damaged footway badly. In 2015, Government of Jammu and Kashmir made minor changes in the road connectivity. With the development of technologies, road connectivity is the same as it was in 2015.

In September 2018, State Government macadamized the road from district police line Shopian to neighbouring village Nagabal and once again they neglected the people of Toolihalan by leaving its road without macadam.

== Population ==
According to the 2011 census, Toolihalan village has a population of 123 out of which 63 are males. Toolihalan has a sex ratio of 53% males and 47% females and a literacy rate of 41%.

== Education ==
The Government Upper Primary school worked for seven years and there were only 7-12 pupils studying. Later, Directorate of School Education Kashmir defunct the school due to the lack of students. Most parents of the local pupils prefer to send their children to Private school instead of Government schools because of poor education provided by the Government schools that have been seen common in Jammu and Kashmir.

== Transport ==
The major roads connecting Toolihalan with neighbouring villages and its district are:

1. Toolihalan-Shopian Road
2. Toolihalan-Zawoora Road
3. Toolihalan-Devpora Road
4. Toolihalan-Aliyalpora Road

== Places of interest ==
Toolihalan village has only one place with picnic potential: The forestry Nursery which is the most famous nursery in Kashmir valley. Every year, tourists come here to visit this beautiful place. The nursery is currently developed and maintained by the forest department under CAMPA Scheme. This nursery was developed on the banks of Rambi ara nala but it got destroyed by the 2015 deadly flood. Now the Nursery has been shifted to the same village in the forest area.
