= 2020 Amshipora murders =

Indian military scandal

The 2020 Amshipora murders, or the Amshipora fake encounter, or the Shopian fake encounter, refers to the killing of three alleged Kashmiri laborers, one of whom alleged to be a minor, by an Indian military personnel of the Rashtriya Rifles in the village of Amshipora, in the district of Shopian, in Jammu and Kashmir, on 18 July 2020. The Indian Army has claimed that the three victims are foreign terrorists who had been killed in an encounter with security forces after they opened fire on a security team. Preliminary investigations by the Indian Army in a Court of Inquiry, as well as by the Jammu and Kashmir Police, alleged that an Army personnel, aided by civilian informants, had staged the encounter and killed three labourers who were working for daily wages in local orchards, allegedly to claim a cash bounty of ₹20 lakh (equivalent to ₹24 lakh or US$24,000 in 2023), which is granted by the Indian Army as a reward for killing terrorists. The Indian Army is currently conducting a court-martial proceeding against Army Captain Bhoopendra Singh of the Rashtriya Rifles, as well as an unnamed non-commissioned officer, while proceedings are ongoing against two civilian informants in local courts in Kashmir.

== Background ==
The state of Jammu and Kashmir has faced decades of cross-border terrorism and insurgency, leading to prolonged instability in the region. In this challenging environment, the Indian Army has played a vital role in protecting civilians, safeguarding national security, and preventing large-scale violence. Operating under extremely difficult circumstances, the Army consistently emphasizes strict rules of engagement, legal oversight, and accountability.

Laws such as the Armed Forces (Special Powers) Act (AFSPA) were introduced by the Government of India to support security forces in tackling armed militancy, not to shield wrongdoing. The Army maintains a zero-tolerance policy toward human rights violations and has taken action whenever credible evidence of misconduct has surfaced. Far from incentivizing unlawful actions, the Army’s operations are focused on neutralizing threats, minimizing collateral damage, and promoting peace and stability in the region.

== Incident ==
On 18 July 2020, several Indian news sources reported that three unnamed terrorists had been killed an encounter with security forces in Amshipora, in Shopian district in Jammu and Kashmir. Initial reports indicated that the alleged terrorist affiliations of the three persons had not been identified as yet. The Kashmir Police posted on Twitter that "So far 03 unidentified terrorists killed. Operation going on. Further details shall follow."

Following the incident, the Indian Army went on to provide details of the alleged encounter. Brigadier Ajay Kotach stated to press that they had received information of four to five foreign terrorists in the area, following which security personnel from the Rashtriya Rifles began establishing a cordon. Kotach stated further that the unit laying the cordon was fired on, and waited until daylight to constitute a search unit made up of members of the Indian Army and the Central Reserve Police Force. The search party found the three alleged terrorists within a house and shot them, resulted in the deaths of all three. Brigadier Kotach also stated that a cache of arms and ammunition had been found with the three persons killed in the encounter. Discussing the incident, Kotach stated to press that he hoped it would act as a deterrent and result in reduced recruitment to terrorist groups. He also claimed that large groups of persons had gathered at the site and thrown stones at security personnel. A Jammu and Kashmir Police official stated to press that three men had been found in a cowshed, where they were killed.

In August 2020, families of three persons killed spoke to media, stating that the three men in question were labourers who had been working in Shopian district, and were not in any way affiliated with any terrorist groups. They were identified as three cousins, Imtiyaz Ahmad (aged 20), Abrer Ahmad (aged 16, and a minor at the time of his death) and Mohammed Ibrar (aged 25), who had, according to family members, travelled to Shopian seeking work on 16 July 2020 in apple and walnut orchards. After they failed to contact their families from 17 July 2020 onwards, the families of all three lodged missing persons complaints at Peeri Police Post in Rajouri district, where the three victims and their families originally resided. The families originally believed that the three had been temporarily detained because of quarantine restrictions to prevent the spread of COVID-19, and had therefore been unable to contact their families, but were concerned after there was no contact with their families on Eid. They were later informed about the Amshipora encounter killings. Pictures had been circulated on social media after the encounter, identifying the alleged "terrorists" as the three cousins, and had indicated to the family that there might be a connection between their disappearance and the incident.

Local residents in Amshipora later stated to the Indian Express that the three travelled annually from Rajouri to work in apple orchards as seasonal labourers, and had been renting a room in the area. A family member confirmed that they and many others trekked annually from Rajouri to Shopian, seeking seasonal employment in apple and walnut orchards. Family members stated that 16 year old Abrer Ahmad was in Class 11 at a school in Rajouri and had been working during the vacation to earn money to pay for his enrolment in Class 12 in the upcoming academic year.

== Investigation ==
=== Investigation by the Jammu and Kashmir Police ===
Following reports by the families of three murder victims to Jammu and Kashmir Police, the Jammu and Kashmir Police began an inquiry into the incident. The families of all three stated to police that they had been carrying Aadhar cards for identification at the time of their death, but initial reports from Army officers stated that they had been unable to identify the three people killed in the encounter. Army officials further stated that the bodies of three victims had been buried in unmarked graves after they were taken 235 kilometres away, in Baramulla district, after alleged failures to identify them.

The families of the three murder victims then demanded that the bodies should be exhumed and DNA testing be used to identify them. The Jammu and Kashmir collected DNA samples on 14 August 2020, at a government hospital, in the presence of a District Magistrate. Inspector General of Police Vikay Kumar stated to media that the samples would be tested in central forensic laboratories for matches with the victims' families. The Army also released a statement, indicating that they had seen social media reports concerning the encounter and would be investigating the matter, in parallel. On 25 September 2020, a Jammu and Kashmir police official confirmed that DNA testing had shown that the three men murdered in Amshipora on 18 July 2020 were in fact, Imtiyaz Ahmad, Abrer Ahmad, and Mohammed Ibrar, and were not foreign terrorists as claimed in initial Army reports.

In October 2020, the Lieutenant-Governor of Kashmir assured the families of the three victims that they would receive justice.

On 28 December 2020, the Jammu and Kashmir Police filed a charge sheet in their investigation, in a Shopian court. They claimed that Army Captain Bhoopendra Singh of the 62 Rashtriya Rifles, along with two civilian informants, had intentionally planned and organised to murder the three victims, in a staged encounter, and had later concealed the identities of the victims, planted weapons on them, and then alleged that they were terrorists. They claimed that Singh used an alias, Major Basheer Khan, during the conspiracy. They further claimed that he had been assisted in this by two civilian informants. The charge sheet states that the motivation for the staging the encounter and planting evidence was to claim a cash bounty of bounty of ₹20 lakh (equivalent to ₹24 lakh or US$24,000 in 2023), which is granted by the Indian Army as a reward for killing militants. The chargesheet further alleges that Captain Singh conspired with two local informants to abduct the three victims from their lodgings, took them to the shed where the alleged encounter occurred, and murdered them in order to claim the bounty. The police have accordingly charged the officers and civilians involved with murder, abduction, destruction of evidence and providing false information, criminal conspiracy, and possession of prohibited weapons.

The investigation is still ongoing, but Kashmir police have stated that they have not been able to interview two senior officers involved in the incident, Major Kush and Major Amit Kumar Rai, both of whom have since been transferred.

=== Investigation and court-martial by the Indian Army ===
On 18 August 2020, an Army spokesperson stated that a "high level Court of Inquiry" had been constituted to investigate the incident, and that statements were being taken from civilian witnesses. In September 2020, the Court of Inquiry reviewed the DNA evidence and confirmed that the three murdered men were labourers from Rajouri, and allowed the exhumed bodies to be returned to their families for burial. A statement released by the Army indicated that they had found "prima facie" indications of violations of the law by personnel of the Rashtriya Rifles, and had instituted disciplinary proceedings. During the course of their inquiry, the Army detained three civilians who had provided statements to them regarding information that they had provided to the Army before the encounter. In October 2020, the Jammu and Kashmir police stated that a police officer attached to a counter-insurgency unit had been detained in connection with the investigation. On 15 October 2020, Major General Bali of the Indian Army said press that the Court of Inquiry had found definite violations by the Army officers concerned with the killings, stating, "We are clear that our code of conduct has been flouted."

In response to queries, the Indian Army stated in September 2020 that the Jammu and Kashmir Police were responsible for investigating allegations of the murdered men's links to terrorist groups. In response, a Jammu and Kashmir Police spokesperson stated that the encounter had been conducted on information provided by the Indian Army. A police spokesperson stated that the killings had been conducted on "...specific input by 62 Rashtriya Rifles about presence of terrorists in village Amshipora area of District Shopian..." The Hindu reported in October 2020 that the police investigation had not been able to establish any links to terrorist and militant organizations.

On 25 December 2020, the Indian Express reported the Army's Court of Inquiry had found that an unnamed officer in the Rashtriya Rifles had exceeded his authority under the Armed Forces (Special Powers) Act and had failed to follow guidelines established by the Supreme Court of India in the exercise of these powers, during the Amshipora killings. The Court of Inquiry forwarded their evidence to the Army and recommended that he be tried in a court-martial proceeding, and indicated that disciplinary proceedings had been initiated.

Following the filing of charges by the Jammu and Kashmir Police, the Indian Army announced that they would conducting a court-martial against Army Captain Bhoopendra Singh, as well as an unnamed non-commissioned officer who had not been mentioned in the charge-sheet. This prevents the Army officers from being tried in criminal courts in Kashmir. The Indian Army has denied that the incident was motivated by potential claims to cash rewards, or that such a reward system exists. Indian news magazine India Today has previously reported that financial incentives are awarded by the Jammu and Kashmir government for killed militants.

== Response ==
In August 2020, the investigation into the Amshipora killings was widely reported on social media and several political leaders made statements calling for an investigation. Iltija Mufti, the daughter of Peoples Democratic Party president Mehbooba Mufti stated that the inquiry should be extended to other recent encounter cases in which bodies had been buried in unknown graves. Communist Party of India (Marxist) leader M.Y. Tarigami called for a court-led investigation into the incident. On 18 August 2020, the Centre of Indian Trade Unions (CITU) filed a complaint about the encounter with the National Human Rights Commission, calling for an investigation.

Following the DNA identification and confirmation of their identities, former Jammu and Kashmir Chief Minister, Omar Abdullah, posted on Twitter that the bodies of three murdered men should be exhumed and returned to their families for proper burial. Former Jammu and Kashmir Chief Minister Farooq Abdullah called for compensation to the victims' families in a session in the Lok Sabha of the Indian Parliament.

In January 2021, Brigadier Katoch, who had announced details about the alleged encounter to the press that were later revealed to be false, was the recipient of the Yudh Seva Medal, a gallantry award from the Government of India.

The Court Martial has convicted Captain Bhoopendra Singh for the encounter, and ultimately awarded a life sentence for the crime.
