= Mantribugh Shopian =

Mantribugh Matribagh
- Village
- Location in Jammu and Kashmir, India
- Coordinates: 33.686°N 74.926°E
- Country: India
- State: Jammu and Kashmir
- District: Shopian

Government
  - Type: Democracy
  - Body: Government of Jammu and Kashmir

Area
  - Total: 1.263 km^{2} (0.488 sq mi)

Population (2011)
  - Total: 1,141
  - Density: 903.4/km^{2} (2,340/sq mi)
- Demonym: Manterbughek

Languages
  - Official: Kashmiri, Urdu, Hindi, Dogri, English
- Time zone: UTC+5:30 (IST)
- PIN Code: Disputed between 192303 and 192231
- Vehicle registration: JK22
- Sex ratio: 544 ♀ / 597 ♂
- Literacy: 71.63%
- Distance from Shopian: 10.5 kilometres (6.5 mi) via Hajipora Rd
- Distance from Srinagar: 50 kilometres (31 mi) via Nowgam - Pulwama Rd
- Website: shopian.nic.in

Mantribugh or Matri Bagh is a village panchayat located in Shopian district of Jammu and Kashmir. It is situated 12.5 km (7.8 mi) away from its main town Shopian, the district headquarters of Shopian district.

Currently, the village hosts more than five schools, including a government high school. The village is surrounded by lush green apple orchards. A sub-health centre (SHC) is also located in the village, which provides vaccination and medicines to the local populace.

== Population Statistics ==
According to the 2011 census, Mantribugh has a total population of 1,141 peoples. There are about 181 houses in Mantribugh village. In 2011, the literacy rate of Mantribugh village was 71.63% . Thus Matri Bagh village has higher literacy rate compared to 62.49% of Shupiyan district. In Mantribugh, Male literacy stands at 81.66% while female literacy rate was 61.34%.

Particulars	Total	Male	Female
Total No. of Houses	181	-	-
Population	1,141	597	544
Literacy	71.63%	81.66%	61.34%

Religion in Mantribugh village (2011)
Religion	Percent
Islam	100%
Other or not stated	0%

Languages of Mantribugh village (2011)
1. Kashmiri (100.0%)

== Economy ==
The local economy depends on agriculture. Majority of the population are apple fruit growers.

== See also ==
- Shopian
- Herman, Shopian
- Kaprin
