= Wachi =

- Sub Tehsil
- Location in Jammu and Kashmir, India Wachi (India)
- Coordinates: 33.8001°N 75.0353°E
- Country: India
- Union Territory: Jammu and Kashmir
- Tehsil: Zainapora
- District: Shopian
- Elevation: 1,594 m (5,230 ft)

Population (2011)
  - Total: 3,943

Languages
  - Official: Kashmiri, Urdu, Hindi, Dogri, English
- Time zone: UTC+5:30 (IST)
- Website: shopian.nic.in

Wachi is a sub tehsil in Shopian district of Jammu Kashmir, India. It is situated on the banks of river Rambi Ara. Wachi is located 4 km (2.5 mi) towards east of Aglar and 13 km (8.1 mi) from Anantnag.

== See also ==
- Zainapora
- Aglar
- Litter, Pulwama
- Pulwama
- Chitragam
- Bijbehara
- Anantnag
- Zainapora Sub District
