= Kaprin =

Kaprin Kapran
- Village
- Location in Jammu and Kashmir, India Kaprin (India)
- Coordinates: 33.6639669°N 74.8962252°E
- Country: India
- State: Jammu and Kashmir
- District: Shopian

Government
  - Type: Democracy
  - Body: Govt. of Jammu & Kashmir
- Elevation: 1,739 m (5,705 ft)

Languages
  - Official: Kashmiri, Hindi, Urdu, Dogri, English
- Time zone: UTC+5:30 (IST)
- PINCODE: 192231
- Vehicle registration: JK22
- Website: shopian.nic.in

Kaprin or Kapran is a village in the Shopian district of Jammu and Kashmir. The people of the village are very religious. Islam is the religion mostly followed. It has been a hub of education from many decades. The town is empowered with the modern day amenities like banking and other public establishments. People are associated with the business of Apple and other fruits. The area has produced many Engineers, doctors, Lawyers and people from all other walks of life.

== Geography ==
Kaprin is located 10 km (6.2 mi) towards South from District headquarters Shopian. 10 km from Kulgam and 62 km from State capital Srinagar at an Altitude of 1,739 m (5,705 ft) above sea level.

Kaprin Pin code is 192231 and postal head office is Kulgam .

Vehil (4 km), Shamshipora (5 km), Reshnagri (6 km), Amshipora (6 km), Ramnagri (5 km), Gagren (8 km) are the nearby Villages to Kaprin.

Anantnag, Srinagar, Rajauri, Poonch, Shopian district, Kulgam are the nearby Districts to Kaprin.

This place is in the border of the Shopian and Kulgam district.

Aharbal waterfall is a nearby major sightseeing destination.

== Notable people ==
- Amin Kamil - Padma Shri awardee in 2005 for Literature and Education
- Parvez Ahmad - Ex-Chairman & CEO Jammu and Kashmir Bank
