= Hirpora =

Hirpora Heerpur
- Village
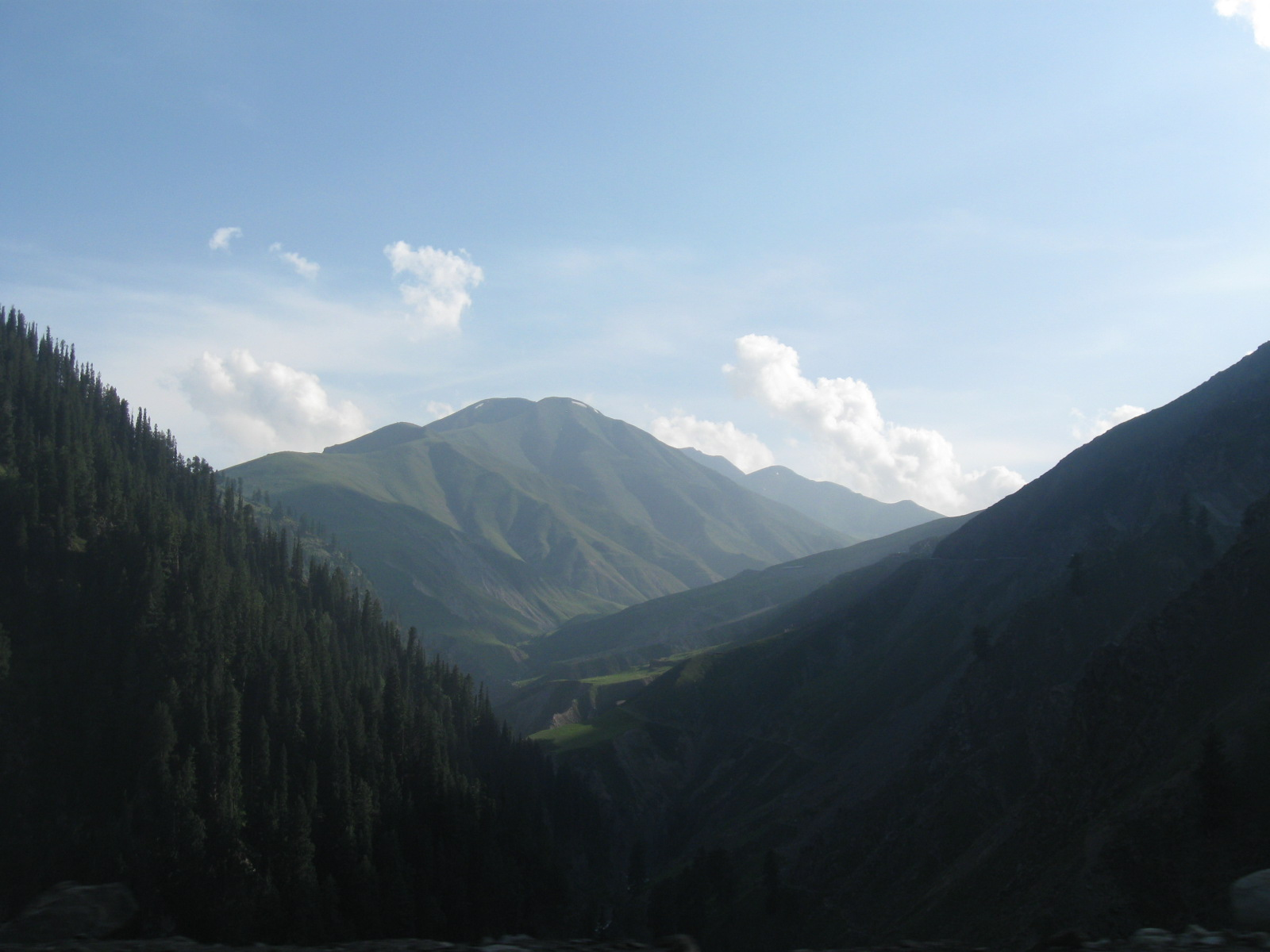
- Hirpora Wildlife Sanctuary in Hirpora, Shopian district, Jammu and Kashmir, India
- Nickname: Heerpora
- Location in Jammu and Kashmir, India Hirpora (India)
- Coordinates: 33.68°N 74.77°E
- Country: India
- State: Jammu and Kashmir
- District: Shopian

Area
  - Total: 8.9 km^{2} (3.4 sq mi)

Population (2011)
  - Total: 1,446 householders
  - Density: 160/km^{2} (420/sq mi)

Languages
  - Official: Kashmiri, Urdu, Hindi, Dogri, English
- Time zone: UTC+5:30 (IST)
- PIN Code: 192303
- Literacy: 48.84%
- Distance from Shopian town: 12 kilometres (7.5 mi)
- Distance from Srinagar city: 64 kilometres (40 mi)

Hirpora (or Heerpora) is a village, near Shopian town in the Shopian district in the Indian union territory of Jammu and Kashmir in the disputed Kashmir region. It is the second largest village in the district, after Devepora. It is situated on the Mughal Road, 12 km (7.5 mi) west of Shopian town, which is its district headquarters; and 64 km (40 mi) from Srinagar, the summer capital of Jammu and Kashmir, via the Srinagar-Pulwama Road. To the west of Hirpora is the Peer Ki Gali mountain pass over the Pir Panjal Range.

Most of Hirpora's area is occupied by thick forests. The Hirpora Wildlife Sanctuary was established between 1987 and 1989. The spiral-horned Markhor goat is a notable part of this wildlife.

== Population ==
According to a survey conducted by the 2011 Census of India, there are 1,446 householders in Hirpora village, comprising 8,540 individuals, of which 4,449 are males while 4,091 are females. There are an average 5 persons to a house.
