= Aglar Zainapora =

Aglar
- Town
- Aglar
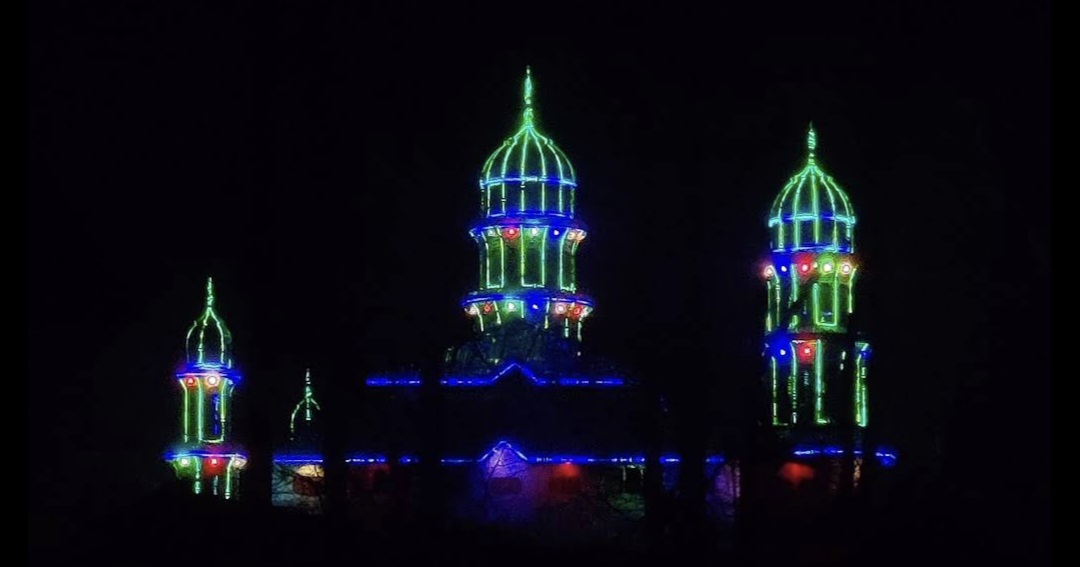
- Jamia Masjid Aglar

- Location in Jammu and Kashmir Aglar (India)
- Coordinates: 33.8153°N 75.0012°E
- Country: India
- Union Territory: Jammu and Kashmir
- Tehsil: Zainapora
- District: Shopian

Area
  - Total: 3.81 km^{2} (1.47 sq mi)
  - Rank: 13rd
- Elevation: 1,588 m (5,210 ft)

Population (Census 2011)
  - Total: 5,886 est.
  - Rank: 16th
  - Density: 1,540/km^{2} (4,000/sq mi)
  - Literacy: 64.65%

Languages
  - Official: Kashmiri, Urdu, Hindi, Dogri, English
- Time zone: UTC+5:30 (IST)
- PIN: 192305
- Telephone code: 01933
- Vehicle registration: JK22
- Sex ratio: 1014 ♀/♂
- Distance from Anantnag: 18 kilometres (11 mi)
- Distance from Srinagar via Pulwama: 40 kilometres (25 mi)

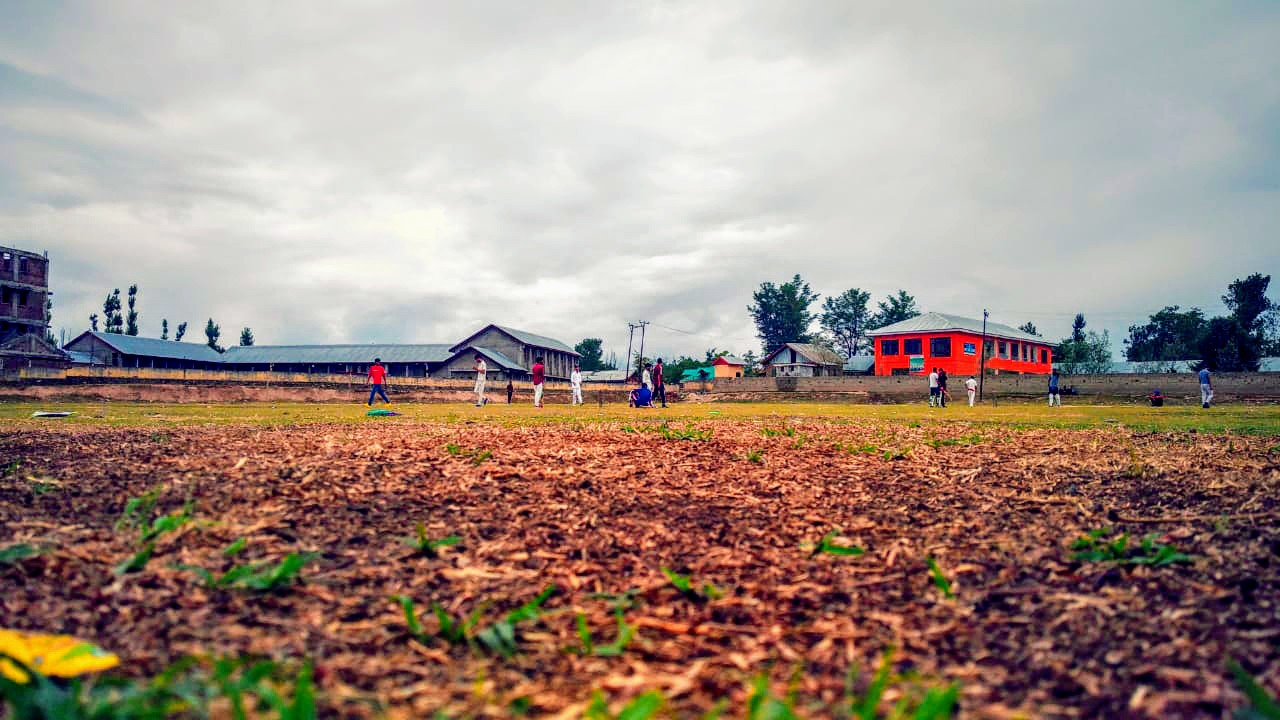
Sports Stadium Darpeth Aglar

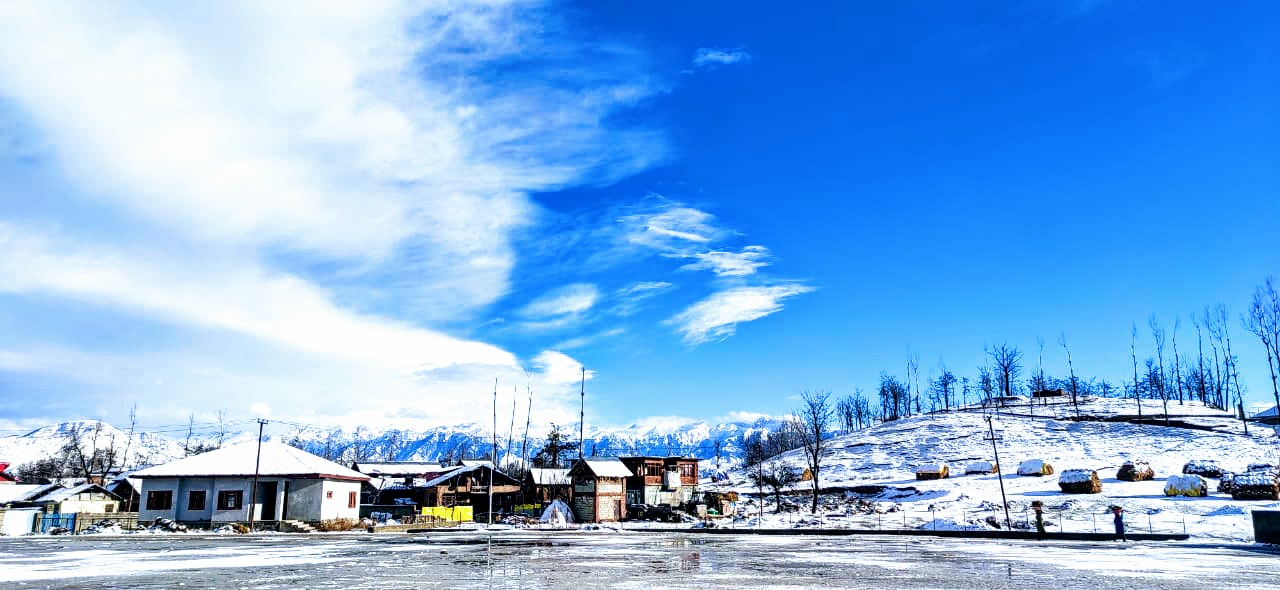
Darpeth Aglar

Aglar is a notified area and a town in Zainapora Sub District of Kashmir. It is situated on the left bank of Rambi Ara which demarcates between Pulwama district with Shopian district. Aglar is located 13 km (8.1 mi) towards east from Pulwama, 4 km (2.5 mi) from Zainapora and 18 km (11 mi) towards west from Anantnag. Aglar is 3rd most populous town, located in Zainapora sub district of the state Jammu & Kashmir in India and 3rd biggest town by area in the sub district. The Pin code of Aglar is 192305.

By population, Aglar is one of largest town located in Zainapora Sub District of Shopian district, Jammu and Kashmir with total 522 families residing. The Aglar town has population of 2,864 and the population density of the village is 752 persons per km^{2} as per 2011 population census. As per constitution of India and Panchyati Raaj Act, Aglar is administrated by Sarpanch who is an elected representative of village.

The district magistrate of Shopian district has approved the construction of public park, of which phase first was completed at an estimated cost of 2.5 lakh in Darpeth area of Aglar. The park has been thrown open for public in year 2023.

== Transport ==
Aglar is well connected by road to other towns in South Kashmir, such as Pulwama, Anantnag, and Shopian. There is a taxi stand named Budshah Sumo Stand Aglar that connects Aglar to almost every district and town of South Kashmir. The nearest railway stations to Aglar are Bijbehara railway station 8 km (5.0 mi) from Aglar and Panzgam railway station 12 km (7.5 mi). Nearest airport to Aglar is Sheikh ul-Alam International Airport which is located at a distance of 50 km (31 mi) from Aglar.

== Education ==
=== Schools in Aglar ===
- Jawahar Navodaya Vidyalaya Shopian (JNV Aglar).
- Government Model High School Aglar
- Al-Fallah English Medium School Aglar
- Government Primary School Nikloora
- S M International School Aglar

== Economy ==
Aglar is situated in a valley surrounded by lush greenery and mountains, which enhances its agricultural potential. The local economy largely relies on farming, with apple, walnut and rice cultivation being particularly significant.

== Healthcare ==
There is a Sub health centre functioning in the area providing basic health care facilities to the people. Other nearest hospitals to Aglar are:

- Government sub district hospital Zainapora (4 km from Aglar).
- Government Primary health centre Litter (1.5 km from Aglar).
- Government Medical College associated hospital Anantnag (18 km from Aglar)
- Government district hospital Pulwama (13 km from Aglar)

== See also ==
- Darpeth
- Nikloora
- Zainapora
- Litter
- Wachi
- Chitragam
- Pulwama
- Anantnag
- Bijbehara
- Awantipora
