= Chitragam =

- Tehsil
- Nickname: Chitra Gam
- Location in Jammu and Kashmir, India
- Coordinates: 33.77°N 74.9°E
- Country: India
- State: Kashmir
- District: Shopian

Area
  - Total: 5 km^{2} (1.9 sq mi)
  - Rank: 7th

Population (2011)
  - Total: 436 householders
  - Density: 87/km^{2} (230/sq mi)

Languages
  - Official: Kashmiri, Urdu, Hindi, Dogri, English
- Time zone: UTC+5:30 (IST)
- PIN Code: 192303
- Literacy: 63.73%
- Distance from Shopian: 13.4 kilometres (8.3 mi)
- Distance from Srinagar via NH1: 67.4 kilometres (41.9 mi)

Chitra Gam is a tehsil and a town in Shopian district of Jammu and Kashmir. It was upgraded to Tehsil under the administration of Shopian district. It is situated 13 km (8.1 mi) away from Shopian, where its district administrative units and district headquarters are located, and at a distance of 67.4 km (41.9 mi), the state summer capital Srinagar is situated via Srinagar-Pulwama road. This village is bounded by Molo, Maladair, Sugoo, and Handhama villages. It 8.9 km (5.5 mi) away from Achan Rambi Ara Bridge.

== Demographics ==
As per the report of 2011 Census of India, Chitragam is home of 436 householders which extends to 2,634 individuals, of which 1,320 are male and 1,314 are female.

== See also ==
- Zainapora
- Aglar
- Litter
- Pulwama
- Bijbehara
- Anantnag
- Shopian
