= Goti Pora =

Village in Shopian, India

- Village
- Location in Jammu and Kashmir, India
- Coordinates: 33.7°N 74.9°E
- Country: India
- State: Jammu and Kashmir
- District: Shopian

Population (2011)
  - Total: 2,204

Languages
  - Official: Kashmiri, Urdu, Hindi, Dogri, English
- Time zone: UTC+5:30 (IST)

Goti Pora is a village in Shopian tehsil of Shupiyan district in Jammu and Kashmir. Agriculture is the main occupation of Goti Pora village. Apple growing is the main source of livelihood of majority of households.
