= Panzer (disambiguation) =

A Panzer is an armored fighting vehicle, most often German tanks in World War II.

Panzer may also refer to:

== Gaming ==
- Panzer Digest, a wargaming periodical
- Panzer (video game), a 1977 edition of Panther
- Panzer (wargame), a 1979 board wargame

== Music ==
- Panzer (Chilean band), a heavy metal band
- Panzer AG, a Norwegian rock band

== Other uses ==
- Panzer (surname)
- Panzer, Shopian, a village in India
- Erik Hagen or Panzer (born 1975), Norwegian soccer player
