= Muhammad Abbas =

Muhammad Abbas, Mohammad Abbas or Mohammed Abbas may refer to:

- Mohammad Abbas (cricketer) (born 1990), Pakistani cricketer
- Mohammad Abbas Abbasi (governor) (1924–1988), Punjab governor
- Mohammad Abbas Akhund (born 1963), Afghan Taliban politician
- Mohammad Abbas Ansari (1936–2022), Kashmiri cleric
- Mohammad Abbas Bhat (died 2018), militant commander of the Hizbul Mujahideen in Shopian district, Jammu and Kashmir, India
- Muhammad Abbas Sheikh (died 2021), militant from the Hizbul Mujahideen and The Resistance Front
- Mohammed Abbas (Emirati footballer) (born 2002)
- Mohammed Abbas (football coach), Egyptian football manager
- Mohammed Abbas (rugby league), Australian-born rugby league player who represented Lebanon
- Mohammed Abbas (squash player) (born 1980), Egyptian squash player
- Mohammed Abbas (swimmer) (born 1978), Iraqi swimmer
- Muhammad I Abu 'l-Abbas (c. 788–c. 856), fifth emir of the Aghlabids in Ifriqiya
- Muhammad Abbas (New Zealand cricketer) (born 2003), New Zealand cricketer
- Muhammad Abbas (Emir of Kano) (died 1919), Nigerian traditional ruler
- Muhammad Abbas (skier) (born 1986), Pakistani alpine skier
- Muhammad Abbas Jafri, Pakistani politician
- Muhammad Abbas Khan, fictional character in the 2025 Indian film Haq, portrayed by Emraan Hashmi

== See also ==
- Mahmoud Abbas (disambiguation)
