= Panzer, Shopian =

- Village
- Location in Jammu and Kashmir, India
- Coordinates: 33.78°N 74.83°E
- Country: India
- State: Jammu and Kashmir
- District: Shopian

Population (2011)
  - Total: 96 householders

Languages
  - Official: Kashmiri, Hindi, Urdu, Dogri, English
- Time zone: UTC+5:30 (IST)
- PIN Code: 192303
- Literacy: 67.79%
- Distance from Shopian: 9.6 kilometres (6.0 mi)
- Distance from Srinagar: 51 kilometres (32 mi)

Panzer is the 63rd least populous village, in Shopian district, Jammu and Kashmir, India. Its administrative headquarters and units are in Shopian town. Panzer village is bounded by 4 villages, Tukroo towards Pulwama-Srinagar road, Wanpora towards Keller-Shadimarg Road, Watho towards East, and Diaroo towards West.

== Demographics ==
Panzer village is the home of 96 householders and the total population of the village is 494, of which 254 are males and 240 are females. Since it is in South Kashmir, the road connectivity of Panzer and its neighbouring villages are poor.
