= Tukroo =

- Village
- Location in Jammu and Kashmir, India
- Coordinates: 33.78°N 74.85°E
- Country: India
- State: Jammu and Kashmir
- District: Shopian

Population (2011)
  - Total: 134 householders

Languages
  - Official: Kashmiri, Urdu, Hindi, Dogri, English
- Time zone: UTC+5:30 (IST)
- PIN Code: 192303
- Literacy: 65.25%
- Distance from Shopian: 10 kilometres (6.2 mi)
- Distance from Srinagar: 44.5 kilometres (27.7 mi)

Tukroo is a village, situated between Keegam and Shopian which is 12 km (7.5 mi) away from Pulwama district, 10 km (6.2 mi) from Shopian district, and 44.5 km (27.7 mi) from state summer capital Srinagar. Its district headquarters are located in Shopian district in Indian administered state of Jammu and Kashmir. This village is 11 km (6.8 mi) away from Mughal Road which intersects the mountains of Pir Panjal Range.

== Demographics ==
According to a survey conducted by 2011 Census of India, there are 134 householders residing in Tukroo village which further diversifies into the total population of 829, of which 409 are males and 420 are females. The total area of this village is 76.9 hectares which is the 78th smallest village by area in Shopian.
