= Jamia Masjid, Shopian =

Mosque in Shopian, Jammu and Kashmir, India

Jamia Masjid
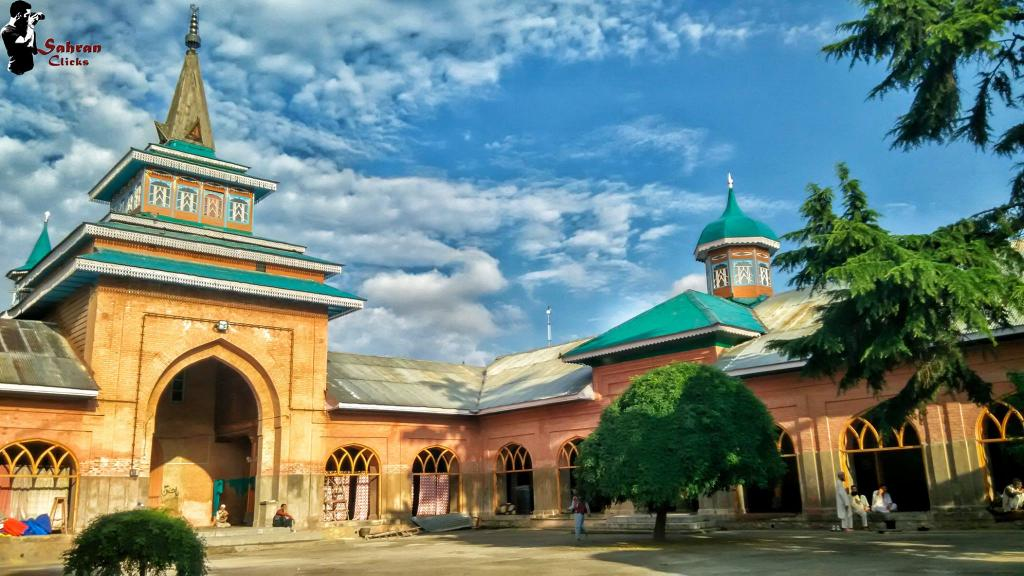
- A view of eastern entrance

- Location of the mosque in Jammu & Kashmir

Religion
- Affiliation: Islam
- Ecclesiastical or organizational status: Mosque
- Status: Active

Location
- Location: Tak Mohalla, Shopian, Jammu & Kashmir
- Country: India
- Interactive map of Jamia Masjid
- Coordinates: 34°05′54″N 74°48′33″E

Architecture
- Type: Mosque architecture
- Style: Mughal
- Completed: Mughal Era (first structure); 1953 CE (rebuild)
- Materials: Deodar, stones, bricks

The Jama Masjid is an historic Friday mosque, located in Shopian, in the union territory of Jammu and Kashmir, India in the disputed Kashmir region. The mosque was built during the Mughal period and is very beautiful from both inside and outside. It's considered one of the best mosques in the Shopian district.

== History ==
The Jamia Masjid Shopian was an important stop along the Mughal road through Pir Panjal, where the Mughals used to rest during their journeys. The mosque was commissioned by the Mughal Emperor Aurangzeb, making it a significant historical site of the period.

Local historical accounts also associate the mosque’s construction with contributions from the Banday family of Shopian, particularly Ab Rehman Banday and his relatives, who are said to have supported the building process. However, these claims require stronger independent sources to be fully verified under Wikipedia’s sourcing guidelines.

== Architecture ==
The Jamia Masjid is an historic mosque with a notable architectural heritage. Although the specific architectural details of the mosque are not outlined in the data provided, it is mentioned that the mosque was built during the Mughal period and later reconstructed in the 1940s. Mughal architecture has been noted for its designs, domes, and minarets, which could be features of this mosque as well.

The mosque's construction was supervised by Ustab Habib Ullah Mast, a carpenter from Srinagar, and it was built using local stones. The foundation stone of the modern Jamia Masjid at Shopian was laid in 1944, and the construction was completed over a few years. It's also mentioned that the mosque underwent renovation, indicating that efforts have been made to preserve its historical and architectural value.

== See also ==
- Islam in India
- List of mosques in India
