= Shahoora =

- Tehsil
- Location in Jammu and Kashmir, India
- Coordinates: 33.8153°N 75.0012°E
- Country: India
- Union Territory: Jammu and Kashmir
- District: Pulwama
- Elevation: 1,588 m (5,210 ft)

Languages
  - Official: Kashmiri, Urdu, Hindi, Dogri, English
- Time zone: UTC+5:30 (IST)
- PIN: 192305
- Telephone code: 01933
- Vehicle registration: JK13
- Website: pulwama.gov.in

Shahoora is a newly formed tehsil in Pulwama district of Jammu and Kashmir. The tehsil headquarters of Shahoora tehsil is located in Litter town.

Shahoora tehsil comprises about 40 villages, including IGC Lassipora, Chakoora, Pulwama and Wasoora, Pulwama
