= Parvez Ahmad =

Indian politician

Parvez Ahmad Nengroo
- پرویز احمد
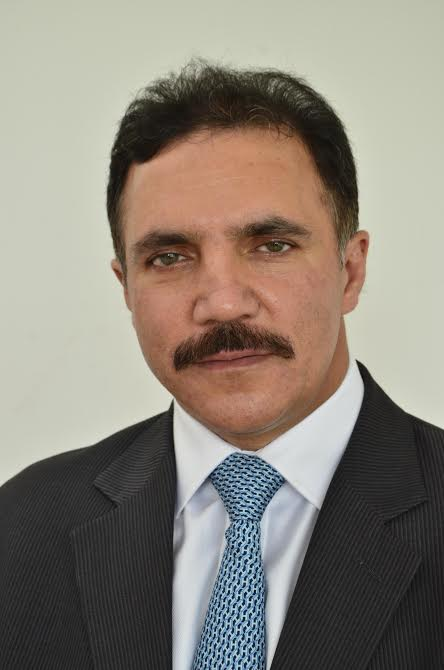

Chairman & CEO of Jammu and Kashmir Bank
- In office 6 October 2016 – 8 June 2019
- Governor: Satya Pal Malik
- Preceded by: Mushtaq Ahmad
- Succeeded by: Rajesh Kumar Chhibber

Personal details
- Born: 15 March 1964 (age 62) Kaprin, Shopian district, Jammu and Kashmir
- Party: Jammu and Kashmir People's Conference

Parvez Ahmad Nengroo is a Kashmiri politician who was born in 1964 at Kaprin, a village in South Kashmir's Shopian district. Parvez Ahmad was chairman and CEO of Jammu and Kashmir Bank. He was removed by the state government on the charges of "mis-governance". He is the second chairman and CEO of J&K Bank, after Haseeb A Drabu, to be suddenly removed by the J&K state government. On 23 September 2021, Nengroo joined the Jammu and Kashmir People's Conference

== Early life ==
He was born in 1964 at Kaprin, a village in South Kashmir. He became Executive President of J&K Bank and the first in-service and second in-house Chairman and CEO of Jammu and Kashmir Bank. He is a qualified Company Secretary and a member of the Institute Of Company Secretaries of India (ICSI). Prior to be appointed as a Company Secretary of J&K Bank in the year 1998, he had worked for various corporate houses in India

== Career ==
Parvez Ahmad joined Jammu and Kashmir Bank as the first Company Secretary in 1998 during its maiden public issue. He held various senior important positions in the bank as a part of Corporate Management team. He joined J&K bank as a scale III officer in the year 1998 and served in the J&K Bank for nearly two decades. He was the senior Executive President before rising to the rank of chairman and CEO. He was removed as chairman and also as a director (government nominee) of J&K Bank On 8 June 2019 by government of J&K state when the state was under presidential/Governor rule. As there is no direct provision for removal of Chairman under Companies Act, 2013/ Banking Regulation Act, 1949, he was removed as a government nominee director consequent upon which he ceased to be the Chairman of J&K bank. The way in which the removal was done was condemned by the J&K Bank Officers Association in their press release dated 17 June 2019 published in the Greater Kashmir (Local English Newspaper). The J&K Bank Officers Association and Traders' federations, though, supported the attempts by the state government to improve the transparency, accountability, fair recruitment policy and governance in J&K Bank. The anti-corruption bureau of J&K registered an FIR and made several raids including the ones at the corporate office of J&K Bank at Srinagar and at the residence of the ousted Chairman Parvez Ahmed. But, No arrests have been made and the results of the investigations of various appointments made, loans disbursed and One Time Settlements done during Parvez Ahmed's Tenure in J&K Bank and also during prior period are yet to be made public.

Parvez Ahmad served as a Director on the Board of JKB Financial Services Limited.

Parvez Ahmad, BSc, ACS, is a Member of the Institute of Company Secretaries of India (ICSI).
