= Zainapora =

- Town
- Zainapora
- Location in Jammu and Kashmir, India
- Coordinates: 33.7763°N 75.0055°E
- Country: India
- union territory: Jammu and Kashmir
- District: Shopian
- Elevation: 1,594 m (5,230 ft)

Languages
  - Official: Kashmiri, Urdu, Hindi, Dogri, English
- Time zone: UTC+5:30 (IST)
- PIN: 192124
- Telephone code: 01933
- Vehicle registration: JK22
- Website: https://shopian.nic.in

Zainapora is a village in Shopian district in the Indian union territory of Jammu and Kashmir. It is also known as land of springs because of its countless springs. Zainapora is located 19 km (12 mi) from district headquarter Shopian, 4 km (2.5 mi) from Aglar, 17 km from Pulwama, and 63 km (39 mi) from the capital Srinagar.

The village has a horticulture department which has second largest orchards under cultivation in Asia.

== History ==
The village got its name from the great medieval period king Zain-ul-Abidin, who used to visit a Sufi saint living in the town.

== Demographics ==
The Village had a population of 1739 as per the data released by 2011 Census of India. The average sex ratio of Zainapora is 961.

Zainapora has a higher literacy rate compared to Jammu and Kashmir. As per 2011 census, the literacy rate of Zainapora was 70.01%.

== Education ==
- Government Higher Secondary School Zainapora
- Government Degree College Zainapora
- NIPS zainapora
- Government High School Aglar
- Jawahar Navodaya Vidyalaya Shopian (JNV Aglar)
- Al Fallah English Medium School Aglar

== Transport ==
Zainapora is connected with Shopian, Pulwama via Aglar, Kulgam and Anantnag. The nearest railway station to Zainapora is Bijbehara railway station.

== Healthcare ==
Zainapora has a Sub-district hospital and several other government health care centres in adjoining areas of the sub district.

== See also ==
- Aglar
- Litter
- Wachi
- Chitragam
- Anantnag
- Bijbehara
- Pulwama
- Awantipora
- Srinagar
- Shopian
