= Mohammad Abbas Bhat =

Hizbul Mujahideen commander (died 2018)

- Born: Cheki Mantribugh Shopian
- Died: 25 November 2018 Batagund Shopian
- Buried: Cheki Mantribugh Shopian
- Allegiance: Hizbul Mujahideen
- Activity years: 2016–2018
- Rank: Commander
- Conflicts: Kashmir conflict *Insurgency in Jammu and Kashmir

Mohammad Abbas Bhat (aka Ali bhai) was the district commander Shopian of the Hizbul Mujahideen.

== Death ==
Bhat was killed in a firefight with Indian military forces in Batagund area of Shopian district. He was subsequently buried in Mantribugh. His death sparked clashes in the region.
