= Wasoora, Pulwama =

Wasoora Pulwama Wasoor
- Village
- Location in Jammu and Kashmir, India
- Coordinates: 33.8346°N 74.9808°E
- Country: India
- Union Territory: Jammu and Kashmir
- District: Pulwama
- Tehsil/Block: Litter Pulwama
- Elevation: 1,588 m (5,210 ft)

Population (2011)
  - Total: 1,956
- Time zone: UTC+5:30 (Indian Standard Time)
- Postal code: 192305
- Area code: 01933
- Vehicle registration: JK13

Wasoora Pulwama, also known as Wasoor, is a village in Shahoora Tehsil of Pulwama district of Jammu and Kashmir in India. It is located 14 km (8.7 mi) towards East from District headquarters Pulwama and 50 km from State capital Srinagar.

The village is served by a government higher secondary school, a private middle school, and several primary schools. Healthcare services are provided through a Primary Health Centre (PHC). Banking facilities include a branch of Jammu & Kashmir Bank with an ATM.

== See also ==
- Chakoora Pulwama
- Tahab Pulwama
