= District Hospital Pulwama =

Geography
- Location: Pulwama, Jammu and Kashmir, India

Organisation
- Type: District Hospital
- Affiliated university: Directorate Health Services Kashmir (DHS KASHMIR)

Services
- Emergency department: Emergency Services 24×7 Available
- Beds: 200-500

History
- Constructed: 1959
- Opened: 1959

Links
- Lists: Hospitals in India

District Hospital Pulwama is one of the oldest hospitals in Jammu and Kashmir, established in 1959. It is located along the Srinagar–Nowgam highway. The hospital serves as the primary critical care facility for both Pulwama and Shopian districts. As of recent years, it also hosts five postgraduate (PG) departments.
