= Keller, Shopian =

Keller
- Village
- Country: India
- State: Jammu and Kashmir
- District: Shopian

Population (Census 2011)
  - Total: 10,370 families

Languages
  - Official: Kashmiri, Urdu, Hindi, Dogri, English
  - Spoken: Gujari
- Time zone: UTC+5:30 (IST)
- PIN Code: 192303

Keller is a village located in Shopian district of the Indian union territory of Jammu and Kashmir. District headquarters are located in Shopian.

== Geography ==
It is 12.5 km (7.8 mi) away from Shopian and 47 km (29 mi) from State summer capital Srinagar. Keller Block consists of several villages. It is bounded by Kulgam, Devsar and Qaimoh Blocks on the East and Pulwama Block to the North.

== Population ==
According to India Census 2011, Keller village (Block), including its adjoining areas, has 10,370 families comprising 59,219 individuals. 30,351 are males and 28,868 are females.

== Community health center ==
The Department of Health Services Jammu and Kashmir and the Government of Jammu and Kashmir constructed a sub-district hospital.

== Education ==
In Keller, several Primary schools provide primary education. Keller block is one of the largest in Jammu and Kashmir without higher education institutions.
