= Tahab, Pulwama =

Tahab Pulwama
- Town
- Tahab Pulwama
- Location in Jammu and Kashmir, india
- Coordinates: 33.5021°N 74.5552°E
- Country: India
- Union Territory: Jammu and Kashmir
- District: Pulwama
- Block/Tehsil: Pulwama
- Elevation: 1,588 m (5,210 ft)

Population (2011)
  - Total: 4,655
- Time zone: UTC+5:30 (IST)
- Area code: 01933

Tahab is a notified area and town in Pulwama district of Jammu and Kashmir in India and is governed by Tahab Gram Panchayat. It is located 6.4 km (4.0 mi) east of district headquarters Pulwama and 41.5 km (25.8 mi) from the state capital Srinagar.

== See also ==
- Chakoora Pulwama
- Wasoora Pulwama
