= Manzimpara =

Village in Shopian, Jammu and Kashmir

Manzimpara or Manzim Pora is a village in the Shopian district of Jammu and Kashmir union territory in India. The village is 6 km away from Shopian on Kadder Road. The population of the village is nearly 1000.
