= Zainapora tehsil =

Zainapora زٲنہٕ پوٗر
- Sub district
- Zainapora
- Location in Jammu and Kashmir, India
- Coordinates: 33.7763°N 75.0055°E
- Country: India
- Union Territory: Jammu and Kashmir
- District: Shopian
- Elevation: 1,594 m (5,230 ft)

Languages
  - Official language: Urdu and English
  - Spoken Language: Kashmiri
- Time zone: UTC+5:30 (IST)
- PIN: 192303
- Telephone code: 01933
- Vehicle registration: JK22
- Website: shopian.nic.in

Zainapora is a sub district in the Shopian district of Jammu and Kashmir, India. It is one of three sub districts of Shopian district. The sub district headquarter is located in Zainapora town. Zainapora is located 19 km (12 mi) towards north-east of district Anantnag.

== Education ==
- Jawahar Navodaya Vidyalaya Shopian (JNV Aglar)
- Government Higher Secondary School Zainapora
- Government Degree College Zainapora
- NIPS Zainapora
- Government High School Aglar
- Al Fallah English Medium School Aglar
- Allama Iqbal Memorial Institute Zainapora
- Government Middle School Safanagri
