= Lassipora =

Lassipora Lassipur
- Sub Tehsil
- Location in Jammu and Kashmir Lassipora (India)
- Coordinates: 33.8134°N 74.9408°E
- Country: India
- Union Territory: Jammu and Kashmir
- Tehsil: Shahoora
- District: Pulwama

Languages
  - Official: Kashmiri, Urdu, Hindi, Dogri, English
- Time zone: UTC+5:30 (IST)
- PIN: 192301

Lassipora, also known as Lassipur, is a sub tehsil in Pulwama district of Jammu Kashmir, India. It is located 8 km towards southeast of Pulwama and 19 km towards west of Anantnag.
