= Darpeth =

- Locality
- Darpeth Aglar
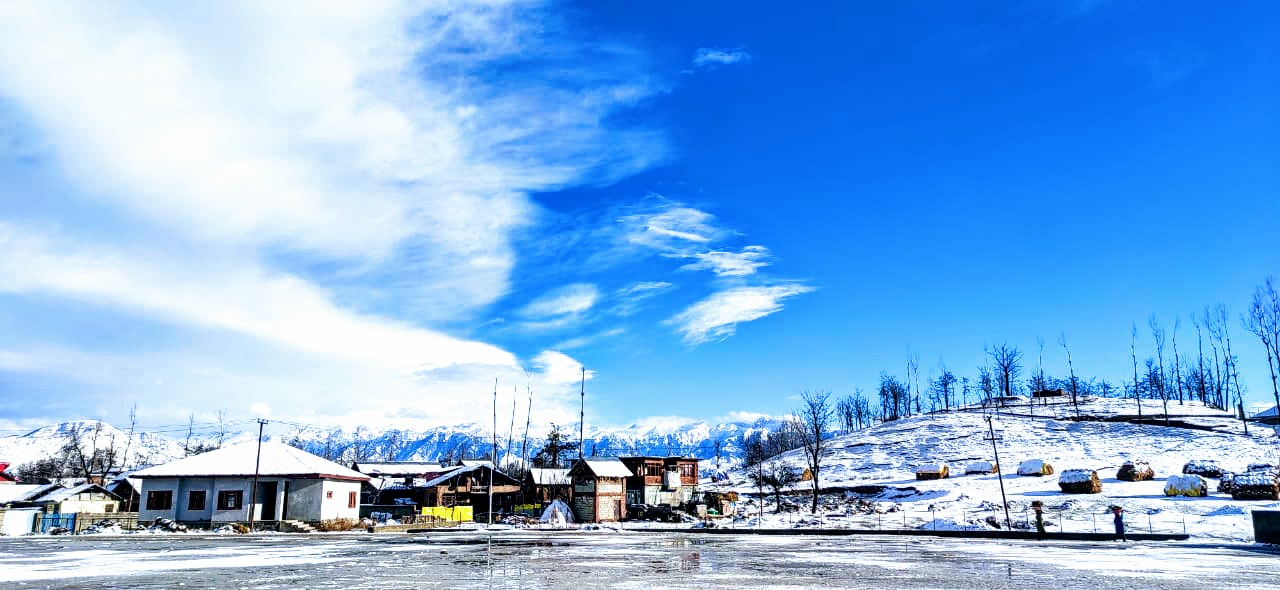

- Location in Jammu and Kashmir Darpeth (India)
- Coordinates: 33.8153°N 75.0012°E
- Country: India
- Union Territory: Jammu and Kashmir
- District: Pulwama
- Elevation: 1,596 m (5,236 ft)

Population
  - Total: est. 570

Languages
  - Official: Kashmiri, Hindi, Urdu, Dogri, English
- Time zone: UTC+5:30 (IST)
- PIN: 192305
- Telephone code: 01933

Darpeth is a locality in Aglar town of Pulwama district in Jammu and Kashmir. It is located 14 km east of Pulwama.

Most of the key institutions of Aglar town are located in Darpeth. Which includes Eid Gah Aglar, Sheep Husbandry Aglar, marriage hall, public park, community health and wellness centre, government high school, Jnv Aglar Shopian and Sports Stadium Aglar.
