= Herman, Shopian =

Herman Hermain
- Tehsil
- Location in Jammu and Kashmir, India
- Coordinates: 33.7°N 74.9°E
- Country: India
- State: Jammu and Kashmir
- District: Shopian

Population (2011)
  - Total: 513 families

Languages
  - Official: Kashmiri, Urdu, Hindi, Dogri, English
- Time zone: UTC+5:30 (IST)
- PIN Code: 192303
- Sex ratio: 1,728 ♀/ 1,606 ♂
- Literacy: 62.60%
- Distance from Shopian: 8.71 kilometres (5.41 mi)
- Distance from Srinagar: 46.43 kilometres (28.85 mi)

Herman or Hermain is a village and tehsil located in Shopian district of Jammu and Kashmir, India. It is situated 8.71 km (5.41 mi) away from its main town Shopian, the district headquarters of Shopian district. Herman was made a tehsil in 2014 by the State government of Jammu and Kashmir. Herman has 29 villages. In Herman there is a tehsil office in which a Tehsildar is serving the people.

== Agriculture ==
Agriculture is the main occupation of Herman village. Apple growing is the main source of livelihood of majority of households.

== Financial institutions ==
Banks and finance institutions has also established their branches in the village. In Hermain there is a branch of J&K Bank having an ATM. Ellaqui Dehatti Bank Branch. A branch of central cooperative bank also is working there.

== Population and geographical area ==
According to the 2011 census, Herman has a total population of 3,334 peoples. There are about 513 houses in Herman village. In 2011, the literacy rate of Herman village was 62.60%. In Herman, Male literacy stands at 72.44% while female literacy rate was 53.66%.

Particulars	Total	Male	Female
Total No. of Houses	513	-	-
Population	3,334	1,606	1,728
Child (0-6)	462	238	224
Literacy	62.60%	72.44%	53.66%

== See also ==
- Aloorah Shopian
- Dreri Kali Pora
