= Amin Kamil =

Poet and writer

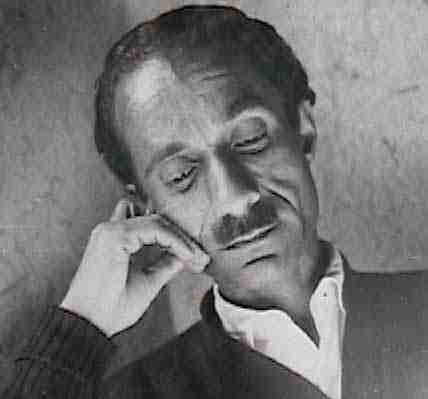
- Born: Muhammad Amin Nengroo; 3 August 1924; Kaprin, Jammu and Kashmir
- Died: 30 October 2014 (aged 90); Jammu, Jammu and Kashmir, India
- Citizenship: Kashmiri
- Occupations: Poet, fiction writer, literary critic, researcher, and editor
- Writing career
- Notable works: Gati Manz Gaash (1958), Kathi Manz Kath (1966), Lava ta Prava (1965), Beyi Suy Paan (1967), Padis Pod Tshay (1972), Yim Myani Sokhan (2001)
- Notable awards: Sahitya Akademi Award (1967), Padma Shri (2005)
- Movements: Progressive Writers Movement, Modernism

Amin Kamil (3 August 1924 – 30 October 2014) was a Kashmiri poet, literary critic, researcher and editor. He is also known for his short stories, a genre of which he was one of the pioneers in Kashmiri. He remains one of the most popular and influential masters of the Kashmiri language, leaving behind a legacy of literary brilliance.

== Life ==
Kamil was born at Kaprin, a village in South Kashmir. He graduated in Arts from the Punjab University and took his degree in Law from the Aligarh Muslim University. He joined the Bar in 1947 and continued to practice Law until 1949, when he was appointed a lecturer in Sri Pratap College, Srinagar. He was closely associated with Progressive Writers' Movement of that time and under its influence switched over from Urdu to Kashmiri as his medium of expression. He joined the State Cultural Academy when it was set up in 1958 and was appointed the Convener for the Kashmiri language. He later became Editor for Kashmiri and edited the two journals of the Academy – Sheeraza and Son Adab with distinction for many years. He retired from the service of the Academy in 1979.

== Fiction ==
In 1958, Gati Manz Gaash (Light amidst darkness) was published, a novel inspired by the well-known observation of Mahatma Gandhi in the context of the aftermath of the partition of the Indian subcontinent in 1947, that in the midst of darkness prevailing everywhere he had found a ray of light in Kashmir alone.

Kamil's collection of short stories, "Kathi Manz Kath" (Story within Story) published in mid-60s includes his most highly regarded work, "Kokar Jang" (The Cockfight). The Cockfight is considered as the most popular story in the Kashmiri literature. It has been translated into many Indian languages and has appeared in English translation in anthologies such as Indian Short Stories 1900–2000 edited by I. Vi. Ramakrishan; Contemporary Kashmiri Short Stories edited by Hriday Kaul Bharati, Neerja Mattoo; Contemporary Indian Short Stories Vol 3 all published by Sahitya Akademi, New Delhi. The Cockfight is prescribed in the school and university curriculum in Jammu and Kashmir. It has also appeared in Best Loved Indian Stories of the Century published by Penguin India in 1999. Prof. J. L. Koul writes about this story that "...perhaps, the comic muse at its subtlest best (though not unmixed with irony) in Kashmiri short story is to be seen in Amin Kamil's Hini Rahman and Kokar Jang, particularly in the latter, in which the foibles and eccentricities of character of the two women neighbors, Jaana Bits and Shah Maal, are expressed through their respective cocks." Kamil has a special talent for blending humour, irony and politics/social comment in his stories as well as poems. As an example of this, in his poems, is "Taay Nama" published in mid-80s. Kamil's poems as well as stories frequently comment on the socio-political situation of Kashmir. In this connection, his story "Sawal Chu Kaluk" Enigma has received much acclaim.

== Poetry ==
Writing in The Encyclopedia of Indian Literature, Ghulam Nabi Gauhar says of Kamil: "He is a master of Kashmiri Ghazal and has to his credit poems of eternal value."

== Awards and honours ==
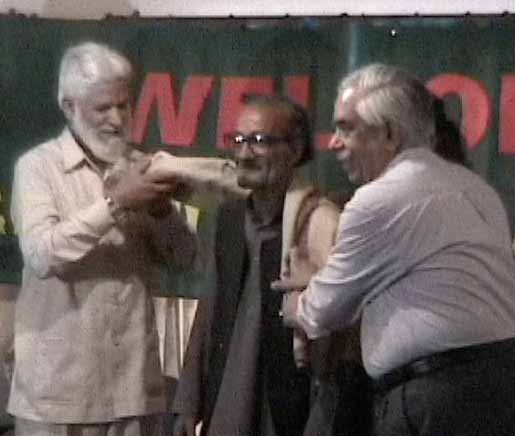
Amin Kamil receiving Robe of Honor

Amin Kamil won the Sahitya Akademi Award in 1967 for his book of poems, Laveh Te Praveh.

Kamil has won awards from the Jammu & Kashmir Cultural Academy, the State Government of Jammu & Kashmir, Robes of Honor from many prestigious organisations, Sahitya Akademi Award (1967) International Irfan Foundation Award, Kashmir University's Lifetime Achievement Award, and Padma Shri in the year 2005 (Literature & Education) from the Indian government. Recently, a two-day national seminar on Amin Kamil was held at Aligarh Muslim University in which Kamil was recognised. Jammu & Kashmir Academy of Art, Culture and Languages published a special issue of its literary magazine Sheeraza on Amin Kamil's life and works, which was released in Srinagar in Summer 2011.

== Death ==
Amin Kamil died on 30 October 2014, Thursday morning, in Jammu. He was 90 years old.

== See also ==
- List of Sahitya Akademi Award winners for Kashmiri
