= Nikloora =

- Village
- Location in Jammu and Kashmir Nikloora (India)
- Coordinates: 33.8153°N 75.0012°E
- Country: India
- Union Territory: Jammu and Kashmir
- Tehsil: Shahoora
- District: Pulwama
- Elevation: 1,588 m (5,210 ft)

Population
  - Total: 1,212

Languages
  - Official: Kashmiri, Hindi, Urdu, Dogri, English
- Time zone: UTC+5:30 (IST)

Niklora is a village located in Pulwama district of Jammu and Kashmir. It is situated on the left bank of Rambi river. It comprises Bonpora, New colony areas.
