= Devepora =

Devepora Devpur Devpura
- Village
- Location in Jammu and Kashmir, India Devepora (India)
- Coordinates: 34.19°N 74.72°E
- Country: India
- union territory: Jammu and Kashmir
- District: Shopian

Population (2011)
  - Total: 1,424 householders

Languages
  - Official: Kashmiri, Urdu, Hindi, Dogri, English
  - Spoken: Gujari, Pahari
- Time zone: UTC+5:30 (IST)
- PIN Code: 192303

Devepora (also known as Dev Pora or Devpura) is a large village located in the forest block of Shopian district in the Indian union territory of Jammu and Kashmir in the disputed Kashmir region. The village is located in hill area of district Shopian which is 6 kilometers away from its town. There is no hospital or primary health dispensary.

== Population ==
According to 2011 census, Devepora has a total of 1,424 families. The village has population of 8,275 of which 4,514 are males while remaining 3,761 are females. The average sex ratio of Devepora village is 833. The village has very low literacy rates compared to other villages in Jammu and Kashmir. In Devepora Male literacy stands at 38.66% while female literacy rate was 21.82%.
