= Rajesh Kumar Chhibber =

Indian banker

- राजेश कुमार छिब्बर

Chairman & CEO of Jammu and Kashmir Bank
- In office 10 June 2019 – 27 October 2021
- Governor: Manoj Sinha
- Preceded by: Parvez Ahmad
- Succeeded by: Baldev Prakash

Rajesh Kumar Chhibber is an Indian banker and was the former CEO and managing director of Jammu and Kashmir Bank (J&K Bank).

== Banking career ==
Chhibber joined the services of J&K Bank as Probationary Officer in 1982.

Chhibber was appointed as interim chairman and managing director of J&K bank from 10 June 2019 after fraud allegations against the previous chairman. He was promoted and served as the chairman and managing director of the bank under section 10BB of the Banking Regulation Act, 1949 from 10 October 2019.

In 2019, following the formation of the union territories of Jammu and Kashmir, the Anti-corruption Bureau started investigations into alleged corrupt practices by a number of bank officials, including former bank chairpersons Parvaiz Ahmad Nengroo and Mushtaq Ahmad Sheikh.

In June 2019, the Reserve Bank of India approved the appointment of Chhibber as interim chairman and managing director (CMD) of the bank, following the removal of Parvez Ahmad from the post by the state government.

He also served as the chairman of J&K Grameen Bank an Indian Regional Rural Bank. He was elevated as the Executive President on 1 June 2018.
He was succeeded by Baldev Prakash on 27 October 2021.
