= Mahmoud Abbas (disambiguation) =

Mahmoud Abbas (born 1935) is a Palestinian politician.

Mahmoud Abbas may also refer to:

- Mahmoud Abbas (cyclist) (born 1978), Egyptian cyclist who competed at the 2000 Summer Olympics
- Mahmoud Abbas (footballer) (born 1988), Arab-Israeli footballer

== See also ==
- Muhammad Abbas (disambiguation)
