= Mohammed Abbas (football coach) =

Egyptian football manager

Personal information
- Full name: Mohammed Moshir Abbas
- Place of birth: Egypt

Senior career*
Years	Team	Apps	(Gls)
- Al-Masry SC

Managerial career
- Al-Masry SC
- 2004–2006: Uganda
- * Club domestic league appearances and goals

Mohammed Abbas (Arabic: محمد عباس) is an Egyptian football former coach.

== Uganda ==
Assigned the Uganda national team manager role in 2004 as part of an agreement between the Ugandan and Egyptian governments, Abbas sought to put a sense of discipline into the squad upon arrival, targeting a place at the 2006 Africa Cup of Nations. However, despite leading the Cranes to a 2010 World Cup qualifying victory over Ecuador in 2006, the Egyptian tactician was relieved of his duties by March that year and was given an indemnification package worth 6000 US dollars following his dismissal.

On account of Uganda's display at the 2005 CECAFA Cup, a number of African countries, including Ethiopia, Sudan, and Rwanda expressed interest in hiring Abbas as their head coach but he chose to remain with the Cranes.
