= Reshnagri =

- Village
- Location in Jammu and Kashmir, India
- Coordinates: 33.6°N 74.8°E
- Country: India
- State: Jammu and Kashmir
- District: Shopian

Area
  - Total: 5 km^{2} (1.9 sq mi)
  - Rank: 12th in Shopian

Population (2011)
  - Total: 558 Housesholders
  - Density: 110/km^{2} (290/sq mi)

Languages
  - Official: Kashmiri, Hindi, Urdu, Dogri, English
- Time zone: UTC+5:30 (IST)
- PIN Code: 192303
- Literacy: 54.28%
- Distance from Shopian: 9 kilometres (5.6 mi)

Reshnagri is a village located in Shopian district of Indian union territory of Jammu and Kashmir. Reshnagri is the combination of two Sanskrit words "Resh" (priest) and "nagri" (land) which means the land of priests. Its headquarters are located in Shopian which is ten km away from the village. Reshnagri is situated on the banks of Veshaw River which comes under south-western part of Kashmir Valley. The village is divided into five parts: Darul Rehmat, Darul Barkaat, Darul Salaam, Darul Anwaar, Darul Fazl.

== Demographics ==
As per the census of India 2011, the Reshnagri is the home of 558 householders which further extends to 3036 individuals, of which 1554 are males while 1482 are females. About 99% of the population belong to the Ahmadiyya Muslim Community. The total geographical area of Reshnagri is 515.6 hectares and it is the 5th biggest village by area in Shopian district.
