= Panzer (surname) =

Panzer is a surname. Notable people with the surname include:

- Edwina P. Dalton (born 1936, née Panzer), American politician
- Jeff Panzer, American music producer, music video producer and record label executive
- Jeff Panzer (ice hockey) (born 1978), American ice hockey player
- Frank E. Panzer (1890–1969), American farmer, schoolteacher, and politician
- Georg Wolfgang Franz Panzer (1755–1829), German physician, botanist and entomologist
- Marty Panzer (born 1945), American songwriter
- Mary Panzer (born 1951), American banker and politician, daughter of Frank Panzer
- Paul Panzer (1872–1958), German-American silent film actor
