= Hirpora Wildlife Sanctuary =

Wildlife Sanctuary in Jammu and Kashmir

- IUCN category IV (habitat/species management area)
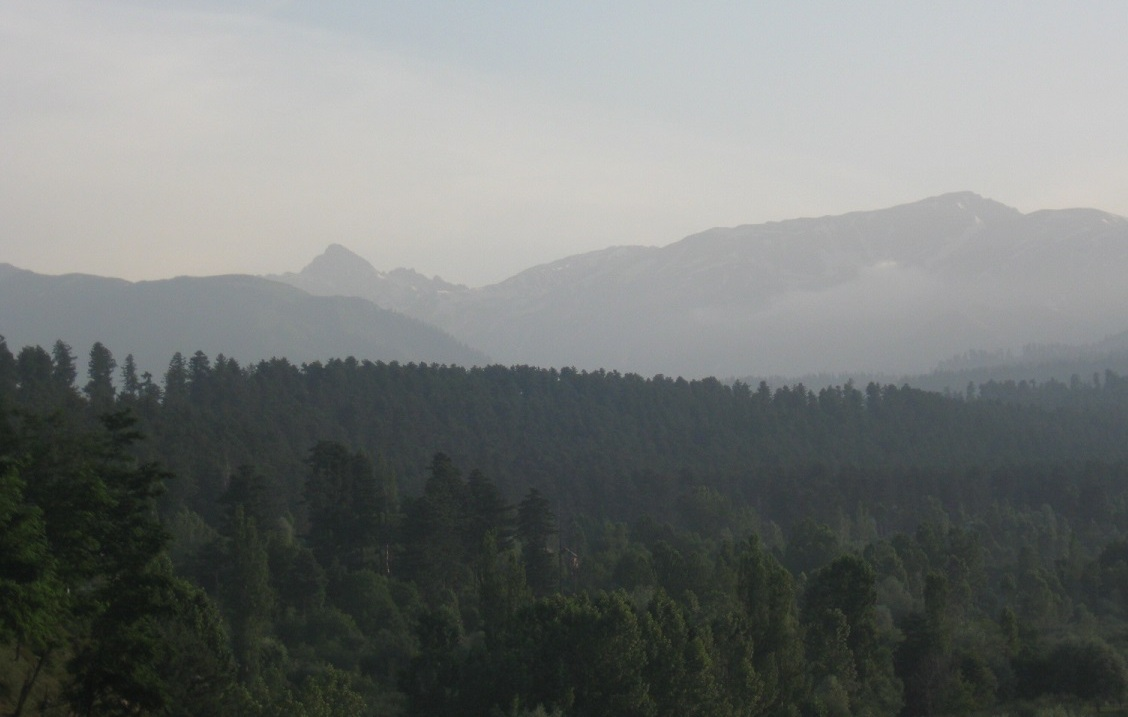
- A view of the Hirpora Wildlife Sanctuary, Hirpora in Shopian district, Jammu and Kashmir

- Location within Jammu and Kashmir Location within India
- Interactive map of Hirpora Wildlife Sanctuary
- Location: Kulgam district and Shopian district, Jammu and Kashmir
- Nearest city: Shopian town
- Coordinates: 33°35′56″N 74°36′56″E
- Area: 341 km^{2} (132 sq mi)
- Established: 1987
- Operator: Wildlife Protection Department, J&K
- Administrator: Government of Jammu and Kashmir
- Website: www.jkwildlife.com

Hirpora Wildlife Sanctuary or Heerpora Wildlife Sanctuary is located in Kulgam district and Shopian district of Jammu and Kashmir in the disputed Kashmir region. It lies 12 km from Shopian town, 70 km (43 mi) south of Srinagar. It spreads over an area of 341 km^{2} (132 sq mi). It is bounded to the north by Lake Gumsar, northeast by Hirpora village, east by Rupri, south by Saransar and to the west by the Pir Panjal pass. The slopes are gentle to moderately steep on the eastern aspect and very steep with many cliffs on the higher northern and western aspect. The southern and southeastern portions are moderately steep. Heerpora wildlife sanctuary is one of the beautiful wildlife sanctuary in Jammu and Kashmir

== Flora ==
The vegetation types present in the Hirpora Wildlife Sanctuary include western mixed coniferous forests, deciduous sub-alpine scrub forests and sub-alpine pastures. Western mixed coniferous forest is dominated by Kail pine with spruce and fir (Abies pindrow) as its primary associates. The West Himalayan sub-alpine forests are dominated by fir, while the deciduous sub-alpine scrub is dominated by Himalayan birch (Betula utilis) and juniper (Juniperus communis) with wild rose as an associate. The southeastern part has moderately open coniferous vegetation dominated by Kail pine and associated with fir and spruce. The vegetation of the more rocky and open northwestern portion is predominantly sub-alpine scrub forest dominated by juniper and the Kail pine as an associated species. Man-made sub-alpine pastures also occur in both north-western and south-eastern parts of the sanctuary.

== Fauna ==
The Hirpora Wildlife Sanctuary is an abode to many species of animals including the Himalayan brown bear, Himalayan black bear, musk deer, leopard, Tibetan wolf, Himalayan palm civet and around 50 individuals the critically endangered Pir Panjal markhor. Besides, 130 species of birds including the spotted forktail, western tragopan, rock bunting, rufous-breasted accentor, Himalayan woodpecker, blue rock thrush, white-capped redstart, Himalayan griffon, common stonechat, red-billed blue magpie and grey wagtail are found in the sanctuary.

== Disturbance ==
The Mughal Road cuts through the Hirpora Wildlife Sanctuary and is believed to inhibit the movement of animals, especially the critically endangered Pir Panjal markhor. The Sanctuary has also been disturbed due to deforestation, excessive livestock grazing and construction of permanent huts by the Gujjars, Bakerwals and local shepherds.

== Gallery ==
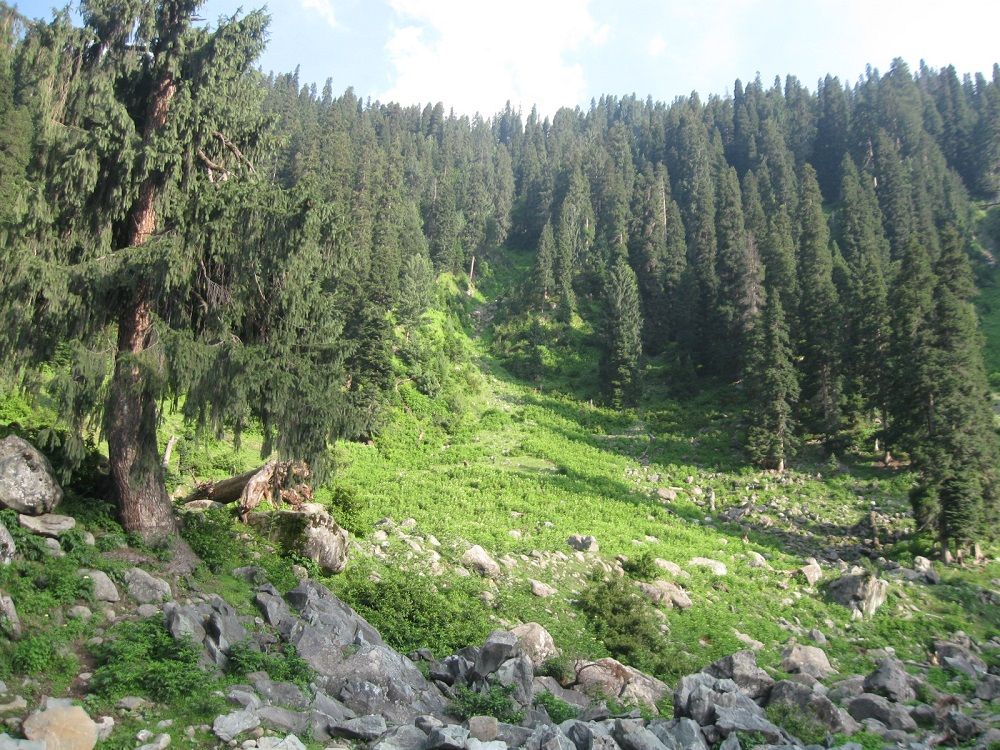
A view of the Hirpora Wildlife Sanctuary from the Mughal Road.

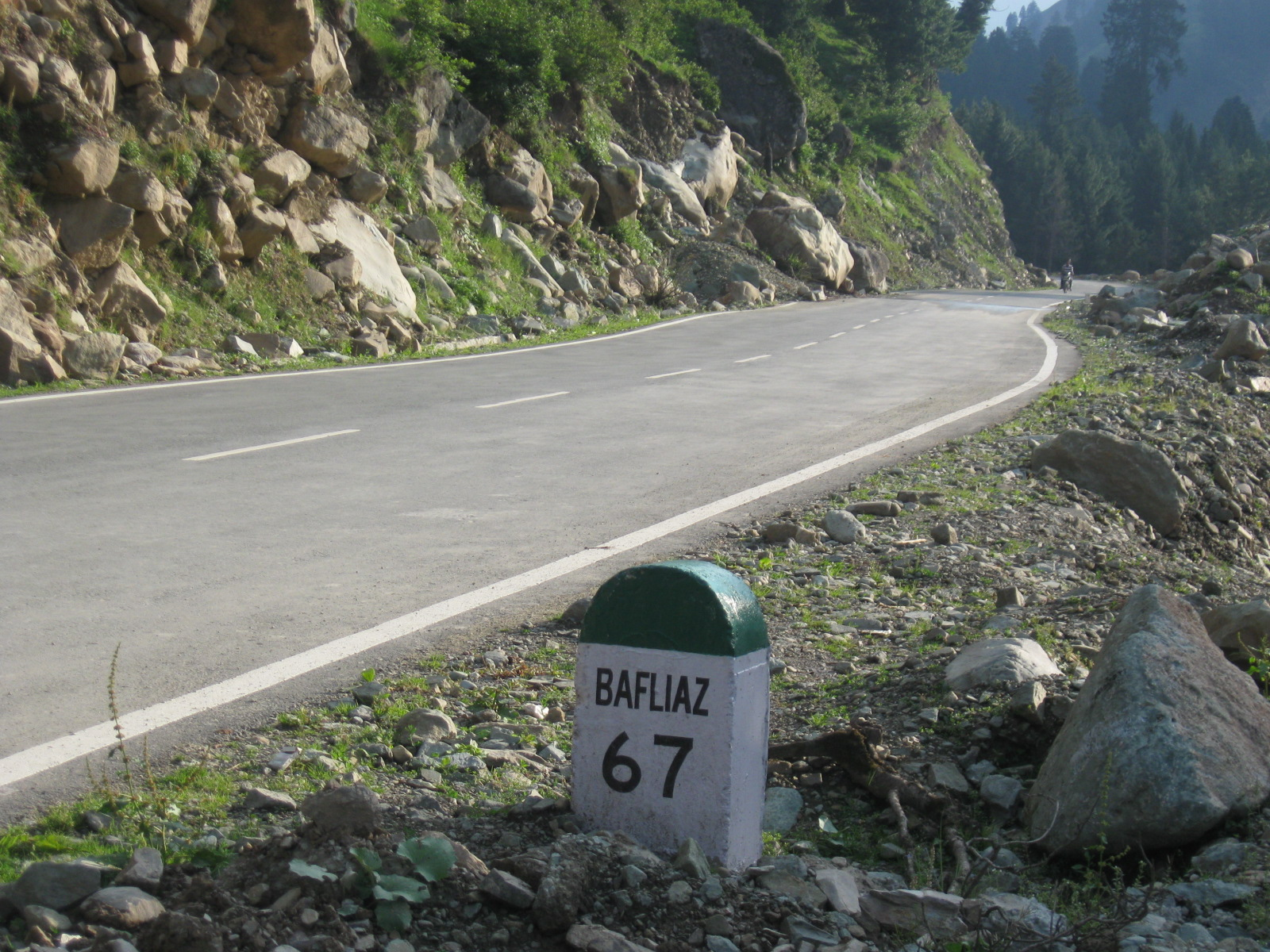
A view of the Mughal Road, which cuts through the Hirpora Wildlife Sanctuary.

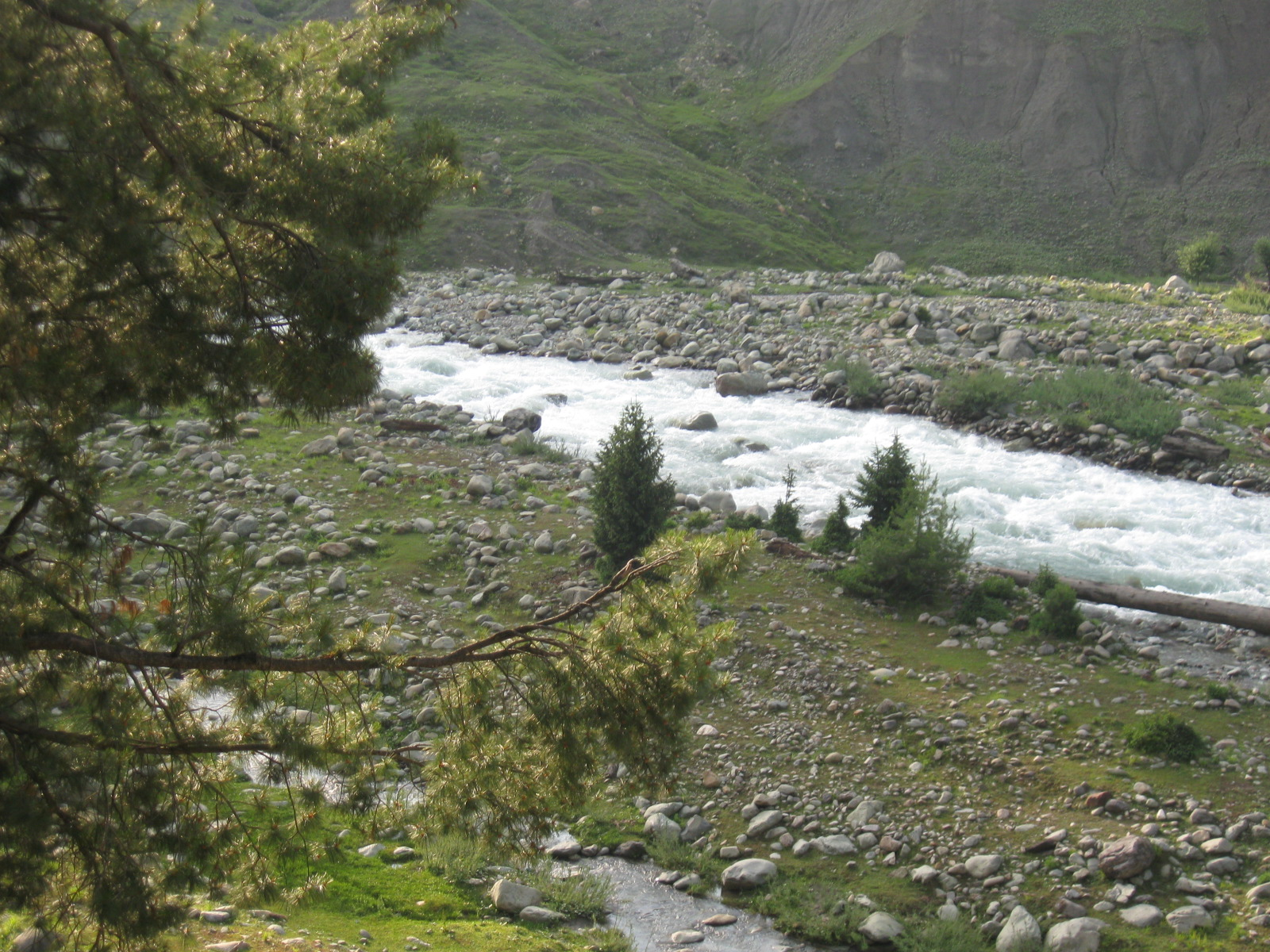
A stream flowing through the Hirpora Wildlife Sanctuary.

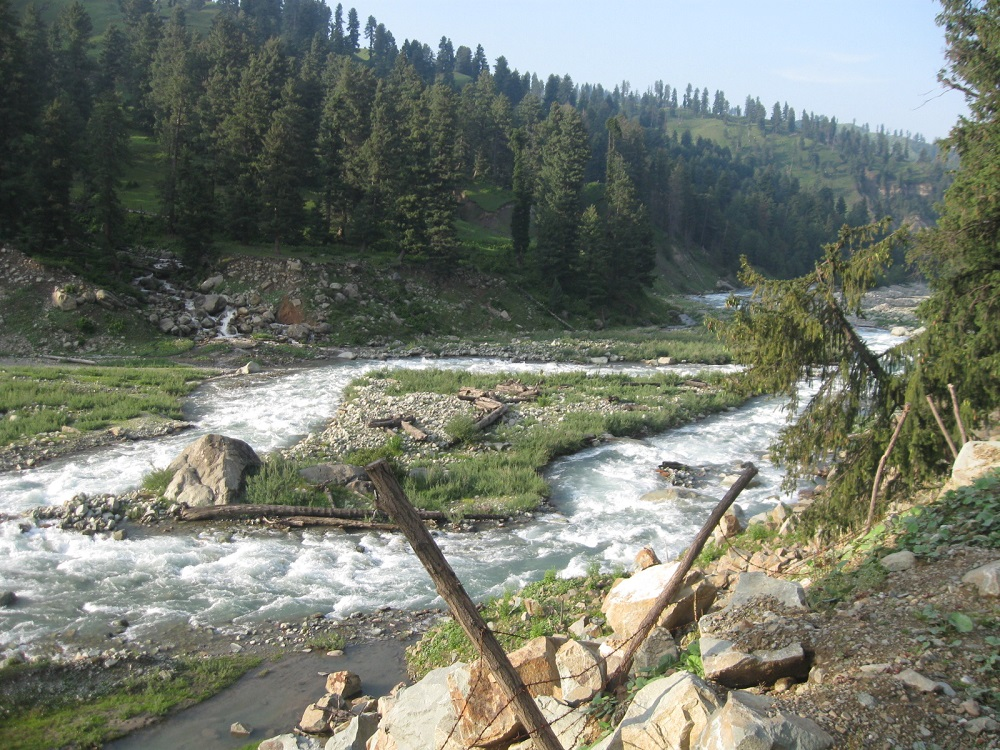
A stream flowing through the Hirpora Wildlife Sanctuary in Shopian district of Kashmir.

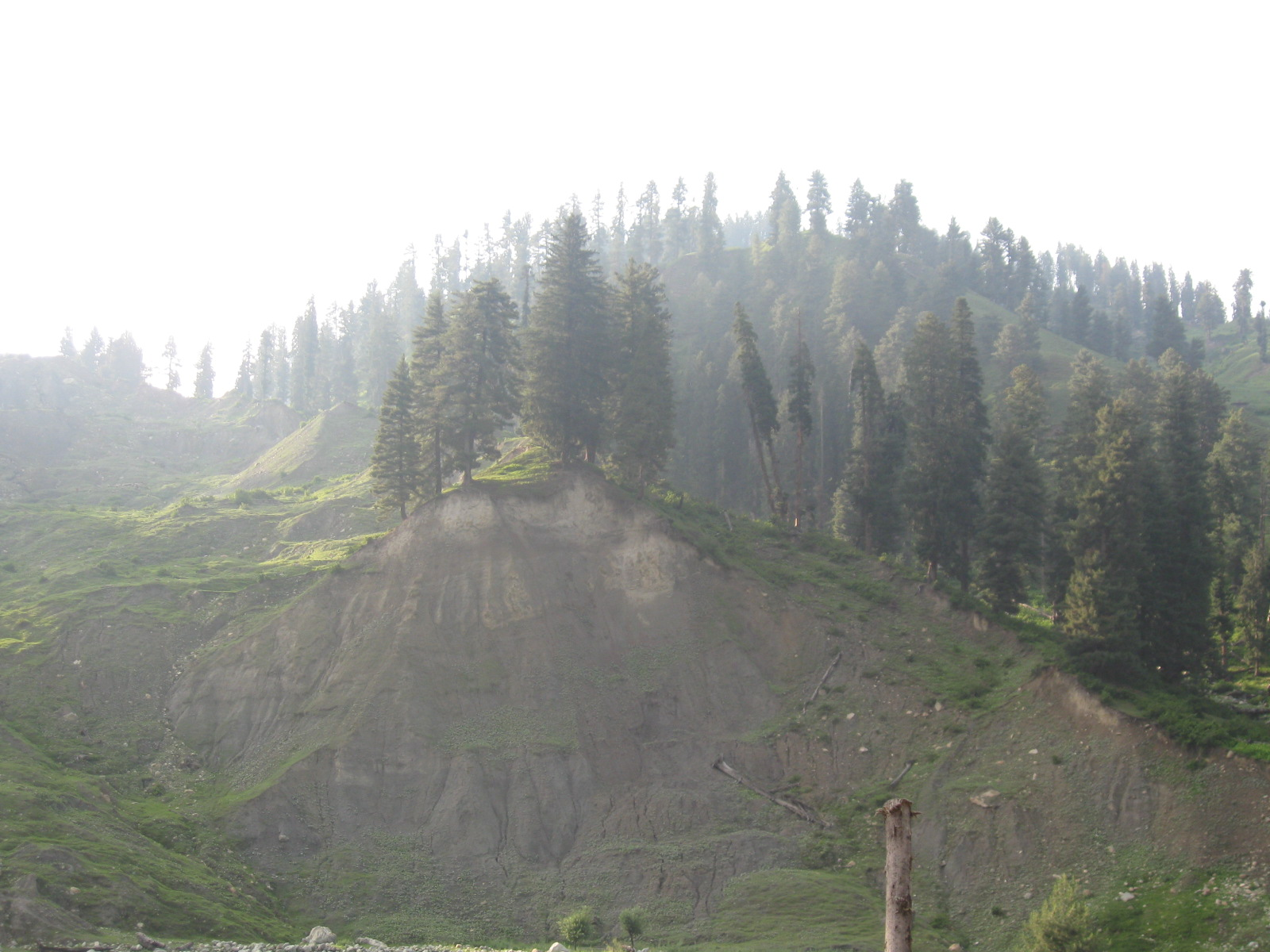
Hirpora Wildlife Sanctuary (As seen from Mughal Road).

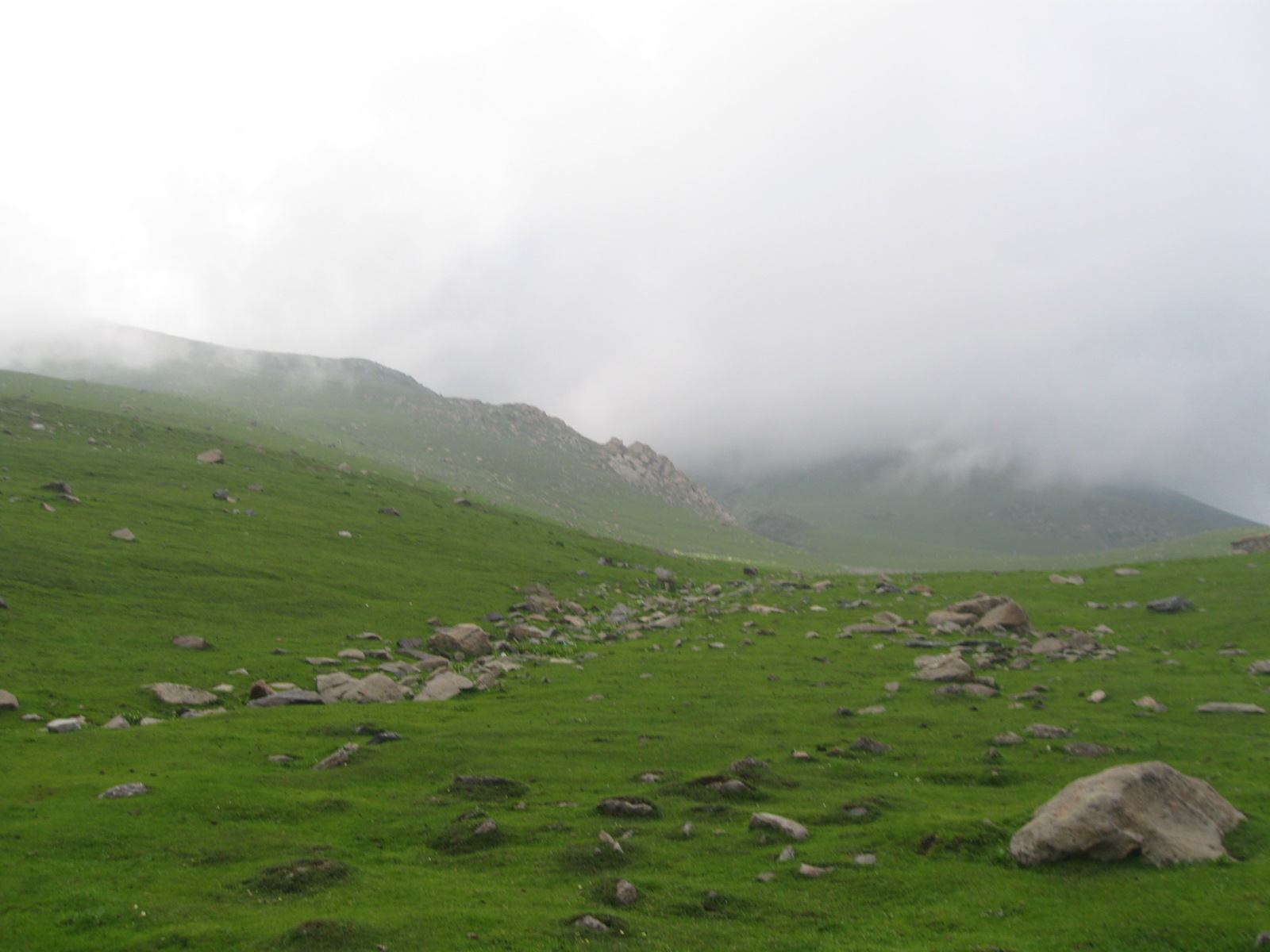
Lush green Pastures of the Hirpora Wildlife Sanctuary at Pir Ki Gali.

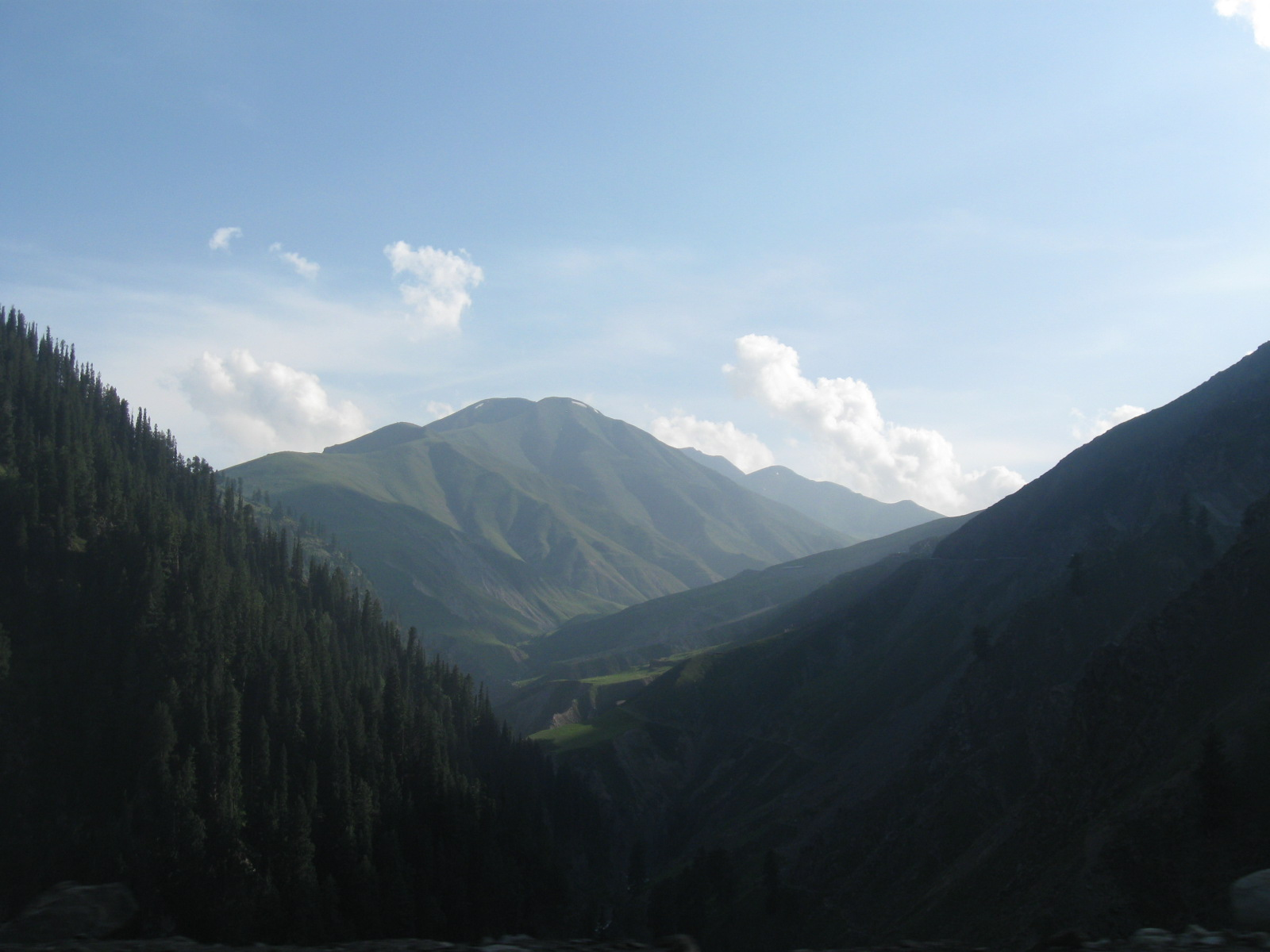
The Hirpora Wildlife Sanctuary has dense Coniferous Forests & difficult terrain.

== See also ==
- Dachigam National Park
- Overa-Aru Wildlife Sanctuary
- Gulmarg Wildlife Sanctuary
- Kishtwar National Park
