= Chakoora, Pulwama =

Chakoora Pulwama
- Town
- Chakoora Pulwama
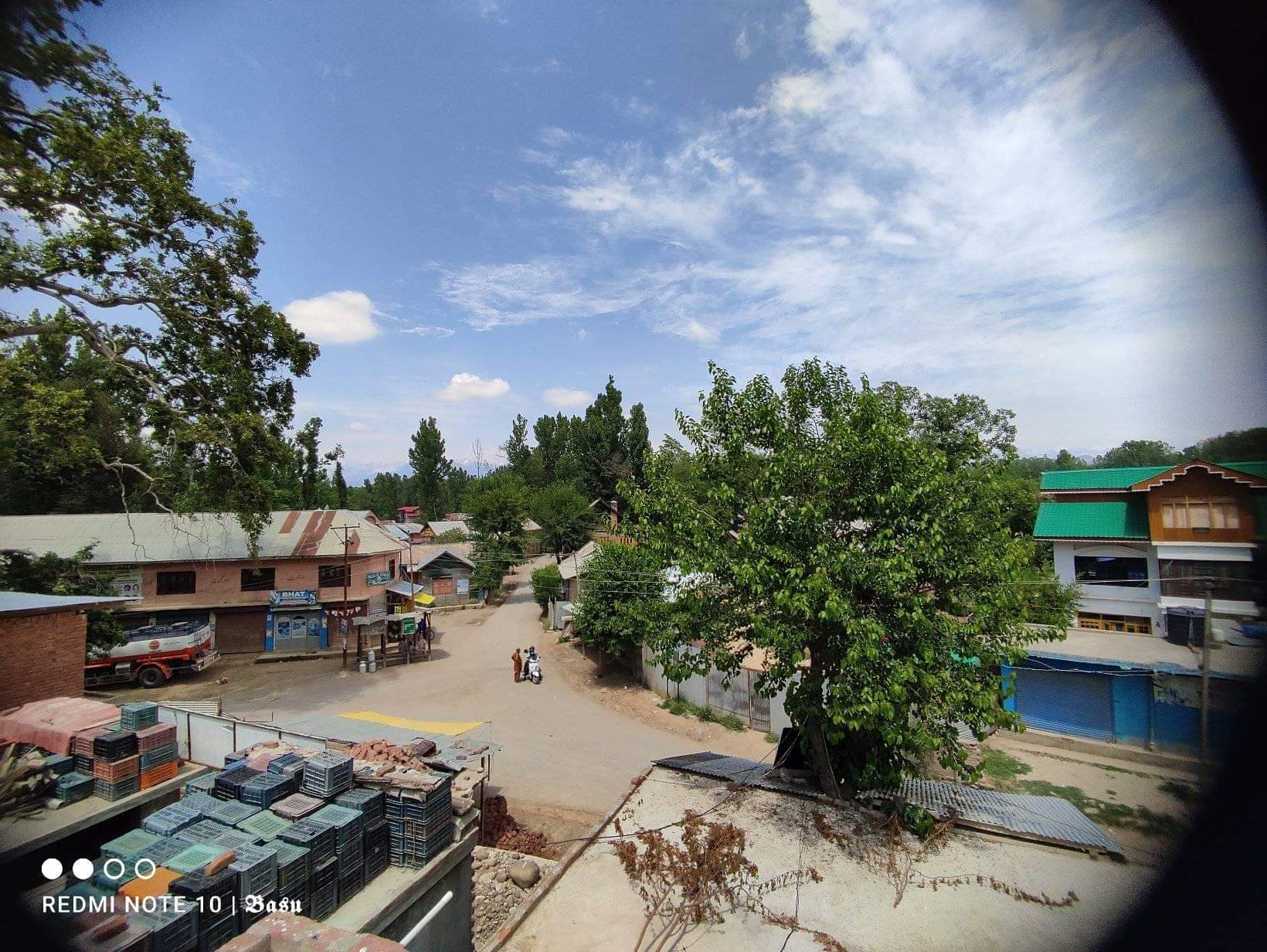
- Main Market Chakoora Pulwama

- Location in Jammu and Kashmir, India
- Coordinates: 33.8311°N 75.0167°E
- Country: India
- State/Union Territory: Jammu and Kashmir
- Division: Kashmir Division
- District: Pulwama
- Tehsil/Block: Litter, Pulwama

Area
  - Total: 3.47 km^{2} (1.34 sq mi)
  - Rank: 36th
- Elevation: 1,588 m (5,210 ft)

Population (2011)
  - Total: 2,102
  - Rank: 36th

Languages
  - Official: Kashmiri, Urdu, Hindi, Dogri, English
- Time zone: UTC+5:30 (IST)
- Postal code: 192301
- Area code: 01933
- Vehicle registration: JK13
- Website: https://pulwama.gov.in

Chakoora is notified area and town in Pulwama district of Jammu and Kashmir, India. It is located 17 km towards east from District headquarters Pulwama and 37 km from the summer capital of Srinagar. It is situated on the Boundary of Pulwama District.
