= Amshipora =

Amshipora Amashpur
- Village
- Location in Jammu and Kashmir, India
- Coordinates: 33.68°N 74.84°E
- Country: India
- State: Jammu and Kashmir
- District: Shopian

Area
  - Total: 1.951 km^{2} (0.753 sq mi)
- Elevation: 1,594 m (5,230 ft)

Population (2011)
  - Total: 1,712
  - Density: 877.5/km^{2} (2,273/sq mi)

Languages
  - Official: Kashmiri, Hindi, Urdu, Dogri, English
- Time zone: UTC+5:30 (IST)
- PIN Code: 192303
- Literacy: 59.3%
- Distance from Shopian: 6.5 kilometres (4.0 mi)

Amshipora or Amshi Pora (locally known as Amashpoor) is a village situated in Shopian district of Jammu and Kashmir, India.

== Geography ==
It is situated 6 km (3.7 mi) to the South of Shopian town, the district headquarters. The village is connected to Shopian by a metalled road & is bounded by Saidpora Bala and Saidpora Payeen in the north, Vehil-Shamsipora in the east, Ramnagri (Jumnagar) in the south and Sedow in the west.

== Demographics & Economy ==
According to 2011 Census of India, Amshipora hosts about 300 households, with a population of about 2000. Islam is the religion of its entire population.The main occupation of its people is cultivation of fruits, especially apple.
