= Litter, Pulwama district =

Litar Shahoora Pulwama
- Town
- Litar Shahoora Pulwama
- Location in Jammu and Kashmir, India Litar Shahoora Pulwama (India)
- Coordinates: 33.8153°N 75.0012°E
- Country: India
- State: Kashmir
- Tehsil: Shahoora
- District: Pulwama
- Elevation: 1,588 m (5,210 ft)

Languages
  - Official: Kashmiri, Urdu, Hindi, Dogri, English
- Time zone: UTC+5:30 (IST)
- PIN: 192301
- Telephone code: 01933
- Vehicle registration: JK13
- Website: https://pulwama.gov.in/

Litar Shahoora is a notified area and a town in Pulwama district of Jammu and Kashmir, India. It is located 13 km (8.1 mi) towards east from District headquarters Pulwama and 40 km (25 mi) from the summer capital of Srinagar. It is situated on the banks of Rambi Ara, which line Litar Shahoora Pulwama with Aglar.

The tehsil headquarters of Shahoora tehsil are located in Litar.

The main locations which attract people are the shrine of Ziyarat-e-Sayiddah, which is under maintained by Tourist Department, which enhances the beauty of town.

== Transport ==
Litter is well traffic connected with Pulwama, Anantnag and Shopian. The nearest railway stations to Litter are Bijbehara railway station and Panzgam railway station.

== Education ==
A government higher secondary school, government boys' and girls' school and few SSA schools are also in the two. Besides government schools there are 4-5 private schools located in the area.
