= Shopian district =

Shopian district Shupyan
- District of Jammu and Kashmir administered by India
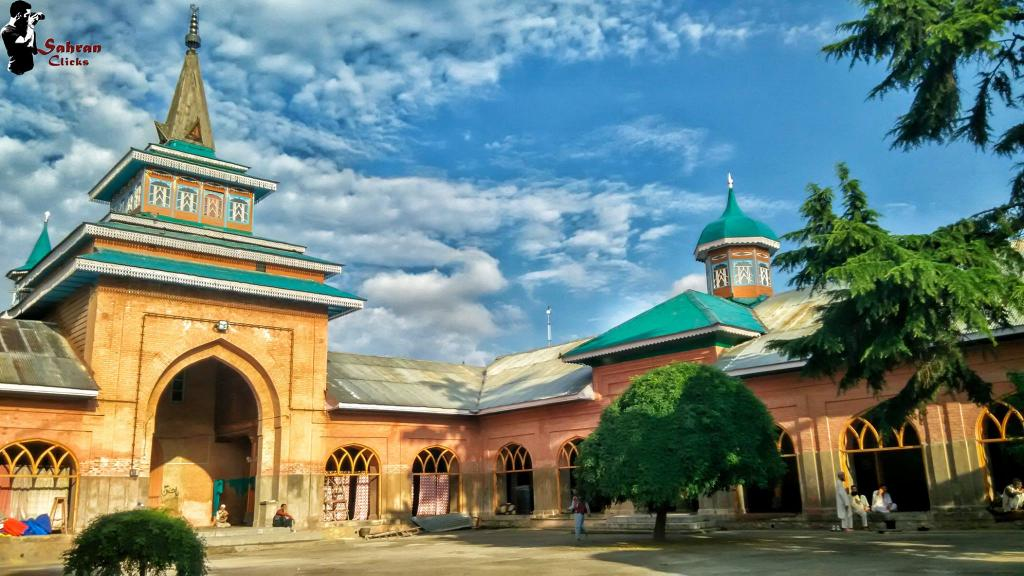
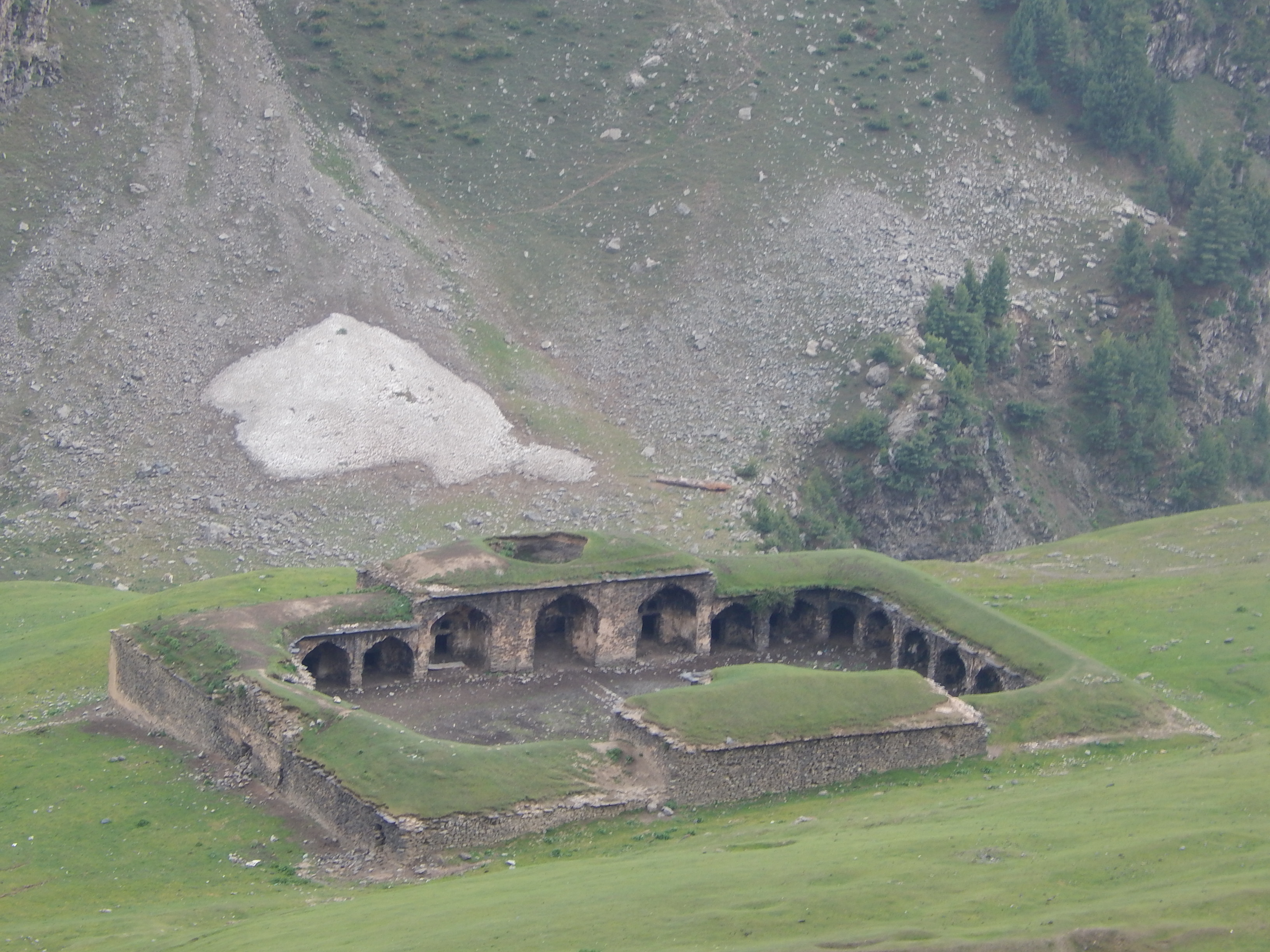
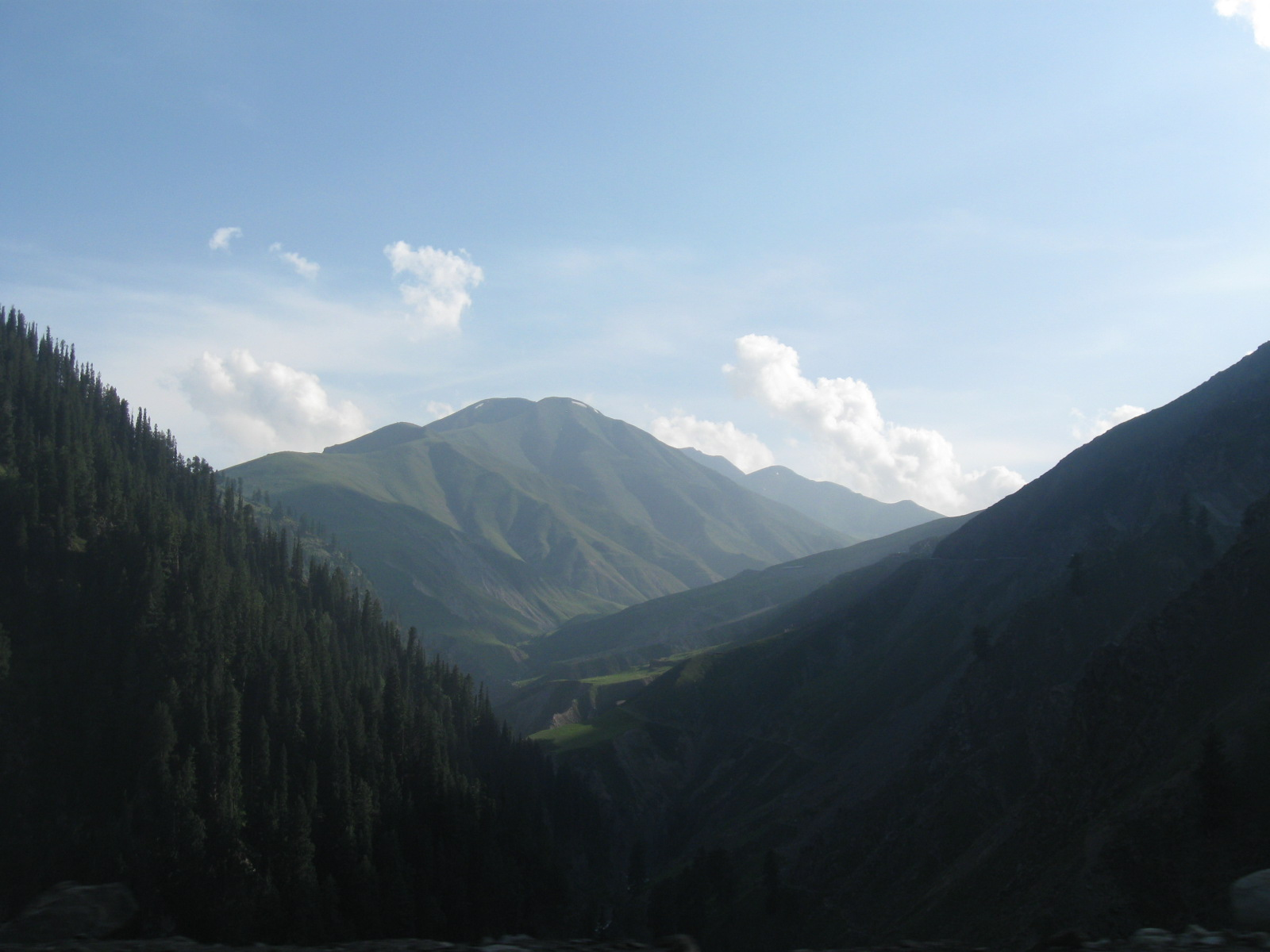
- From the top: Historical Jamia Masjid, Shopian, Historical Aliabad Sarai and Hirpora Wildlife Sanctuary
- Interactive map of Shopian district
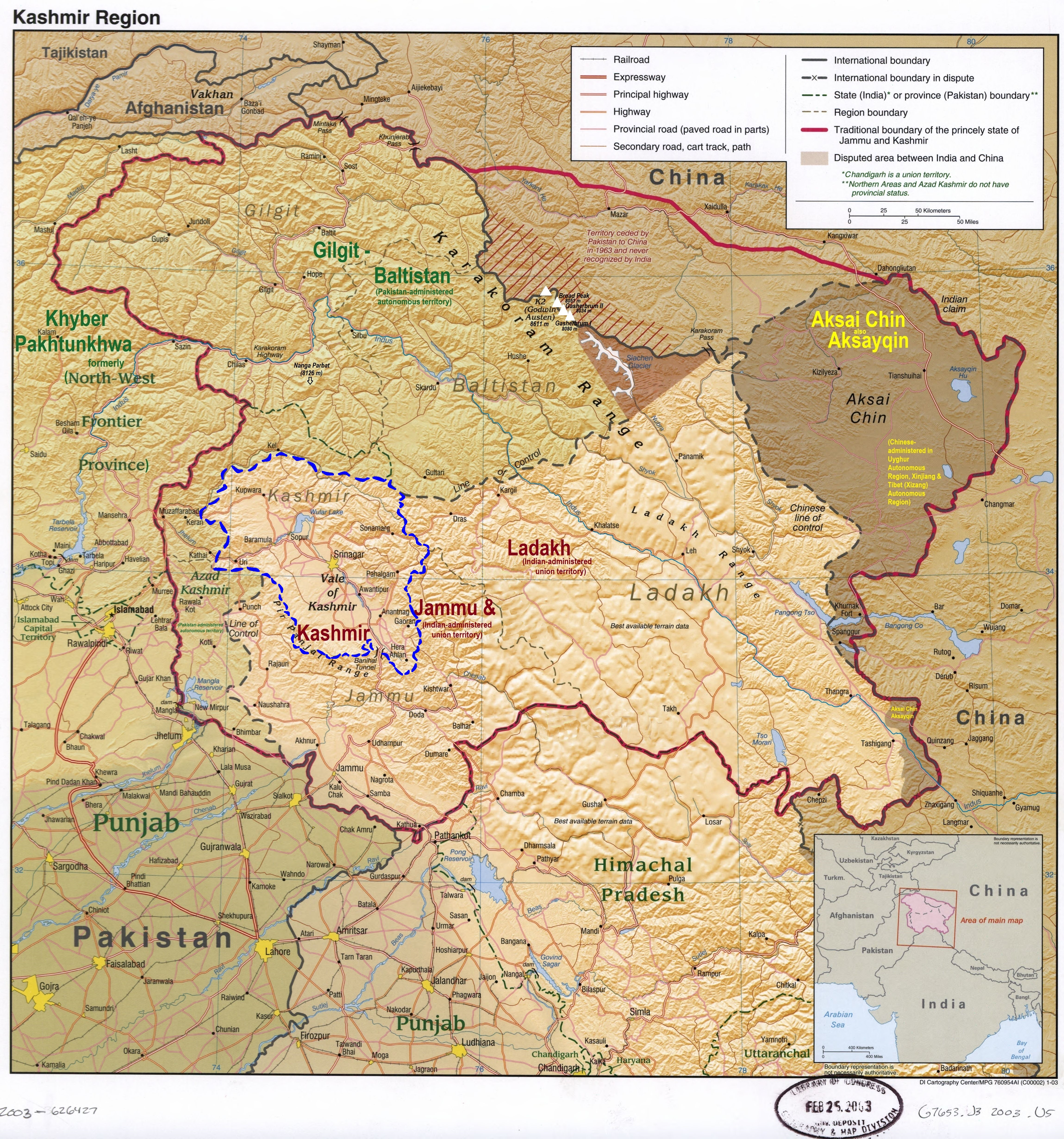
- Shopian district is in Indian-administered Jammu and Kashmir in the disputed Kashmir region. It is in the Kashmir division (bordered in neon blue).
- Coordinates (Shopian): 33.72°N 74.83°E
- Administering country: India
- Union Territory: Jammu and Kashmir
- Headquarters: Shopian

Area
  - Total: 612.9 km^{2} (236.6 sq mi)
  - Rank: 537th in India and 17th in Jammu & Kashmir

Population (Census 2011)
  - Total: 266,215
  - Density: 434.4/km^{2} (1,125/sq mi)

Languages
  - Official: Kashmiri, Urdu, Hindi, Dogri, English
- Time zone: UTC+5:30 (IST)
- Postal code: 192303
- Vehicle registration: JK-22
- Website: http://shopian.nic.in

Shopian district (Urdu pronunciation: [ʃoːpɪjɑ̃ː]), known as Shupyan (Kashmiri pronunciation: [ʃupʲjan]) in Kashmiri, is an administrative district of Indian-administered Jammu and Kashmir in the disputed Kashmir region.

It is a hill district with its administrative headquarters in Shopian town.

As it is situated on the historical road commonly known as Mughal Road, much of its area is covered by forests. Shopian district lies under the Pir Panjal Range, which makes it very cold during winter.

After the partition of India, it was a tehsil of Pulwama district. In March 2007, district status was granted by the Government of India.

The economy of the district depends on agriculture, particularly apple growing.

Shopian district is called "the apple bowl of Kashmir".

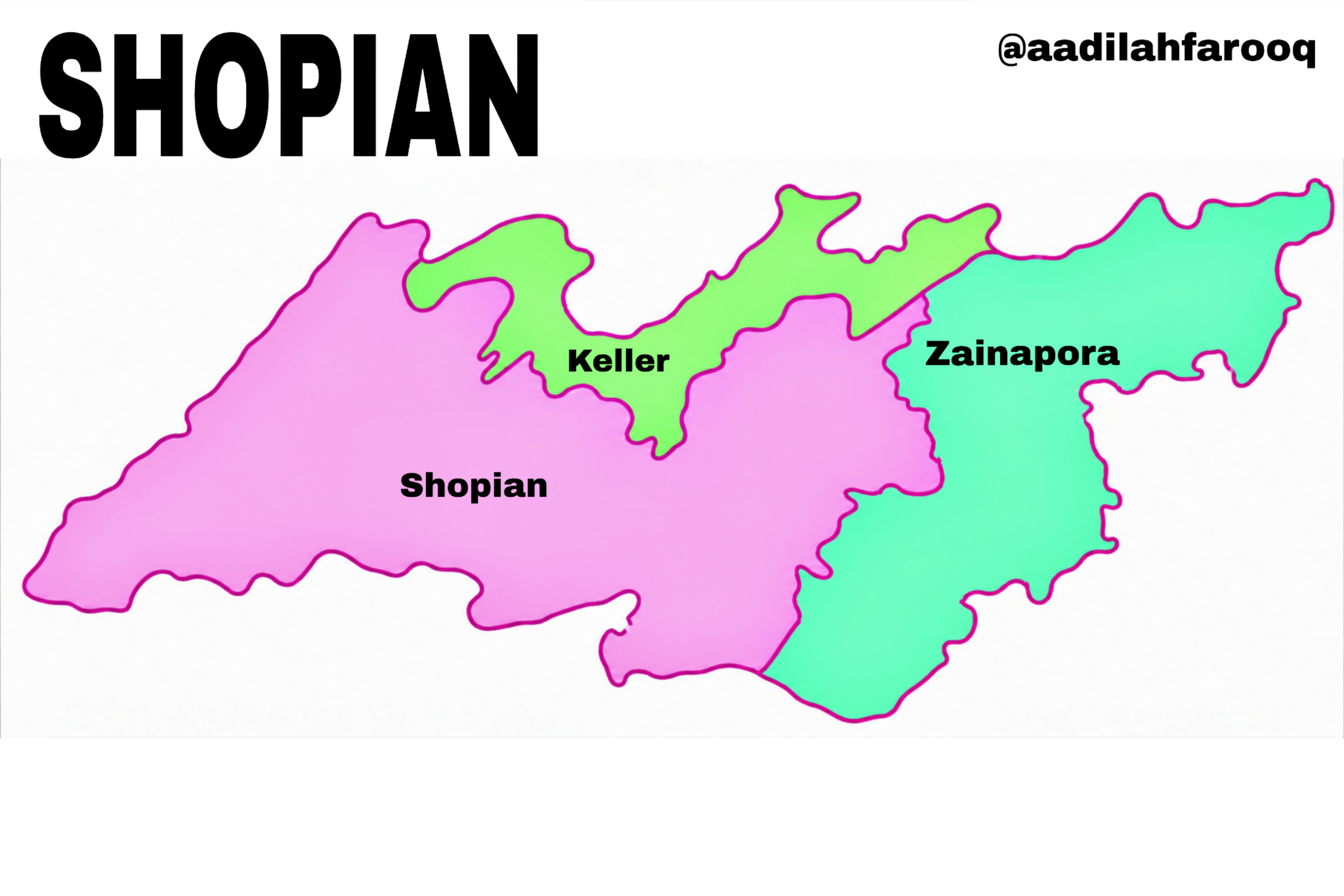
District map of Shopian

== Demographics ==
According to the 2011 census, the Shopian district has a population of 266,215. This gives the Shopian district a ranking of 577th in India (out of a total of 640). The district has a population density of 852 inhabitants per square kilometre (2,210/sq mi) . Its population growth rate over the 2001–2011 decade was 25.85%. Shopian has a sex ratio of 951 females for every 1,000 males (this varies with religion), and a literacy rate of 62.49%. 6.15% of the population lives in urban areas. Scheduled Castes and Scheduled Tribes make up 0.02% and 8.20% of the population respectively.

Religion in Shopian district (2011)
Religion	Percent
Islam	98.52%
Hinduism	1.17%
Other or not stated	0.31%

Sex Ratio in Shopian District in 2011 Census. (no. females per 1,000 males)
Religion (and population)	Sex Ratio
Muslim (pop 262,263)	968
Hindu (pop 3,116)	122
Other (pop 836)	779
Total (pop 266,215)	951

Shopian (Shupiyan) district: religion, gender ratio, and % urban of population, according to the 2011 Census.
	Hindu	Muslim	Christian	Sikh	Buddhist	Jain	Other	Not stated	Total
Total	3,116	262,263	429	178	6	1	6	216	266,215
Total	1.17%	98.52%	0.16%	0.07%	0.00%	0.00%	0.00%	0.08%	100.00%
Male	2,777	133,233	229	100	2	1	3	135	136,480
Female	339	129,030	200	78	4	0	3	81	129,735
Gender ratio (% female)	10.9%	49.2%	46.6%	43.8%	66.7%	0.0%	50.0%	37.5%	48.7%
Sex ratio (no. of females per 1,000 males)	122	968	–	–	–	–	–	–	951
Urban	2,146	14,060	67	56	2	0	0	29	16,360
Rural	970	248,203	362	122	4	1	6	187	249,855
% Urban	68.9%	5.4%	15.6%	31.5%	33.3%	0.0%	0.0%	13.4%	6.1%

Languages of Shopian district (2011)
1. Kashmiri (88.0%)
2. Gojri (8.80%)
3. Pahari (1.78%)
4. Others (1.43%)

At the time of the 2011 census, 87.99% of the population spoke Kashmiri, 8.80% Gojri and 1.78% Pahari as their first language.

== Education ==
In 1988, The Government of Jammu and Kashmir established a college namely Government Degree College, Shopian which provides higher education infrastructure to the people of Shopian district. The Government Polytechnic college was established recently in the Shopian town, which provides technical engineering diploma level education.

Some of the other notable educational institutions are:

- Jamia Sirajul Uloom Imam Sahab, Shopian
- Jawahar Navodaya Vidyalaya, Shopian
- Government higher secondary, Shopian
- And also various private higher secondary and high schools

== Economy ==
The local economy depends on agriculture. Apple growing "provides employment to about 60% of the population and is the main source of livelihood of many households." Apple growing is more profitable than other crops, partly because the hilly nature of the land makes it harder to cultivate other crops than apples. The apple orchards in District Shopian cover an extensive area of 26,231 hectares, establishing it as the second-largest apple producer in the region after district Anantnag, which holds the distinction of being the top apple producer with its vast apple orchards spanning 33,768 hectares. District Shopian produces around 3 to 3.5 lakh metric tonnes of apple annually.

=== Apple Cluster ===
To enhance apple production in Shopian district, the Union government has granted approval for an "Apple Cluster" under the Cluster Development Programme. The project aims to boost Shopian apple's competitiveness globally by focusing on three key areas: pre-production-production, post-harvest management and value addition, and logistics, marketing, and branding. The estimated cost of the project is Rs 135.23 crore, with the Ministry providing around Rs 37.05 crore as grant-in-aid.

== Healthcare ==
The district has a number of hospitals and healthcare facilities, some of which include its adjoining areas they are:

- Government District Hospital Shopian
- Sub District Hospital Zainapora,
- Sub District Hospital Keller
- NTPHC Wachi
- Primary Health centre Aglar
- NTPHC Ramnagri
- PHC Herman
- PHC Pinjura
- PHC DK Pora

== Places of interest ==
Shopian district has many places with tourism potential: Arshi Pora Lahanthour, Sedow, Hirpora Wildlife Sanctuary, Dubijan - 6 km (3.7 mi) from Heerpora Village; Peer Marg/Peer Gali - 20 km (12 mi) away from Heerpora on the historical Mughal Road; Lake Nandansar - 2 km (1.2 mi) away from the Peer Ki Gali; Hash Wang Bagam Pather, Sok Saray, and Mughal Saray at Jajinar. The Jamia Masjid in Shopian is one of the famous historical monuments built during the Mughal reign resembling that of jamia Masjid Srinagar. The Aasar-i-Sharief Dargah at Pinjura, attracts thousands of devotees on the occasion of Eid-i-Milad-un- Nabi and Shab-i-Mehraj. Darul Uloom Islamia Pinjura where large people gather to seek (spiritual and moral) knowledge and propagate to others.Another famous muslim seminary called Jamia Sirajul Uloom is situated at Imamsahib.

On the outskirts of Shopian town near Nagbal area, there is a Siva temple called Kapalmochan Mandir with three natural springs and a unique Shivling with small Rudraksh shaped knots spread all over it.

== Transport ==
The major roads connecting Shopian with neighbouring districts are:

- Shopian-Pulwama-Srinagar Road
- Shopian-Anantnag Via Chitragam
- shopian to Aglar via heff turkuwangam
- Shopian -Anantnag via Kaider
- Shopian Anantnag Via Kulgam khudwani Wanpoh khanabal
- shopian to sangam via Aglar
- Shopian-Rajouri-Poonch via Mughal Road
- Shopian-Zawoora-Keller
- Shopian-Ganawpora-Berthipora-Kralcheck
- Shopian-Sedow-Aharbal
- Shopian-Hirpora
- Shopian-Bijbehara via Malik Gund Imamsahib,
- Shopian-Pinjoor
- Shopian-Zainapora( Babapora)- Frisal- khudwani
- Shopian-Zainapora( Babapora)- wachi - Sangam
- Shopian to Kulgam Kachdoora, Sehpora Mohan Pora or Okay
- Shopian to Reshnagri via Narwaw, Saidpora
- Shopian to Nehama via Vehil Nowgam, Kanjiullar
- Shopian to Ramnagri via Narwaw, Saidpora, Amshipora.
- Shopian to Kangiullar via Ramnagri and Gadiporahir
- Shopian to Kheer Bhawani at Mamzam via Ramnagri, Kanjiuller Nihama
- Shopian to Aharbal via Ramnagri, Gadipora and Nihama
- Shopian to Zawoora via Rambiara.
- Shopian to Shadab Karewa Via Zowoora.
- Shopian to Narapora, keller via Zawoora
- Shopain to Aharbal via Saidow
- Shopian Arshi pora road to link Via Herman Kadder Road
- Shopian to Manzimpara via Kundalan.
- Shopian to Anantnag via Manihall and Yaripora
- Shopian to Toolihalan
- Shopian to Aharbal via Ramnagri, Reshnagri, Bridge Completed in Last year.

.
