= Shopian =

Shopian Shupyan
- Town
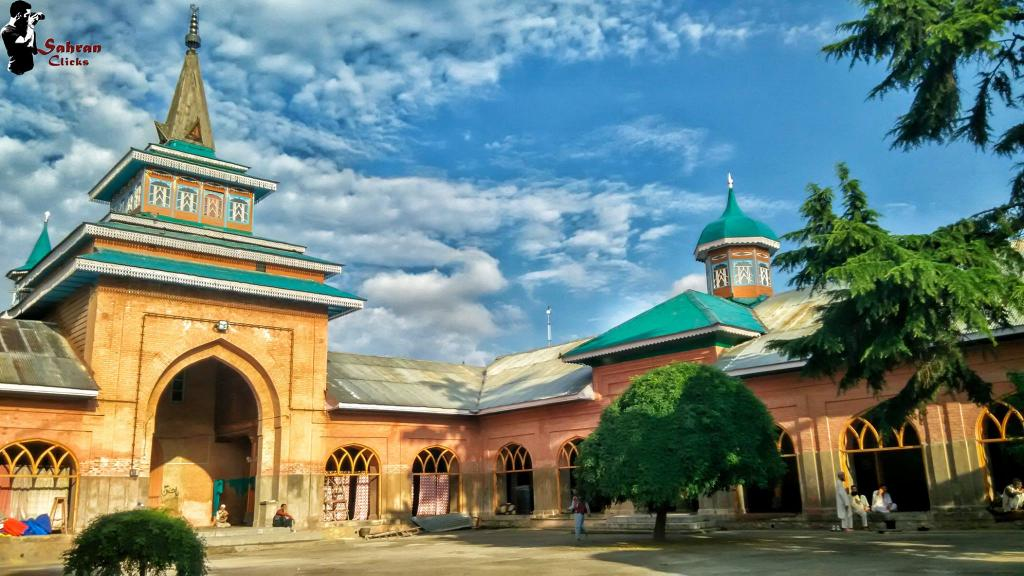
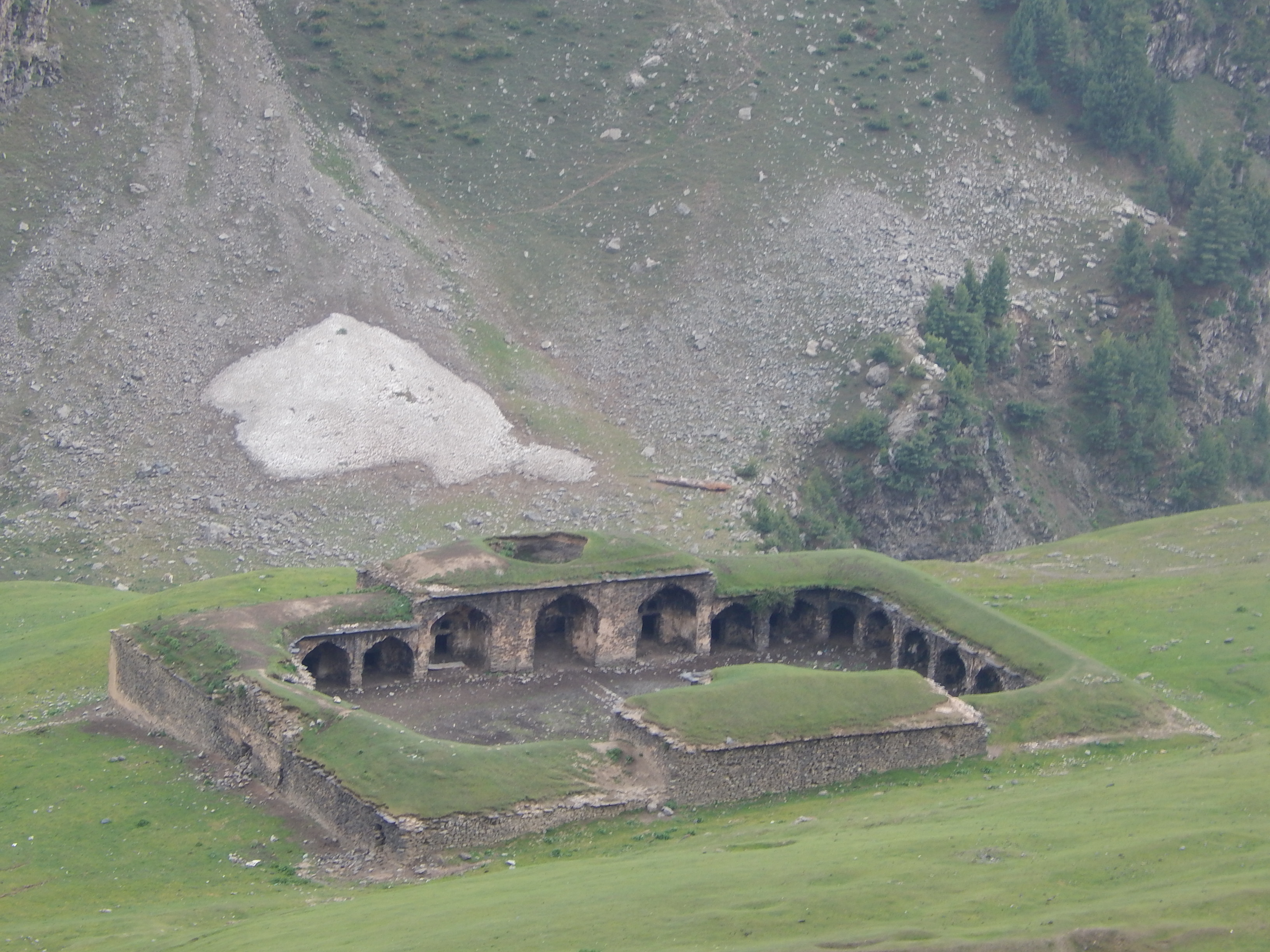
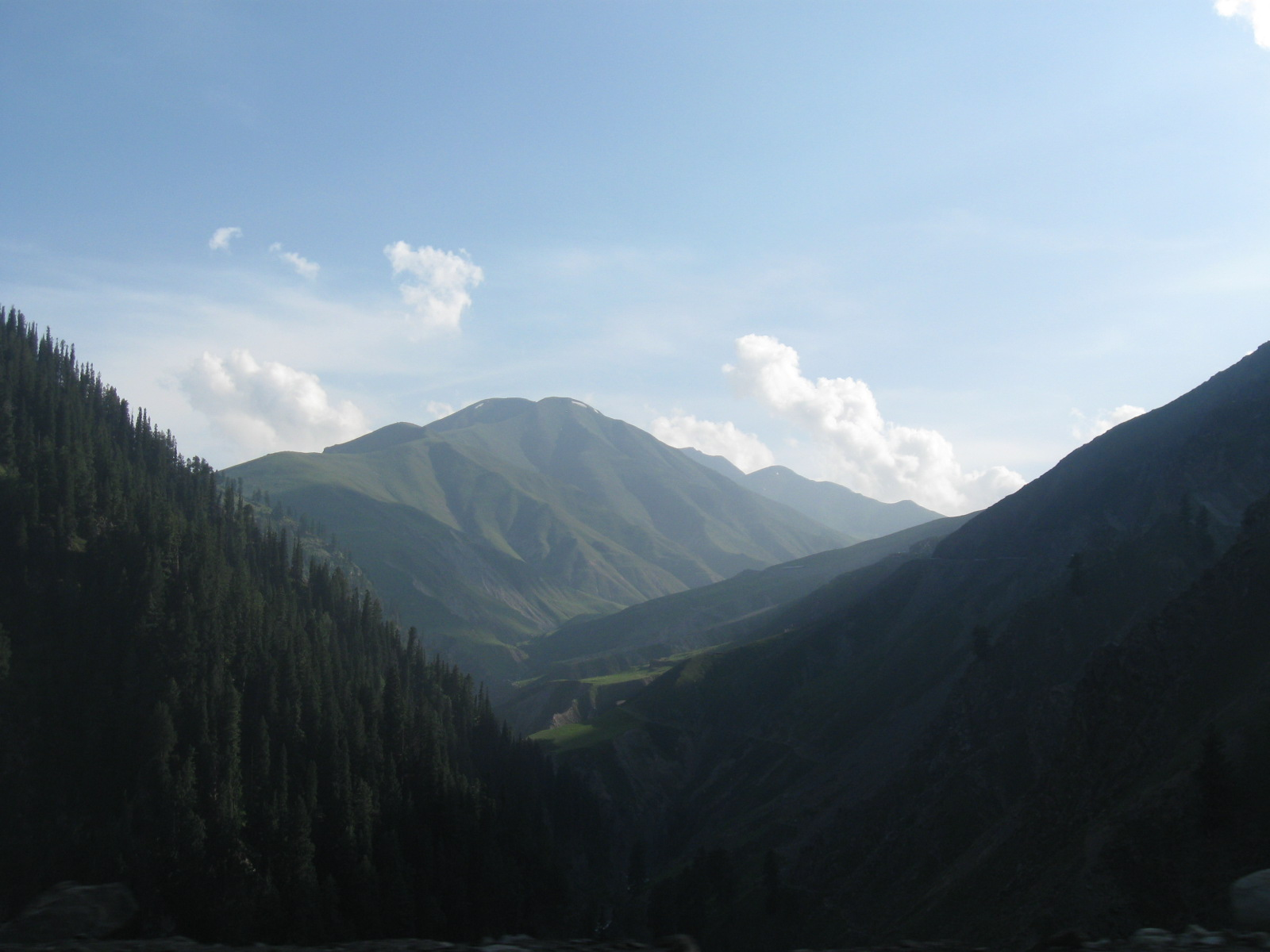
- From the top: Historical Jamia Masjid in Shopian, Historical Aliabad Sarai and Hirpora Wildlife Sanctuary

- Location in Jammu and Kashmir, India Shopian (India)
- Coordinates: 33°43′4.225″N 74°49′59.896″E
- Country: India
- Union territory: Jammu and Kashmir
- District: Shopian
- Established: 2007

Government
  - Type: District Magistrate - Presidential Rule

Area
  - Total: 312 km^{2} (120 sq mi)
- Elevation: 2,057 m (6,749 ft)

Population (2011)
  - Total: 266,215
  - Density: 853/km^{2} (2,210/sq mi)
- Demonym(s): Shopianites, Shopiani

Languages
  - Official: Kashmiri, Urdu, Hindi, Dogri, English

Demographics
  - Literacy rate: 78.6%
  - Sex ratio: 755.6 ♀/ 1000 ♂
- Time zone: UTC+5:30 (IST)
- PIN: 192303
- Area code: 01933
- Vehicle registration: JK22
- Website: shopian.nic.in

Shopian (Urdu pronunciation: [ʃoːpɪjɑ̃ː]), known as Shupyan (Kashmiri pronunciation: [ʃupʲjan]) in Kashmiri, is an administrative division of the Shopian district. It is located in the southern part of the Kashmir Valley in Jammu and Kashmir, India in the disputed Kashmir region.

Shopian is called the ''Apple town of Kashmir'' as the majority of the population engages in apple-growing practices. It also provides employment to more than 60% of the population. It is the second richest district in the Kashmir region after Srinagar.

== Etymology ==
The geologist Frederic Drew stated that Shopian derived its name from a distortion of word shah-payan, i.e. “royal stay”. However, the local people hold the view that Shopian was earlier named as “Shin-Van” meaning “snow forest”.

Shopian is an ancient town of Kashmir and had importance due to it being situated on the ancient imperial route, commonly known as Mughal Road, which connects Lahore and Srinagar. Shopian was one out of six Wazarat Headquarters in Kashmir from 1872 to 1892 A.D.

== History ==
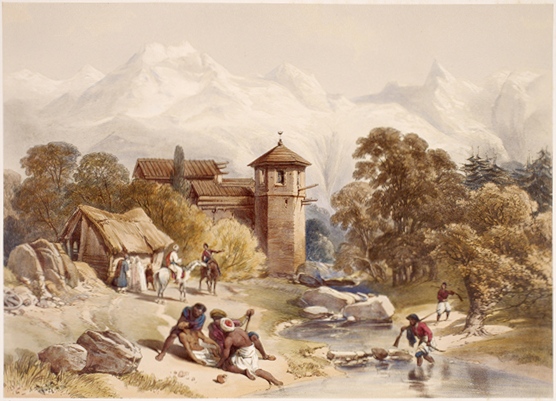
The Fort of Shupayan in 1846, as sketched by Charles Hardinge

The famous Battle of Shopian was fought in which Sikh forces defeated Afghan forces and captured Kashmir in 1819.

== Geography ==
Shupiyan is located at 33.72°N 74.83°E. It has an average elevation of 2,057 m (6,749 ft). It is 45 km (28 mi) from Srinagar.

== Demographics ==
Religion in Shopian City (2011)
1. Islam (95.9%)
2. Hinduism (3.12%)
3. Sikhism (0.34%)
4. Christianity (0.41%)
5. Buddhism (0.01%)
6. Jainism (0.00%)
7. Not Stated (0.18%)

As of 2011 India census, Shopian Municipal Committee had a population of 16,360. There were 9,319 males (57%) and 7,041 females (43%). Of the population, 2,063 (12.6%) were age 0-6: 1,146 males (56%) and 917 females (44%). The literacy rate for the people over six was 78.6% (males 86.7%, females 67.8%). The average population of the town was 6 persons each house.

Historical population
Year	Pop.	±% p.a.
1911	2,114	—
1921	2,236	+0.56%
1931	2,217	−0.09%
1941	4,359	+6.99%
1951	5,182	+1.74%
1961	6,005	+1.48%
1971	7,836	+2.70%
1981	9,653	+2.11%
2001	12,246	+1.20%
2011	16,360	+2.94%

== Education ==
In 1988, The Government of Jammu and Kashmir established a college namely Government Degree College, Shopian which provides higher education infrastructure to the people of Shopian district. The Government Polytechnic college was established recently in the Shopian town, which provides technical engineering diploma level education.

== Tourism ==
People from all around the globe visit the tourist places like Peer Ki Gali which is on a mountain top of Mughal road. Mughal Sarai - this palace is situated on the bank of river which flows on the side of Mughal road. This palace was used by Mughal rulers as their resting place during their travels. Dabjan forests - this place is another tourist place of Shopian, where a spring is present in the middle of Dabjan forest. Famous national park Hirpora Wildlife Sanctuary is situated in the district. The Hirpora Wildlife Sanctuary is an abode to many species of animals including the Himalayan brown bear, Himalayan black bear, musk deer, leopard, Tibetan wolf, Himalayan palm civet and also critically endangered Pir Panjal markhor. Besides, 130 species of birds including the spotted forktail, western tragopan, rock bunting, rufous-breasted accentor, Himalayan woodpecker, blue rock thrush, white-capped redstart, Himalayan griffon, common stonechat and grey wagtail are found in the Sanctuary.

== Economy ==
Shopian, located in the southern part of Jammu & Kashmir, has an economy predominantly based on agriculture, with apple cultivation as its mainstay. Often referred to as the "Apple Bowl of Kashmir," Shopian's fertile lands make it one of the top producers of apples in India. The district has seen a remarkable increase in apple production, with a 20% surge reported in recent years, contributing significantly to both the regional and national fruit markets.

The apple industry in Shopian is further boosted by government initiatives, such as the recently approved Rs 135 crore "Apple Cluster" project. This initiative, under the Cluster Development Programme, aims to enhance apple production, improve post-harvest management, and strengthen logistics, marketing, and branding of Shopian apples to make them globally competitive. The project is designed to be implemented over four years, with substantial funding from the Ministry of Agriculture and Farmers WelfareIn addition to apples, the district's economy also benefits from walnut cultivation and other horticultural activities. The region's topography, with its location in the foothills of the Pir Panjal Range, provides an ideal climate for these crops. Other sectors like sheep rearing, small-scale industries, and government schemes like the Jammu and Kashmir Rural Livelihoods Mission (JKRLM) also contribute to the local economy.

Shopian's strategic location along the historic Mughal Road has also made it a commercial hub for trade, linking it with the rest of Kashmir and northern India. However, the district's economic potential continues to face challenges related to infrastructure, political instability, and climatic conditions, which periodically affect productivity and livelihoods.
