= Basit Ahmed Dar =

Kashmiri separatist militant commander (2002–2024)

- Born: 12 April 2002; Redwani Payeen, Kulgam, Jammu and Kashmir, India
- Died: 7 May 2024 (aged 22); Kulgam, Jammu and Kashmir, India
- Other names: Abu Kamran
- Years active: 2021–2024
- Organization: The Resistance Front
- Predecessor: Muhammad Abbas Sheikh †
- Movement: Insurgency in Jammu and Kashmir

Basit Ahmed Dar (also known as Basit Dar or Abu Kamran Ali; 12 April 2002 – 7 May 2024) was a Kashmiri separatist militant commander. He was the Chief Operational Commander of The Resistance Front (TRF) following the assassination of TRF Commander Muhammad Abbas Sheikh in August 2021. He was one of the most wanted militants in the Kashmir valley with a reward of one million INR on his head. He was killed by Indian Security Forces on 7 May 2024, in an encounter in the Kulgam district of Kashmir.

== Early life ==
Basit Dar was born in Redwani Payeen Village, located in the Kulgam district of South Kashmir on 12 April 2002. The son of the late Abdul Rasheed Dar, Basit went missing on 25 April 2021; merely one month after his father's death, he joined The Resistance Front. In 2016, he faced injuries, enduring two bullets from Indian forces during the 2016 unrest following the killing of Burhan Wani. His educational journey extended till matriculation.

== The Resistance Front ==
After joining The Resistance Front, Basit Dar became a close associate of the then TRF commander, Abbas Sheikh. On orders of Abbas Sheikh he orchestrated numerous attacks in and around Srinagar city. Following Abbas Sheikh's killing in an encounter with Srinagar Police in August 2021, Basit Dar was subsequently chosen as the Chief Operational Commander by TRF supreme commander Sheikh Sajjad Gul. Thereafter, he orchestrated and executed hundreds of attacks targeting Indian security forces, migrant Pandits, non-Kashmiri labourers, local police informers, and pro-Indian politicians.

== Escape from encounters ==
Basit Dar escaped from encounters on multiple occasions. The first instance occurred on 24 November 2021, in Rambagh, Srinagar, where three of his associates were killed, including his close accomplice Mehran Yaseen Shalla. Another escape occurred on 23 March 2022, in Zoonimar, Srinagar, following the killing of a police officer. His last escape was on 15 August 2022 in the Nowhatta area of Srinagar after killing one policeman. He was then underground and leading TRF operations remotely, until he was killed.

== Designation and reward ==
On 10 December 2022, the Indian Central Government labelled him a wanted terrorist, and India's National Investigation Agency (NIA) offered a reward of 1 million INR for his capture. Security forces posted his wanted posters throughout the valley. He was the most wanted and feared militant in Jammu and Kashmir, wanted by Indian security forces in numerous cases at the time of his death.
