= Kelam, Kulgam =

Village in Jammu and Kashmir, India

Kelam Kulgam
- Model Village
- Kelam
- Location in Jammu and Kashmir, India Kelam Kulgam (India)
- Coordinates: 33.650000°N 75.083333°E
- Country: India
- State: Jammu and Kashmir
- District: Kulgam
- Tehsil: Devsar

Languages
  - Official: Kashmiri, Urdu, Hindi, Dogri, English

Kilam or (Kelam) is a village in Devsar Tehsil in the Kulgam district of Jammu and Kashmir. It is located 7 km (4.3 mi) north of the district headquarters, Kulgam and is 54 km (34 mi) from Srinagar, the summer capital of union territory of Jammu and Kashmir.

== Divisions ==
Kilam has two divisions namely Kilam A and Kilam B. The Kilam Mirbazar Road divides the village into two parts. Small part towards Gund and large portion in which Dangarpora and Herpora are located towards Agroo and Devsar.

Kilam-A is surrounded by Qaimoh tehsil towards east, Kulgam tehsil towards south, Anantnag tehsil towards east, Qazigund tehsil towards east. Kilam is surrounded by Zungalpora (west) Agroo, Zahipor and Koddar Hablish (east), Gund (north) villages and Devsar town (south).

== Education ==
Government Degree College, Kelam is a co-education college established in 2008.

== See also ==
- Zeipora
