= Waltangoo =

Waltengo Kund
- Village
- Waltengo
- Location in Jammu and Kashmir, India Waltengo Kund (India)
- Coordinates: 33.54770701°N 75.11244867°E
- Country: India
- State: Jammu and Kashmir
- District: Kulgam
- Tehsil: Devsar

Languages
  - Official: Kashmiri, Urdu, Hindi, Dogri, English

Waltengo is a village in Qazigund Block in Kulgam District of Jammu and Kashmir (union territory), India. It is located 12 km towards East from District headquarters Kulgam. 65 km from State capital Srinagar, Jammu This village is famous because of ziyarat shareef of Hazrat Syed Noor Shah wali Bagadai R.A

== 2005 Snowstorm ==
On 18 February 2005, A snow storm killed 175 people in Waltengo Nar in Kulgam district. Many villages are situated in the crest of the mountain ridges, making them vulnerable to snow storm and avalanches because of slopes protruding from two sides making wind to whirl and trigger avalanches.
