= Yamrach =

Village in Jammu and Kashmir, India

- Village
- Yamrach Yaripora
- Location in Jammu and Kashmir, India Yamrach (India)
- Coordinates: 33°43′51″N 74°59′44″E
- Country: India
- Union Territory: Jammu and Kashmir
- District: Kulgam

Population (2011)
  - Total: 2,000

Languages
  - Official: Kashmiri, Urdu, English
- Time zone: UTC+5:30 (IST)
- Area code: 192232

Yamrach is a village in Kulgam district of Jammu and Kashmir. It is located at 13 km from Kulgam.

== Demographics ==
According to the 2011 census, it has a population of 2000 of which 1100 are male and 900 are female. The whole population practices Islam. Kashmiri, Urdu, English, Arabic and Hindi are spoken there.

== Geography ==
This village is bordered by Katapora to the east, Hangulbuch to the northeast, Hatipora and Tungdonu to the north, Hanger to the west, Dasen to the south and Khanpora to the southeast. The road through Yamrach connects Yaripora with Hanger.

== Education ==
Four schools are there:

- Shinning Public School
- Hanfia Middle School
- Govt. Middle School
- Govt.SSA School

== Healthcare ==
The health facility is Sub Centre Yamrach.

== See also ==
- Yaripora
