= 2026 Kulgam attack =

2026 Attack part of Insurgency in Jammu and Kashmir

- Part of Insurgency in Jammu and Kashmir
Date	11 November 2026
Location	CRPF's 46th Battalion, Akhran, Kulgam district, Jammu and Kashmir, India
Result	2 terrorists were killed in the subsequent encounter; Mohammad Lateef Bhat and Umar Nisar Dar

Belligerents
- Lashkar-e-Taiba

Strength
- 2 terrorists

On 11 November 2026, Lashkar-e-Taiba (LeT) carried out an attack on a checkpoint of the Central Reserve Police Force in the Akhran region of Kulgam district, injuring three paramilitary personnel where one of them is in critical condition. Police attributed the attack to Mohammad Lateef Bhat, a local commander of the LeT and its offshoot The Resistance Front (TRF). He was already wanted over two killings in July 2026.

The attack set off a week-long manhunt across Kulgam, and on 16 November an associate of Bhat, Umar Nisar Dar was killed in a gunfight near the Laroo Bypass. Bhat was also wounded but he managed to escape. On 18 November he was killed after he took shelter in a mosque in Zangalpora, in the Devsar area, and refused to surrender. Indian officials describe him as the last known active local militant in the Kashmir Valley.

== Background ==
After Operation Sindoor, militant violence in the Kashmir Valley fell sharply. Security agencies reported a steep drop in local recruitment, and the first half of 2026 saw relatively few violent incidents. By the second half of 2026 the figure had fallen to one, while an estimated 40 to 50 foreign militants were still thought to be operating in the region.

On July 2026, a head police constable, Ashiq Hussain was shot dead in Anantnag in what was the first reported militant attack in Kashmir since the 2025 Pahalgam attack. On the evening of 31 July, gunmen opened fire on two non-local labourers at a brick kiln in Kelam (Kilam or Kellam) village in Kulgam district. Both of the victims later died of their injuries. The Chhattisgarh government named them as Deepak Ratre and Bhupendra Bhaina, and announced Rs 20 lakh in compensation for each family. Jammu and Kashmir Deputy Chief Minister Surinder Choudhary questioned the central government's account of the security situation in the Union Territory and demanded a high-level probe.

Investigators linked both July attacks to Mohammad Lateef Bhat, a young Kulgam resident who joined The Resistance Front, a Lashkar-e-Taiba proxy. He was recruited by Pakistan-based designated terrorist Sajjad Gul. In July 2026 he escaped a five-day encounter in Shopian in which another militant, Zakir Ganie was killed. Jammu and Kashmir Police later offered a reward of Rs 15 lakh for information leading to him.

== Attack ==
On 11 November 2026, at about 2:15 PM, two armed men on a motorcycle opened fire on personnel of the CRPF’s 46th Battalion, manning a checkpoint at Akhran, near Mir Bazar in Kulgam district. Three personnel were wounded, where one of them was critically injured with gunshot wounds to the abdomen and spine. The attack occurred when Lieutenant Governor of Jammu and Kashmir Manoj Sinha was attending an event in Kulgam district.

In a statement dated 11 November, a previously unknown group that called itself Pasdaran-e-Hurriyat Kashmir claimed responsibility for the attack. However, police suspected Bhat of planning the attack and believed he had been accompanied by Pakistan LeT operatives. Officials later said that Bhat and his associate Umar Nisar Dar had carried it out together after scouting the area beforehand. About a day after the Kulgam attack, two Special Police Officers were abducted and killed in Kishtwar district, in the Jammu region.

== Counter-operations ==
Security forces cordoned off the area and began searching for the attackers. In the following days, security forces set up barricades, checked vehicles and frisked residents. Several villages were placed under restrictions for an extended period.

=== Laroo bypass encounter ===
After a six-day search, a joint team of the Jammu and Kashmir Police, the Indian Army and the CRPF launched a cordon-and-search operation near the Laroo bypass in Kulgam, based on intelligence inputs. According to one account, forces first spent about 90 minutes evacuating residents before the operation began.

In the gunfight, Umar Nisar Dar was killed. Officials said Dar, a former bread-maker whose family had reported him missing had joined TRF only about a week before his death. They added that Dar had sheltered Bhat for nearly six months.

=== Zangalpora encounter ===
Early on 18 November, shortly before morning prayers, security forces acting on specific intelligence developed by the Jammu and Kashmir Police cordoned off Zangalpora village in the Devsar area of Kulgam. Bhat had taken shelter inside a mosque. He was repeatedly asked to surrender but he refused. Videos of security personnel appealing to him to lay down his arms was widely shared on social media. Officials said militants opened fire as forces approached, and he was killed in the exchange that followed. The Army's Chinar Corps said he was forced out of the mosque before being killed.

Kulgam's Senior Superintendent of Police, Anayat Ali Chowdhary, said forces had exercised maximum restraint to avoid damaging the mosque. It was reported that the mosque did not suffer any damage. Kashmir Zone Police said Bhat's body and a weapon were recovered. Searches of the area were still continuing when the first reports were filed.

== Reactions ==
After Bhat's death, Union Minister Amit Shah called him LeT's "last known active local terrorist in the valley". CRPF Director General G. P. Singh posted a message congratulating the forces, saying "some dishes are best served cold, even in cold weather".

== See also ==
- 2006 Kulgam massacre
- 2019 Kulgam massacre
