= Zeipora =

Village in Jammu and Kashmir, India

Zeipora Devsar
- Village
- Zeipora
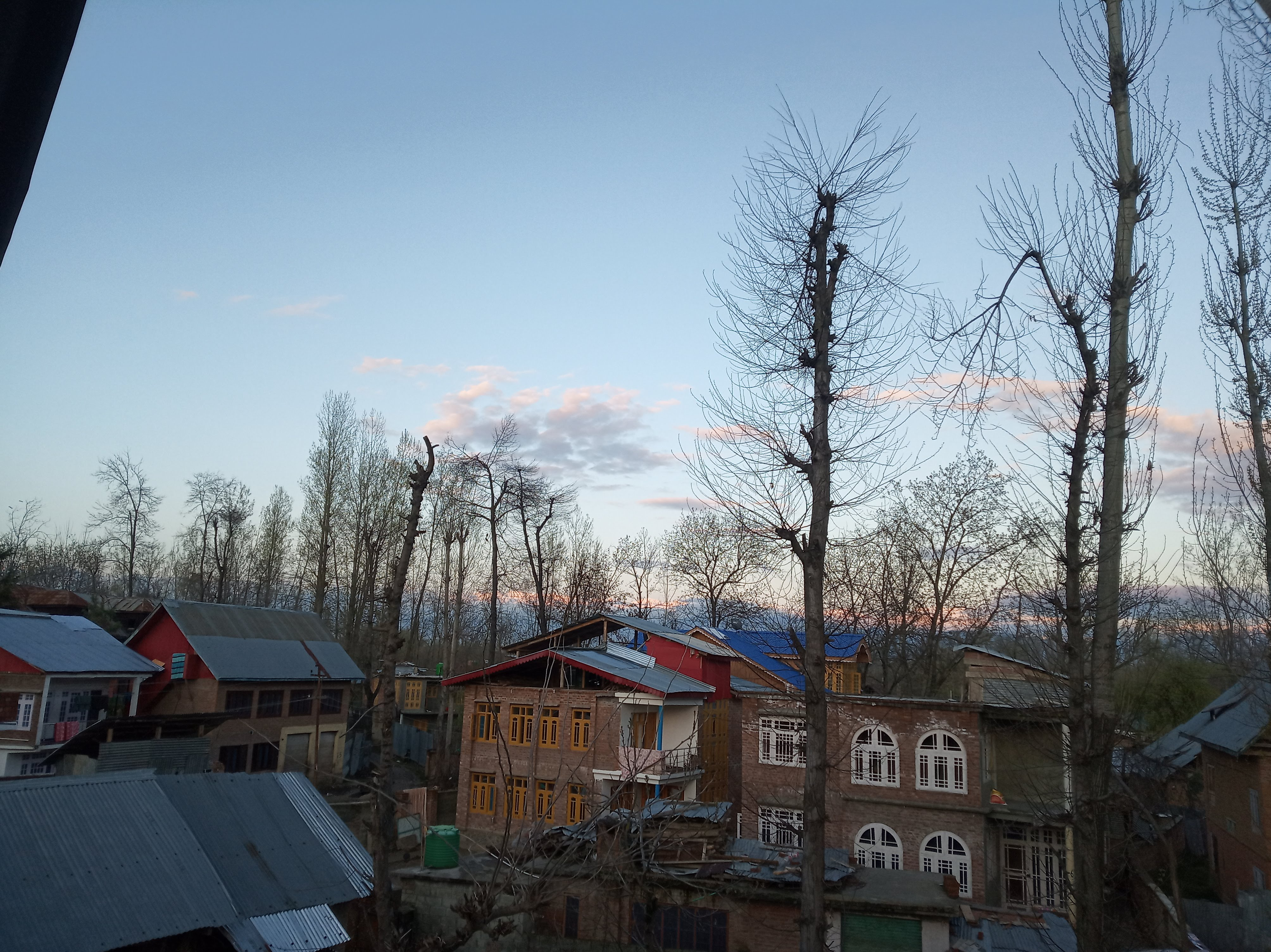
- Aerial view of Zeipora village
- Country: India
- State: Jammu and Kashmir
- District: Kulgam
- Tehsil: Devsar

Languages
  - Official: Kashmiri, Urdu, Hindi, Dogri, English

Zeipora is a village located in Devsar tehsil of Kulgam district in Jammu and Kashmir, India. It is situated 6 kilometres (3.7 mi) away from Devsar and 8 kilometres (5.0 mi) away from the district headquarters of Kulgam.

== Demographics ==
According to the 2011 census, the census ode of Zeipora Devsar village is 004055. It has a population of 656, with 343 men and 313 women.

== Shrine ==
Located in the village is a shrine dedicated to Haji baba, as well as a sign tree of Hazrat simnania. There is an active, youth-led foundation in the village known as Simnania Youth Foundation, which is affiliated with Tehreek-e-Soutul Awliya.
