= Damhal Hanji Pora =

Damhal Hanji Pora Damhal Heanzpur
- Town
- Location in Jammu and Kashmir, India Damhal Hanji Pora (India)
- Coordinates: 33.65°N 75.02°E
- Country: India
- Union territory: Jammu and Kashmir
- District: Kulgam
- Elevation: 1,668 m (5,472 ft)

Languages
  - Official: Kashmiri, Urdu, Hindi, Dogri, English
- Time zone: UTC+5:30 (IST)
- PIN: 192233
- Telephone code: 01933
- Vehicle registration: JK-18
- Sex ratio: ♂/♀
- Website: kulgam.gov.in

Damhal Hanji Pora, also known as D. H. Pora, is a town and a notified area committee in Kulgam district of the Indian union territory of Jammu and Kashmir. It is one of the seven administrative blocks of the Kulgam district.

== Geography ==
The area is located 14 km (8.7 mi) towards south-west from district headquarters in Kulgam at an elevation of 1,668 m (5,472 ft) above mean sea level in Mumbai. The area is bordered by Bufliaz tehsil towards west, Thana Mandi tehsil towards west, Darhal tehsil towards south and Shopian tehsil towards east.

== See also ==
- Aharbal
