= Frisal =

- City
- Location in Jammu and Kashmir, India Frisal (India)
- Coordinates: 33.86°N 75.27°E
- Country: India
- State: Jammu and Kashmir
- District: Kulgam
- Elevation: 1,600 m (5,200 ft)

Population (2011)
  - Total: 5,132

Languages
  - Official: Kashmiri, Urdu, Hindi, Dogri, English
- Time zone: UTC+5:30 (IST)

Frisal is a tehsil and CD block in the district of Kulgam, Jammu and Kashmir, India. It is 14 km from District Headquarters Kulgam and 6 km from NH44 Bijbehara (Jablipora Fruit mandi, Emergency Runway Junction), situated on Bijbehara, Arwani-Frisal-Kulgam road. Its boundaries connect three districts of South Kashmir (Anantnag, Kulgam, and Shopian). Frisal is the second largest town in Kulgam.

== Economy ==
The main sources of income of this tehsil are agriculture, horticulture, business, and government. Frisal is average economically and educationally.

Tehsil offices include the Block office, JK Bank, Punjab National Bank, social welfare office, and Model Hospital, Modal Higher Secondary, Degree college and police station

== Education ==
The town offers one Govt. Degree college, one higher secondary school, five high schools and several lower educational institutions.

== Geography ==
Many springs in Frisal lead it to be known as a town of springs.

== Demographics ==
As of 2011 India census, Frisal had a population of 5,132. The population later grew to over 8000.

Religion in Frisal
Religion	Percent
Islam	99.18%
Hinduism	0.53%
