= Kausar Nag =

Lake in Jammu and Kashmir, India

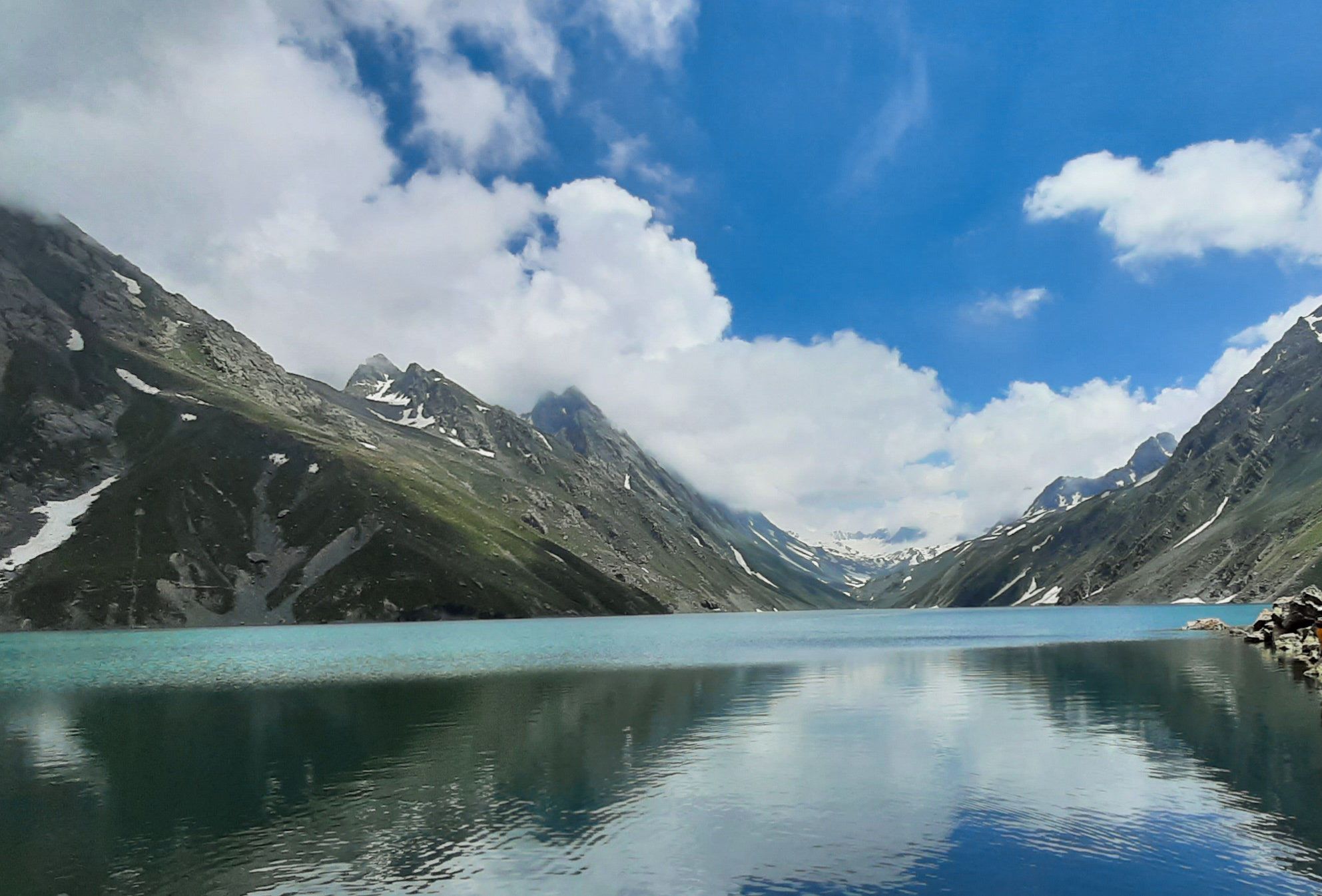
- Kausar Nag Lake in August

- Location in Jammu and Kashmir, India
- Location: Kulgam, Kashmir valley, India
- Coordinates: 33°30′44″N 74°46′08″E
- Type: Oligotrophic lake
- Primary inflows: Melting of snow
- Primary outflows: Veshaw River
- Max. length: 1.5 kilometres (0.93 mi)
- Max. width: 0.9 kilometres (0.56 mi)
- Surface elevation: 3,500 metres (11,500 ft)
- Frozen: November to July

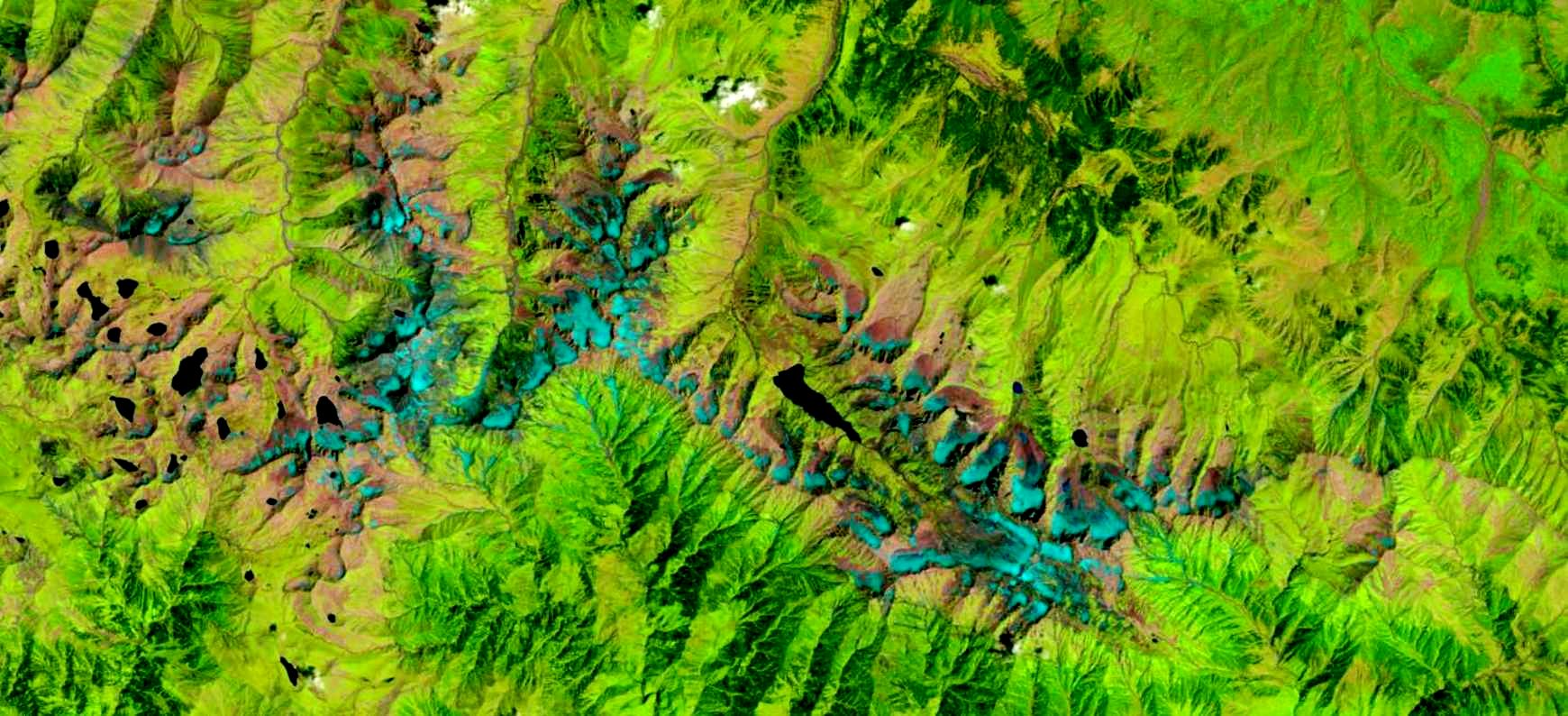
A satellite image showing Kausar Nag (centre)

Kausar Nag, also called Konsarnag and Kramasaras, is a high-altitude oligotrophic lake located at an elevation of 3,500 metres (11,500 ft) above sea level. Kausar Nag is located in the Pir Panjal mountain range in Kulgam district of Jammu and Kashmir, India. The lake is roughly 3 km (2 mi) long and .75 km (0 mi) at the widest point. The lake is the primary source of the Veshaw River, a tributary of Jhelum. This lake is considered sacred in Hinduism for its association with Hindu deity Vishnu, and Hindus perform pilgrimage (yatra) to it.

== Etymology and names ==
The lake was originally known as Kramasaras in Sanskrit.

== Legends ==
According to the Nilamata Purana, after the great flood, the boat of Manu that carried the Vedas and the Saptarishi was stuck in the mountains above the lake. According to another belief, the lake was created by Vishnu by stamping with his foot, and thus it is also referred to as Vishnu Pad. Sultan Zain ul Abedin is said to have visited the lake, as a symbolic gesture to persuade the exiled Hindus of Kashmir to return. Visits to the lake by Hindus for ablution were also recorded in the late 1830s.

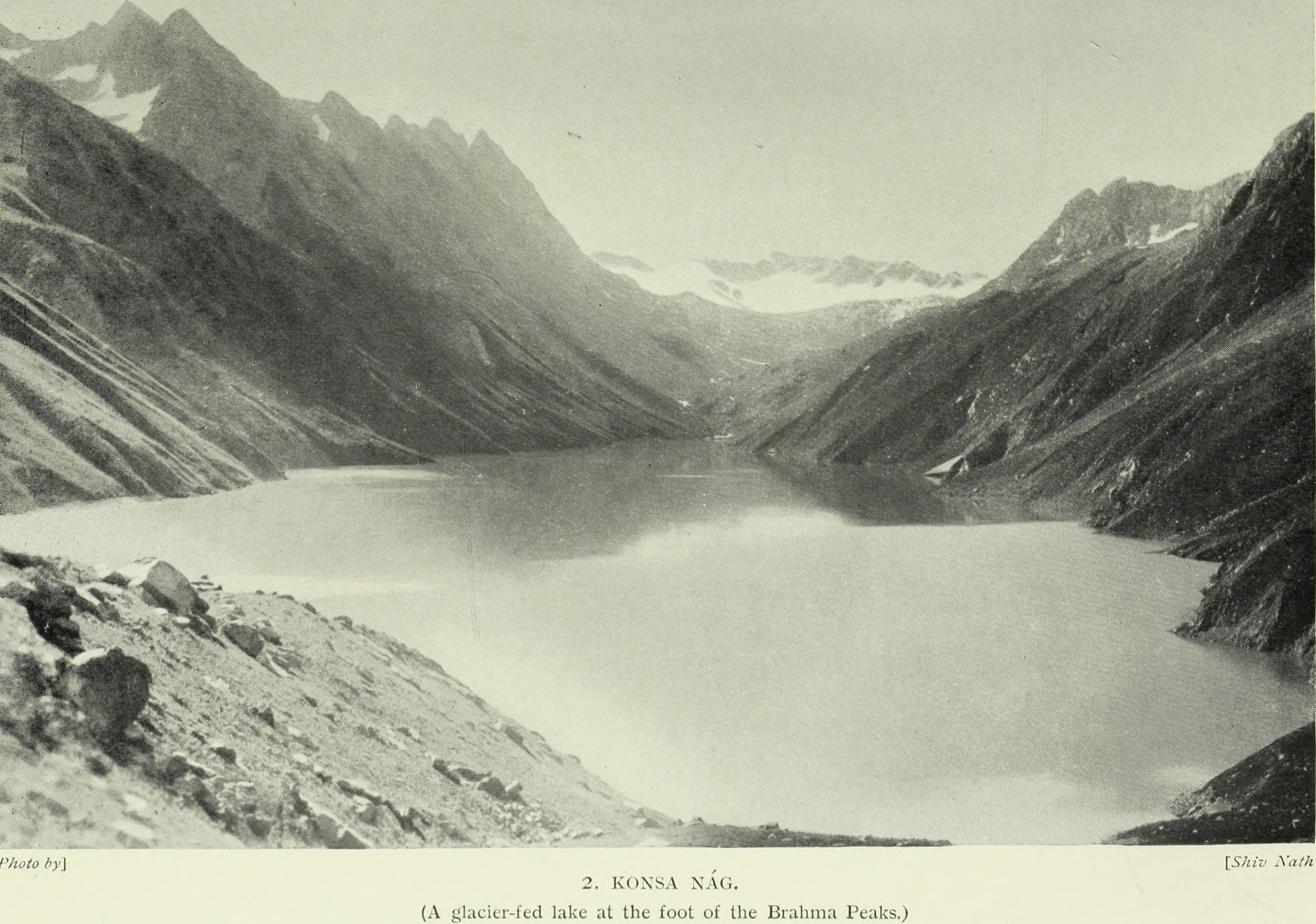
Konsar Nag Lake, c. 1910s

=== Yatra ===
There are two routes traditionally used for Hindu pilgrimages (called yatra) to the lake, one through Kulgam in the Kashmir Valley and the other via Reasi in the Jammu region. The Kashmir Valley route, used by Kashmiri Pandits, was abandoned during the 1990s militancy in the region. Plans to revive this route in 2014 failed after stiff opposition and protests from separatists. The Reasi route continues to be used for the pilgrimage.

== Access ==
The Kausar Nag Lake is accessible during the summer and can be reached from its trail-head Aharbal, by a 36 km hiking trail. Aharbal is connected with Srinagar, a 70 km motorable road passing through the towns of Shopian and Pulwama. The lake can also be reached through a tougher alternate trail from the south, primarily used by pilgrims.

== See also ==
- Chiranbal
- Aharbal
- Mughal Road
- Gangabal
- Hirpora Wildlife Sanctuary
- Kulgam district
