= Akhran =

Akhran Kulgam
- Village
- Akhran
- Location in Jammu and Kashmir, India Akhran Kulgam (India)
- Coordinates: 33.678238°N 75.110468°E
- Country: India
- State: Jammu and Kashmir
- District: Kulgam
- Tehsil: Devsar

Languages
  - Official: Kashmiri, Urdu, Hindi, Dogri, English

Akhran is a village and Panchayat halqa in Devsar tehsil in the Kulgam district of Jammu and Kashmir. According to the 2011 census, the total population of the village was 2,615. Village has a Government high school, a government middle school, an incomplete primary health center, a private middle school. It is close to NH-44. There is also a temporary army camp. The mirbazar-kulgam road runs through the village. It is 1 mile from Mirbazar(NH-44).
