= Rambi Ara =

River and tributary of Jhelum River in Jammu and Kashmir, India

Rambi Ara رٲمبؠ آرٕ
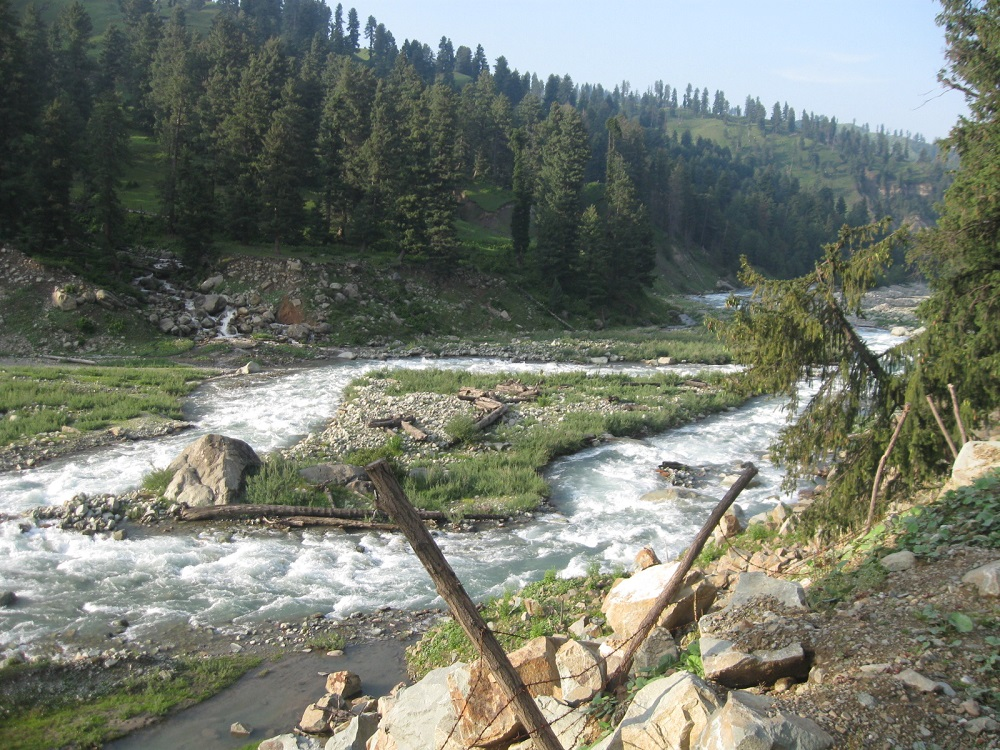

Location
- Country: India
- State: Jammu and Kashmir
- Region: Kashmir Valley
- District: Shopian

Physical characteristics
- Source: confluence of two streams, "RUPRI NAR" and "YANGA NAR", rising in high altitude lakes and snow covered peaks and glaciers in the rupri ridge of the PIR PANJAL & NABA PIR PASS.
- Mouth: 33.818°N 75.066°E
  - location: Confluence with Veshaw River near Sangam

Basin features
- Tributaries
  - right: Veshaw River

Rambi Ara is a river and tributary to the River Jhelum located in Shopian District in the union territory of Jammu and Kashmir.

It joins the Veshaw River near Sangam in Anantnag District before the confluence finally meets the Jhelum. The Rambi Ara originates in the Pir Panjal Range and has two major tributaries. The Rambi Ara is known for fluctuating water levels and is often affected by flash floods.
