= Qaimoh =

Qaimoh Qaimoh Block
- Town
- Location in Jammu and Kashmir, India Qaimoh (India)
- Coordinates: 33.70°N 75.10°E
- Country: India
- State: Jammu and Kashmir
- District: Kulgam
- Founder: Sheikh ul Aalam
- Elevation: 1,700 m (5,600 ft)

Languages
  - Official: Kashmiri, Urdu, Hindi, Dogri, English
- Time zone: UTC+5:30 (IST)
- Postal code: 192102

Qaimoh (also known as Quaimoh, Kaimoh or Kah moh) is a block, a town and a notified area committee in Kulgam District in the union territory of Jammu and Kashmir, India. It is four miles to the west of Anantnag and six miles to the north of Kulgam District. It is 55 km to the south of Srinagar city. Qaimoh is one of the largest blocks in Jammu and Kashmir.

== Demographics ==
According to 2011 Census of India, the city is the home of 13,138 individuals, which further divides into 6,681 males and 6,457 females.

== Geography ==
The area is located at an elevation of 1568 m above mean sea level. Qaimoh is situated on the bank of River Veshaw which has its origin from the lake of Kousar Nag some 25 kilometers away from the waterfall of Aharabal.

== Transport ==
Anantnag railway station is the nearby railway station 3.9 km from the area

== Shrine ==
There is a shrine of Sheikh-Ul-Alam, who was born and spent most of his life in Qaimoh and was buried in Chari Sharief.

== Trade and business ==
Most of the population is agriculture and horticulture dependent. Qaimoh is also known for exporting and importing of horticultural plants like apples, peaches, pears, apricot, plum etc to and from Himachal Pradesh. People from this block are well known for their business skills. However, the literacy rate is little low (66%)[76% male and 57% female]. Qaimoh is a place where a lot of fresh as well as dry fruits are grown. The soil is said to be very fertile in this part of the valley but the place always has a threat of floods. River Vishew flows through the village and has damaged the crops of the village many a time.
