= Government Degree College, Kelam =

College in Kulgam, Jammu and Kashmir, India

Government Degree College Kilam
- Altaf Memorial Degree College Kilam Kulgam
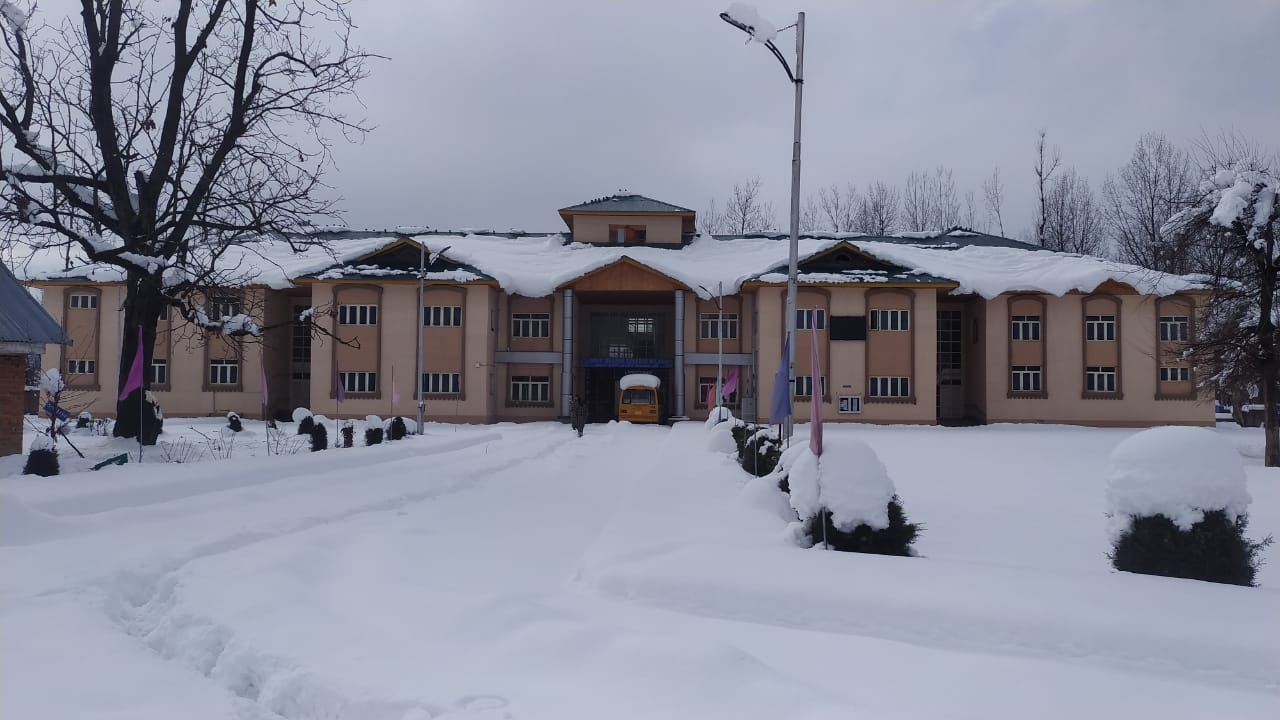
- Type: Degree college
- Established: 2008 (18 years ago)
- Academic affiliations: University of Kashmir
- Location: Kelam, Kulgam, Jammu and Kashmir, India; 33.651°N 75.080°E
- Campus: Rural
- Language: Urdu and English
- Website: amgdckilam.edu.in

The Government Degree College, Kelam (also known as GDC Kelam or Inspector Shri Muhammad Altaf Dar Degree College) is a co-education college located in Kelam, Kulgam in the Indian union territory of Jammu and Kashmir. The college was established in 2008 and is affiliated with Kashmir University. The college is recognized by University Grants Commission.

== Location ==
Government Degree College Kilam is located in Kilam, distance of about 7.2 km (4.5 mi) from Kulgam town.

== Courses offered ==
The college offers Arts and Science streams.
