= Khull (Noor-abad) =

Village in Jammu and Kashmir, India

Khull (Noor-abad) is a village in the Noor-abad constituency of Kulgam district of Jammu and Kashmir . It is about 85 kilometres (53 mi) from Srinagar.

The full name of Khull is Qasba Khull (Noorabad). It is known for its education.

== Education ==
More than 19 schools along with a religious institute operate there:

- Govt Higher Secondary school Qasba khull noorabad
- Hanfia Noorani public high school khull
- Govt High School qasba khull
- Gousia Little angels school Qasba khull
- Govt Girls High school qasba khull
- Govt Middle school bungam khull
- Govt Middle school Putpora bungam
- New Radiant Public School Qasba khull noorabad
- Green Valley School qasba khull noorabad
- Govt Middle School Ringth qasba khull noorabad
- Govt Middle school gujar basti khull
- Govt Middle school Baba pora
- Govt Middle school Lateef bagh khull
- Darul uloom Ishatul Quran wa Sunnah Ardpora

Two sports stadiums are located nearby – MNDLS Stadium qasba Khull noorabad near Ardpora, and Ringat qasba khull playground.
