= Nasirabad Kulgam =

Village in Jammu and Kashmir, India

Nasirabad Kulgam is a village in the Kulgam district of Jammu and Kashmir. All the population belong to the Ahmadiyya Muslim Community. The main source of income is employment, agriculture and to some extent the crafts. According to recent census reports the total population of the village is about 2000, which includes 1220 males.

There are 5 schools in this village which provide education to about 2000 students annually. There are 4 mosques and 2 graveyards in this village.
