= Yaripora =

Yaripora Yaripur
- Town
- Yaripora Kulgam
- Location in Jammu and Kashmir, India
- Coordinates: 33.7°N 75.0°E
- Country: India
- State: Jammu and Kashmir
- District: Kulgam

Government
  - Type: Municipal committee
  - Body: Urban Local Bodies

Area
  - Total: 8.21 km^{2} (3.17 sq mi)
  - Rank: Second biggest city by area in Kulgam

Population (2011)
  - Total: 12,123
  - Density: 1,480/km^{2} (3,820/sq mi)

Languages
  - Official: Kashmiri, Urdu, Hindi, Dogri, English
- Time zone: UTC+5:30 (IST)
- PIN Code: 192232
- Area code: +91
- Distance from Kulgam: 12.8 kilometres (8.0 mi)
- Distance from Srinagar: 53 kilometres (33 mi)

Yaripora or Yaripur is the second largest town by area and fourth least populous area of Kulgam district located in the union territory of Jammu and Kashmir in India. Its headquarters are located in Kulgam which is 12.8 km (8.0 mi) away from the main town of Yaripora. Most of its area is situated on the banks of rivulet Sonamann, a tributary of Veshaw that in turn joins the Jehlum at Sangam which comes under the Pir Panjal Range. Yaripora town has two electoral wards, with a population of 12,123, of which 6,043 are males and 6,080 are females, reported by the 2011 Census of India.

Surrounded by an L Shaped Karewa Yaripora as a habitable site appears to have been established somewhere around the 17th century AD as a central trading place with a cluster of villages connected by half a dozen roads coming from different directions. With multiple springs and a few fresh water streams flowing directly through the village the local population seems to have thrived as a tiny trading hub. People of the village belong to two ethnic groups one Kashmiri and the other Bombas, the later settling in the village in the fifties of the 18th century. Bombas speak Pahari Pothohari.Bomba (Tribe). Raja Sher Ahmad Khan was the last ruler of the Bomba tribe whose ancestors had founded the town of Muzaffarabad. He had fought the Khalsa state when it annexed Kashmir in 1818 and later on assisted the Khalsa governor of Kashmir against the Ghulab Singh family in 1846 but finally submitted when the former was actively supported by the British overlords. He along with his family was forced to leave Karnah and settle in Yaripora in the year 1856. He had sought to be allowed to be buried after his death at Karnah but neither he nor his family was allowed the wish by the rulers. He is buried within the shrine of Gaebi Shah Sahib located within the courtyard of the Jamia Masjid Yaripora.

== Road facility ==
Yaripora has following roads connecting it to many towns segments and other districts.

- Bijbehara-Arwani-Frisal-Yaripora Road
- Kulgam-Laroo-Bugam-Yaripora Road
- Behibag-Kadder-Noonmai-Yaripora Road
- Shopian-Chitragam-Reban Yaripora Road
- Anantnag-Wanpoh-Qaimoh-Balsoo-Yaripora Road

== Schools in Yaripora Block ==
Yaripora is a block in the Kulgam district of Jammu And Kashmir which contains about eight clusters. The government and private schools of Yaripora block are divided into different clusters of the schools. There is a separate higher secondary schools for both girls and boys respectively and a number of other private and government institutions.

=== Ms hangelbuch ===
1. GMS FRISAL Cluster
2. HS BEHI BAGH Cluster
3. M/S TENGBAL Cluster
4. MS PARI GAM Cluster
5. MS SONIGAM Cluster
6. TUNGDANOO Cluster
7. MS YAMRACH Cluster
8. MS YARI PORA Cluster
