= Eemu, Kulgam =

Village in Jammu and Kashmir, India

Eemu is a village of South Kashmir's Kulgam district of Jammu and Kashmir.
