= Mohammed Sheikh (disambiguation) =

Mohammed Sheikh may refer to:

- Mohammed Sheikh (born 1973), English cricketer
- Mohamed Sheikh, Baron Sheikh (1941–2022), British politician and businessman
- Mohammad Sheikh (born 1980), Kenyan cricketer
- Muhammad Abbas Sheikh (died 2021), militant from the Hizbul Mujahideen and The Resistance Front; active in Jammu and Kashmir, India
