= Veshaw River =

River in Kulgam, J&K

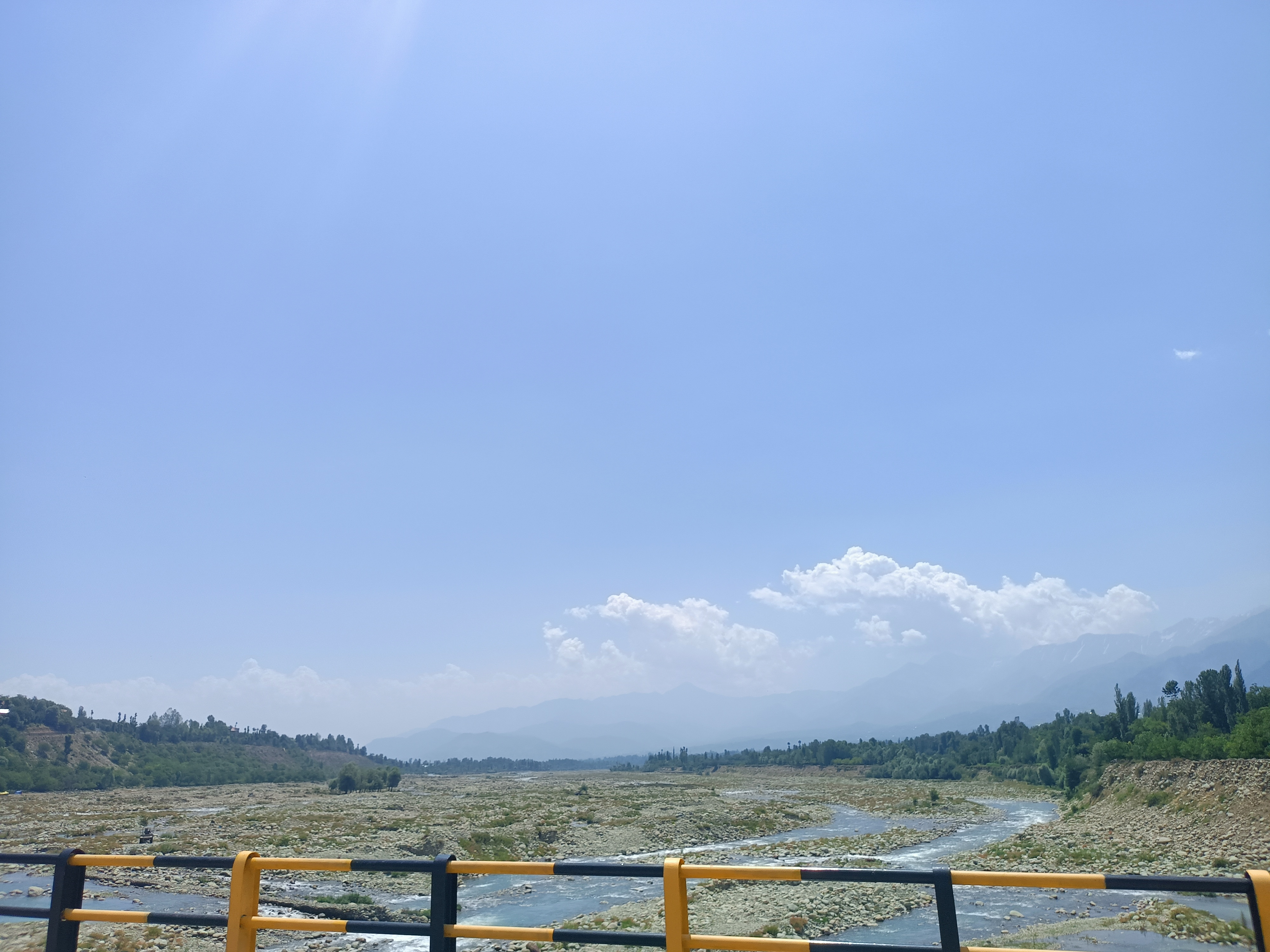

Location
- Country: India
- State: Jammu and Kashmir
- Region: Kashmir Valley
- District: Kulgam

Physical characteristics
- Source: 33.512287°N 74.768780°E
  - location: Kausar Nag
  - elevation: 3,500 m (11,500 ft)
- Mouth: 33.818°N 75.066°E
  - location: Rambi Ara near Sangam
  - elevation: 1,600 m (5,200 ft)

Basin features
- Tributaries
  - left: Rambi Ara
  - right: Jhelum River

The Veshaw River is a major tributary to the River Jhelum located in Kulgam District in the Kashmir Valley in the union territory of Jammu and Kashmir, India. It originates in the Pir Panjal Range and forms a waterfall at Aharbal.

== Course ==
The river originates from a oligotrophic lake Kausarnag located at an elevation of 3,962.4 metres above sea level in District Kulgam. The river forms a water fall in Aharbal and passes through Reshinagar Adabal, Nehama, Adigen, Laisoo, Gudder, Brazloo, Ashmuji, Kelam, Nawapora, Qaimoh and joins with river Jhelum at Sangam.

== Flash floods ==
During the flash floods of 2014, Veshaw Nallah washed away various residential houses in villages Laisoo, Ardigatno, Gund Kelam Kulgam, etc. Also, hundreds of kanals of horticultural as well as agricultural land got washed away in Village Laisoo, Kulgam. The Veshaw Nallah is considered one of the most dangerous tributaries of Jhelum River because of fast flow and frequent flash floods.

== See also ==
- Kausar Nag
- Aharbal
- Mughal Road
