= The Resistance Front =

Militant group in Jammu and Kashmir, India

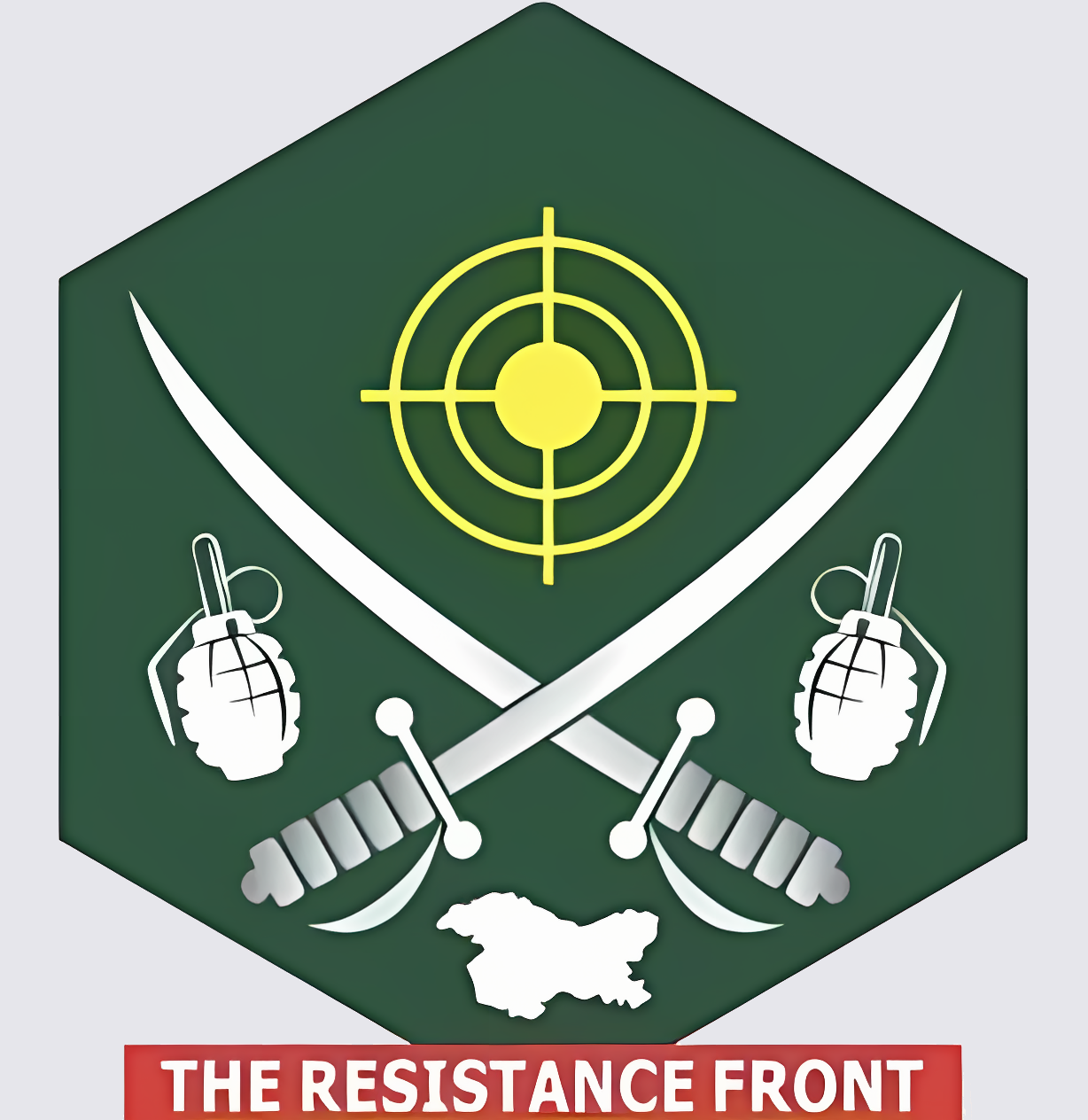
- Logo of The Resistance Front
- Founders: Muhammad Abbas Sheikh †; Sheikh Sajjad Gul
- Patron and Supreme Commander: Sheikh Sajjad Gul
- Chief Operational Commander: Muhammad Abbas Sheikh † (2019-22); Basit Ahmed Dar † (2022-24)
- Spokesperson: Ahmed Khalid
- Dates active: 2019–present
- Active regions: Jammu and Kashmir
- Part of: Lashkar-e-Taiba
- Wars: Insurgency in Jammu and Kashmir

The Resistance Front (TRF) is an Islamist militant organisation actively engaged in the insurgency in Jammu and Kashmir, and designated as a terrorist organization by India and the United States. The group is responsible for attacks on and killings of civilians, including those from religious minority communities such as Kashmiri Hindus, government employees, labourers and business owners, local politicians, and tourists, as well as for several attacks on Indian armed and police forces.

The organisation is believed to be an offshoot of Lashkar-e-Taiba, a Pakistan-based UN-designated terrorist group. Formed using cadres of militant groups Lashkar-e-Taiba and Hizbul Mujahideen in the aftermath of the 2019 abrogation of the special status of Jammu and Kashmir, TRF uses non-religious nomenclature and symbolism to project a secular image, but has carried out targeted killings of locals from religious minority communities. The group maintains a significant social media presence, some of which Indian media traces to Pakistan.

== Origins ==
The Resistance Front was founded in October 2019 following the abrogation of Article 370 and the revocation of special status to Jammu and Kashmir by the Indian government in August 2019. The TRF portrays itself as an indigenous Kashmiri resistance movement fighting for the freedom of Jammu and Kashmir from India, though it is generally believed to be a frontal organisation for the Lashkar-e-Taiba (LeT) based in Pakistan. Indian experts allege that the TRF was strategically created to divert attention from LeT and other militant groups under Financial Action Task Force (FATF) scrutiny, to maintain plausible deniability for attacks in India after Pakistan's inclusion on the FATF's "grey list" in 2018.

The TRF has been noted for using non-religious symbolism, with logos, statements, and attack rationale all being distinct from past Islamist Kashmiri insurgents such as Hizbul Mujahideen, to project a secular image, while continuing to attack religious minorities.

On 1 April 2020, the TRF gained prominence after a four-day gun battle near the Line of Control (LoC) in Kupwara's Keran Sector, during which five Indian paracommandos and five TRF militants were killed.

== Activities ==
TRF attacks have particularly targeted religious minorities in Jammu and Kashmir including Kashmiri Pandits, Hindus and Sikhs. In these attacks on civilians, LeT and HM did not claim responsibility, only the TRF did. TRF has been accused by the Indian government of links to various activities, including planning attacks on security forces and civilians, coordinating the transportation of weapons for proscribed militant groups, recruitment of militants, infiltration across borders, and smuggling of weapons and narcotics.

TRF has been active in recruitment, making it a prominent militant group in Jammu and Kashmir. The TRF has claimed responsibility for several attacks in Jammu and Kashmir against Indian forces and it has made use of social media videos and posters to spread its views.

Notably, TRF claimed responsibility for an attack on security officers in the Anantnag district using the guerilla warfare strategy, citing it as an "act of revenge" for the killing of their leader, commander Riyaz Ahmed, in Pakistan-administered Kashmir.

The Resistance Front initially took responsibility for the 2025 Pahalgam attack on tourists in Kashmir, marking the deadliest such incident in India since the 2008 Mumbai attacks. In response, Pakistan's Deputy Prime Minister and Foreign Minister, Ishaq Dar, intensified tensions by saying that the assailants "might be freedom fighters."

=== Notable incidents ===
- 5 April 2020: Two TRF militants killed five Indian PARA SF before being killed themselves, in Keran.
- 18 April 2020: TRF militants ambushed Indian forces, killing at least three and injuring 2 more, in Sopore.
- 3 May 2020: Five Indian security forces personnel, including one Colonel, one Major, and an Inspector of SOG, killed by two TRF militants who were also killed later.
- 5 May 2020: four CRPF personnel and one disabled local civilian killed and five CRPF personnel injured. Two rifles stolen from the killed CRPF troopers.
- 21 May 2020: TRF militants attacked a CRPF/JKP party, killing 2 personnel and injuring a third.
- 8 June 2020: TRF militants assassinated a Kashmiri Pandit sarpanch (village head).
- 1 July 2020: TRF militants ambushed Indian forces, killing two and injuring 3 more. A sixty-four-year-old civilian killed in cross-fire, causing anger across Kashmir.
- 8 July 2020: TRF militants kill 3 civilians, including a local politician, his father and brother.
- 25 September 2020: TRF militants assassinated Babar Qadri, a prominent local lawyer.
- 6 October 2020: TRF militants attacked the residence of a local politician, killing PSO of the BJP leader. One TRF militant also killed.
- 30 October 2020: TRF militants ambushed and killed three civilians who workers of BJP.
- 8 November 2020: TRF militants encountered Indian forces during a search operation during which three Indian Army personnel, 1 BSF personal and three TRF militants were killed.
- 23 December 2020: TRF militants threw grenades at a CRPF party and then fired upon them, killing two and injuring another.
- 31 December 2020: TRF militants assassinated Satpal Nischal, a jeweler.
- 19 February 2021: TRF militants killed two local policemen in Srinagar.
- 29 March 2021: TRF militants kill one policeman and two councillors during ambush on a meeting of municipal councillors from the BJP in Sopore.
- 1 April 2021: TRF militants kill one local policeman during attacked a politician's house.
- 22 June 2021: TRF militants assassinated a CID Inspector.
- 27 June 2021: Alleged TRF militants kill three, including a local police officer, his wife and daughter.
- 7 August 2021: TRF militants killed one local police officer and injured another.
- 5 October 2021: TRF militants assassinated Makhan Lal Bindro, a Kashmiri Pandit businessman, in Srinagar.
- 7 October 2021: TRF militants assassinated two non-Muslim teachers, including 1 Hindu and 1 Sikh, in a school in Srinagar.
- 9 October 2021: TRF militants killed two policemen.
- 13 September 2023: 2023 Anantnag encounter.
- 9 June 2024: 2024 Reasi attack.
- 22 April 2025: 2025 Pahalgam attack, initially claimed, but later retracted citing cyber intrusion. Despite the retraction, TRF is still considered to have carried out the attack.
- 24–25 April 2025: An Indian soldier killed and two other soldiers wounded during a gunfight with TRF in the area of Udhampur.
- 11 November 2026: Kulgam attack, where two TRF gunmen opened fired at a CRPF checkpoint in Kulgam district, injuring three CRPF personnel, where one of them is critically injured.

== Ban and designation ==
In January 2023, TRF was banned under the Unlawful Activities (Prevention) Act (UAPA) by the Indian government. This action designated its leader, Sheikh Sajjad Gul, as a terrorist. The ban was imposed due to the Indian government's suspicions of TRF's involvement in a conspiracy to assassinate Kashmiri journalist Shujaat Bukhari in June 2018.

On 14 May 2025, an Indian delegation met senior officials from the United Nations Office of Counter-Terrorism (UNOCT) and the Counter-Terrorism Committee Executive Directorate (CTED) in New York to advocate for The Resistance Front (TRF), a proxy of the Pakistan-based Lashkar-e-Taiba (LeT), to be listed as a UN-designated terrorist organization. The meeting took place after the Pahalgam attack, in which 26 people were killed and was claimed by TRF. The Indian delegation also met with the Monitoring Team of the UN Security Council’s 1267 Sanctions Committee, presenting evidence of TRF’s links to Lashkar-e-Taiba and its involvement in cross-border terrorism.

On 17 July 2025, the United States Department of State designated The Resistance Front as both a Foreign Terrorist Organization (FTO) and a Specially Designated Global Terrorist (SDGT). The State Department described TRF as a front and proxy for the Pakistan-based Lashkar-e-Taiba and noted that it had claimed responsibility for the April 22, 2025 Pahalgam attack, the deadliest assault on civilians in India since the 2008 Mumbai attacks. The statement also highlighted that TRF has claimed multiple other attacks against Indian security forces, including in 2024, and said the designation reflects the U.S. administration’s commitment to countering terrorism and pursuing justice for the victims of the Pahalgam attack.

In July 2025, The Resistance Front issued a statement rejecting its designation as a terrorist group by the United States, calling it politically motivated and influenced by India. Just hours earlier, Pakistan's Deputy Prime Minister Ishaq Dar had publicly criticized the U.S. decision. Intelligence sources continue to identify TRF as a front for Lashkar-e-Taiba. Pakistan’s defense of TRF has drawn criticism for backing a group linked to multiple terror attacks.

== See also ==
- Lashkar-e-Taiba
- 2025 Pahalgam attack
- 2026 Kulgam attack
