= Mir Syed Hussain Simnani =

Kashmiri Sufi

Personal life
- Born: Asad-abad Hamedan, Iran
- Relatives: Mir Syed Ali Hamdani (cousin brother)

Religious life
- Religion: Islam
- Denomination: Sunni
- Jurisprudence: Hanafi

Mir Syed Hussain Simnani was a Kashmiri Sufi saint from the 8th century Hijri, known for his role in the spread of Islam in the Kashmir Valley. He hailed from Simnan in Iran and is celebrated for his philanthropic mission and spiritual teachings in South Kashmir's Kulgam district. He is a descendant of the Islamic prophet Muhammad through his grandson Imam Hussain, being the 16th in direct descent from Ali. He was the disciple and cousin of the Sufi saint Mir Syed Ali Hamdani and the younger brother of Syed Tajuddin Hamdani.

== Early life and background ==
His arrival in Kashmir, along with other Sayyids during the reign of Sultan Shahab ud din, greatly influenced the region's religious landscape. He chose Kulgam as his permanent abode, where he was engaged in spreading Islam and was eventually buried at a spot on a cliff overlooking the river Veshaw.

== Life ==
He played a significant role in the spread of Islam in Kashmir through his missionary work and spiritual influence. Here are some key contributions he made:

- Missionary Work: He was part of a group of hundreds of missionaries who accompanied Mir Syed Ali Hamdani to propagate Islam in Kashmir. His efforts gave a considerable boost to the conversion of the people of the valley to Islam.
- Spiritual Influence: He was known for his piety, abstinence, and spiritual powers. His presence and teachings had a profound impact on the local population, leading many to embrace Islam.
- Philanthropic Mission: He engaged in philanthropic activities in Kulgam, which helped in establishing a positive image of Islam and its teachings among the local communities.
- Cultural Integration: He connected the global mystical culture of Islam, or Tasawwuf, with the local mystic culture of Kashmir, known as Rishism. This integration resulted in the permanence and dominance of a unique Islamic mystical culture in the region.
- Royal Influence: Sultan Shahab ud din, the ruler of Kashmir at the time, became a follower of Mir Syed Hussain Simnani, which likely facilitated the spread of Islam due to the king's endorsement.

His legacy is still celebrated today, and his shrine in Kulgam remains a place of pilgrimage for many devotees.

== Works ==
The autobiographical Hazrat Mir Sayid Muhammad Hussain Simnani : Qalandar-i-Sadat is attributed to him. It provides insights into Simnani's life, his journey to Kashmir, his role in reforming the thoughts and actions of the Sultans of Kashmir, and his efforts in proselytising Islam in Kashmir.
