= Pahloo =

- City
- Location in Jammu and Kashmir, India Pahloo (India)
- Coordinates: 33.65°N 75.02°E
- Country: India
- Union territory: Jammu and Kashmir
- District: Kulgam
- Elevation: 1,568 m (5,144 ft)

Languages
  - Official: Kashmiri, Urdu, Hindi, Dogri, English
- Time zone: UTC+5:30 (IST)
- Telephone code: 01933
- Vehicle registration: JK-18
- Sex ratio: ♂/♀
- Website: kulgam.gov.in

Pahloo is a town and a notified area committee in Kulgam district of the Indian union territory of Jammu and Kashmir.

== Geography ==
Pahloo block is one of the most important block of Kulgam district. The transport facilities now much better and it connects many villages like Chitripora, Chambgund, Malwan, Devsar, Khaloora, Banimullah, Chambagound etc.

There is another route that leads to these areas—the newly constructed Cham Guns Bridge—which has greatly benefited the local community.
