= Behibagh =

Village in district Kulgam, Jammu and Kashmir

Behibagh is a village located in the Kulgam district in Jammu and Kashmir, India. It is about 10 km from the city of Kulgam. The main business in the village is horticulture, especially apple orchards. There are four mosques (Masjids) in the village. There is an army camp on the Anantnag -Shopian road and a police post near PHC Behibagh. The total population of village Behibagh is 2021 consisting of 1126 males and 895 females. Shah, Dar, Rather, Wagah and Sheikh are the major casts in the village. Behibagh is famous for Eid celebration.Behibagh is known for its fruit plant nurseries, which primarily cultivate apple, and cherry saplings, and for the installation of high-density fruit plantations. Kvf, plant kingdom, Kashmir agro services, smart farming, shah nursery, sameer yousuf, are the major fruit plant nurseries. Behibagh also serves as a market center for surrounding areas. Official Data from the Periodic Labour Force Survey (PLFS) Shared by the Minister of Education in late 2025 highlighted the overall literacy rate for Jammu and Kashmir (for individuals aged 15 and above) has climbed to 82%. Baseline Data (Official 2011 Census) Historically, Behibagh village registered a lower literacy rate compared to the overall average of Jammu and Kashmir: Total Literacy Rate: 46.80% Male Literacy: 56.39% Female Literacy: 37.82%
