= Chiranbal =

Visitor Experience

Chiranbal is a tourist attraction, a meadow and a hiking destination in the Kulgam district of Jammu and Kashmir, India. It is situated at a distance of 43 km from Aharbal and 75 km from Srinagar.

Chiranbal is one of the largest sub-alpine meadow of Kashmir, provides a landscape where the snowcapped peaks of the Brahma Sakli Mountain overlook a vast area covered with emerald grassland and pine forest with the Zajinar river flowing through it. The meadow consists of twin pastures named Haer (upper) Chiranbal and Bon (lower). Bon Chiranbal placed at the higher glade of the Chinarbal Meadow has a large area of grasslands.
