= 2019 Kulgam massacre =

Terrorist attack

Kulgam massacre
- Part of the insurgency in Jammu and Kashmir
- Location: 33°38′24″N 75°01′12″E; Kulgam, Jammu and Kashmir, India
- Date: 29 October 2019
- Target: Bengali Muslim labourers
- Deaths: 7
- Injuries: 1
- Perpetrator: Hizbul Mujahideen

The 2019 Kulgam massacre refers to the killing of seven Bengali Muslim labourers in the Kulgam district of Jammu and Kashmir. The attack was carried out by members of Hizbul Mujahideen, according to Jammu and Kashmir Police it was planned by the group's commander, Ajaz Malik.

== Attack ==
The 2019 Kulgam massacre occurred when terrorists entered a home housing Bengali Muslim labourers in the union territory of Jammu and Kashmir. These men came to Kulgam to work in the apple orchards there. The terrorists, who are suspected of being Kashmiri separatists, lined up the men and killed seven of them. One of them named Baharaduddin, survived after being left for dead.

=== Victims ===
- Sheikh Rafiq (murdered)
- Naimuddin Alam (murdered)
- Qamaruddin Sheikh (murdered)
- Mursalim Sheikh (murdered)
- Rafiqul Alam (murdered)
- Baharaduddin (injured)

== Consequences ==
The chief minister of West Bengal, Mamata Banerjee, identified 130 labourers still working in Jammu and Kashmir and supported their return to their home state for safety reasons, although some of them are opted to remain in the union territory. The bodies of the victims were returned to their families by the Ministry of Home Affairs.
