= Aharbal =

Hill station in Jammu and Kashmir, India

- Hill station
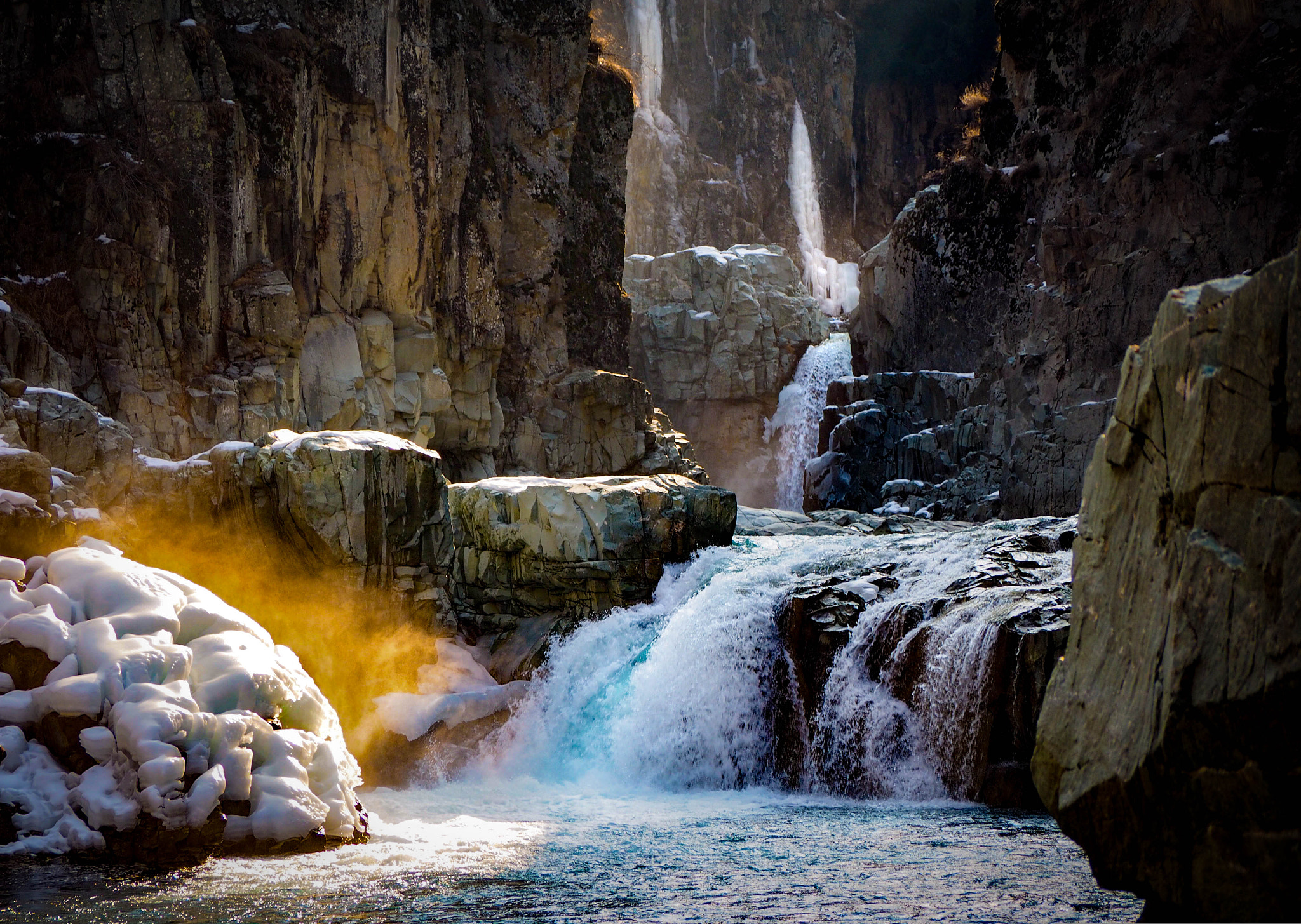
- Aharabal Falls

- Location in Jammu and Kashmir, India Aharbal (India)
- Coordinates: 33°38′45.4560″N 74°46′50.4696″E
- Country: India
- State: Jammu and Kashmir
- District: Kulgam

Government
  - Type: Democracy
- Elevation: 2,266 m (7,434 ft)

Languages
  - Official: Kashmiri, Urdu, Hindi, Dogri, English
- Time zone: UTC+5:30 (IST)
- Postal code: 192231

Aharbal is a hill station in the south-western part of Kashmir Valley in the Indian union territory of Jammu and Kashmir, south of the summer capital of Srinagar (Sub district: Damhal Hanjipora, District: Kulgam). Aharbal Waterfall is also known as Niagara Waterfall of Kashmir.

== Geography ==
Aharbal lies in the Kulgam district's Noorabad area of Jammu and Kashmir. It is located on the Veshu River, a tributary of the Jehlum River, in an alpine valley covered in pine and fir trees within the Pir Panjal mountains. It lies at an altitude of 2266 metres above sea level.

The road route is from Srinagar-Kulgam-Nihama-KB Pora-Aharbal Road.

== Aharbal Falls ==
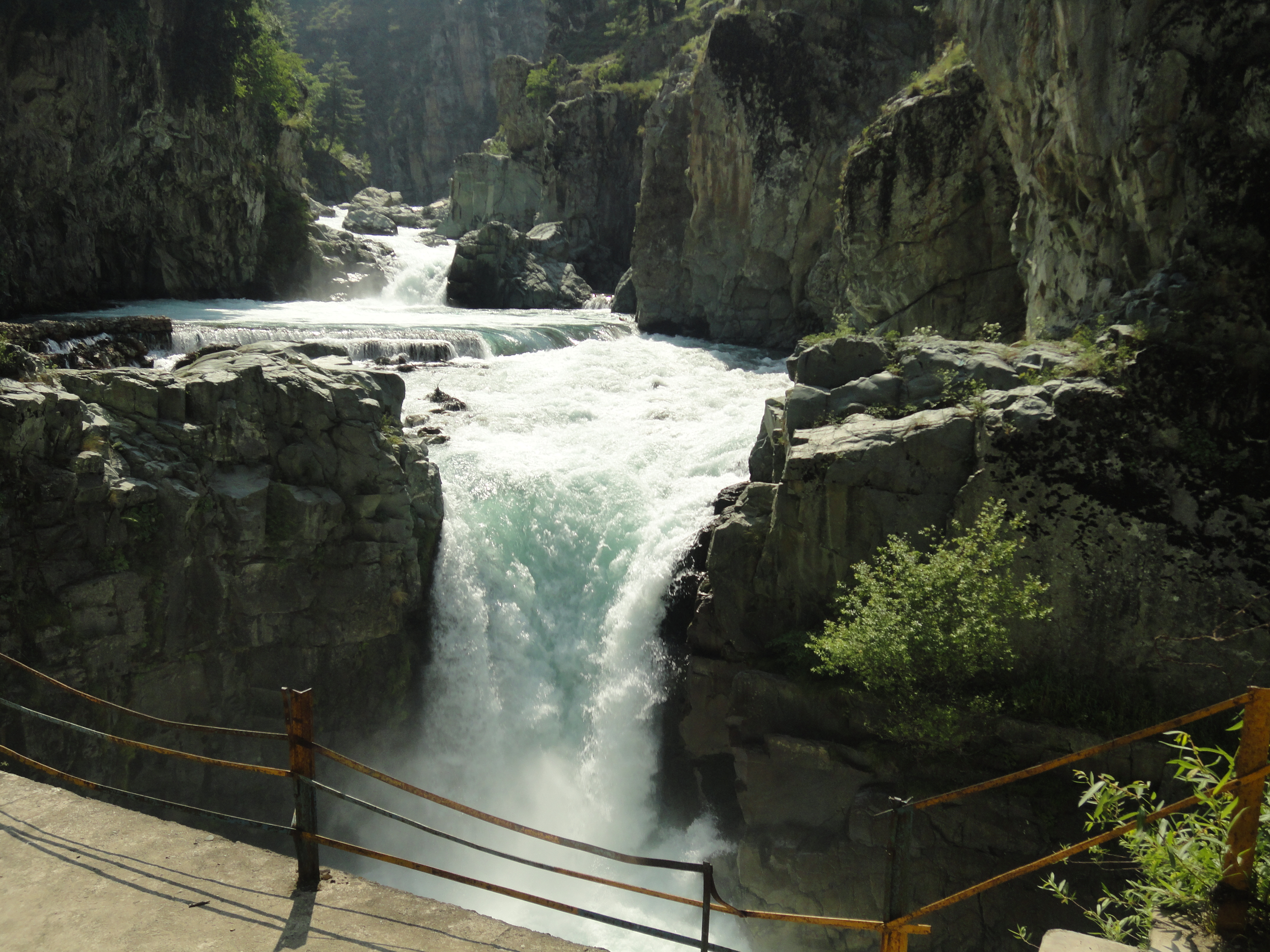
Present view of Aharbal Falls

Aharbal is noted for the waterfall known as Aharbal Falls, where the Veshu River drops about 25 metres and then 7 metres through a narrow granite gorge. The falls are sometimes referred to as the "Niagara Falls of Kashmir" owing to the water volume. According to reports, the water flow could be sufficient to generate 100 MW of hydroelectricity. The terraces near the falls are fenced, but caution is still required to avoid slipping.

The waterfall is located in the southwestern part of Kashmir and is fed by the Veshaw River, which originates from the surrounding mountains. The site is surrounded by coniferous forests and alpine landscapes. The area is also known for trekking routes and viewpoints that provide access to panoramic views of the Pir Panjal range and nearby valleys. Aharbal has developed into a local tourist destination and picnic spot, with seasonal variations attracting visitors throughout the year.

== Aharbal Development Authority ==
The Aharbal Development Authority, a government agency responsible for development in Aharbal, has built tourist infrastructure including huts and a cafeteria, and other lodging and boarding facilities have also been made available. The area is peaceful and the crime rate is very low.

The area is home to the oldest fossil site in Jammu and Kashmir. The site, located about 2 km from the Aharbal waterfall along the Kunghwatan route, is believed by experts to be rich in fossil biodiversity, with dense fossil samples at specific locations. The site is estimated to be between 488 and 354 million years old, although the exact age can be confirmed only after radiocarbon dating.

Preliminary investigations suggest that the fossils belong to the Ordovician to Devonian periods. Organisms from that era include bryozoans (colonial animals), gastropods, trilobites, early ancestors of scorpions, and ancient relatives of snails.

This recently discovered fossil site near the tourist destination of Aharbal has been secured by the Department of Archives, Archaeology and Museums.

== Access ==
Aharbal falls in Noorabad sub division of District Kulgam and is easily accessible from Srinagar via Shopian [Bab-ul-Islam], only 8 km from the Mughal Road that connects Srinagar and Poonch. The 75 km drive takes less than 3 hours by car or bus via Pulwama and Shopian. An alternate route leads to Aharbal via Kulgam-Nehama-DH pora -Kb pora -Manzgam-Wattoo-Aharabal. It is only 22 km from the District Kulgam the first District one enters the Kashmir Valley after crossing the Jawaharlal National Tunnel. The nearest railway station is Anantnag railway station at 44 km in the east.

== See also ==
- List of waterfalls
- Chiranbal
- Dal Lake
- Veshaw
- Sonamarg
- Gulmarg
- Pahalgam
- Yusmarg
- Kukernag
- Kausar Nag
- Mughal Road
- Sheikh ul-Alam International Airport
- Hirpora Wildlife Sanctuary
- Martand Sun Temple
- Kashmir Railway
