= Sheikh Sajjad Gul =

Kashmiri militant

- Born: 1974 (age 51–52); Nawa Bazar, Srinagar India
- Organization: The Resistance Front
- Known for: Founding The Resistance Front
- Movement: Insurgency in Jammu and Kashmir

Sheikh Sajjad Gul (born 1974), is a Kashmiri militant and the founder of The Resistance Front, a designated terrorist group which has been active in India's Jammu and Kashmir since 2019.

== Early life ==
Sheikh Sajjad Gul, born in 1974 in the Shah Mohalla area of Nawa Bazar in the old city of Srinagar, was educated at the National School in Srinagar’s Karan Nagar. In 1996, Gul successfully completed his BSc degree from Sri Pratap College located in Lal Chowk, Srinagar. Following this, he pursued higher education and earned an MBA from the Asia Pacific Institute of Management in Bengaluru, graduating in 1999.

During this time, he established connections with individuals associated with groups such as Tehreek-ul-Mujahideen and Lashkar-e-Taiba.

== Early militancy career ==
In 2002, Gul faced arrest in New Delhi on charges related to a hawala racket. While in Tihar jail, he reportedly established connections with prominent LeT militants also incarcerated there. Later, in 2005, Gul was transferred to Srinagar Central Jail and subsequently released in 2006.

Throughout 2016, he remained under constant police scrutiny following intelligence intercepts indicating his involvement in receiving a pistol from across the Line of Control (LoC) for an undisclosed mission. Then, in March 2017, Gul managed to obtain a passport using a fake address in Jammu, secured a visa for Pakistan, and crossed the Wagah border. His acquisition of the passport was deemed fraudulent.

== The Resistance Front ==
In 2019, following the abrogation of Article 370, Sheikh Sajjad Gul, along with Muhammad Abbas Sheikh, co-founded The Resistance Front, a separatist militant organization actively engaged in advocating for the independence of Jammu and Kashmir from India. Presently, Sheikh Sajjad Gul serves as the supreme leader of The Resistance Front.

== Designation ==
On 5 January 2023, the Indian central government banned The Resistance Front (TRF) and designated Sheikh Sajjad Gul as a terrorist. Additionally, the National Investigation Agency (NIA) has placed a reward of 1 million INR on Gul's head.
