= Larow =

- Location in Afghanistan
- Coordinates: 34°18′N 67°30′E
- Country: Afghanistan
- Province: Bamyan Province
- Time zone: + 4.30

Larow is a village in Bamyan Province in central Afghanistan.
