= Muhammad Abbas Sheikh =

Kashmiri militant (1975–2021)

- Born: 1975; Rampora Qaimoh, Jammu and Kashmir, India
- Died: 23 August 2021 (aged 45–46); Srinagar, Jammu and Kashmir, India
- Burial place: Wudder Payeen, Handwara, Jammu and Kashmir, India
- Other name: Umar Mukhtar
- Military career
- Allegiance: Hizbul Mujahideen (1996–2019); The Resistance Front (2019–2021)
- Service years: 1996–2021
- Rank: Chief Operational Commander of The Resistance Front
- Conflicts: Insurgency in Jammu and Kashmir

Muhammad Abbas Sheikh (also known as Umar Mukhtar) was a militant commander and founder and Chief of The Resistance Front, a separatist organization involved in the insurgency in Jammu and Kashmir. He was killed in an encounter with the Indian security forces on 23 August 2021. He had joined militancy in 1996 and was previously associated with Hizbul Mujahideen. He was accused of several attacks on security forces and civilians in Kashmir. He was one of the ten most wanted militants in Kashmir. He was also known for reviving militancy in Srinagar and recruiting new militants.

== Biography ==
Muhammad Abbas Sheikh was born in 1975 in Rampora village in Kulgam district, to farmer Ghulam Hassan Sheikh. He first joined militancy in 1996 by joining Hizbul Mujahideen. In 2004, he was arrested, and after his release in 2005, he rejoined militancy the same year, leading to another arrest in 2007. After being released in 2011, he briefly worked as a tailor but returned to militancy in March 2014. Since then, he has been actively involved.

In the last two years, he shifted his focus to establishing The Resistance Front (TRF) and played a significant role in its formation after leaving Hizbul Mujahideen. According to a police officer, who wished to remain anonymous, Abbas Sheikh was known for his ability to procure weapons. He commanded great respect among militants, who regarded him as a spiritual leader. This reputation contributed to the rapid growth of TRF and attracted several new recruits in a short time. Sheikh was listed among the 'ten most wanted' militants shared by the police in July 2021.

In the past six years, Sheikh managed to escape several times during gunfights by breaking through the security cordons.

More than two dozen members of his extended family have been militants. He was the sixteenth militant from the immediate family to have been killed in a gunfight. His sister, Naseema Bano, was booked under the Unlawful Activities (Prevention) Act (UAPA) in June 2020 for allegedly aiding militants. Her son, Touseef Sheikh, was involved in militancy and was killed in a gunfight.

According to police officials, Sheikh played a crucial role in the insurgency by providing the capability to recruit, motivate, and survive. Police sources also revealed that Sheikh was instrumental in revitalizing militancy in Srinagar, the capital city. Within six months of being declared militancy-free in 2020, Srinagar saw the recruitment of seven new militants, attributed to Sheikh's influence.

== Family ==
The Sheikh family's involvement in militancy spans generations, with 17 young men lost over the past two decades. Ibrahim, Abbas Sheikh's elder brother, was among the first to take up arms in the early 1990s and was killed in 1996. Though Abbas remained committed to militancy, enduring arrests in 2004 and 2007. His younger brother, Ashraf, also became a militant, purchasing an AK-47, but was killed within 40 days. 15 more close relatives, including nephews Asiful Islam and Tawseef Sheikh, sons of his sisters, followed a similar path, with Tawseef's mother herself facing arrest for alleged involvement and spending over a year in jail. She was accused of motivating young men to join militancy. Shabbir Ahmad Sheikh and Maqbool Ahmad Sheikh, paternal cousins of Sheikh, both lost their lives after joining the militancy. They lived in the same compound as Abbas Sheikh's family.

The chain of militants from the family extended beyond Kulgam, including relatives from Bijbehara, Tral, and Shopian districts. Irshad Ahmad Lone, a cousin, was killed in a non-militant-related army shootout.

== Death ==
In a daylight operation, Abbas Sheikh and his associate Saqib Manzoor Dar were killed by Jammu and Kashmir Police in Aloochi Bagh in Srinagar on 23 August 2021. Inspector General Vijay Kumar stated that 10 plainclothes officers warned the militants before exchanging gunfire. Abbas, known for inciting youth to join militants, was buried far from home in Wudder Payeen Handwara, with restricted attendance at the funeral. Eyewitnesses described chaos as police surrounded the scene, emptying the area within moments.
