= 2006 Kulgam massacre =

Terrorist incident in India

2006 Kulgam massacre was the killing of nine Nepalese and Bihari labourers and a Muslim Kashmiri Indian Army soldier by Hizbul Mujahideen militants in a broad daylight near Yaripora in Kulgam area of Anantnag district in the Kashmir Valley on 12 June 2006.

== Background ==
The group of labourers consisted of 9 Hindus and 1 Muslim (whom the terrorists did not kill). They had come to Kashmir from Siliguri as they had heard that wages were good. They were hired to build a wall around a house in Hangalbuch. On the morning of the massacre it had been raining and they took an early break for lunch. A local Muslim, Abdullah Teli, was cooking lunch for them.

== The Attack ==
The seven unidentified gunmen wearing combat fatigues, kidnapped Mushtaq Ahmed Sheikh a newly recruited soldier of Rashtriya Rifles and thirteen Nepali and Bihari labourers. Later they tortured and beheaded Sheikh. The labourers were lined up and asked to undress. One of them Mahammad Naimuddin was identified as a Muslim and asked to step aside. Then the labourers were fired on indiscriminately leading to the death of nine of them.

== The aftermath ==
300 Muslims of Kulgam witnessed the funerals. The police claimed that the pro-Pakistan terrorist organization, Hizbul Mujahideen was believed to be responsible for the attack. However, in 2007 Australian government in declaring Lashkar-e-Taiba a Terrorist organisation also attributed this massacre jointly to it.
