= Sangam, Anantnag =

Village in Jammu & Kashmir, India

Sangam Anantnag disputed Sangam
- Village
- Sangam
- Location in Jammu & Kashmir, India Sangam Anantnag disputed (India)
- Coordinates: 33.828217°N 75.070842°E
- Country: India
- Union Territory: Jammu & Kashmir
- Division: Kashmir
- District: Anantnag
- Tehsil: Bijbehara

Languages
  - Official: Kashmiri, Urdu, Hindi, Dogri, English

Sangam is a village situated on Jammu–Srinagar National Highway in the Bijbehara tehsil of the Anantnag district of Jammu and Kashmir, India.
