= Devsar, Jammu and Kashmir =

Devsar Qasba/Bona Devsar
- Village
- Location in Jammu and Kashmir, India Devsar (India)
- Coordinates: 33.63°N 75.07°E
- Country: India
- Union Territory: Jammu and Kashmir
- District: Kulgam
- Elevation: 1,664 m (5,459 ft)

Languages
  - Official: Kashmiri, Urdu, Hindi, Dogri, English
- Time zone: UTC+5:30 (IST)
- PIN: 192231
- Telephone code: 019322
- Vehicle registration: JK-18
- Sex ratio: ♂/♀
- Website: kulgam.gov.in

Devsar (or Qasba/Bona Devsar) is a town and tehsil notified area committee in Kulgam district in the Indian union territory of Jammu and Kashmir. It is one of the seven administrative blocks of the Kulgam district. The city is connected to Kulgam and Qazigund by a two-lane road (NH444). This road has been funded by Asian Development Bank. Devsar is home to various religious places or Shrines. The famous among are Hazrat Khan Sb, Hazrat Ameer Kabeer, Ded Moj Sb, and many Hindu Temples including Mata Tripur Sundari Khanabarani.
