= Kulgam district =

Kulgam, Jammu and Kashmir

Kulgam district Kolgom
- District of Jammu and Kashmir administered by India.
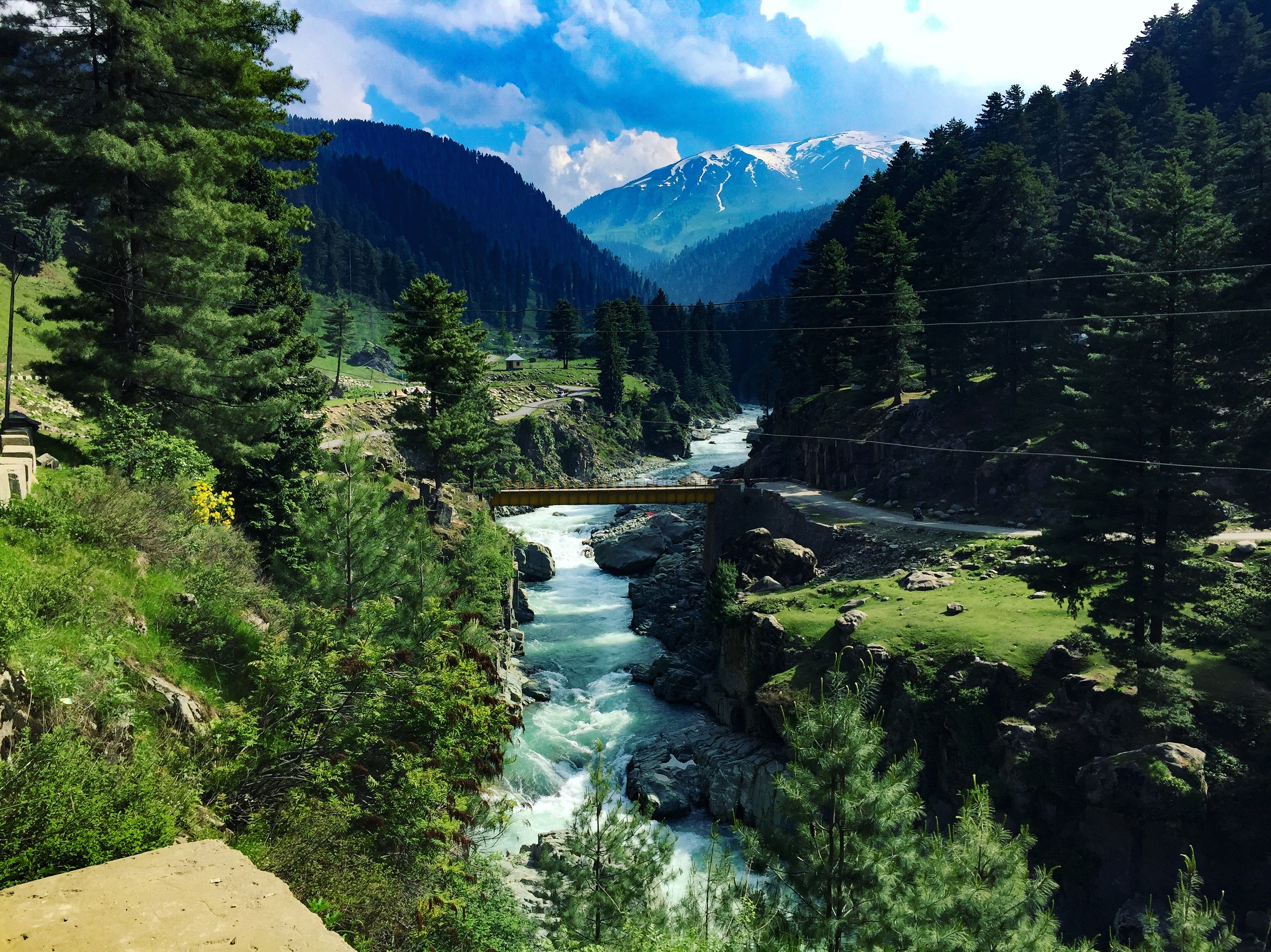
- Aharbal Falls

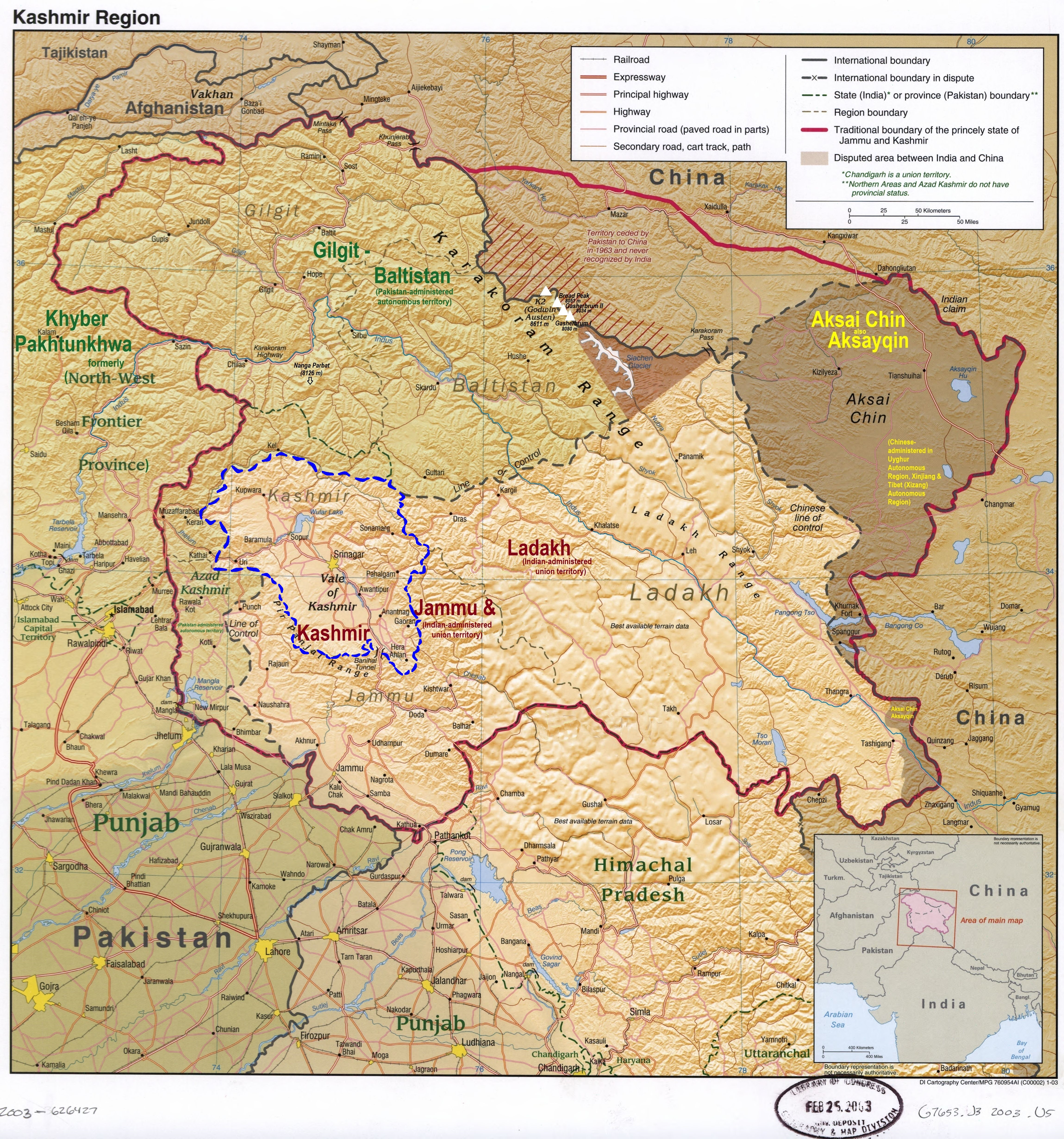
- Kulgam district is in Indian-administered Jammu and Kashmir in the disputed Kashmir region It is in the Kashmir division (bordered in neon blue).
- Interactive map of Kulgam district
- Coordinates (Kulgam): 33°38′24″N 75°01′12″E
- Administering country: India
- Union Territory: Jammu and Kashmir
- Headquarters: Kulgam

Government
  - Body: Municipal Committee

Area
  - Total: 1,067 km^{2} (412 sq mi)

Population (2011)
  - Total: 424,483
  - Density: 397.8/km^{2} (1,030/sq mi)

Languages
  - Official: Kashmiri, Urdu, Hindi, Dogri, English
- Time zone: UTC+5:30 (IST)
- PIN: 192231
- Vehicle registration: JK18
- Website: kulgam.nic.in

Kulgam district is an administrative district of Indian-administered Jammu and Kashmir in the disputed Kashmir region. It is in the Kashmir division and is located at a distance of 18 kilometres (11 mi) towards south-west of Anantnag. The district comprises block, tehsil and town of Kulgam.

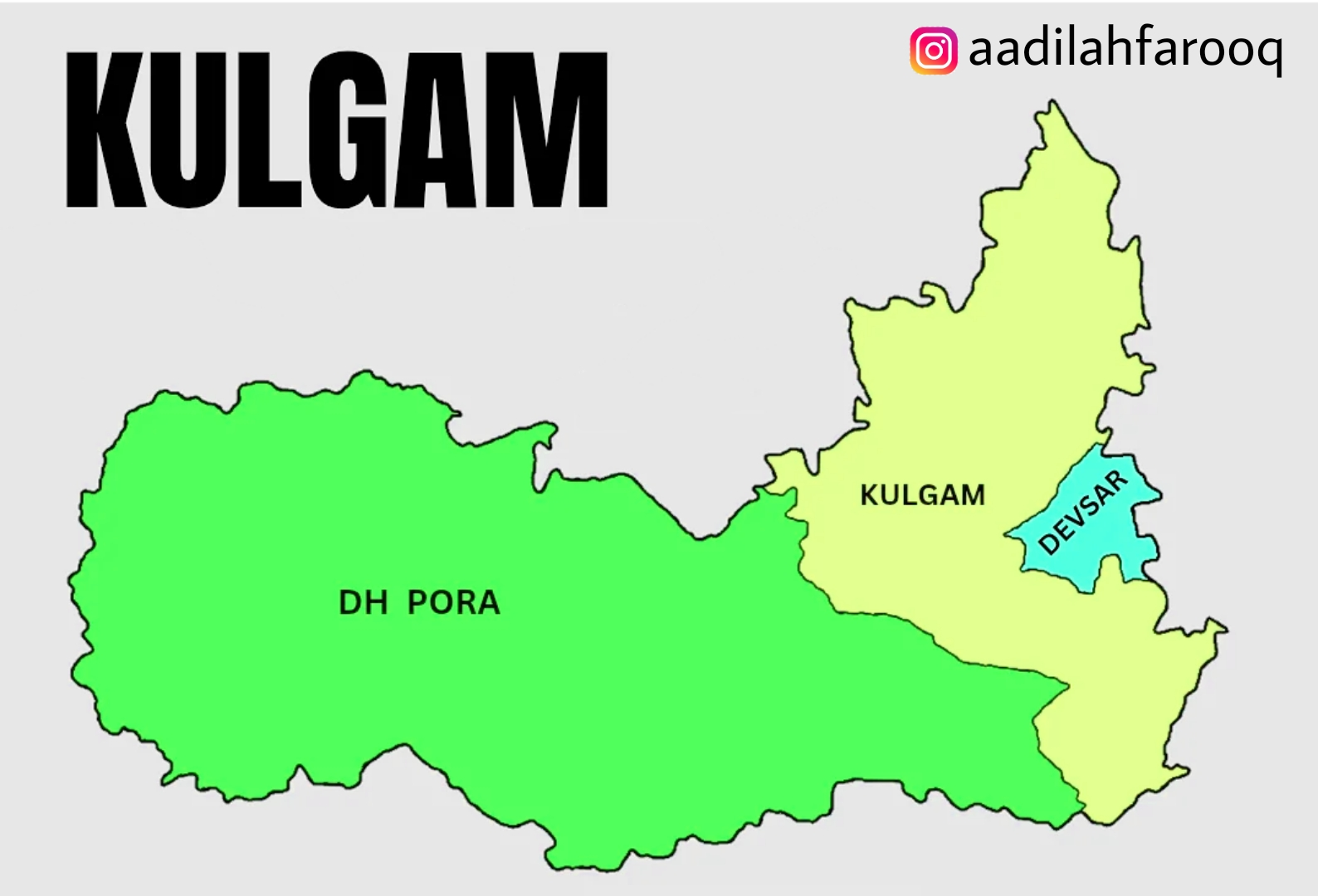
District map of Kulgam

== Location ==
Kulgam is situated near the Pir Panjal Range, overlooking the left bank of the Veshaw River, along a rough, hilly road from Larow. The Veshaw River, which drains most of the northern face of the Pir Panjal Range, is the main left-bank tributary of the Jhelum River and traverses through District Kulgam. The Veshaw is broken into a number of channels to provide drinking water and irrigation for large tracts of the district's land.

The town of Kulgam is situated about 68 km (42 mi) from Srinagar and about 17 kilometres (11 mi) from Anantnag. Roads connect it to the neighbouring districts of Shopian, Pulwama, Anantnag, and Banihal.

== History ==
Tazkira Sadat-i-Simanania, compiled by 13th-century scholar and poet Swaleh Reshi, gives the name of place as "Shampora". Mir Syed Hussain Simnani later renamed it "Kulgam" (kul for 'clan' and gram for 'village' in Sanskrit). Simnani is said to have invited Mir Sayyid Ali Hamadani to Kashmir, with poets including Nund Rishi (Sheikh Noor-ud-din Noorani (RA)) and Lalleshwari. These poets and their disciples manifested the composite culture or Kashmiriyat, promoting and encouraging religious and cultural harmony even when viewed as heretics by other Asiatic countries.

The form of administration from Sher Shah Suri's reign led to creation of a Tehsil during Mughal Rule, through the aegis of Sheikh Hamza Makhdoom. This had jurisdiction encompassing Doru, Banihal, Gulabgarh, and Shopian. After time, constituent units including Pulwama, Shopian, and Reasi attained the status of district.

The area had been a hunting place for Mughal emperors and Dogra rulers, especially for Shahanshah Shah Jehan, who laid the "Chinar Bagh" and Maharaja Hari Singh, who discovered the virgin potential of sanctuary at Kutbal. The District is the birthplace of Sheikh Noor-ud-din Noorani, the founder of the Rishi order, and of the forefathers of Allama Iqbal and Jawaharlal Nehru.

=== Rebel groups ===
There has been insurgency in Kashmir since 1989. Beginning in the 1990s there is an upsurge of Rebel groups in the district, particularly the Lashkar-e-Taiba and Hizbul Mujahideen. the rebels encourage the populace to boycott elections.

Kulgam has witnessed several Insurgency-related incidents over the years, including 2006 Kulgam massacre, 2019 Kulgam massacre, 2018 Kulgam encounter and 2026 Kulgam attack by Lashkar-e-Taiba on a checkpoint of the Central Reserve Police.

== Demographics ==
According to the 2011 census, Kulgam district has a population of 424,483. This gives it a ranking of 554th in India (out of 640). The district has a population density of 925 inhabitants per square kilometre (2,400/sq mi). Its population growth rate over the decade 2001–2011 was 7.3%. Kulgam has a sex ratio of 951 females for every 1000 males (this varies with religion), and a literacy rate of 60.3%. The density of population of the district is 1051 persons per km^{2} as compared to 124 persons for the state according to the Census figures of 2011. 18.99% of the population lives in urban areas. Scheduled Tribes constitutes 6.25% of the district population.

Religion in Kulgam district (2011)
| Religion | Percent |
| Islam | 98.49% |
| Hinduism | 1.01% |
| Other or not stated | 0.5% |

Sex Ratio in Kulgam District in 2011 Census. (no. females per 1,000 males)
| Religion (and population) | Sex Ratio |
| Muslim (pop 418,076) | 962 |
| Hindu (pop 4,267) | 284 |
| Other (pop 2,140) | 744 |
| Total (pop 424,483) | 951 |

Kulgam district: religion, gender ratio, and % urban of population, according to the 2011 Census.
| | Hindu | Muslim | Christian | Sikh | Buddhist | Jain | Other | Not stated | Total |
|---|---|---|---|---|---|---|---|---|---|
| Total | 4,267 | 418,076 | 460 | 1,035 | 27 | 25 | 9 | 584 | 424,483 |
| Total | 1.01% | 98.49% | 0.11% | 0.24% | 0.01% | 0.01% | 0.00% | 0.14% | 100.00% |
| Male | 3,324 | 213,069 | 264 | 581 | 19 | 12 | 5 | 346 | 217,620 |
| Female | 943 | 205,007 | 196 | 454 | 8 | 13 | 4 | 238 | 206,863 |
| Gender ratio (% female) | 22.1% | 49.0% | 42.6% | 43.9% | 29.6% | 52.0% | 44.4% | 40.8% | 48.7% |
| Sex ratio (no. of females per 1,000 males) | 284 | 962 | – | 781 | – | – | – | 688 | 951 |
| Urban | 2,141 | 78,219 | 116 | 85 | 6 | 3 | 0 | 43 | 80,613 |
| Rural | 2,126 | 339,857 | 344 | 950 | 21 | 22 | 9 | 541 | 343,870 |
| % Urban | 50.2% | 18.7% | 25.2% | 8.2% | 22.2% | 12.0% | 0.0% | 7.4% | 19.0% |

Languages of Kulgam district (2011)
1. Kashmiri (91.9%)
2. Gojri (6.43%)
3. Others (1.66%)

At the time of the 2011 census, 91.91% of the population spoke Kashmiri and 6.43% Gojri as their first language.

== Administration ==
District Kulgam was separated from district Anantnag, along with several other new districts, and made administratively separate from 2 April 2007.

Kulgam district currently consists of eleven blocks: Kulgam, D.H Pora, Devsar, Pahloo, Qaimoh, Kund, Manzgam, Frisal, Pombay, Behibagh, and D.K. Marg. This has not always been the case, in the 2008 reorganisation the district consisted of five blocks. Each block consists of a number of panchayats (English: 'assembly rule', a traditional system of local government).

The district has seven administrative units (Tehsils): Kulgam, Damhal Hanji Pora, Devsar, Frisal, Pahloo, Yaripora, and Qaimoh. Kulgam district has Five important towns: Frisal, Yaripora, Kulgam, Devsar, and Damhal Hanji Pora. Four of these have received municipality status; Damhal Hanji Pora has yet to be recognized as a municipality.

There are five police stations in the district at: Kulgam, Damhal Hanji Pora, Qazigund, Yaripora and Devsar, and six police posts at: Qaimoh, Frisal, Mir Bazar, Behibagh, Kund and Jawahir Tunnel.

Kulgam has two sub-divisions: Kulgam and Damhal Hanji Pora.

=== District Development Council ===
DDC Kulgam

- Chairperson: Mohd Afzal Parrey (CPI(M))
- Vice-chairperson: Shazia Jan (JKNC)

| S.No | Party | Alliance | No. of Members |
|---|---|---|---|
| 1. | Communist Party of India (Marxist) | PAGD | 5 |
| 2. | JKNC | PAGD | 5 |
| 3. | JKPDP | PAGD | 2 |
| 4. | Indian National Congress | United Progressive Alliance | 2 |
| Total | | | 14 |

== Politics ==
Kulgam district has 3 assembly constituencies: Kulgam, Damhal Hanji Pora, and Devsar. The parties of the current members of the legislative assembly (MLAs) are: Jammu and Kashmir National Conference (JKNC) for Damhal Hanji Pora and Devsar and the Communist Party of India (Marxist) (CPI(M)) for Kulgam.

Ithas three municipal towns – Yaripora, Frisal and Qaimoh – which are also tehsil headquarters. Yaripora is an education and health block, while Qaimoh is agriculture as well as education and health blocks. Frisal is a community development block.

== Road facility ==
Kulgam has following roads connecting it to various assembly segments and with NH1A (major district roads):

- Kulgam - Anantnag Main Road
- Kulgam - NH44 via Manigam
- Kulgam - Qazigund NH44
- Kulgam - Mirbazar NH44 via Kilam
- Kulgam - Yaripora
- Kulgam - Aharbal via Nehama
- Kulgam - Aharbal via Damhal Hanji Pora
- Kulgam - Damhal Hanji Pora via Adijan
- Kulgam - Shopian via Nillow
- Kulgam - Shopian via Nehama
- Kulgam - Devsar
- Kulgam - Wanpoh via Ban
- Kulgam - Ahmedabad via Khul

== Health facilities ==
- District Hospital at Kulgam
- Sub district hospital at Yaripora
- Sub district hospital at Qazigund
- Sub district hospital D. H.Pora (But without infrastructure and doctors)

== Habitation and environment ==
The main source of livelihood in the district is agriculture and horticulture. The low-lying areas of Kulgam are very fertile for rice cultivation, and are considered as the 'Rice Bowl of Kashmir'. The higher elevations are known for production of apples. Livestock and sheep-rearing is a subsidiary occupation among the rural population, particularly in the higher elevations.

Kulgam District is covered by the Pir Panjal mountain range on the southwest side, acting as a massive topographical protection. The area is significantly covered in forestation.

== Tourism ==
Town Kulgam is situated about 68 km (42 mi) from Srinagar and about 17 km (11 mi) from Anantnag. Aside from places of spiritual interest, the district has tourist spots like Aharbal water fall on Veshew river which is a place of sight-seeing in the extreme south-west. High pastures and meadows are also places of tourist attraction in the area from Kund to Ladigasan (ahead of Aherbal clefts). The District also has an abundance of natural water from springs such as Kausar Nag, Waseknag, Khee Nag, etc.

== Photo gallery ==
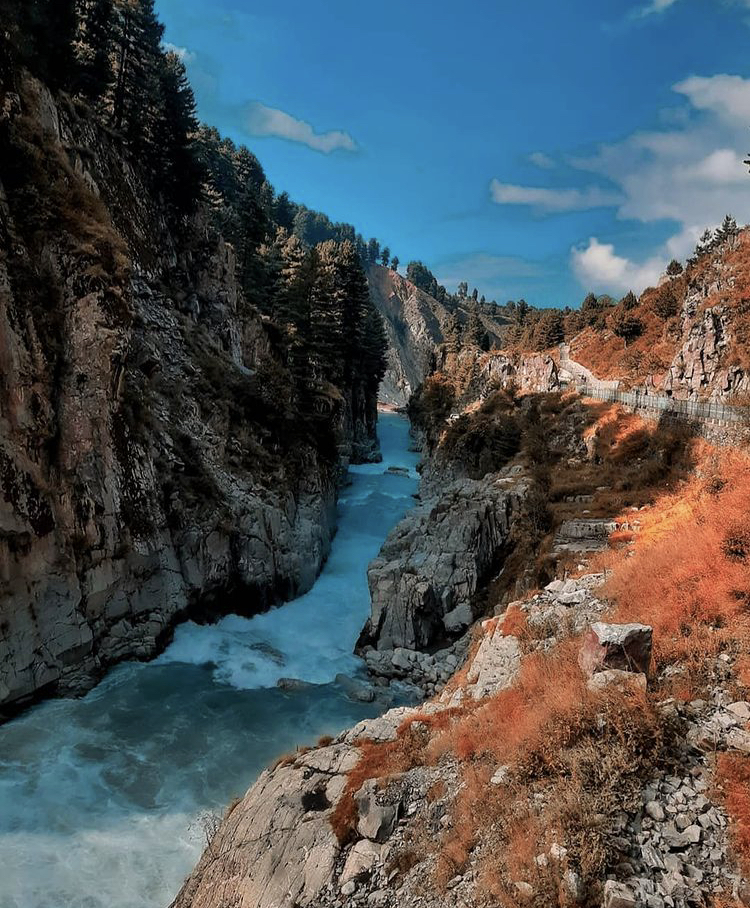
Aharbal Fall

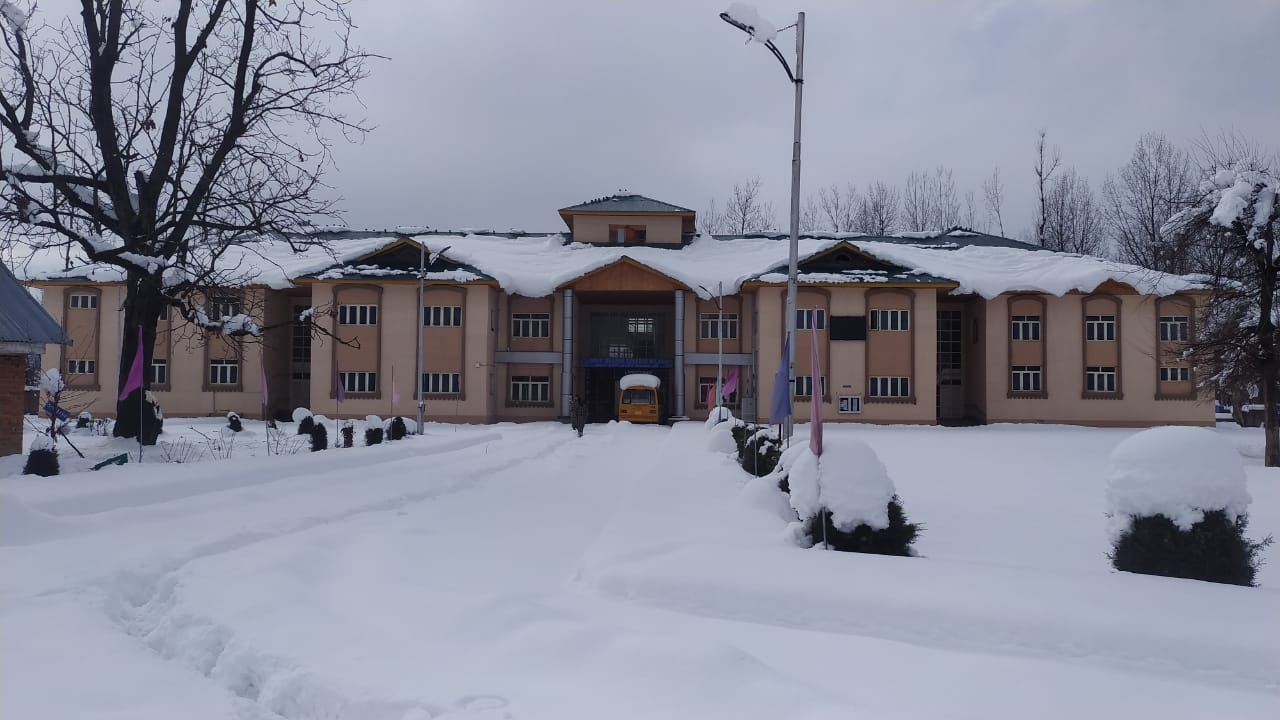
GDC Kilam

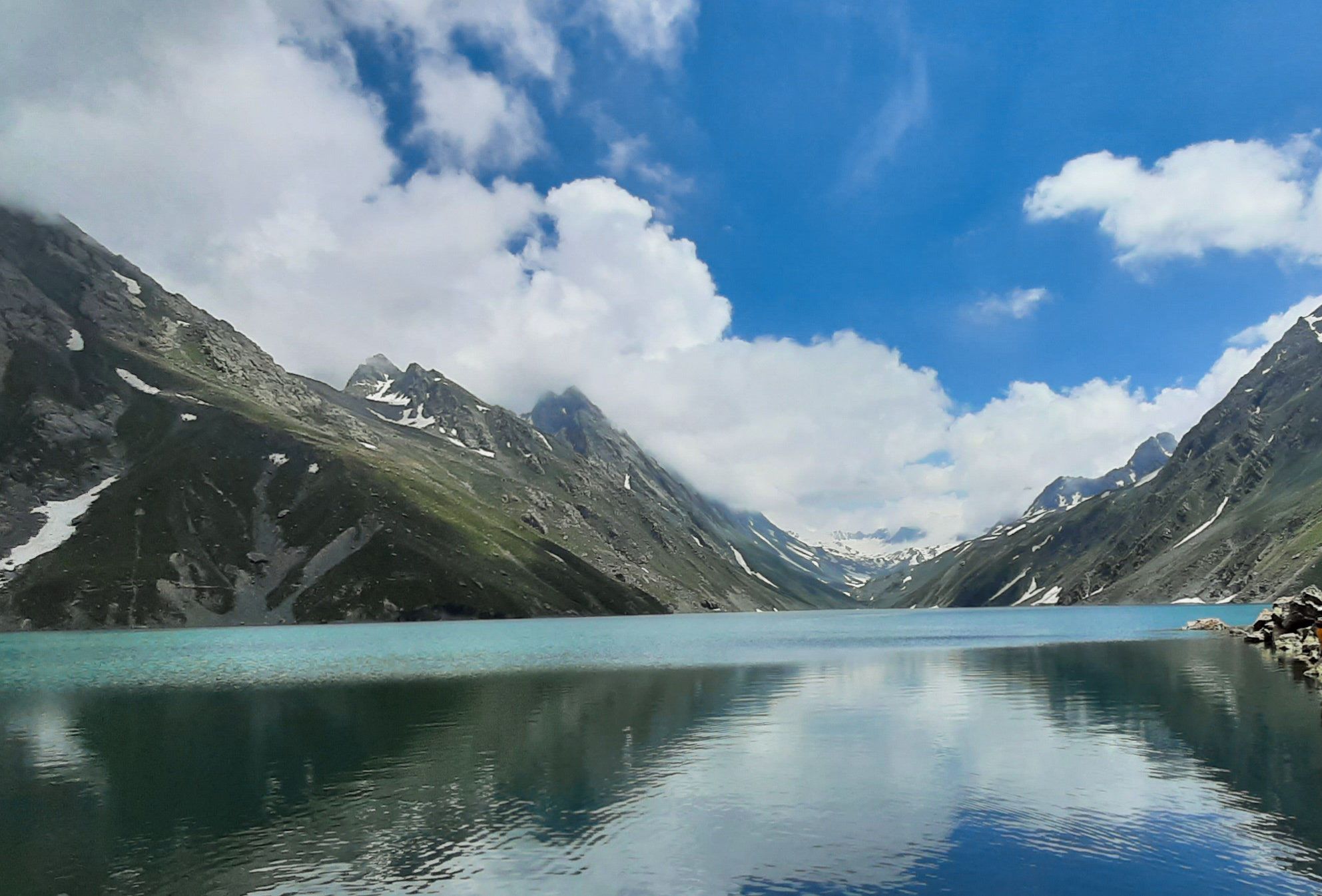
Kausarnag Lake

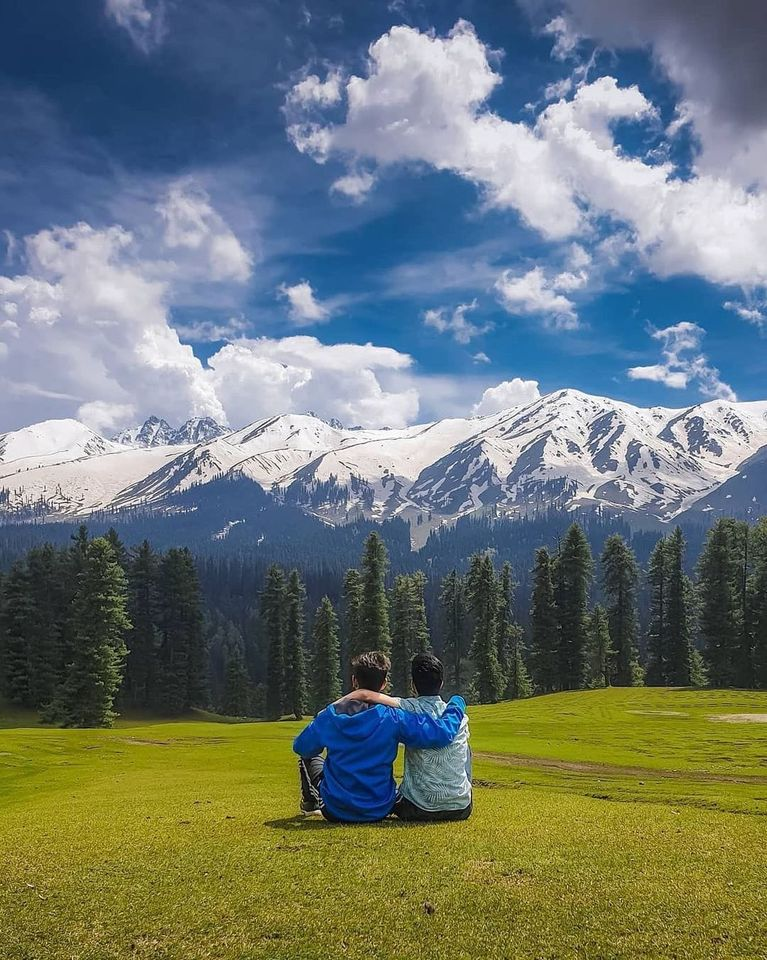
Chiranbal Meadows

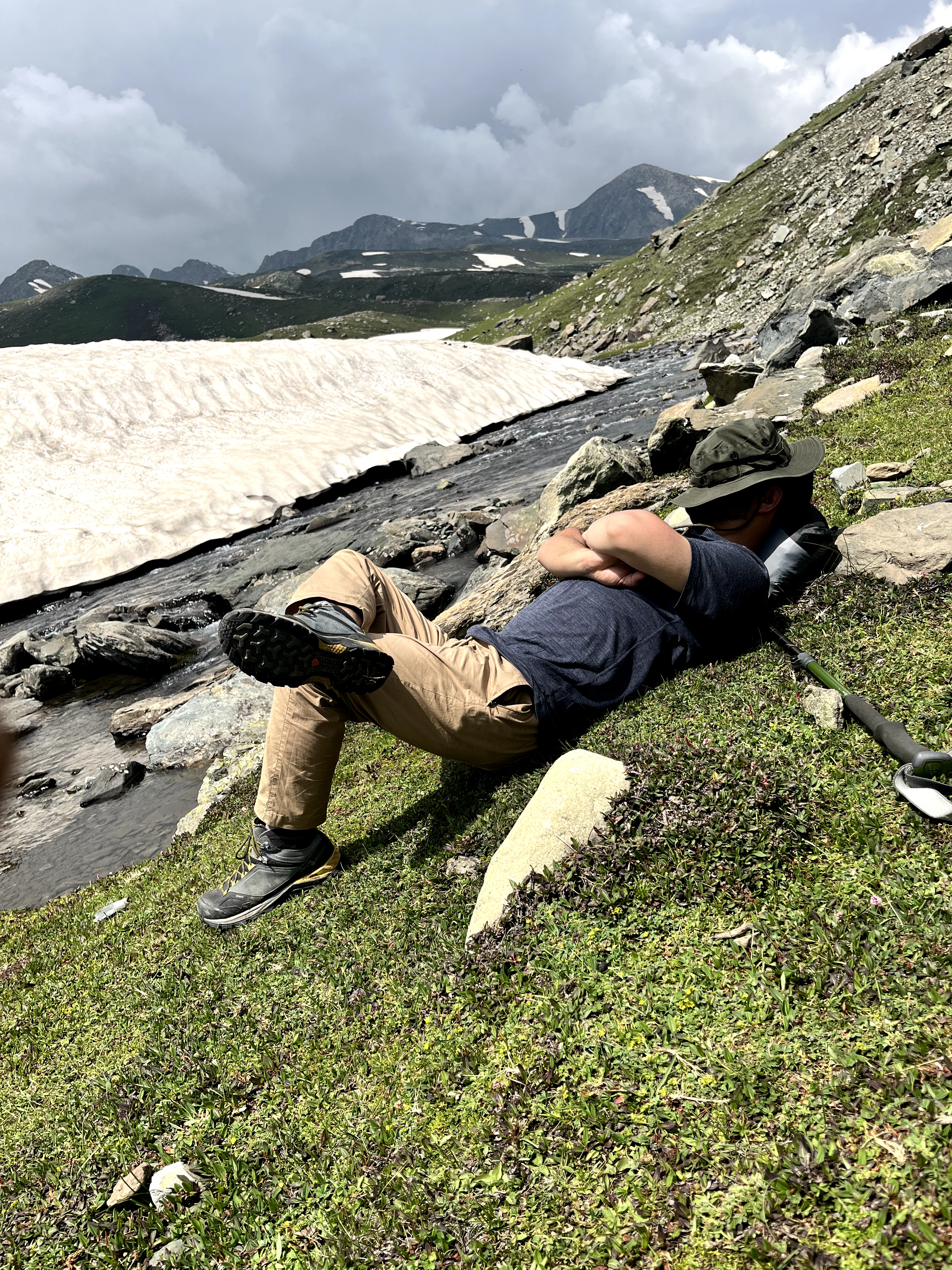
Zagimarg Kulgam

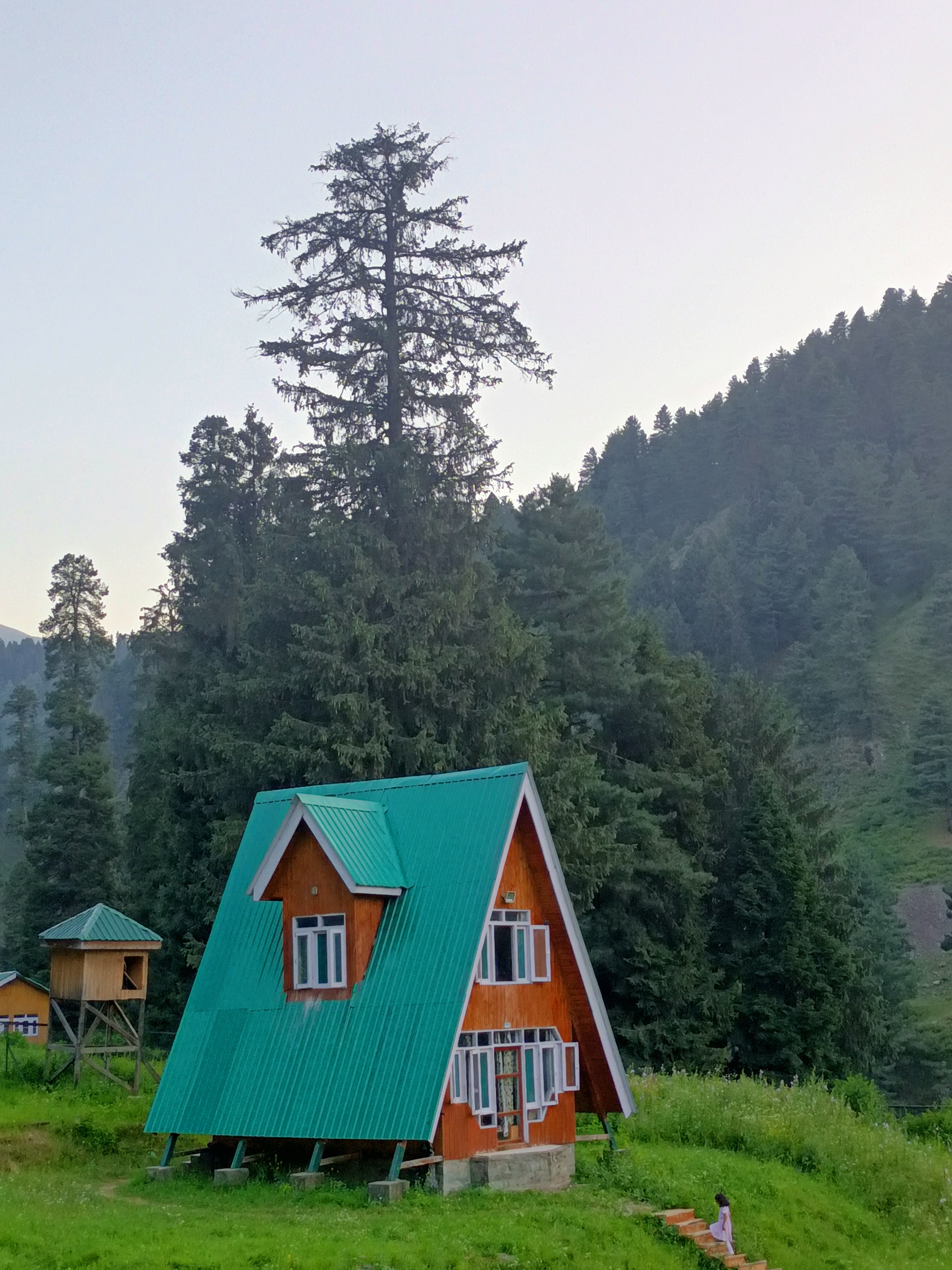
Hut in Aharbal

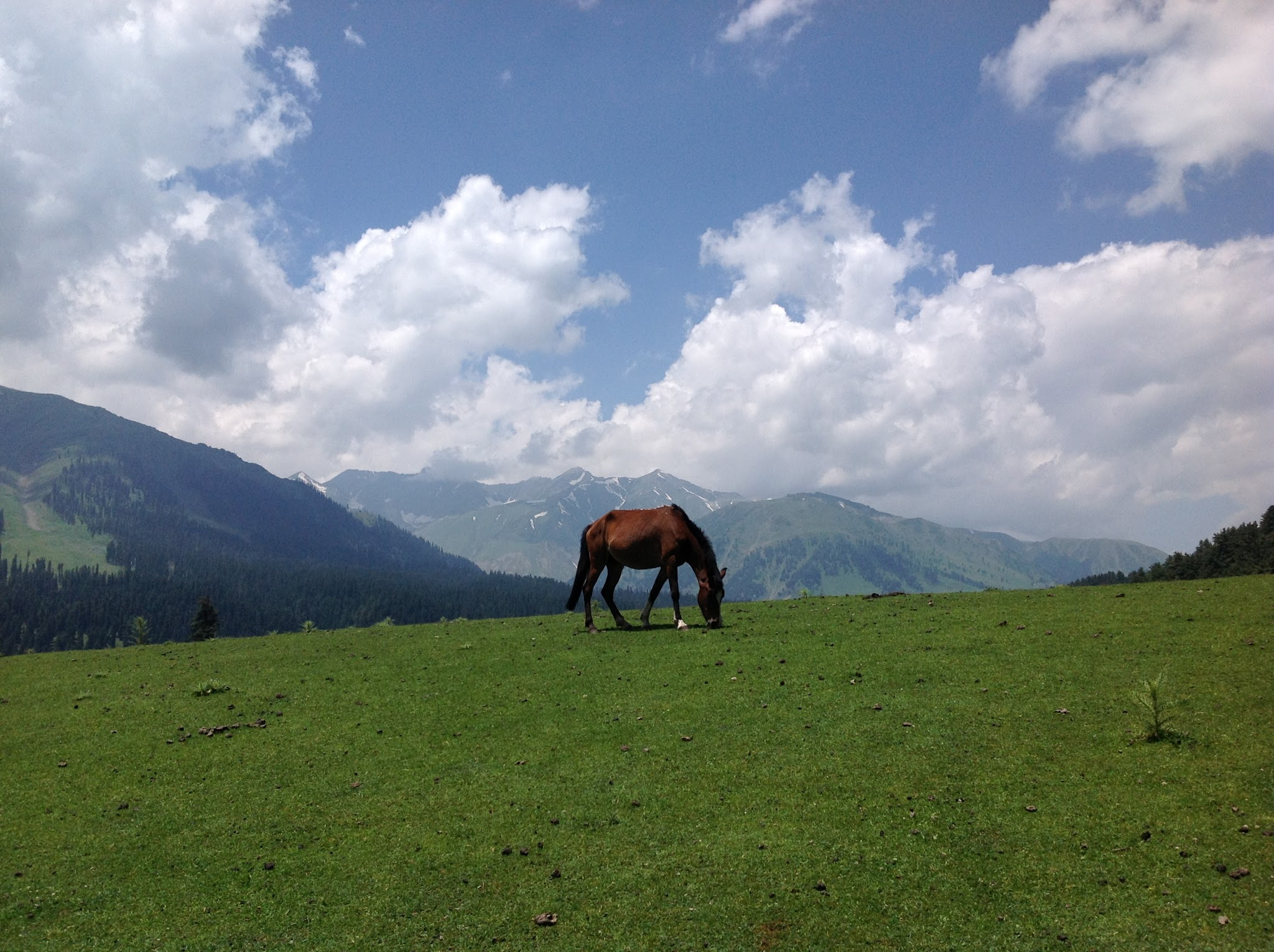
Chiranbal fields
