= Kulgam =

Kulgam Kolgom
- Town
- Location in Jammu and Kashmir, India Kulgam (India)
- Coordinates: 33°38′24″N 75°01′12″E
- Country: India
- Union territory: Jammu and Kashmir
- District: Kulgam

Government
  - Type: Municipal Council
  - Body: Govt. of Jammu & Kashmir
  - Chairperson DDC: Muhammad Afzal Parray

Area
  - Total: 18.51 km^{2} (7.15 sq mi)
- Elevation: 1,739 m (5,705 ft)

Population (2011)
  - Total: 23,584
  - Density: 1,274/km^{2} (3,300/sq mi)

Languages
  - Official: Kashmiri, Urdu, Hindi, Dogri, English

Demographics
  - Literacy rate: 69.2%
  - Sex ratio: 871.0 ♀/ 1000 ♂
- Time zone: UTC+5:30 (IST)
- PIN CODE: 192231,
- Telephone code: 01931
- Vehicle registration: JK18
- Website: https://kulgam.nic.in/

Kulgam (Urdu pronunciation: [kʊlɡɑːm]), known as Kolgom (Kashmiri pronunciation: [kɔlɡoːm]) in Kashmiri, is a town, the administrative headquarters of Kulgam district in the Indian union territory of Jammu and Kashmir, a region disputed between India and Pakistan. It is located approximately 67 km (42 mi) from the summer capital, Srinagar. Kulgam district was carved out from the erstwhile Anantnag district on 2 April 2007. The town is divided into 16 electoral wards and had a population of 23,584 as of the 2011 census, of which 12,605 were male and 10,979 female.

== Etymology ==
The word "Kulgam" has multiple proposed derivations. According to the Tazkira Sadat-i-Simanania, compiled by the 13th-century scholar Swaleh Reshi, the place was originally called "Shampora". The Iranian saint Syed Hussain Simnani later renamed it "Kulgam", from the Sanskrit kula ("clan") and grāma ("village").

== History ==
=== Ancient period ===
An archaeological site at the nearby village of Kutbal has yielded evidence of habitation dating to the Kushan Empire period (1st to 4th centuries CE). Excavations have uncovered stamped tiles and other artifacts indicating urban settlement and artistic production. The plateau of Kutbal is believed to have been a significant settlement during the Kushan period. The region formed a province of the Kushan Empire, with evidence of a permanent currency mint operating in Kashmir during this period.

=== Medieval and Mughal period ===
During the reign of Sher Shah Suri, administrative reforms led to the creation of a tehsil (administrative unit) in the area, which was maintained during Mughal rule under the aegis of Sheikh Hamza Makhdoom. This tehsil had jurisdiction over Doru, Banihal, Gulabgarh, and Shopian. The area was used as a hunting ground by Mughal emperors, including Shah Jahan, who planted the Chinarbagh (garden of chinar trees), and later by the Dogra ruler Maharaja Hari Singh.

Kulgam is notable as the birthplace of Sheikh Noor-ud-din Noorani (Nund Rishi), the founder of the Rishi order of Sufis in Kashmir, who was born in the village of Qaimoh in 1377 CE. The ancestors of the poet Allama Iqbal (from Supur village) and of Jawaharlal Nehru (from Nadi Marag village) also originated from the Kulgam area.

=== Modern period ===
Kulgam remained part of Anantnag district until 2 April 2007, when it was established as a separate district. The town has since developed as the administrative headquarters of the new district. Kulgam has witnessed several Insurgency-related incidents over the years, including 2006 Kulgam massacre, 2019 Kulgam massacre, 2018 Kulgam encounter and 2026 Kulgam attack by Lashkar-e-Taiba on a checkpoint of the Central Reserve Police.

== Geography ==
Kulgam is located at 33°38′24″N 75°01′12″E at an average elevation of 1,739 m (5,705 ft) above sea level. The town lies on the banks of the Veshaw River (also spelled Veshav), a left-bank tributary of the Jhelum River that drains from the northern slopes of the Pir Panjal Range.

The district is bounded to the east and north by Anantnag and Shopian districts, and to the south and southwest by Reasi, Ramban, and Rajouri districts, separated by the Pir Panjal range. The district covers a geographical area of 1,067 square kilometers.

== Demographics ==
As of the 2011 Indian census, Kulgam town had a population of 23,584. There were 12,605 males (53%) and 10,979 females (47%). Of the population, 3,353 (14.2%) were age 0-6: 1,787 males (53%) and 1,566 females (47%). The literacy rate for the population over six years of age was 69.2% (males 80.7%, females 56.1%).

Religion in Kulgam Town (2011)
1. Islam (95.3%)
2. Hinduism (4.18%)
3. Sikhism (0.11%)
4. Christianity (0.25%)
5. Buddhism (0.01%)
6. Jainism (0.01%)
7. Not Stated (0.10%)

Historical population
Year	Pop.	±% p.a.
1911	1,795	—
1961	4,599	+1.90%
1971	6,369	+3.31%
1981	8,202	+2.56%
2001	13,136	+2.38%
2011	23,584	+6.03%

== Places of interest ==
Kulgam district contains several natural, historical, and religious sites.

=== Natural sites ===
- Aharbal Waterfall – Located on the Veshaw River, approximately 25 km from Kulgam town, the waterfall drops 25 metres and is known as the "Niagara Falls of Kashmir". The site offers fishing and trekking opportunities.
- Kounsarnag Lake – A snow-fed lake situated at approximately 4,000 metres above sea level, nestled in the Pir Panjal peaks. It is the source of the Veshaw River and can be reached via a three-day trek from Aharbal through Kungwattan and Mahinag.
- Chiranbal – A montane meadow located approximately 6 km from Manzgam, divided into Hear (small) and Bon (big) Chiranbal. The site is situated along the Zajinar River.
- Badi Bahek – An alpine pasture in DH Pora, surrounded by pine forests, used for camping and trekking.
- Vasak Nag Kund – A cold water spring in Kund village, Tehsil Devsar, notable for flowing only six months of the year and disappearing underground from September to April. The spring is the focus of local beliefs involving the Sufi saint Syed Noor Shah Baghdadi.

=== Religious sites ===
- Ziyarat Sharief Sheikh ul Aalam (RA) Chimmer – Shrine dedicated to Sheikh Noor-ud-din Noorani (Nund Rishi), who was born in Qaimoh and spent part of his life in a cave in Guffabal village before his retirement to meditation.
- Syed Simnania (RA) Ziyarat Sharief Kulgam – Shrine of the Iranian saint Syed Hussain Simnani, who is credited with renaming the town. According to tradition, his shrine was erected at the spot where he first settled.
- Panchanpathri D K Marg – A valley located near the Sheikh ul Aalam shrine at Chimmer, used for leisure activities including skiing in winter and cricket during other seasons.

=== Historical site ===
- Houen Heng – A peak at 4,200 metres above sea level where a Fokker F-27 aircraft crashed on 7 February 1966, killing all 37 people on board. Wreckage remains preserved at the site.

== Transport ==
=== Road ===
Kulgam is connected by road to neighboring districts including Shopian, Pulwama, Anantnag, and Ramban, as well as to remote areas within the district.

=== Rail ===
The town does not have its own railway station. The nearest railway stations are Anantnag railway station (approximately 17 km away) and Qazigund railway station (approximately 10-20 km away).

=== Air ===
The nearest airport is Sheikh ul-Alam International Airport in Srinagar, located approximately 85 km from Kulgam.

== Healthcare ==
Healthcare facilities in Kulgam include:

- District Hospital Kulgam
- Sub-district hospitals at Damhal Hanjipora and Yaripora
- 24x7 Emergency Hospital at Qazigund
- Primary Health Centres (PHCs) at Frisal, Qaimoh, Bugam, Pahloo, Devsar, Behibagh, Mohammad Pora, Katrsoo, Kilam, Akhran, and other locations.

In July 2025, the Assistant Regional Transport Office in collaboration with the Health department organized a medical and eye check-up camp for commercial drivers in the district as part of road safety initiatives.

== Photo Gallery ==
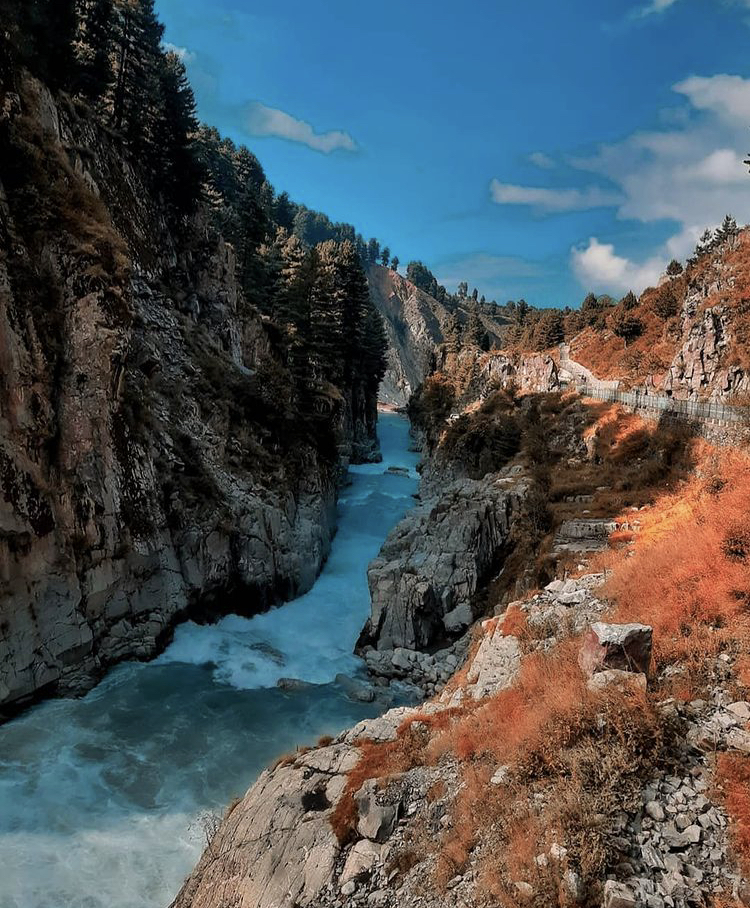
Aharbal Fall

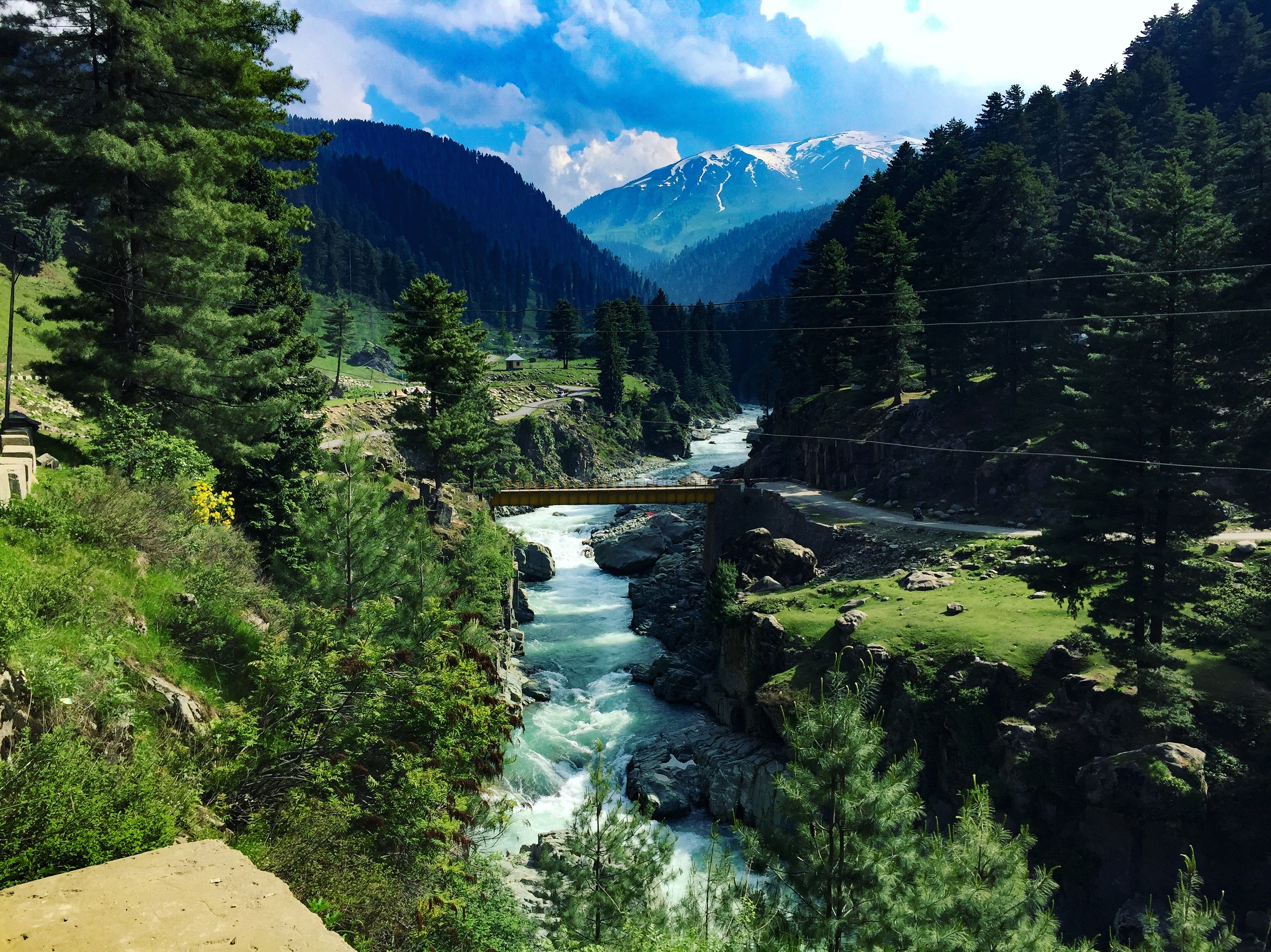
Aharbal
