= Pethbugh =

Village in Shahabad Anantnag

- Village
- Pethbugh
- Location within Jammu and Kashmir Location within India
- Coordinates: 33.6788°N 75.1593°E
- Country: India
- Union territory: Jammu and Kashmir
- District: Anantanag

Languages
  - Official: Kashmiri, Urdu, Hindi, Dogri, English
- Time zone: UTC+5:30 (IST)
- Postal code: 192210

Pethbugh is a village in Anantnag tehsil in Anantnag District in the Indian union territory of Jammu and Kashmir. It is located 7 km (4.3 mi) towards the south from the district headquarters Anantnag and 64 km (40 mi) from the summer capital of Srinagar. The Pin code of Pethbugh is 192210 and postal head office is Dialgam. The present Lambardar of Pethbugh is Mr. Fayaz Ahmad Bhat. Pethbugh is surrounded by Anantnag Tehsil towards the north, Qazigund Tehsil towards the south, Qaimoh Tehsil towards the west, and Pahloo Tehsil towards the east. Anantnag, Srinagar, Udhampur, and Rajauri are the nearby cities to Pethbugh. This place is in the border of the Anantnag and Kulgam districts. The nearest Railway Station (1.5km). Towards the west is SADURA. The Block Office of the village is BDO Office Larkipora (Shahabad). The nearest villages on boundary line are, Dialgam, Kamad, Ugjan, Schichen, Fathepora, and Sadoora.

== Demographics ==
Kashmiri is the local language. People also speak English Urdu and Hindi.

== Transport ==
=== Rail ===
Sadura Railway Station and Qazigund Railway Station are very nearby railway stations to Pethbugh. However, Jammu Tawi railway station is major railway station 124 km (77 mi) near to Pethbugh.

Nearest bus stand is Achabal Adda Anantnag (6km).

== Education ==
=== Colleges ===
- Government Degree college Doru
- Government Degree college (Boys) Anantnag
- Government Degree college (Women's) Anantnag

=== Schools ===
- M S Pethbugh
- M S Dialgam
- H S S Dialgam
- P S Pethnugh bungam

== See also ==
- Doru shahabad
- Khanabal
- Chowgam
- Awantipora
- Kulgam District
- Pahalgam
- Fatehpora
