= Furrah =

- Village
- Location within Jammu and Kashmir
- Coordinates: 33.700975°N 75.124718°E
- Country: India
- State: Jammu and Kashmir
- District: Anantnag district

Area
  - Total: 178.5 ha (441 acres)

Population (2011)
  - Total: 2,532
  - Density: 1,418/km^{2} (3,674/sq mi)

Languages
  - Spoken: Kashmiri, Urdu, English
- Time zone: UTC+5:30 (IST)
- PIN: 192101

Furrah is a village in the Anantnag district of the disputed territory of Jammu and Kashmir. It has nearly 1500 households.

The village is located just 4 km away from main city of Anantnag. A railway line passes to one side of the village. Forah has more than 65% of literacy rate. This village is home to many high officials of bank, education department and other departments. Present president of J&K lecturer's form Dr. Manzoor ahmed rather belongs to this village.

Agriculture is the main industry of the village.

== Location ==
Forah is located 4 km south from district headquarters Anantnag. The nearby villages are:

- Ashajipora - 3 km
- Monghall - 1 km
- Lalan and Ganoora - 1 km
- Dialgam - 3 km
- Khanabal - 5 km

Forah is about 1.5 km from the [[National Highway 1A (India, old numbering )|National Highway 1A]], which acts as a border between Anantnag and Kulgam district.

== Demographics ==
Kashmiri is the local language. Sandran is the only river flowing through the area.

== Education ==
=== Colleges ===
- Government Boys Degree College, Khanabal, Anantnag
- Government Degree College, Anantnag (for women)

=== Schools ===
- Govt. Higher Secondary School, Forah, Anantnag
- Govt. Boys higher Secondary School, Anantnag
- Govt. Girls Higher Secondary School, Anantnag (Ranibagh)
