= List of Himalayan peaks and passes =

Overall, the Himalayan mountain system is the world's highest, and is home to 10 of 14 of the world's highest peaks, the Eight-thousanders, and more than 50 peaks over 7,000 metres (23,000 ft). The Karakoram and Hindu Kush are regarded as separate ranges whose peaks are not included in this table. In the table below sorting by coordinates sorts by longitude (i.e. West to East) and "HP" = High point.

== Peaks ==
Major mountains
Global rank	Peaks	Other names and meaning	Elevation		Prominence (metres)	Isolation (km)	Region	Coordinates	Country (disputed claims in italics)	First Ascent	Notes
Global rank	Peaks	Other names and meaning	m	ft	Prominence (metres)	Isolation (km)	Region	Coordinates	Country (disputed claims in italics)	First Ascent	Notes
1	Mount Everest	Sagarmatha, Chomolungma	8,848.86	29,032	8,848	infinite	Mahalangur	27°59′17″N 86°55′31″E	China • Nepal	1953	Highest peak in the world
3	Kanchenjunga	"Five treasures of great snow"	8,586	28,169	3,922	124.3	Nepal/India	27°42′12″N 88°08′51″E	India • Nepal	1955	Third highest peak in the world, Easternmost 8000m peak
4	Lhotse	"South Peak"	8,516	27,940	610	2.7	Mahalangur	27°57′42″N 86°55′59″E	Nepal • China	1956	Part of Everest massif
5	Makalu	"The Great Black"	8,485	27,838	2,378	17.2	Mahalangur	27°53′23″N 87°05′20″E	Nepal • China	1955	East of Mt. Everest
6	Cho Oyu	"Turquoise Goddess"	8,188	27,162	2,430	28.5	Mahalangur	28°05′39″N 86°39′39″E	Nepal • China	1954	Easiest 8000m peak
7	Dhaulagiri I	"White Mountain"	8,167	26,795	3,357	317.6	Central	28°41′48″N 83°29′35″E	Nepal	1960	West of Gandaki River
8	Manaslu	Kutang, "Mountain of the Spirit","Killer Mountain"	8,163	26,781	3,092	105.6	Central	28°33′00″N 84°33′35″E	Nepal	1956	
9	Nanga Parbat	Diamir, "Naked Mountain"	8,126	26,660	4,608	188.5	Gilgit-Baltistan (GB) region	35°14′14″N 74°35′21″E	Pakistan (Note: In India's disputed Gilgit-Baltistan region, claimed by Pakistan.)	1953	Westernmost peak of Himalayas, rises 7000m above Indus River.
10	Annapurna I	"Goddess of the Harvests"	8,091	26,568	2,984	33.9	Central	28°35′44″N 83°49′13″E	Nepal	1950	North of Pokhara
14	Shishapangma	"Crest above the grassy plains", Gosainthan	8,027	26,450	2,897	91.3	Central	28°21′12″N 85°46′43″E	Nepal • China	1964	About 10 km north of Nepal border.
15	Gyachung Kang	Buddha's Peak	7,952	26,224	672	7.6	Mahalangur	28°05′53″N 86°44′32″E	Nepal • China	1964	Highest mountain under 8,000m
16	Nuptse	"West Peak" in Tibetan	7,864	26,076	305	3.4	Mahalangur	27°57′59″N 86°53′24″E	Nepal	1961	sub peak of Lhotse
23	Nanda Devi	"Bliss-giving Goddess"	7,817	25,646	3,139	388.7	Garhwal	30°22′33″N 79°58′15″E	India	1936	HP Uttarakhand. Highest peak entirely within India.
28	Namcha Barwa		7,782	25,531	4,160	707.8	Arunachal Pradesh	29°37′52″N 95°03′19″E	India • China	1992	Eastern end of Himalaya
29	Kamet		7,756	25,446	2,825	70.3	Garhwal	30°55′12″N 79°35′30″E	India	1931	
34	Gurla Mandhata		7,694	25,400	2,788	127.5	West Tibetan	30°26′19″N 81°17′48″E	India • China	1985	
40	Gangkhar Puensum	Gankar Punzum, "Three Mountain Siblings"	7,570	25,256	3,025	228.1	Bhutanese	28°02′50″N 90°27′19″E	Bhutan	unclimbed	HP Bhutan. World's highest unclimbed peak. Off-limits.
45	Kula Kangri		7,538	24,928	1,654	25.4	Bhutanese	28°13′37″N 90°36′59″E	China (Bhutan)	1986	
62	Yangra	Ganesh I	7,429	24,600	2,352	48.1	Central	28°23′29″N 85°07′38″E	Nepal • China	1955	
75	Labuche Kang		7,367	24,259	1,957	38.3	Central	28°18′15″N 86°21′03″E	Nepal • China	1987	
78	Jomolhari		7,326	24,035	2,065	106	Bhutanese	27°49′36″N 89°16′04″E	Bhutan • China	1937	
84	Gyala Peri		7,294	23,930	2,942	20.4	Tibet	29°48′52″N 94°58′07″E	China	1986	
98	Langtang Lirung		7,234	23,698	1,534	24.5	Central	28°15′22″N 85°31′01″E	Nepal	1978	
102	Tongshanjiabu		7,207	23,616	1,757	38.8	Bhutanese	28°11′12″N 89°57′27″E	Bhutan • China	unclimbed	
104	Noijin Kangsang		7,190	23,583	2,160	88.4	East Tibetan	28°56′48″N 90°10′42″E	China	1986	
120	Nun		7,135	23,409	2,404	166.7	Kashmir Valley	33°58′48″N 76°01′18″E	India (Note: In Pakistan's disputed Jammu and Kashmir (Union territory) region, claimed by India.)	1953	
148	Kangto		7,090	23,163	2,195	189.6	Arunachal Pradesh	27°51′54″N 92°31′57″E	India • China		
	Machapuchare	"Fish Tail"	6,993	22,943	1233	9.2	Central	28°29′42″N 83°56′57″E	Nepal	1957‡	Sacred to Shiva, off-limits. ‡(short of summit)
	Dorje Lakpa	"Langtang Himal"	6,966	22,854	796	15.1	Central	28°10′26″N 85°46′45″E	Nepal	1992	NW of Kathmandu.
	Kedarnath Main	"The Great God"	6,940	22,763	1027	10.3	Himalayas	30°47′42″N 79°04′10″E	India	1947	
	Kedarnath Dome	"Kedarnath II"	6,831	22,406	1027	10.3	Himalayas	30°48′31″N 79°04′44″E	India	1947	
	Ama Dablam	"Mother And Her Necklace"	6,814	22,350			Mahalangur	27°51′40″N 86°51′40″E	Nepal	1961	
	Kangtega	"The Snow Saddle"	6,782	22,251			Mahalangur	27°47′00″N 86°49′00″E	Nepal		
	Gangchenta	"Tiger Mountain"	6,678	21,909	1495	22.85	Bhutanese	28°06′11″N 89°32′52″E	Bhutan • China	Unclimbed	
	Mount Kailash	Kang Rinpoche (Precious Snow Peak)	6,638	21,778	1319	66.0	West Tibetan	31°4′0″N 81°18′45″E	Nepal	Unclimbed	Sacred to four religions, near sources of four major rivers.
	Mana Peak	"Manaswini"	6,561	21,520			Himalayas	31°05′13″N 79°27′06″E	India	1972	
	Tserim Kang		6,532	21,430	812	4.34	Bhutanese	27°52′20″N 89°22′09″E	Bhutan • China	Unclimbed	
	Bandarpunch	"Mahalangur Hanuman"	6,498	21,313			Mahalangur	30°47′42″N 79°04′10″E	India	1947	

== Passes and routes ==
The rugged terrain makes few routes through the mountains possible. Routes through the Himalaya include:

Notable passes and routes
Pass or route	Elevation		Coordinates	Notes
Pass or route	m	ft	Coordinates	Notes
Banihal Pass	2,832	9,291	33°30′25″N 75°12′40″E	Connecting the hill areas of Jammu to the Kashmir Valley. The Jawahar tunnel, Pir Panjal Railway Tunnel and Banihal Qazigund Road Tunnel pass under it.
Zoji La	3,528	11,575	34°16′44″N 75°28′19″E	Between the vale of Kashmir and the Kargil district, and is the only western entrance to the highlands of Ladakh. The under construction Zoji-la Tunnel passes under it.
Rohtang Pass	3,973	13,035	32°22′17″N 77°14′47″E	Connects the Kullu Valley to Lahaul in Himachal Pradesh and further to Ladakh. The Atal Tunnel passes under it.
Bara-lacha la	4,450	14,600	32°45′31″N 77°25′13″E	On the road between Lahaul, Himachal Pradesh and Leh, Ladakh
Khardung La	5,600	18,373	34°16′42″N 77°36′15″E	On the road between Diskit town and Galwan Valley in Ladakh, India. 3rd highest motorable road in India and in the world.
Kunzum Pass	4,590	15,060	32°23′56″N 77°38′8″E	Between the Lahaul and Spiti valleys in Himachal Pradesh, India
Changla Pass	5,036	16,522	34°02′49″N 77°55′50″E	On the road between Pangong Tso and Leh Town in Ladakh, India.
Mohan Pass	1,800	5,900	30°14′18″N 77°57′47″E	The principal pass in the Siwalik Hills, the southernmost and geologically youngest foothills running parallel to the main Himalayas, between the Gangetic Plain and Doon valley in Uttarakhand.
Shipki La	4,500	14,764	31°49′55″N 78°44′02″E	On the road between Shimla in Himachal Pradesh, India and Tibet
Umling La	5,798	19,022	32°41′35″N 79°16′17″E	Connecting Demchok and Chisumle villages, 230 km from Leh Town in Ladakh. Highest motorable road in the world. Stretching for 86 km, the temperature ranges from -10 °C to -20 °C. Oxygen level is 50% less than normal range.
Mana Pass	5,632	18,478	31°04′06″N 79°25′00″E	On the border between Tibet and Garhwal, Uttarakhand State of India. Second-highest motorable road in India and in the world.
Lipulekh Pass	4,400	14,436	30°14′03″N 81°01′44″E	On the road between Kalapani in Kumaon, India and Lake Manasarovar near mount Kailash in Tibet
Thorong La	5,416	17,769	28°47′37″N 83°56′14″E	The high point of the Annapurna Circuit, it connects the Manang District to the Mustang District in Nepal.
Kora La	4,594	15,072	29°18′14″N 83°58′7″E	On the Nepal-Tibet border at the upper end of Mustang. The Kali Gandaki Gorge (a graben), transects the main Himalaya and Transhimalayan ranges. Kora La is the lowest pass through both ranges between K2 and Everest, but some 300 metres (980 ft) higher than Nathula and Jelepla passes further east between Sikkim and Tibet.
Arniko Rajmarg/Friendship Highway route	5,260	17,260	27°58′25″N 85°57′46″E	From Kathmandu, Nepal crossing into Tibet at Kodari/Zhangmu, to Nyalam, Lalung-La pass (5,050m/16,570 ft), Tingri, Shelkar, Gyatso La pass, to Lhatse on the Yarlung Tsangpo/Brahmaputra River about 460 road km west of Lhasa
Nathu La	4,310	14,140	27°23′13″N 88°49′51″E	Connecting Sikkim, India to Lhasa, Tibet
Jelep La	4,252	13,950	27°22′02″N 88°51′57″E	On the road between Kupup town and Baba Hanuman Singh Mandir in Sikkim state, India
Sela Pass	4,225	13,862	27°30′17″N 92°06′17″E	On the road between Bomdila town and Tawang Town in Arunachal Pradesh state, India

== Map ==
The major peaks (not mountains) above 7,500 m (24,600 ft) height in Himalayas, rank identified in Himalayas alone (not the world).
Legend
- 1：Mount Everest
- 2：Kangchenjunga
- 3：Lhotse
- 4：Yalung Kang, Kanchenjunga West
- 5：Makalu
- 6：Kangchenjunga South
- 7：Kangchenjunga Central
- 8：Cho Oyu
- 9：Dhaulagiri
- 10：Manaslu (Kutang)
- 11：Nanga Parbat (Diamer)
- 12：Annapurna
- 13：Shishapangma (Shishasbangma, Xixiabangma)
- 14：Manaslu East
- 15：Annapurna East Peak
- 16： Gyachung Kang
- 17：Annapurna II
- 18：Tenzing Peak (Ngojumba Kang, Ngozumpa Kang, Ngojumba Ri)
- 19：Kangbachen
- 20：Himalchuli (Himal Chuli)
- 21：Ngadi Chuli (Peak 29, Dakura, Dakum, Dunapurna)
- 22：Nuptse (Nubtse)
- 23：Nanda Devi
- 24：Chomo Lonzo (Chomolonzo, Chomolönzo, Chomo Lönzo, Jomolönzo, Lhamalangcho)
- 25：Namcha Barwa (Namchabarwa)
- 26：Zemu Kang (Zemu Gap Peak)
- 27：Kamet
- 28：Dhaulagiri II
- 29：Ngojumba Kang II
- 30：Dhaulagiri III
- 31：Kumbhakarna Mountain (Mount Kumbhakarna, Jannu)
- 32：Gurla Mandhata (Naimona'nyi, Namu Nan)
- 33：Hillary Peak (Ngojumba Kang III)
- 34：Molamenqing (Phola Gangchen)
- 35：Dhaulagiri IV
- 36：Annapurna Fang
- 37：Silver Crag
- 38：Kangbachen Southwest
- 39：Gangkhar Puensum (Gangkar Punsum)
- 40：Annapurna III
- 41：Himalchuli West
- 42：Annapurna IV
- 43：Kula Kangri
- 44：Liankang Kangri (Gangkhar Puensum North, Liangkang Kangri)
- 45：Ngadi Chuli South
