= Banihal Tunnel =

Banihal Tunnel may refer to:

- Jawahar Tunnel
- Pir Panjal Railway Tunnel
