= Banihal Qazigund Road Tunnel =

Road tunnel in Jammu and Kashmir, India

- Interactive map of Banihal Qazigund Road Tunnel

Overview
- Location: Jammu and Kashmir, India
- Status: Active
- Route: NH 44
- Start: Qazigund
- End: Banihal

Operation
- Work began: 2011
- Opened: 4 August 2021
- Owner: National Highways Authority of India
- Operator: National Highways Authority of India
- Traffic: Automotive
- Toll: Qazigund Toll Plaza

Technical
- Length: 8.45 km (27,700 ft)
- No. of lanes: 2 Lanes per Tube (4 Lanes total in Twin-Tube with Dual carriageway)
- Operating speed: 70 km/h (43 mph)
- Max elevation: 1,790 m (5,870 ft)
- Width: 7 metres (23 ft)

Banihal Qazigund Road Tunnel is a 8.45-kilometre-long (5.25 mi) road tunnel connecting Banihal and Qazigund, thus helping in bypassing the Banihal Pass in the Pir Panjal mountain range in lower Himalayas. It is a Twin-Tube tunnel, carrying four lanes of National Highway 44 at an elevation of 1,790 m (5,870 ft). It also reduces the travel time between the cities of Srinagar and Jammu from 6 hours to 5.5 hours.

The tunnel consists of two parallel tunnels, one for each direction of travel. Each tunnel is 7 m (23 ft) wide, and each has two lanes of road. The two tunnels are interconnected by a passage every 500 m (1,600 ft) for maintenance and emergency evacuation. The tunnel has forced ventilation to extract smoke and stale air and infuse fresh air. It has state-of-the-art monitoring and control systems for security. Built at a cost of ₹2,100 crore, citizens pay a toll to use the tunnel.

== Construction ==
Construction of the tunnel started in 2011 along with the project to widen NH 44 (which was known as NH 1A before all the national highways were renumbered in the year 2010) to four lanes. The existing road tunnel below the Banihal pass (Jawahar tunnel), has been a bottleneck on the road due to its elevation of 2,194 m (7,198 ft) and limited traffic capacity. The new tunnel's average elevation at 1,790 m is 400 m lower than the existing Jawahar tunnel's elevation, making it less prone to avalanches. The tunnel has reduced the road distance between Banihal and Qazigund by 16 km (10 mile).

- As of May 2016, 7.2 km of the 8.5 km had been excavated.
- As of February 2017, the tunnel excavation was close to completion.
- February 2018: Boring work of one tunnel had been completed.
- May 2018: Boring of the entire 8.5 km tunnel was completed on 20 May 2018.
- January 2019:Tunnel may open for traffic by March 2020.
- November 2019: Work progressing at slow pace; tunnel to be opened for traffic in March 2021.
- 25 February 2021:Tunnel likely to open for traffic in April 2021
- 5 April 2021: opening delayed until end of April 2021.
- July 2021: Tunnel could be inaugurated on the independence day by Prime Minister Narendra Modi.
- August 2021: Tunnel was opened by the Road Transport and Highways Minister, Nitin Gadkari.

== Location ==
The Southern portal (end) of the tunnel is at 33.4895°N 75.1729°E and the Northern portal (end) of the tunnel is at 33.5646°N 75.1867°E.

== Safety measures ==
The tunnel is made on build–operate–transfer basis. It is built with an exhaust system to remove gas and bring in fresh air. It has 126 jet fans, 234 CCTV cameras and a firefighting system installed.

== See also ==
- Tunnels in North West India
- NH 44 (former name NH 1A before renumbering of all national highways)
