= Gulbugh =

Village in an Indian state

Gulbugh is a small village 10 km from the district seat of Pulwama in Jammu and Kashmir, India. The population is around 700. A stream called Naalah Laar divides the village in two parts.The village has two jamia masjid, Markazi jamia masjid and jamia masjid umer i Farooq(ra) . Gulbugh has one govt middle school

The railway line from Baramulla to Banihal divides the village in two parts (residential area and agricultural fields). The literacy rate is less as compared to other villages. The most common occupation is farming. About 90% of population depends on agriculture. The villagers has lack of clean water as they use the water of stream without filtering. Here seems to be no end to the clean water crisis. This is the only village in block kakapora where public transport is not available

Gulbugh suffered major damage as the result of flooding in 2014.it is about 4 km from Kakapora
