= Lallan =

Village in Jammu and Kashmir, India

Lallan is a village located in the Anantnag Tehsil of Anantnag district in Jammu and Kashmir, India. Situated on the bank of Nallah Bringhi, it is about 3.5 kilometres away from main town Anantnag with Ganoora village on the west, Chichiripora village on the east, Monghall village on the south and Sadoora village on the North. It can be reached from National Highway which is about 03 kilometres via Furrah-Mirbazar. This village has a shrine of famous Saint Syed Jaffar(RA). This village is known for its prime location and area. The Railway line passes from the west side of village before reaching Sadura Railway Station and bisects two villages Lallan and Ganoora. People in this village are Muslims.
