= Bainch Baja =

- village
- Location in Punjab, India Bainch Baja (India)
- Coordinates: 31.645362°N 75.679704°E
- Country: India
- State: Punjab
- District: Hoshiarpur

Languages
  - Official: Punjabi
- Time zone: UTC+5:30 (IST)
- Vehicle registration: PB-

Bainch Baja is a village in the Hoshiarpur district of Punjab, India. It is located five kilometers from the National Highway 1A.

It has a population of around 5000, with some 3500 people on the electoral roll. It is administered by Panchayat raj.
