= Hardu Shichan =

Village in Jammu and Kashmir, India

Hardu Shichan also known as Harde Sitsan (ہَردٕ سٕژَن) is a village in Anantnag tehsil (Anantanag sub district) in Anantnag district in Jammu and Kashmir, India. It is one of 105 villages in Anantnag block along with villages like Peth Bugh and Dialgam.

== Demographics ==
According to 2011 census of India, Hardu Shichan has a population of 3,894; 1,983 are male and 1,911 female.

Educational institutions:

1. Balmy School Hardu Schichan.

2. Govt Girls Middle School Hardu Schichan

Rivers

1.Brengi

Adjacent villages:

Dialgam , Pethbugh, Brinty, Sadura, Farm

Nearby Institutions:

1.Govt Medical College Anantnag.

2.Govt polytechnic college Anantnag.
