= Bringhi =

Bringhi may refer to:

- Bringhi River, a river in Jammu and Kashmir, India
- Bringhi (ship), an Egyptian ship sunk in 1942 in World War II
- Bringhe, a rice dish from the Philippines
