= Haji Danter =

Haji (Hanji) Danter is a village in Anantnag tehsil in Anantnag district in Jammu and Kashmir, India in the disputed Kashmir region. It is adjacent to Anantnag town, just 1.5 km away from Lalchowk Anantnag and nearest village to District Headquarters. The approaches to the village are through Achabal Adda, Khanabal chowk and Naid Khunoo Harnaag. The village is surrounded by all the three main tributaries of River Jhelum of Kashmir, The Brengi, The Aarpath, The Saandran. The village used to be main business hub in early times, because of developed water transport. The place has a port in its surroundings called Ghaat-e- Pushwara. The place had the first automatic hydel grinding machine called jindra, where people from far away places used to come to get their rice, wheat and spices ground.

According to the 2011 census, the village has a population of around 2048 and has highest literacy rate among the areas surrounding it. The area is surrounded by rivers on all sides due to which it is frequently hit by floods. The main religion of the people is Islam.

== Demographics ==
Kashmiri is the local language of the area. People, however, also speak Urdu and Hindi. The place has a population of about 2048 as per data provided by the 2011 census and has a literacy rate of more than 95%. The area shares boundaries with Khanabal, Harnag, etc.

== See also ==
- Doru shahabad
- Khanabal
- Chowgam
- Awantipora
- Kulgam District
- Fatehpora
