= Banihal =

- Town
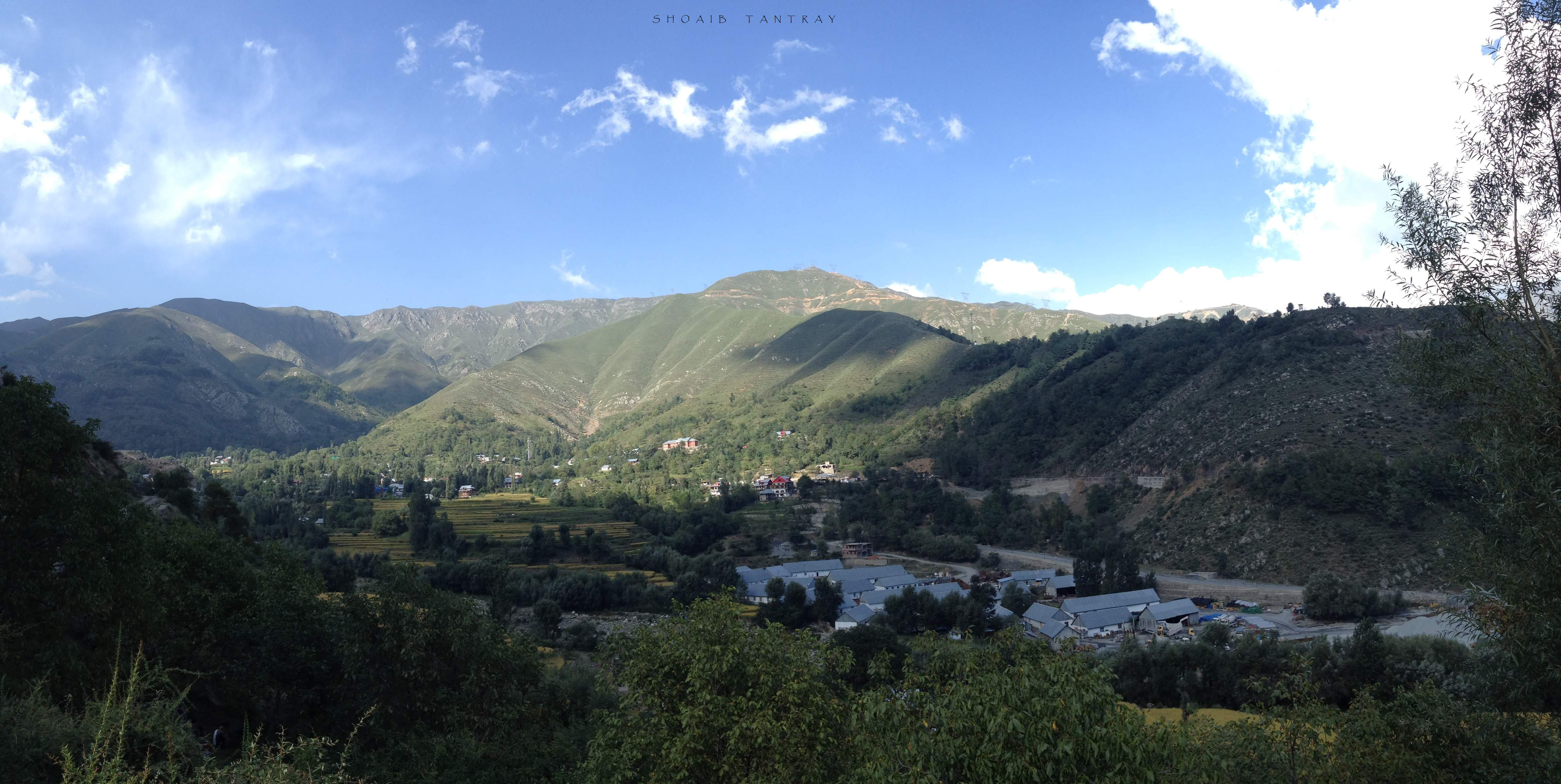
- Banihal Pass in Ramban district (J&K)

- Location in Jammu and Kashmir, India Banihal (India)
- Coordinates: 33.42°N 75.2°E
- Country: India
- Union Territory: Jammu and Kashmir
- Division: Jammu
- Region: Chenab Valley
- District: Ramban
- Elevation: 1,647 m (5,404 ft)

Population (2011)
  - Total: 3,900

Languages
  - Official: Kashmiri, Urdu, Hindi, Dogri, English
  - Spoken: Kashmiri
- Time zone: UTC+5:30 (ISTfrr)
- Pincode: 182146
- Vehicle registration: JK-19
- Website: ramban.gov.in

Banihal is a town and a notified area committee, near Ramban town in Ramban district in the Indian union territory of Jammu and Kashmir in the disputed Kashmir region. It is a rural and hilly area with Kamirwah being one of the most prominent hills. It is located about 35 km (22 mi) away from Qazigund of Anantnag district on NH 44. However, the distance between Banihal and Qazigund is only 18 km by train on the new railway line which is much shorter than the road. The most common language spoken in the region is Kashmiri.

== Etymology ==
"Banihal" means blizzard in the Kashmiri language.
Another view regarding the origin of the name of the place is that the word 'Banihal' has actually been derived from two Kashmiri words viz 'bah' meaning twelve and 'nallhe' meaning a rivulet. Twelve rivulets signifying the various brooks flowing through the area and eventually joining the small local river called Nalla Bischlari.
There is yet another school of thought amongst the locals and some scholars in which the word Banihal is thought of as having a Persian origin. "Nihal" in Persian means greenery and hence "Banihal" would imply 'Eternally green'
In some older texts, it has also been referred to as 'Devgol', meaning the abode of the Gods.

== Banihal Pass ==
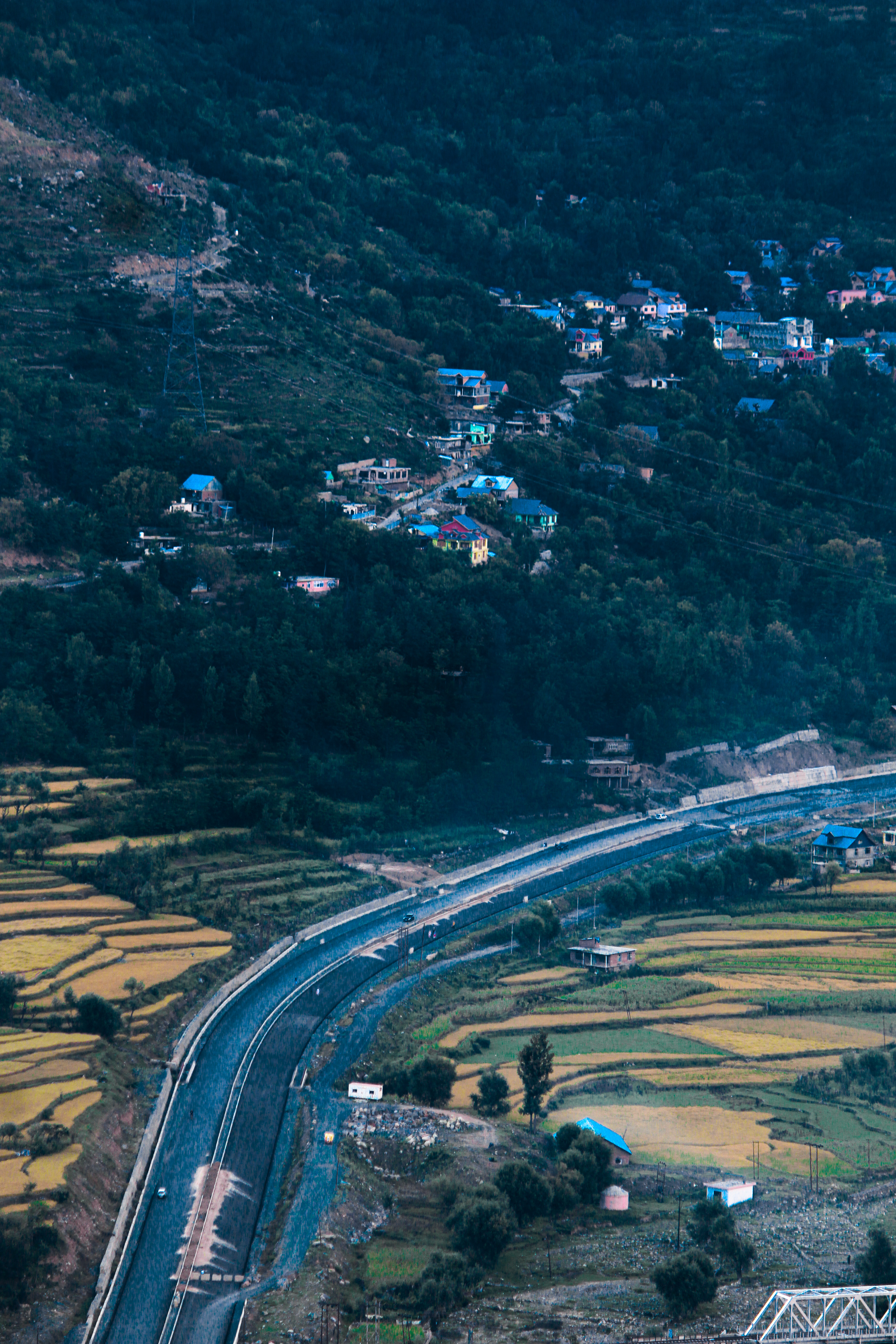
Banihal Pass Top View

Banihal Pass is a mountain pass. At 2,832 m (9,291 ft) elevation, the Pir Panjal mountains connect Banihal with Qazigund on the other side of the mountains. The Pir Panjal mountain range separates the Kashmir valley in the Indian state Jammu and Kashmir from the outer Himalaya and plains to the south. After the closure of the Murree-Muzaffarabad-Srinagar road on the partition of India in 1947, Banihal pass was the only passage from Jammu to Srinagar after independence until 1956 when Jawahar Tunnel was bored through the Pir Panjal range. The pass is accessible only in summer and in winters also if there is no heavy snowfall. If there is heavy snowfall during winters the roads are closed for few days until the snow is cleared from the highway.

== Demographics ==
Religion in Banihal Town (2011)
1. Islam (71.5%)
2. Hinduism (27.5%)
3. Sikhism (0.67%)
4. Christianity (0.23%)
5. Not Stated (0.10%)

As of 2011 India census, Banihal had a population of 3,900 of which 2,453 (57%) are males while 1,447 (43%) are females. Banihal has an average literacy rate of 68%, higher than the Indian national average of 59.5%; with 66% of the males and 34% of females literate. 12% of the population is under 6 years of age. The population of children ages 0–6 is 388 which is 9.95% of the total population. In Banihal Municipal Committee, the Female Sex Ratio is 590 against the state average of 889. Moreover, the Child Sex Ratio in Banihal is around 902 compared to the Jammu and Kashmir state average of 862. The literacy rate of Banihal city is 83.77% higher than the state average of 67.16%. In Banihal, Male literacy is around 91.33% while the female literacy rate is 70.31%. Banihal has an overwhelmingly majority Muslim population with a minority of Hindus and Sikhs.

== Administrative Divisions ==
Banihal Tehsil consists of three Naibats: Naibat Tethar (Area 45 square kilometres), Naibat Banihal (Area 85 Square kilometres), Naibat Chambalwas (Area 25 square kilometres)

The total agricultural land in Tethar Naibat is 10.68 square kilometres in which the total irrigated (Aabi Awal Land) is 3.14 square kilometres and the total maize or walnut orchids land is 7.54 square kilometres.

In Banihal Naibat the total agricultural land is 11.48 square kilometres in which the total irrigated (Aabi Awal land) is 3.97 square kilometres and the total maize or walnut orchids land is 7.44 square kilometres.

in Chambalwas Naibat The total agricultural land is 3.87 square kilometres in which the total irrigated (Aabi Awal land) is 0.37 square kilometres and the total maize or walnut orchids land is 3.50 square kilometres.

Linguistic breakdown of Naibats:

Naibat Tethar : Kashmiri:95% of total population. and the rest 5% are Gojri speaking.

Naibat Banihal: Kashmiri: 85% Gojri:11% Khah/Pogli dialect:4%

Naibat Chambalwas: Kashmiri:15% Khah/Pogli dialect:68% Gojri:17%

Reference:Wadia Chenab Tehzeeb o Saqafat (وادی چناب تہذیب و ثقافت) by Shabir Hussain Shabir

Banihal town has 645 houses and is divided into seven electoral wards.

== Banihal Road Tunnels ==
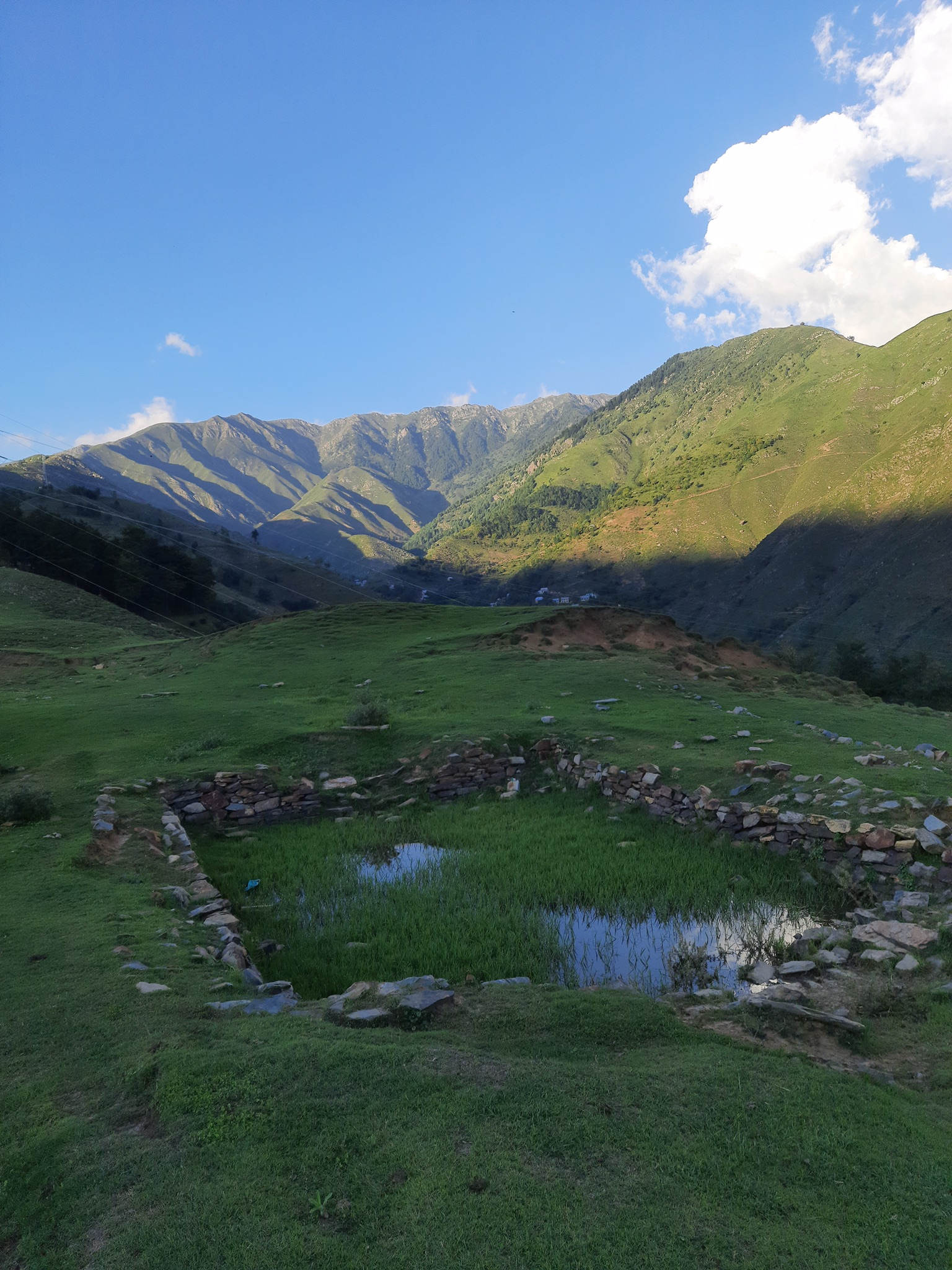
Chanjloo, Banihal.

=== Existing road tunnel ===
A 2.5-kilometre-long (1.6 mi) tunnel at elevation of 2,194 m (7,198 ft) through Pir Panjal mountain under the Banihal pass connects Banihal with Qazigund on the other side of the mountain. The tunnel named Jawahar tunnel after the first prime minister of India was constructed in early 1950s and commissioned in December 1956 to ensure snow-free passage throughout the year. However, it remains closed for a few weeks in winter due to snow avalanches. It was designed for 150 vehicles per day in either direction but now used by more than 7,000 vehicles per day in both directions. Therefore, a new wider and longer tunnel has been planned at a lower elevation.

Jawahar tunnel is maintained by Border Road Organisation (BRO) of the Indian army and guarded 24x7 by the CRPF (Central Reserve Police Force), which also monitors it by CCTVs as the tunnel is vital for the Kashmir valley. The tunnel used to be closed to civilian traffic from midnight to 08:00 until 2009. Now it is open 24 hours a day.

=== Banihal Qazigund Road Tunnel ===
Construction of a new 8.45-kilometre-long (5.25 mi) Banihal Qazigund Road Tunnel started in 2011 to widen NH 44 (former name NH 1A before renumbering of all national highways) to four lanes. It is a double tube tunnel consisting of two parallel tunnels – one for each direction of travel. Each tunnel is 7 metres wide and has two lanes of the road. The two tunnels are interconnected by a passage every 500 metres for maintenance and emergency evacuation. The tunnel has forced ventilation for extracting smoke and stale air and infusing fresh air. It has state of the art monitoring and control systems for security.

The new tunnel's average elevation at 1,790 m is 400 m lower than the existing Jawahar tunnel's elevation and has reduced the road distance between Banihal and Qazigund by 30 km. The new tunnel is also less prone to snow avalanches as it is at a lower elevation. The vehicles have to pay toll tax to use the tunnel. The Southern portal (end) of the tunnel is at 33.4895°N 75.1729°E and the Northern portal (end) of the tunnel is at 33.5646°N 75.1867°E.

The boring of the entire 8.5 km tunnel was completed on 20 May 2018. The tunnel was inaugurated on 24 April 2022.

== Qazigund Rail Tunnel ==
A new 11.215 km (7 miles) long Banihal-Qazigund tunnel (also known as Pir Panjal railway tunnel) for the Jammu–Baramulla line connecting Bichleri Valley of Banihal with Qazigund area of Kashmir Valley has been constructed. The tunnel is 8.40 m wide with a height of 7.39 m. There is a three-metre-wide (9.8 ft) road along the length of the tunnel for the maintenance of railway tracks and emergency relief. The boring was completed in October 2011, its lining and laying of rail tracks were completed in the next year and a trial run commenced at the end of 2012. Commercial runs started from 27 June 2013 reducing the distance between Quazigund and Banihal by 17 km (from 35 km by road to 17.5 km by train).

The tunnel's average elevation at 1,760 m (5,770 ft) is 440 m (1,440 ft) below the existing road tunnel. The rail tunnel facilitates transportation during winters when inclement weather forces closure of the road tunnel and Srinagar-Jammu highway. Pir Panjal Railway Tunnel is India's longest and Asia's third longest railway tunnel (28 km long Taihang Tunnel in China is the longest and 21 km long Wushaoling Tunnel in Gansu, China is the second longest).

The north portal of the Banihal railway tunnel is at 33.5617942°N 75.1988626°E and the south portal is at 33.463203°N 75.193992°E.

== Banihal railway station ==
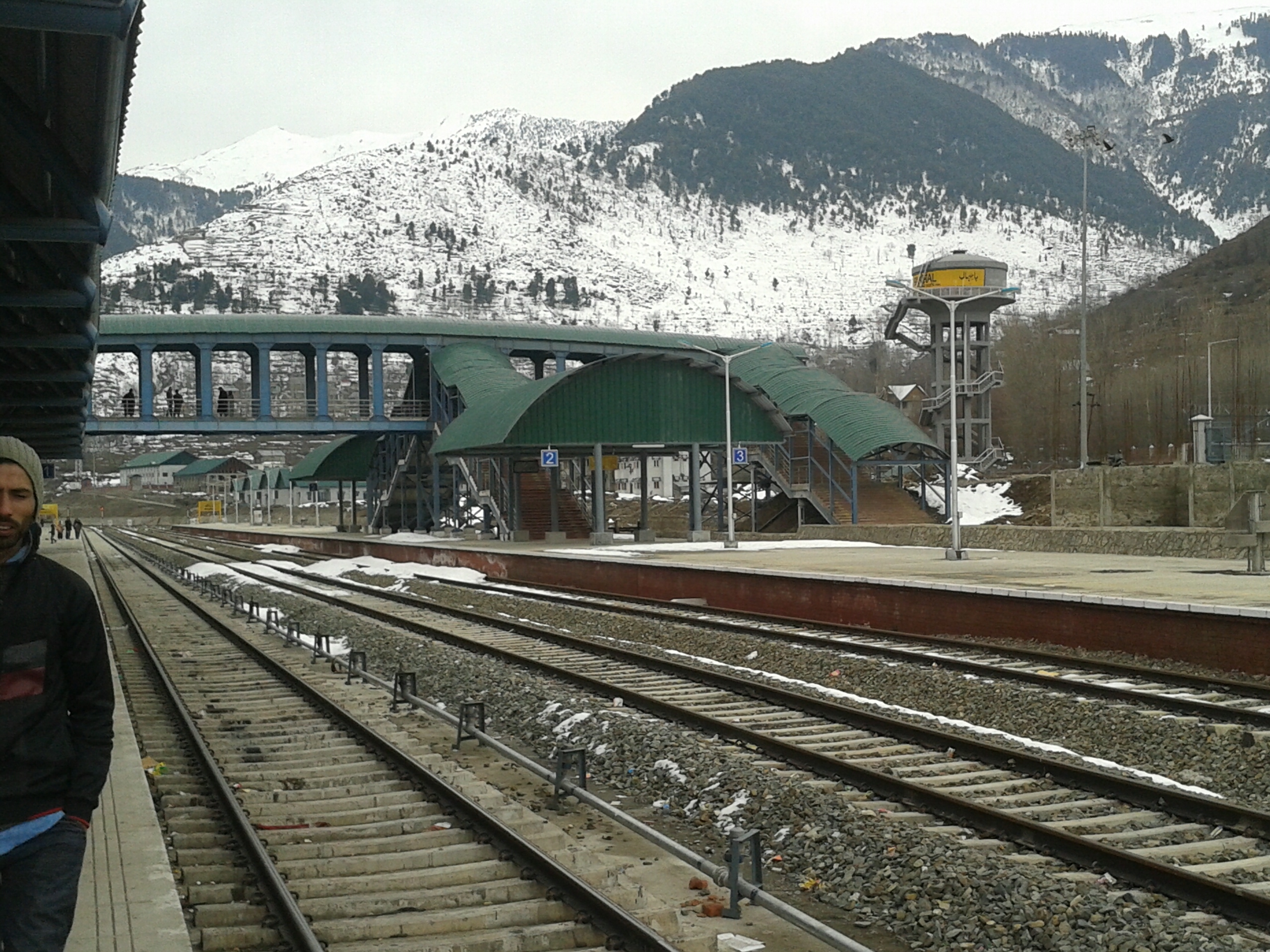
Banihal railway station (2014)

Banihal railway station is situated at 1,702 m (5,584 ft) above mean sea level. It was commissioned on 26 June 2013 and passenger trains run from Banihal to Budgam. The railway network in Kashmir from Banihal to Baramulla is now 137 km. Five trains run daily from Banihal to Baramulla. Until the 148 km Katra-Banihal section of Jammu–Baramulla line gets constructed, expected to be completed by 2018, people can travel from Jammu Tawi or Udhampur to Banihal by road and take the train from Banihal to Srinagar. The train service from Banihal To Budgam was stopped on 5 August 2019 after the Abrogation of Article 35A, and it has not been resumed for the normal commuters since then it was only resumed once with 4 coaches for a special documentary shoot. Indian Railways resumed train operations in Kashmir valley on Banihal-Baramulla section from 22 February 2021, with two services operating initially.

== Historical references ==
According to the Rajatarangini (C-1000-1011 AD) – a chronicle that recorded the history of Kashmir and its Kingdoms and Kings, Banihal was known as 'Vishalta' in the 11th century and was a very narrow mountain valley which was used as an escape route by revolting Princes, rebel Chieftains, and even conspirators from Kashmir.

Banihal is the metamorphosed form of ancient Banashala, an appellation that was in vogue even in the time of Kalhan Pandit (1128 to 1149 CE) who was the first historian to have written the most authentic historical account of Kashmir in his celebrated "Raj Tarangini". He mentions that this mountain pass in Pir Panchal range connecting Shahabad pargana in north to the town in its south(now called Banihal) bore the same name. In 1130 AD, when Jayasimha was the ruler of Kashmir, Bikshachar nicknamed Bhikshu, took refuge in the castle of Banashala which was held by the then Khasa Chief. The castle itself had been besieged by the Royal troops who flung stones from catapults and showered arrows on the castle. In retaliation Bikshachar and his men rolled down stones/boulders from the castle on the Royal troops. Ultimately he was betrayed by the Khasa lords and killed by Jayasimha's men.

In the 11th century, a small fort called 'Bansalla' also existed below the old Banihal Pass. The Bansalla Fort belonged to the 11th century ruler of Vishalta the Khasa Lord Bhagika who was the son-in-law of the Lord of Buddha Tikka.

Pandit Sahib Ram, who in his book "Tirthas" copies Abu'l-Fazl ibn Mubarak's notes, metamorphosizes the Sanskrit name of village Banihal from Bhanusita or Bhanusata, i.e., rocks of the Sun or land of the Sun.

Aurel Stein on his commentary on Kalhana's Rajatarangini describes the place differently. According to him, Visalata or Banihal must be identified with the valley drained by rivulet Bischlari.

== Climate ==
Climate data for Banihal, elevation 1,624 m (5,328 ft), (1991–2020, extremes 1962–2020)
Month	Jan	Feb	Mar	Apr	May	Jun	Jul	Aug	Sep	Oct	Nov	Dec	Year
Record high °C (°F)	22.6 (72.7)	26.0 (78.8)	29.0 (84.2)	31.8 (89.2)	35.2 (95.4)	36.3 (97.3)	34.8 (94.6)	33.2 (91.8)	33.0 (91.4)	32.0 (89.6)	27.9 (82.2)	23.8 (74.8)	36.3 (97.3)
Mean daily maximum °C (°F)	10.8 (51.4)	12.5 (54.5)	17.2 (63.0)	22.4 (72.3)	26.2 (79.2)	28.6 (83.5)	28.7 (83.7)	28.2 (82.8)	27.6 (81.7)	24.6 (76.3)	19.4 (66.9)	14.7 (58.5)	21.9 (71.4)
Mean daily minimum °C (°F)	0.0 (32.0)	1.8 (35.2)	5.0 (41.0)	8.6 (47.5)	11.5 (52.7)	14.6 (58.3)	17.8 (64.0)	17.4 (63.3)	13.2 (55.8)	7.2 (45.0)	3.8 (38.8)	1.8 (35.2)	8.7 (47.7)
Record low °C (°F)	−12.0 (10.4)	−10.0 (14.0)	−6.4 (20.5)	−0.7 (30.7)	3.0 (37.4)	6.3 (43.3)	10.3 (50.5)	8.7 (47.7)	5.1 (41.2)	0.8 (33.4)	−2.4 (27.7)	−13.6 (7.5)	−13.6 (7.5)
Average rainfall mm (inches)	192.2 (7.57)	237.1 (9.33)	224.1 (8.82)	132.3 (5.21)	82.9 (3.26)	67.9 (2.67)	83.8 (3.30)	99.4 (3.91)	68.4 (2.69)	34.8 (1.37)	54.3 (2.14)	87.7 (3.45)	1,364.8 (53.73)
Average rainy days	7.3	8.5	9.1	8.1	7.1	5.4	6.1	6.2	4.1	2.3	2.6	3.9	70.6
Average relative humidity (%) (at 17:30 IST)	55	55	50	48	49	51	62	66	60	50	46	47	53
Source: India Meteorological Department

== Gallery ==
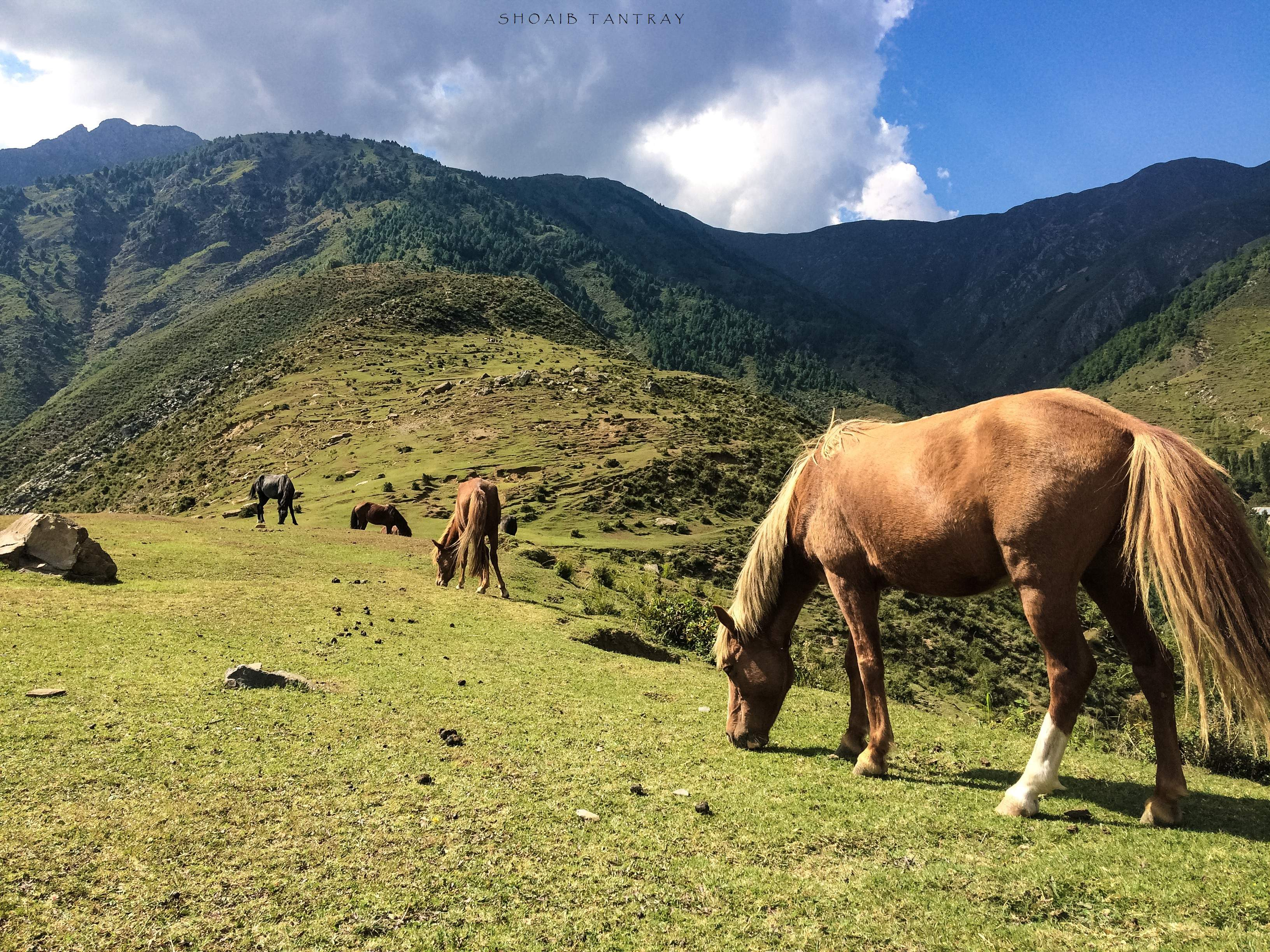
Tanjmaidan, Khairkoot

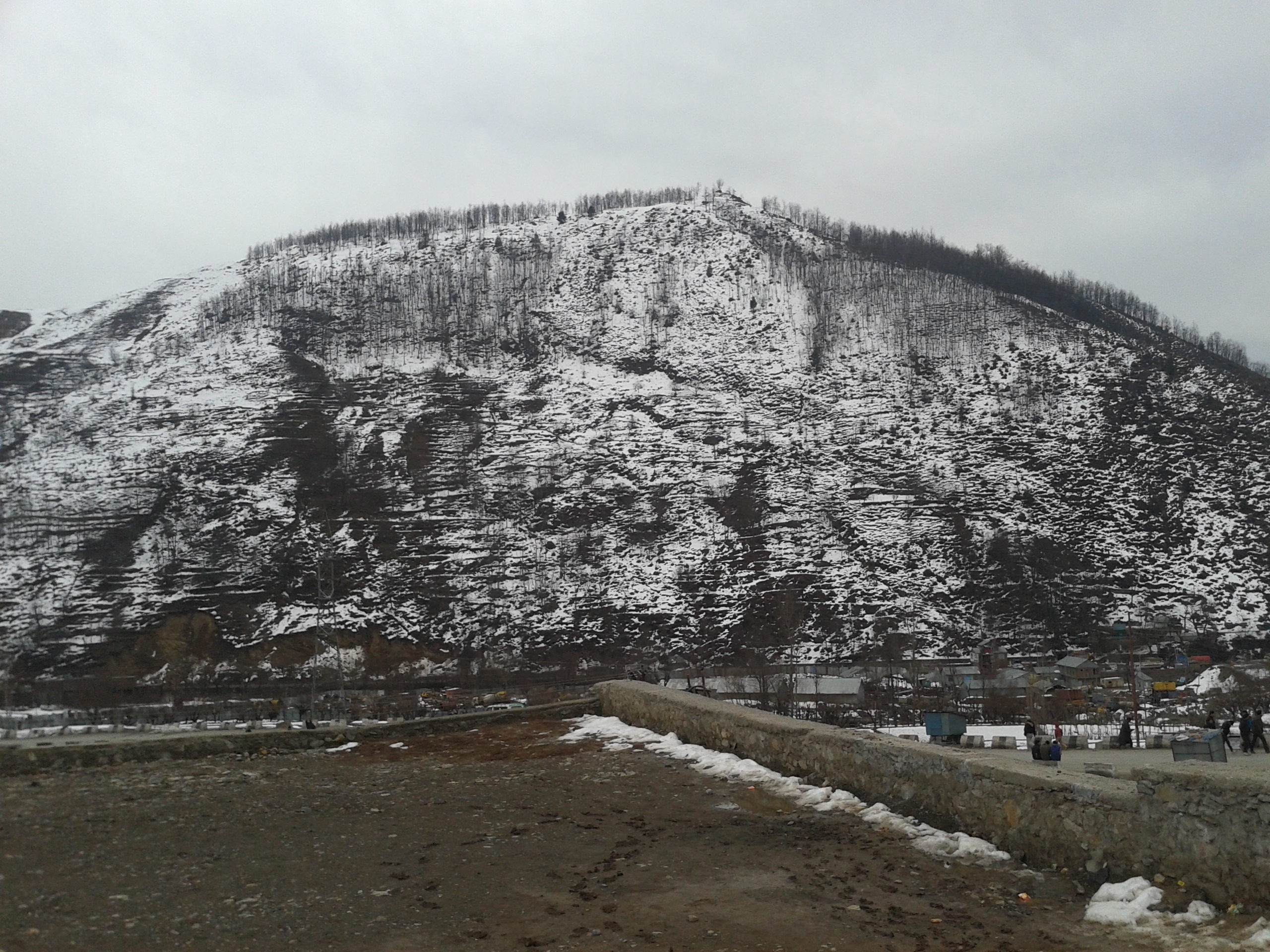
Hill named Kamirwah in Banihal town (photograph taken from Banihal railway station)

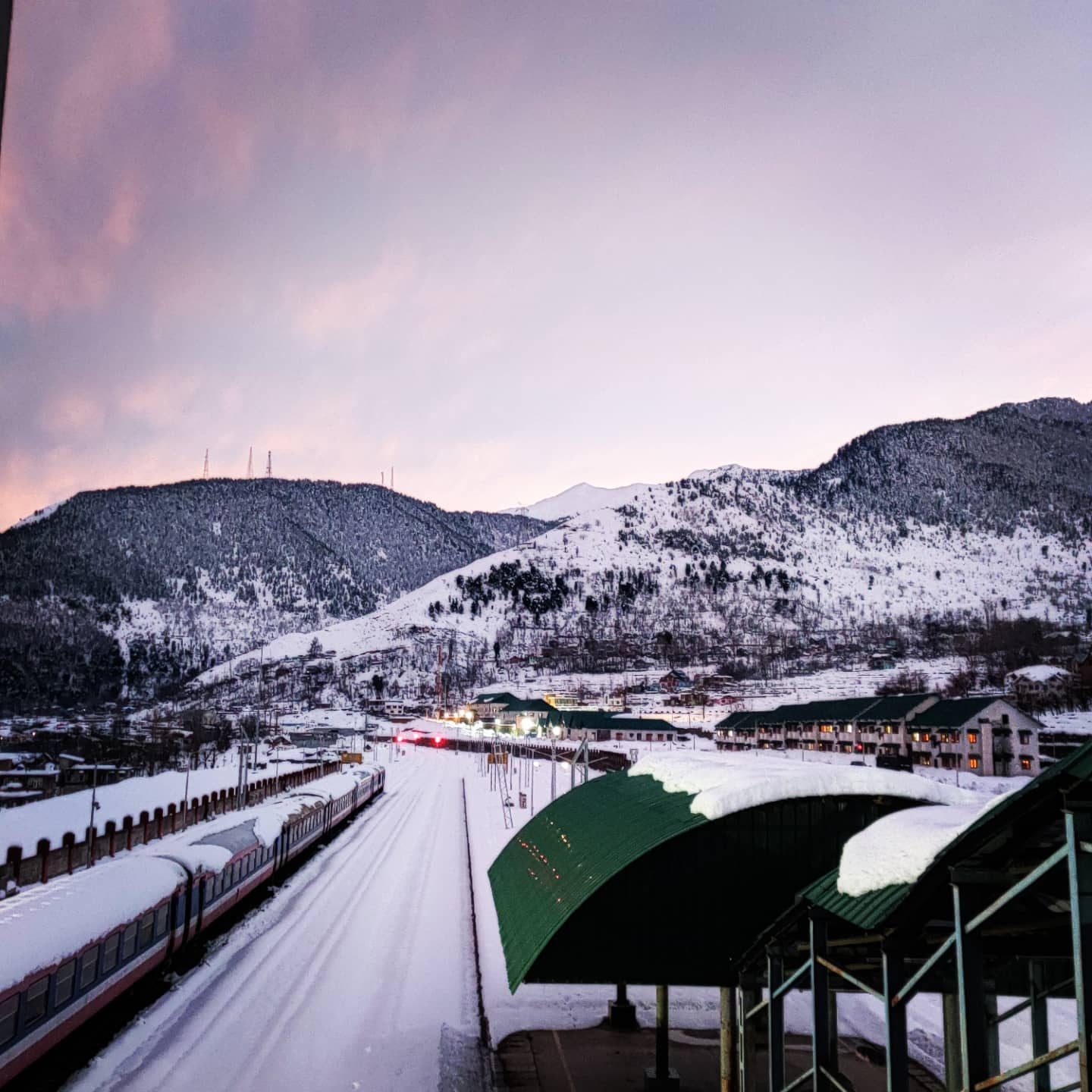

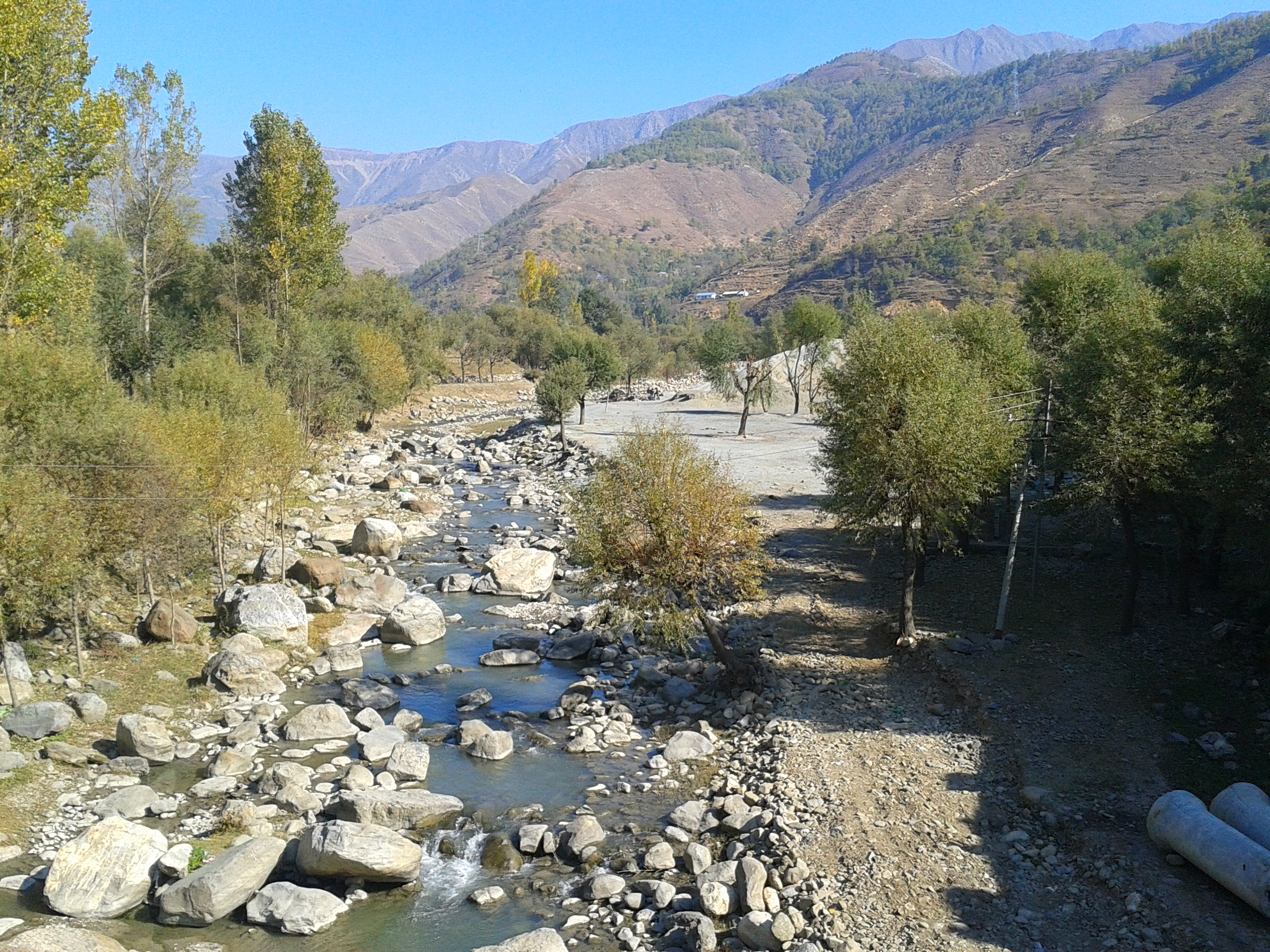
The local Rivulet Bischlari

== Transport ==
=== Road ===
Banihal is very well-connected by road to other places in Jammu and Kashmir and India by the NH 44. The Jawahar Tunnel between Banihal and Qazigund connects the Jammu division with Kashmir division through Banihal. The new Banihal Qazigund Road Tunnel opened in 2021 which shortened the distance between Banihal and Qazigund by 16 kilometres.

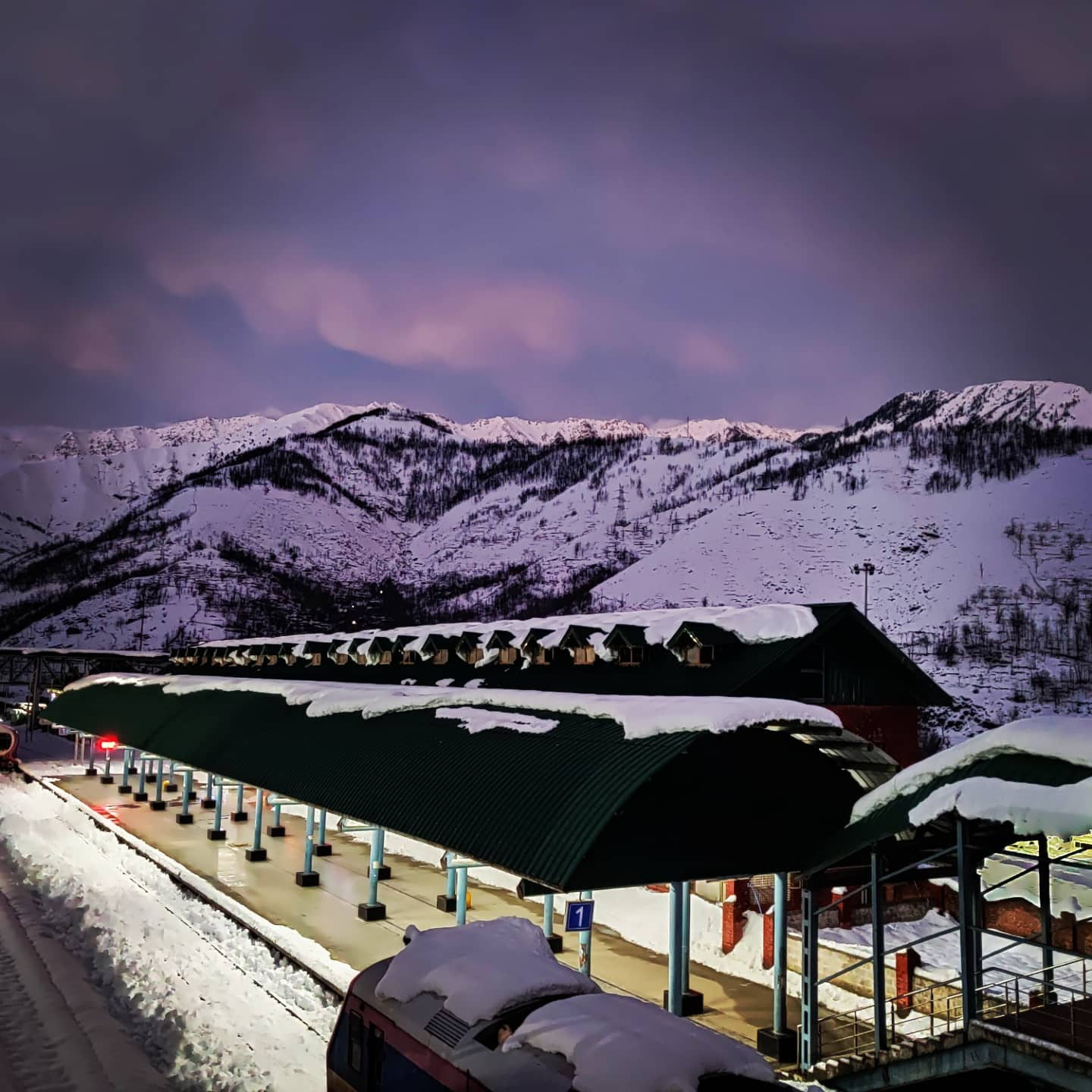
Banihal Railway station in winter.

=== Rail ===
Banihal railway station is located 2 kilometres from the main town. It is part of the Jammu–Baramulla line. The Katra-Banihal section of the Jammu–Baramulla line will be completed by December 2022 which will allow trains from Jammu Tawi to directly reach Banihal and further into Kashmir Valley.

=== Air ===
The nearest airport is Srinagar International Airport located at a distance of 110 kilometres.

== See also ==
- Jammu–Srinagar National Highway
- NH 44
- Banihal Pass
- Verinag
- Anantnag
- Doda
- Nowgam
- Sangaldan
