= Sandran River =

Coordinates: 33°44′N 75°08′E

Sandran
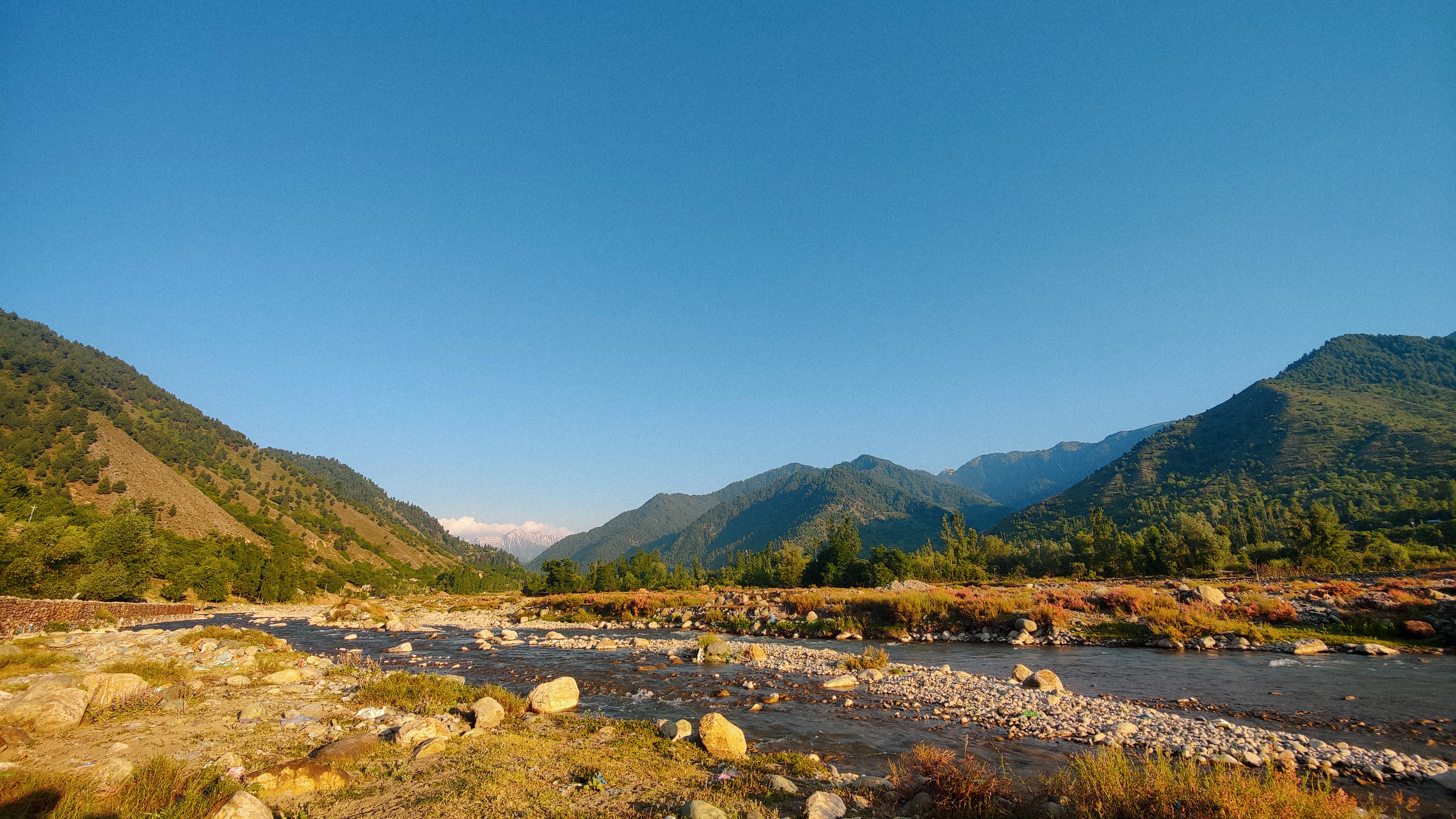
- Sandran River

Location
- Country: India
- State: Jammu and Kashmir
- Region: Kashmir Valley
- District: Anantnag

Physical characteristics
- Mouth
  - location: Jhelum River at Takia Bahram Shah in Khanabal
- Length: 43.50 km

Sandran River takes birth near sarbal pass in the south eastern border areas of Kashmir Valley and flowing to the north west empties into Jhelum River along with Arapath River and Brengi River near Anantnag town. From this point downstream Jhelum River turns into a full-fledged river.

== Course ==
The Sandran river flows into the Jhelum River at Takia Bahram Shah, in Khanabal. It flows through areas such as Dooru Shahabad and Sadura, and covers a distance of 43.50 kilometers. It's village enroute are as follows; Hangipora, Kapran, Thamenkote, Reyan, Chowgund, Nowgam, Gurnar, Panzoo, Bonugund, Chenigund, Dooru, Mehmoodabad, Shankerpore, Vessu, Sadoora, Bumthan, Mulward, Takie Behram shah at Khanabal.
