= Munawar Pass =

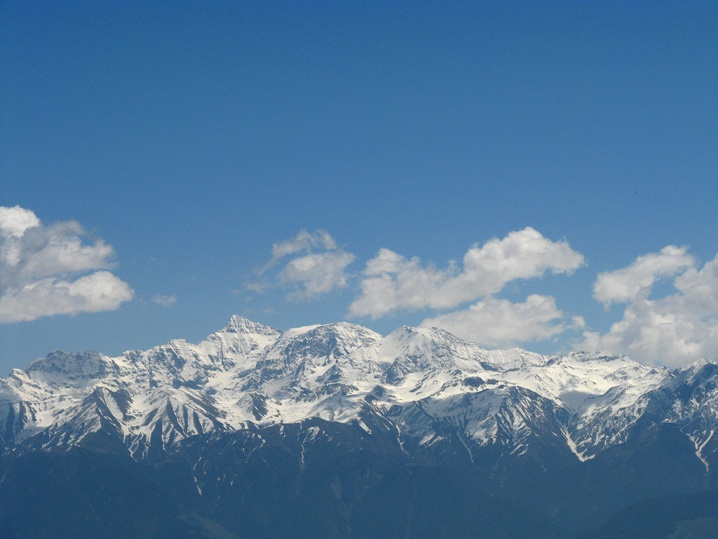
Munawar Pass

Munawar Pass is a 3,600 metres (11,800 ft) high mountain pass located in Pir Panjal Range in Indian-administered union territory of Jammu and Kashmir. It lies in the north of Pir ki Gali and overlooks the town of Rajouri. Munawar Pass witnessed some of the heaviest fighting during Operation Gibraltar in 1965 and was held by a Pakistani guerrilla force under Major Munawar Awan, who had also captured Indian Army Garrison at Rajouri. Munawar and his actions became a folk tale in the area and the pass was named after him by locals, a name it retains to date. He assembled the locals, armed them and established pickets all along the Mehndar-Rajouri area, because of his intense activity with his Ghaznavi Force, a head money worth 1 lakhs by Local Indian Administration was placed on him; however, he managed to escape the Indians and withdrew back into Pakistan with his force at the start of 1965 Indo–Pak war.

== See also ==
- Pir Panjal Range
- Malik Munawar Khan Awan
