= Qazigund =

Town in Jammu and Kashmir, India, also known as gateway of valley Kashmir

- Town
- Location in Jammu and Kashmir, India Qazigund (India)
- Coordinates: 33.592132°N 75.165432°E
- Country: India
- Union Territory: Jammu and Kashmir
- District: Anantnag

Government
  - Body: Municipal Committee
- Elevation: 1,670 m (5,480 ft)

Population (2011)
  - Total: 9,871

Languages
  - Official: Kashmiri, Urdu, Hindi, Dogri, English
- Time zone: UTC+5:30 (IST)
- Postal code: 192221
- Vehicle registration: JK03

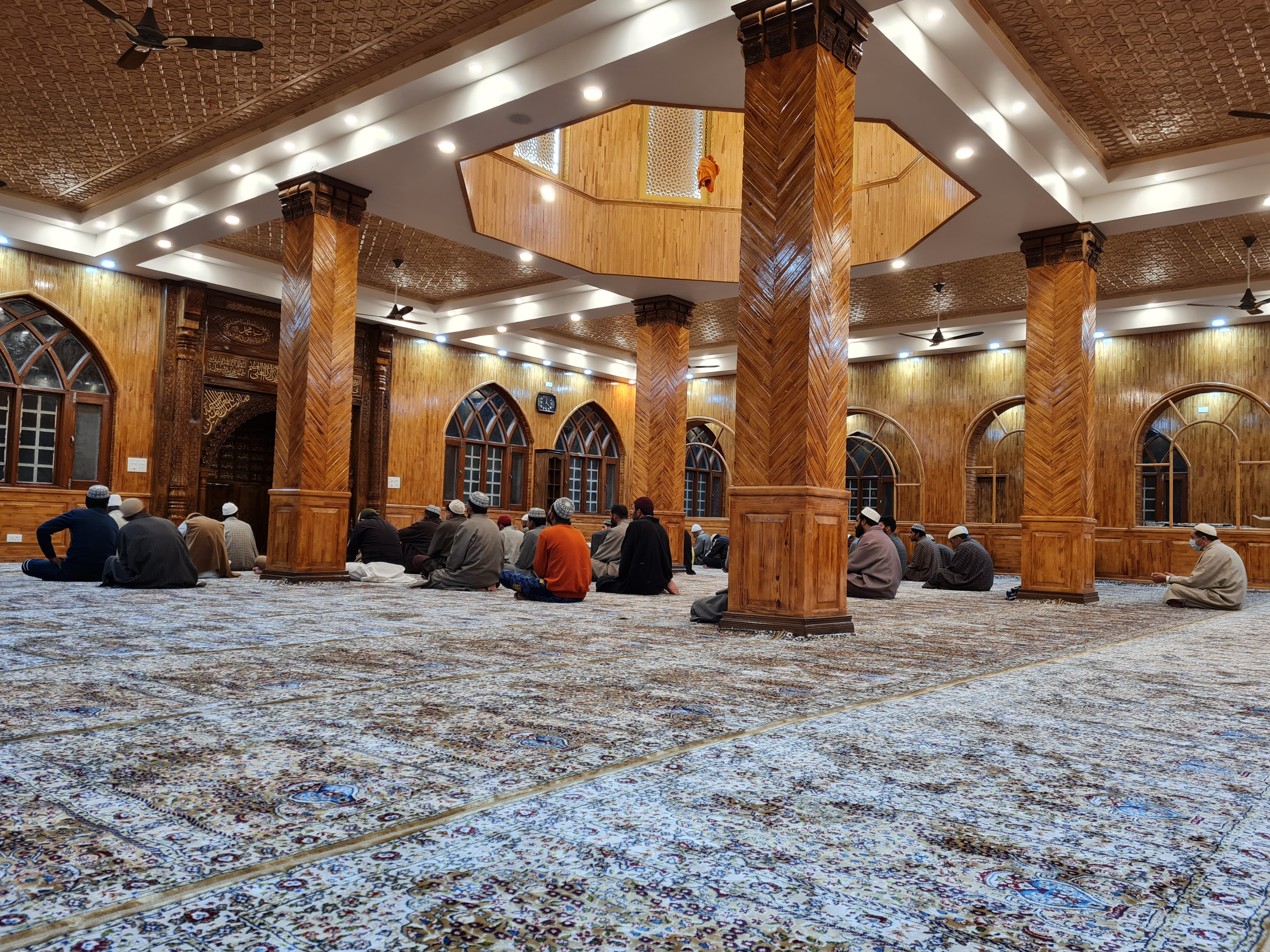
Inside View of Masjid e Al Noor

Qazigund (Urdu pronunciation: [qɑːziː ɡʊnɖ], Kashmiri pronunciation: [qəːzʲ ɡonɖ]), also known as Gateway Of Kashmir, is a town and in the union territory of Jammu and Kashmir, India. Qazigund is located at 33.59°N 75.16°E. It has an average elevation of 1670 m (5478 feet) above mean sea level. Due to its geographically ambiguous location, Qazigund is associated with both Anantnag and Kulgam districts. However, administratively, it falls under Anantnag district.

== Demographics ==
As of 2011 India census, Qazigund had a population of 9871. Males constitute 55% of the population and females 45%. Qazigund has an average literacy rate of 70.21%, higher than the national average of 67.16%, male literacy is 79.82%, and female literacy is 58.27%. One of the oldest schools in Qazigund town is Government Boys' High School Qazigund, located within a reach of 100 metres from Bus stand Qazigund. In Qazigund, 20.67% of the population is under 6 years of age.

== Climate ==
Climate data for Qazigund (1991–2020, extremes 1962–2020)
Month	Jan	Feb	Mar	Apr	May	Jun	Jul	Aug	Sep	Oct	Nov	Dec	Year
Record high °C (°F)	16.2 (61.2)	20.7 (69.3)	26.5 (79.7)	31.4 (88.5)	33.6 (92.5)	35.7 (96.3)	34.5 (94.1)	35.0 (95.0)	32.8 (91.0)	32.2 (90.0)	24.3 (75.7)	18.9 (66.0)	35.7 (96.3)
Mean daily maximum °C (°F)	6.6 (43.9)	9.7 (49.5)	14.8 (58.6)	20.0 (68.0)	23.8 (74.8)	27.0 (80.6)	28.0 (82.4)	27.7 (81.9)	26.1 (79.0)	21.9 (71.4)	15.7 (60.3)	10.0 (50.0)	19.2 (66.6)
Mean daily minimum °C (°F)	−3.1 (26.4)	−0.4 (31.3)	3.0 (37.4)	6.5 (43.7)	9.6 (49.3)	13.5 (56.3)	16.8 (62.2)	16.0 (60.8)	11.2 (52.2)	5.2 (41.4)	1.0 (33.8)	−1.8 (28.8)	6.4 (43.5)
Record low °C (°F)	−15.7 (3.7)	−16.7 (1.9)	−7.5 (18.5)	−1.5 (29.3)	−0.2 (31.6)	7.0 (44.6)	9.4 (48.9)	8.4 (47.1)	4.0 (39.2)	−1.2 (29.8)	−8.2 (17.2)	−14.4 (6.1)	−16.7 (1.9)
Average rainfall mm (inches)	150.9 (5.94)	166.5 (6.56)	173.9 (6.85)	117.0 (4.61)	92.1 (3.63)	79.6 (3.13)	105.8 (4.17)	100.7 (3.96)	66.0 (2.60)	29.5 (1.16)	48.3 (1.90)	70.2 (2.76)	1,200.5 (47.26)
Average rainy days	7.7	8.2	9.0	8.1	7.5	5.8	6.5	6.2	4.1	2.4	2.8	3.9	72.2
Average relative humidity (%) (at 17:30 IST)	70	63	55	54	55	54	63	66	60	54	58	66	60
Source: India Meteorological Department

== Transport ==
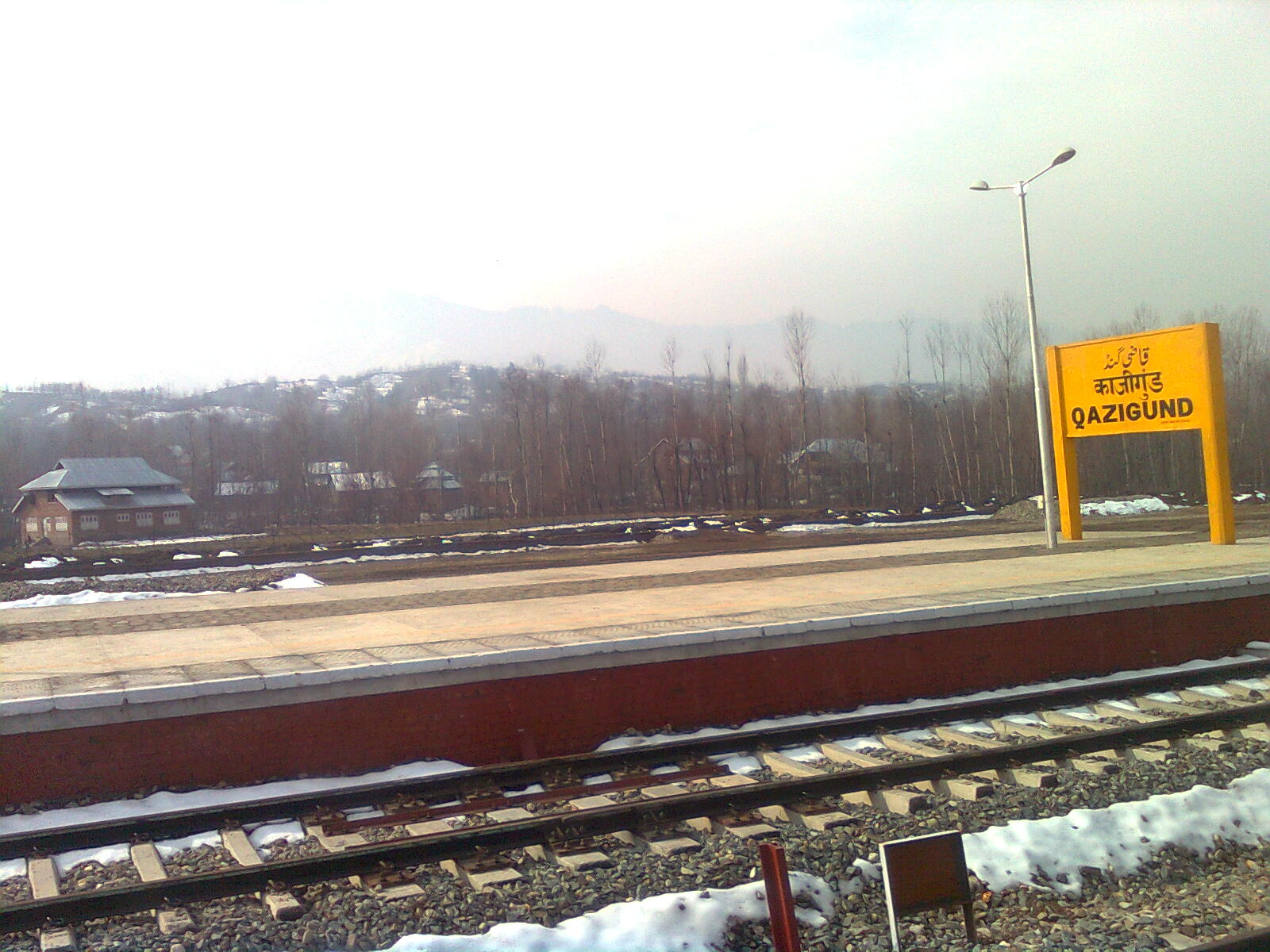
Qazigund Railway Station

Qazigund is connected to Anantnag and Srinagar by road and railway. There is a train service from Qazigund to Srinagar ten times a day, and is connected to Kulgam by road. Qazigund is connected to Jammu and rest of India through NH 44 (former name NH 1A before renumbering of all national highways) that passes through Qazigund Tunnel of Pir Panjal mountain. New NH444 connects Qazigund to Srinagar via Shupiyan.

== Qazigund railway tunnel ==
Qazigund railway tunnel or Pir Panjal Railway Tunnel, is 11 km long railway tunnel under the Pir Panjal mountains to connect Qazigund railway station to Banihal railway station. It was bored in late 2011, became operational by 26 December 2012 and was commissioned in June 2013. It is India's longest and Asia's third longest railway tunnel and reduced the distance between Qazigund and Banihal to only 11 km.

== See also ==
- Chowgam
- Akingam
- Anantnag
- Banihal Qazigund Road Tunnel
- Doru Shahabad
- Fatehpora
- NH 44
- Pulwama
