= Pal Pora =

- Village
- Country: India
- Union territory: Jammu and Kashmir
- District: Anantnag
- Subdistrict: Anantnag

Area
  - Total: 0.538 km^{2} (0.208 sq mi)

Population (2011)
  - Total: 895
- Time zone: UTC+05:30 (IST)

Pal Pora is a village in Anantnag tehsil in Anantnag district in the Indian union territory of Jammu and Kashmir. It is one of 86 villages in Anantnag block along with villages like Fatehpora and Brenti Bat Pora. The population was 895 at the 2011 Indian census.
