= Qazigund railway station =

Railway station in Qazigund, Kulgam

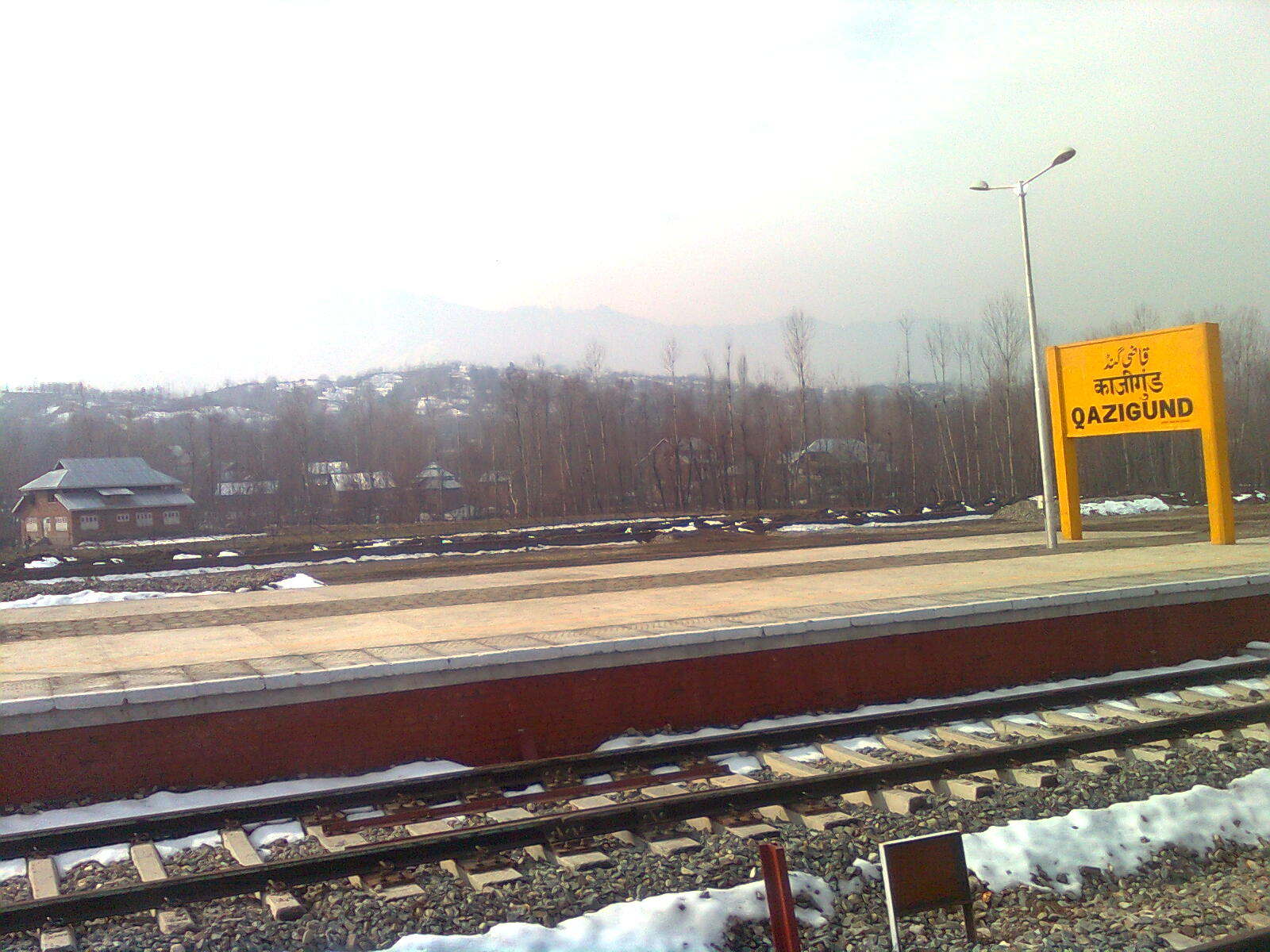
- Platform and sign of Qazigund station in Qazigund, J&K, India

General information
- Location: Qazigund, Jammu and Kashmir, India
- Coordinates: 33.5886°N 75.1580°E
- Elevation: 1,722.165 m (5,650.15 ft)
- System: Indian Railways station
- Line: Northern railway
- Platforms: 2
- Tracks: 3

Construction
- Structure type: Standard on-ground station
- Parking: Yes

Other information
- Status: Active
- Station code: QG
- Zone(s): Northern Railway
- Division(s): Jammu

History
- Opened: 2008
Location

Qazigund railway station lies on Northern Railway network zone of Indian Railways. It is located in Qazigund Jammu and Kashmir, India. It is the main transport hub for the people of Qazigund.

== Location ==
The station is situated near Qazigund town in Kulgam district, Jammu and Kashmir.

== History ==
The station has been built as part of the Jammu–Baramulla line megaproject, intending to link the Kashmir Valley with Jammu Tawi and the Indian railway network. On the inauguration day former PM of India, Manmohan Singh and Sonia Gandhi enjoyed the 12-minute ride to Qazigund with 100 students, mostly girls, of the Banihal Higher Secondary School, and made the 17.8-km ride back to Banihal, passing through the tunnel, the second longest in Asia. Those who accompanied them were Governor N.N. Vohra, Chief Minister Omar Abdullah, Railway Minister Mallikarjun Kharge and Union Health Minister Ghulam Nabi Azad.

== Reduced Level ==
The RL of the station is 1671 m above mean sea level.

== Design ==
Like every other station in this mega project, this station also features Kashmiri wood architecture, with an intended ambience of a royal court which is designed to complement the local surroundings to the station. Station signage is predominantly in Urdu, English and Hindi.

== Platforms ==
There are a total of 2 platforms and 3 tracks. The platforms are connected by foot overbridges. These platforms are built to accommodate a 24 coach express train.

=== Station layout ===
G	Street level	Exit/Entrance & ticket counter
P1	FOB, Side platform, No-1 doors will open on the left/right
P1	Track 1
P1	Track 2
P1	Track 3
P1	FOB, Island platform, No- 2 doors will open on the left/right

== See also ==
- Srinagar railway station
- Udhampur railway station
- Anantnag railway station
- Shri Mata Vaishno Devi Katra railway station
- List of railway stations in India
