= National Highway 444 (India) =

National Highway in India

National Highway 444
- Map of the National Highway in red

Route information
- Length: 105 km (65 mi)

Major junctions
- North end: Srinagar
- South end: Quazigund

Location
- Country: India
- States: Jammu and Kashmir

Highway system
- Roads in India; Expressways; National; State; Asian

National Highway 444 is a national highway entirely in the union territory of Jammu and Kashmir in India. It is a branch of National Highway 44.

== Route Plan ==
Srinagar - Badgam - Pulwama - Shopian - Kulgam - Quazigund.

== Junctions ==
Location	Junction/Terminus	Notes
Srinagar	Terminal	Start of NH 444
Quazigund	Terminal	End of NH 444

NH 44 Terminal near Srinagar.
NH 44 Terminal near Quazigund.

== See also ==
- List of national highways in India
- List of national highways in India by state
