= Monghall =

- Location within Jammu and Kashmir Location within India Location within Asia Location within Earth
- Coordinates: 33.709455°N 75.133813°E
- Country: India
- Union territory: Jammu and Kashmir
- District: Anantnag

Monghall is a town in Anantnag tehsil in Anantnag district in the Indian union territory of Jammu and Kashmir. It is one of 105 villages in Anantnag Block along with areas like Bagh e Nowgam, 7 Chaks, Upper Poora, Bagaw Mohalla, Peer Mohalla, Muqdampora etc. Dr. Mohd Ishaq Mir is the renowned doctor and Junaid Manzoor Shah is the renowned Student activist of the region.

Kashmiri is the local language. People in the area also speak Urdu and Hindi.

== See also ==
- Anantnag District
- Doru shahabad
- Khanabal
- Chowgam
- Awantipora
- Kulgam District
- Fatehpora
