= Ashajipora =

Neighborhood in Anantnag, Jammu and Kashmir, India

Ashajipora, also known as Ashajipur, is a neighborhood located in Anantnag district, Jammu and Kashmir, India. It is the hub of industrial training institute.
