= Sarbal =

Sarbal سربال
- Village
- Location within Iran
- Coordinates: 30°10′17″N 51°11′02″E
- Country: Iran
- Province: Fars
- County: Mamasani
- Bakhsh: Central
- Rural District: Bakesh-e Do

Population (2006)
  - Total: 43
- Time zone: UTC+3:30 (IRST)
  - Summer (DST): UTC+4:30 (IRDT)

Sarbal (Persian: سربال, also Romanized as Sarbāl) is a village in Bakesh-e Do Rural District, in the Central District of Mamasani County, Fars province, Iran. At the 2006 census, its population was 43, in 10 families.
