= Dialgam =

Village in anantnag

- Location in Anantnag, India Dialgam (India)
- Coordinates: 33.43°N 75.09°E
- Country: India
- State: Jammu and Kashmir
- District: Anantnag

Population (2011)
  - Total: 7,000

Languages
  - Official: Kashmiri, Urdu, Hindi, Dogri, English
- Time zone: UTC+5:30 (IST)
- Postal code: 192210

Dialgam is a large village situated in Anantnag tehsil, in Anantnag district of Jammu and Kashmir. It is one of 150 villages in Anantnag Block along with villages like Hardu Shichan and Pal Pora.Ishfaq Kawa

== Geography ==
Dialgam is located at 33°43' N 75°9' E, [2] at an elevation of 5,300 feet (1,600 m) above sea level, at a distance of 65 kilometres (40 mi) from Srinagar.

== Demographics ==
As of the India census, Dialgam had a population of 6,737. Males constituted 51% of the population and females 49%. Dialgam had an average literacy rate of 80.16%, higher than the national average of 68.5%: male literacy was 88.03%, and female literacy was 71.46%. In Dialgam, 17% of the population was under 6 years of age. Almost 97 percent are Muslims and 3 percent are Hindus.

Educational institutions:

1. Government Medical College Dialgam

2. Government Higher Secondary School Dialgam

3. Hanfia High School Dialgam

4. Crescent School Dialgam

5. Moral High Educational Institute Dialgam

6. Girls High School Dialgam Anantnag

7. Government Middle School.

8. Blessi Kids Smart School.

Administrative offices:

1. Office of the Naib- Tehsildar Anantnag.

Banks:

1. Jammu and Kashmir Bank Dialgam

2. Elaqahi Bank Dialgam.

Hospitals and Dispensaries:

1. Government Hospital Dialgam Anantnag (strength of 50 beds approximately)

2. Government Dispensary Dialgam Anantnag

3. Government Veterinary Centre.

4. Government Medical College.

Religious Institutions:

1. Baba Badrud Deen Reeshi Shrine.
2. Five major mosques.
3. One Hindu Temple.
