= Jawahar Tunnel =

Road tunnel in Indian union territory of Jammu and Kashmir

Jawahar tunnel
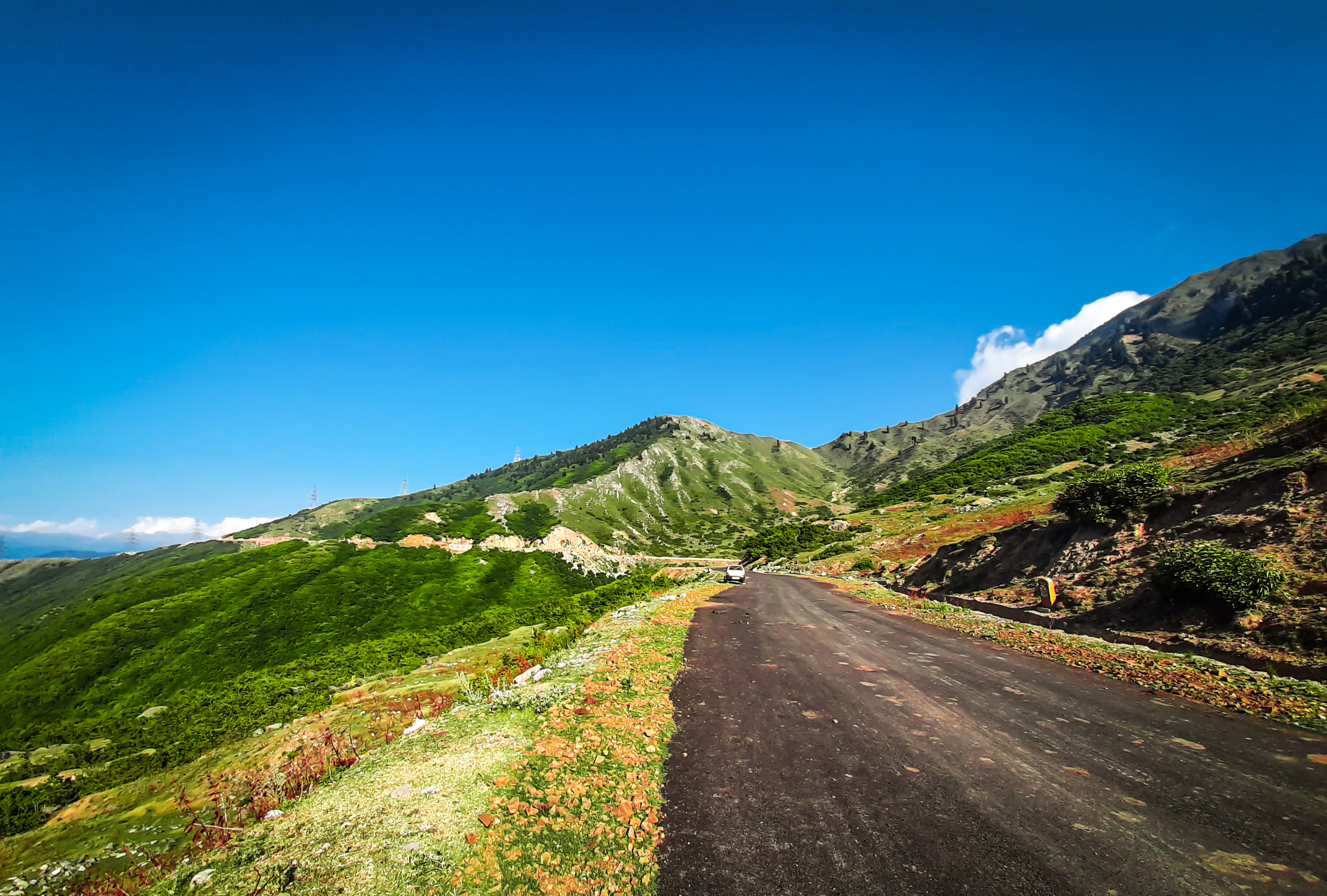
- Jawahar Tunnel Road.
- Interactive map of Jawahar tunnel

Overview
- Coordinates: 33.508°N 75.209°E
- Status: Active
- Route: NH 44; Banihal ---- Qazigund
- Start: Banihal
- End: Qazigund

Operation
- Work began: 1954
- Constructed: C. Baresel A.G & A. Kunz & Co
- Opened: 22 December 1956
- Traffic: Automotive
- Toll: None
- Vehicles per day: 7000

Technical
- Length: 2.85 km (1.77 mi)
- No. of lanes: 2
- Max elevation: 2,194 metres (7,198 ft)

Jawahar Tunnel, also called Banihal Tunnel is a road tunnel at an elevation of 2,194 m (7,198 ft) in union territory of Jammu and Kashmir in India below the Banihal Pass in the Pir Panjal mountain range in lower Himalayas. It was named after Jawaharlal Nehru, the first prime minister of India. It was constructed between 1954 and 1956. It has been operational since 22 December 1956. The length of tunnel is 2.85km. It has two parallel tubes on a one lane road in either direction. It is situated between Banihāl and Qazigund on NH 1A that has been renumbered NH 44. The tunnel facilitates round-the-year road connectivity between Srinagar and Jammu.

== History ==
When the Pakistani raiders tried to capture the Kashmir valley in October 1947, the road from Jammu to Srinagar over the Banihal Pass was an indifferent track 300km long not fit for induction of Indian troops into the Valley. The first Indian troops had to be airlifted to Srinagar. The road was improved after 1947 but snow closed the Pass during the winters. A tunnel below the Pass was needed.

The tunnel was constructed by Alfred Kunz and C. Barsel of Germany between 1954 and 1960. It was designed for 150 vehicles per day in each direction but the number of vehicles increased in fifty years to 7,000 in both directions.

It is guarded by military round the clock. Photography or videography inside or nearby the tunnel is strictly prohibited. Once the vehicle enters the tunnel, it has to maintain the same speed throughout the tunnel. CCTVs are installed in the tunnel for continuous monitoring.

The tunnel was renovated by the Border Roads Organization under the project BEACON in 1997. Until 2009, the tunnel was closed for civilian traffic between midnight and 08:00. It is now open 24 hours a day.

== New tunnel at a lower elevation ==
The approach roads to the tunnel are avlanche-prone. A need was felt to construct another tunnel at a lower elevation. The new 8.5 km long tunnel with two tubes of two-lane road in each direction at elevation of 1,790 m (5,870 ft), 400 m lower than Jawahar Tunnel, was constructed in 2011-2019 and opened in 2021. It reduced the distance from Jammu to Srinagar by 16 km. Most of the vehicles now use the new Banihal Qazigund Road Tunnel and the traffic through the Jawahar Tunnel has reduced to a trickle.

== Current status ==
Fuel-laden tankers and trucks carrying gas cylinders and other explosives material are not allowed in the new tunnel and have to still use the Jawahar Tunnel. Some vehicles from nearby villages and towns also use Jawahar tunnel.

After renovation in 1997, the tunnel had a two-way ventilation system, pollution & temperature sensors, lighting system and with emergency phones for any assistance. In 2021, the Border Roads Organization decided to refurbish the strategically important tunnel and awarded a tender for INR 800 million but the contractor failed to do the work. A fresh tender will be called in mid-2023 to refurbish and upgrade the tunnel's ventilation and other systems and enhance and improve the tunnel's beauty and promote it as a tourist destination.

The reduced traffic through the Jawahar Tunnel had a very adverse effect on the local populace. Hundreds of people, who were earning their livelihood from the shops and kiosks along both sides of Jawahar Tunnel became unemployed. Such people from lower Munda Kashmir to Shaitani Nallah, Chakoor Nallah, Nowgam, Thethar and Chereel in Banihal have pinned all their hopes on the project to beautify Jawahar Tunnel and develop the tunnel and Banihal Pass itself as tourist attractions to generate means of livelihood.

== See also ==
- Tunnels in North West India
