= Pir Panjal Range =

Mountain range of the Lower Himalayas

Coordinates: 33°53′36″N 74°29′19″E

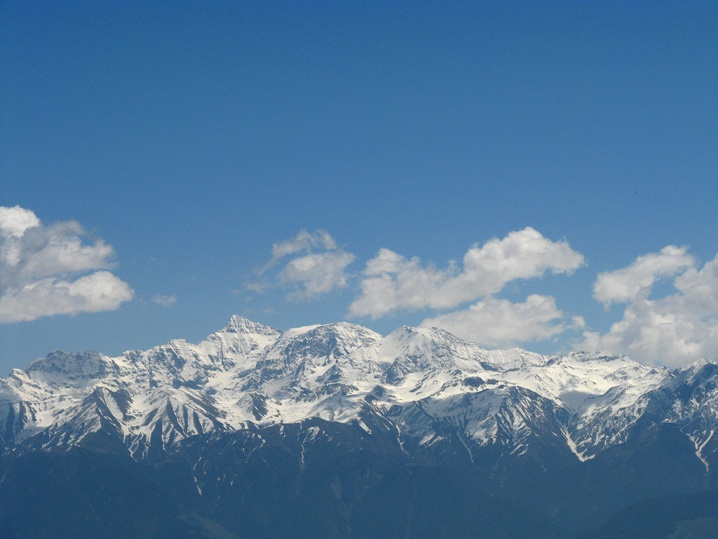
Pir Panjal Range as seen from Khajjiar, Himachal Pradesh, India

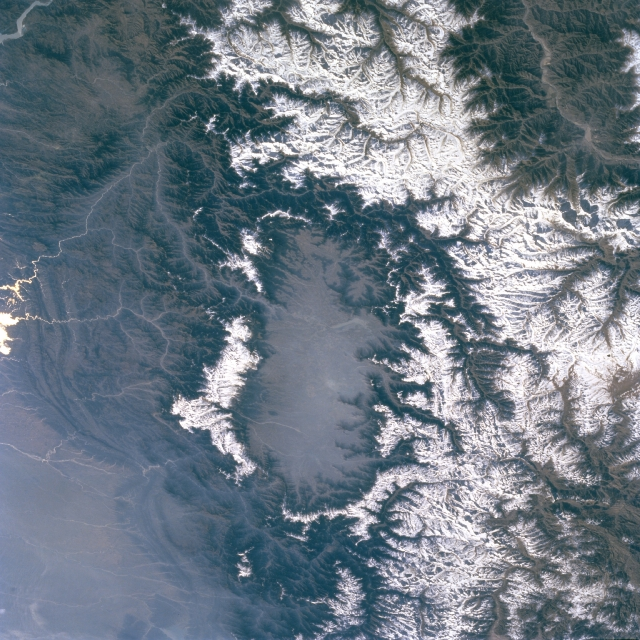
Satellite image of the Kashmir Valley, with snow-capped Pir Panjal range to its southwest (left in image)

The Pir Panjal Range (/piːr pʌnˈdʒɑːl/) is a range of mountains in the Lower Himalayan region located in the Western Himalayas of the northern Indian subcontinent. It runs southeast to northwest between the Beas and Neelam/Kishanganga rivers, in the Indian state of Himachal Pradesh and Indian-administered union territory of Jammu and Kashmir, with its northwestern end extending into territory administered by Pakistan. The Himalayas show a gradual elevation towards the Dhauladhar and Pir Panjal ranges. Pir Panjal is the largest and westernmost range of the Lesser Himalayas. Near the banks of the Sutlej River, it dissociates itself from the main Himalayan range and forms a divide between the Beas and Ravi rivers on one side and the Chenab on the other. Further west, the Pir Panjal range forms the southwestern boundary of the Kashmir Valley, separating it from the hills of Jammu region, forming a divide between the Jhelum River and Chenab River.

== Etymology ==
The Pir Panjal range is named after the Pir Panjal Pass, whose original name as recorded by Srivara, is Panchaladeva (IAST: Pāñcāladeva, meaning the deity of Panchala). Panchala is a country mentioned in the Mahabharata in the northwest Uttar Pradesh. However, there are also traditions that place the Mahabharata regions in western Punjab and southern Kashmir. Scholar Dineshchandra Sircar has analysed the geography described in the Shakti‐sangama Tantra, where this is indeed the case. Scholar M. A. Stein believes that the concept of deity must have been translated into that of a Pir after the region was Islamised.

== Peaks of the range ==
Deo Tibba (6,001 m (19,688 ft)) and Indrasan (6,221 m (20,410 ft)) are two important peaks at the eastern end of the mountain range. They can be approached from both the Parvati-Beas Valley (Kulu District), Upper Belt of Chamba Himachal Pradesh and the Chandra (Upper Chenab) Valley (Lahaul and Spiti District) in Himachal Pradesh. The hill station of Gulmarg in Kashmir lies in this range.

== Passes ==
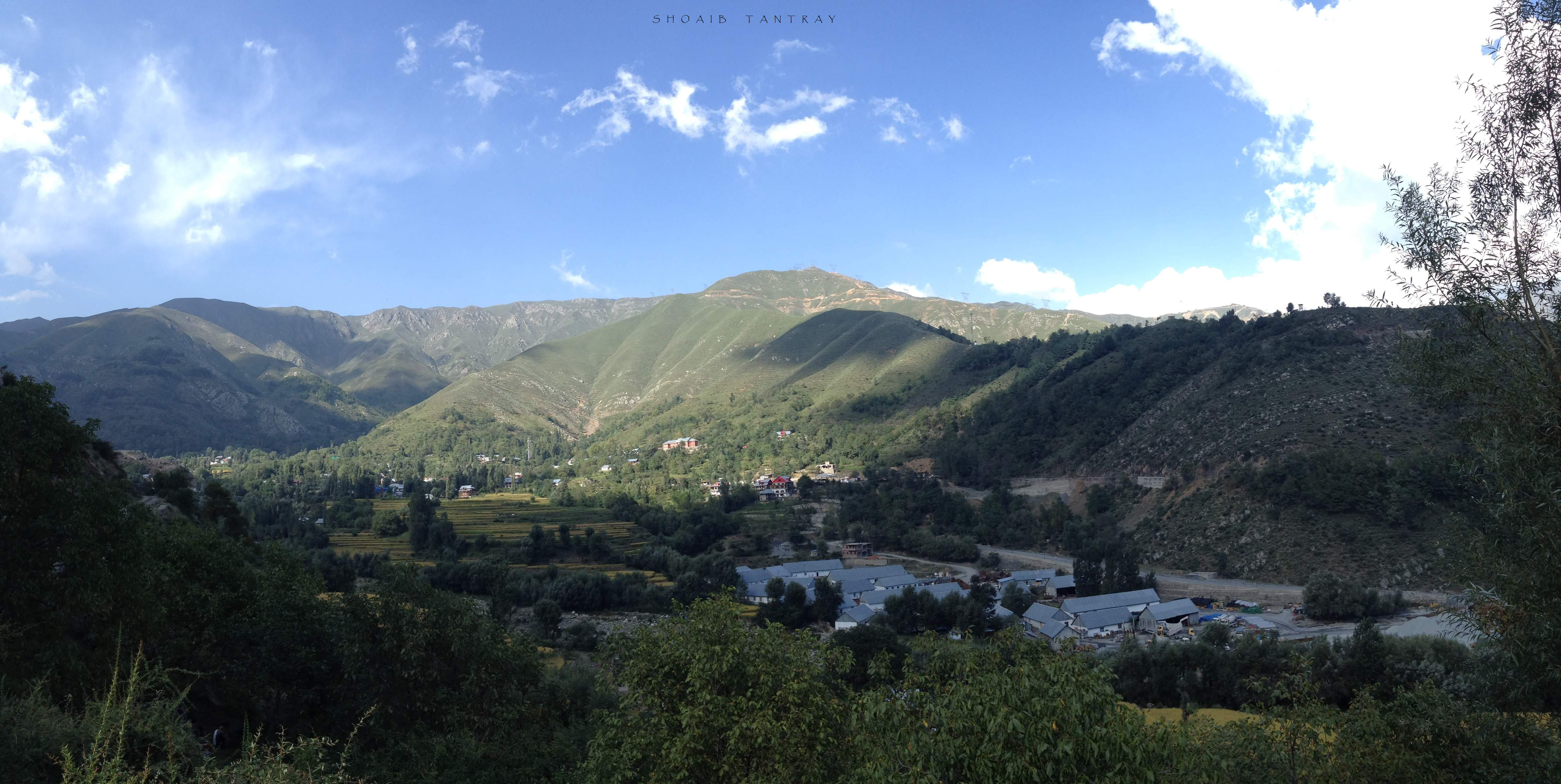
Pir Panjal range as seen from Banihal, Jammu and Kashmir

Haji Pir Pass (altitude 2,637 m (8,652 ft)) on the western Pir Panjal range on the road between Poonch and Uri in Indian-administered Kashmir. Despite taking the pass twice in military operations (in 1948 and 1965), India left the pass under Pakistani control.

Pir Panjal Pass (also called Peer Ki Gali) connects the Kashmir Valley with Rajouri and Poonch via the Mughal Road. It is the highest point of the Mughal Road at 3,490 m (11,450 ft) and lies to the southwest of the Kashmir Valley. The nearest town to the pass in the Kashmir valley is Shopian.

Munawar Pass (altitude 3,600 m (11,800 ft)) is north of Peer Ki Gali, overlooking Rajouri.

Banihal pass (2,832 m (9,291 ft)) lies at the head of the Jhelum River at the southern end of the Kashmir Valley. Banihal and Qazigund lie on either side of the pass.

Sinthan pass connects the Kashmir Valley with Kishtwar in the Jammu region.

Saach Pass, at 4,414 metres (14,482 ft) in the Chamba district, connects Chamba with the Pangi Valley of Himachal Pradesh, India.

Rohtang La (altitude 3,978 m (13,051 ft)) in the eastern Pir Panjal range connects Manali in the Kullu Valley to Keylong in the Lahaul Valley.

Passes of the Pir Panjal Range

== Tunnels ==
=== Jawahar Tunnel ===
The Jawahar Tunnel is a 2.85 km (1.77 mi) long tunnel through Pir Panjal mountain under the Banihal pass connects Banihal with Qazigund on the other side of the mountain. The Jawahar Tunnel was named after the first Prime Minister of India was constructed in the early 1950s and commissioned in December 1956 to ensure snow-free passage throughout the year. It is at elevation of about 2,194 m (7,198 ft). It was originally designed for 150 vehicles per day but is now used by more than 7,000 vehicles daily. Therefore, a new wider and longer tunnel has been planned at a lower elevation.

=== Banihal Qazigund Road Tunnel ===
Construction of a new 8.45 km (5.25 mi) long twin-tube Banihal Qazigund Road Tunnel started in 2011 and was commissioned in 2021. The new tunnel is at a lower elevation than the existing Jawahar tunnel and has reduced the road distance between Banihal and Qazigund by 16 km (9.9 mi). It is also less prone to snow avalanches as it is at a lower elevation.

=== Atal Tunnel ===
The Atal Tunnel has been built under the Rohtang Pass in the eastern Pir Panjal range of the Himalayas on the Leh-Manali Highway. With 8.8 km (5.5 mi) length, the tunnel is the second longest road tunnel in India and has reduced the distance between Manali and Keylong by about 60 km (37 mi). The tunnel is at 3,100 metres (10,171 ft) elevation whereas the Rohtang pass is at 3,978 metres (13,051 ft) elevation. Lying on the Manali-Leh axis, this is one of the two routes to Ladakh.

=== Banihal Railway Tunnel ===
The Pir Panjal Railway Tunnel, an 11.215 kilometres (6.969 mi) railway tunnel, passes through the Pir Panjal Range in Jammu and Kashmir. It connects Quazigund and Banihal and is a part of the Udhampur-Srinagar-Baramulla railway project. The tunnel was commissioned on 26 June 2013 for regular service. It is India's longest railway tunnel.

== See also ==
- Ganga Choti
- Banni Mata Temple
