= Banihal–Qazigund Railway Tunnel =

Railway tunnel in India

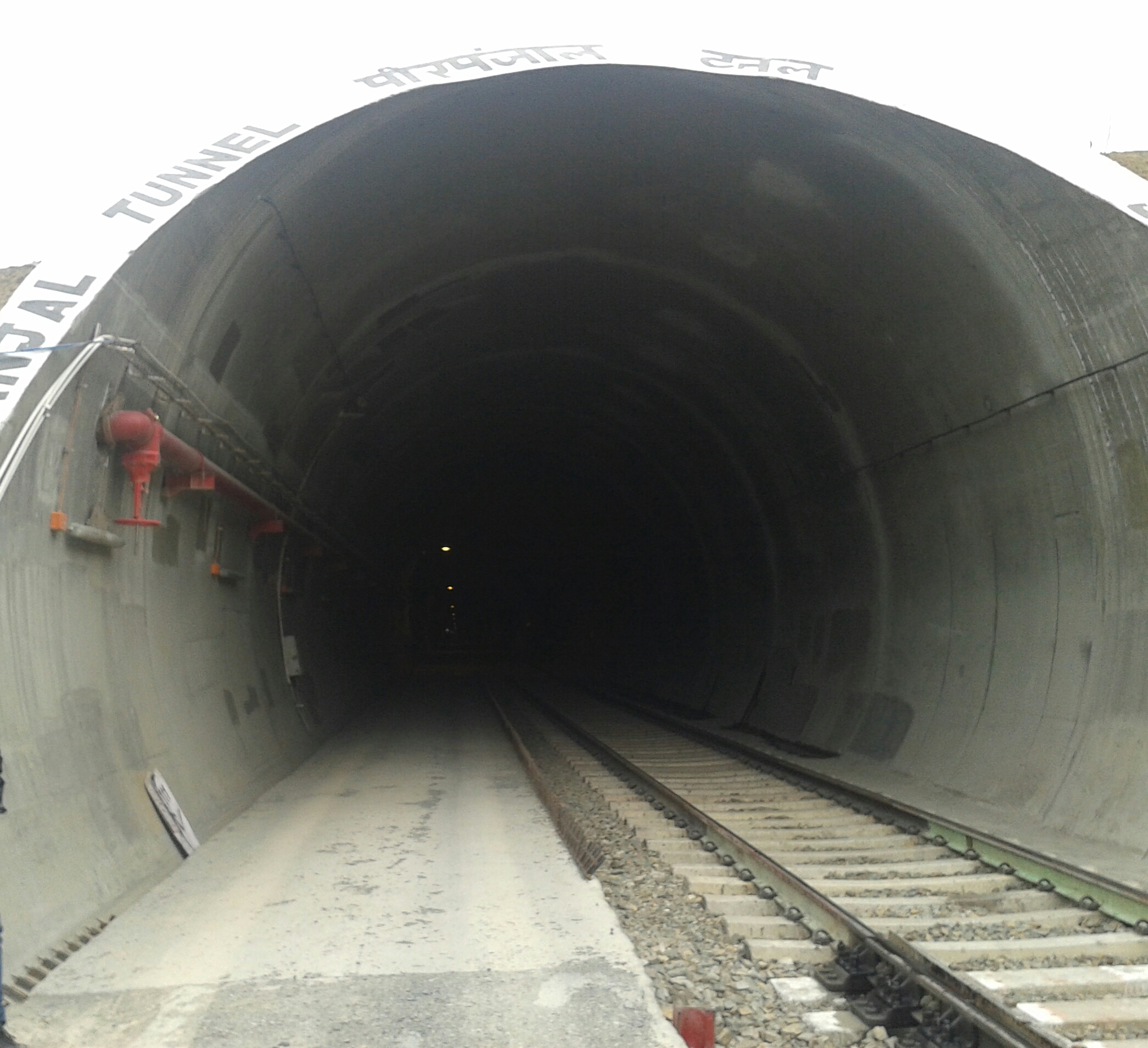
- Qazigund Rail Tunnel
- Interactive map of Banihal–Qazigund Railway Tunnel

Overview
- Line: Jammu Tawi–Udhampur–Srinagar–Baramulla railway link
- Location: Jammu and Kashmir
- Status: Active
- Start: Banihal
- End: Qazigund

Operation
- Opened: June 2013
- Owner: Indian Railways
- Operator: Indian Railways
- Traffic: Train

Technical
- Line length: 11.21 km (6.97 mi)
- No. of tracks: Single track
- Track gauge: 1,676 mm (5 ft 6 in) (Broad gauge)
- Operating speed: up to 75 km/h (47 mph)

The Banihal–Qazigund Railway Tunnel or Pir Panjal railway tunnel is an 11.215 kilometres (6.969 mi)-long railway tunnel located in Pir Panjal Range of middle Himalayas in Jammu and Kashmir, India, south of Qazigund town. It is a part of the Jammu–Baramulla line.

The north portal of the railway tunnel is at 33.56179°N 75.19886°E and its south portal is at 33.4632°N 75.1940°E.

== Length and elevation ==
The average elevation of the railway tunnel is 1,760 m (5,770 ft) or about 440 m (1,440 ft) below the existing road tunnel, the Jawahar Tunnel, which is at elevation of about 2,194 m (7,198 ft). The tunnel is 8.40 metres (27.6 ft) wide with a height of 7.39 metres (24.2 ft). There is a three-metre-wide (9.8 ft) road along the length of the tunnel for the maintenance of railway tracks and emergency relief. It takes approximately 9 minutes and 30 seconds for the train to pass through the tunnel.

For a short time, Banihal–Qazigund Railway Tunnel will be India's longest railway tunnel. Once completed, the 11.55 km-long rail tunnel between Senapati and Imphal West districts on Jiribam–Imphal line will surpass the Pir Panjal Railway Tunnel as India's longest tunnel.

== Progress of the project ==
The new Banihal–Qazigund tunnel for the Jammu–Baramulla line connecting Bichleri Valley of Banihal with Qazigund area of Kashmir Valley has been constructed as a part of its Udhampur–Srinagar–Baramulla rail link project. The boring was completed in four years in October 2011, its lining and laying of rail tracks was completed in the next one year and trial run commenced on 28 December 2012. The tunnel was commissioned on 26 June 2013 and commercial runs started from 27 June 2013.

The rail tunnel reduces the distance between Qazigund and Banihal by 17 kilometres (11 mi) (from 35 kilometres (22 mi) by road to 17.5 kilometres (10.9 mi) by train). Banihal railway station is situated at 1,702 m (5,584 ft) above mean sea level.

In 2025, the Ministry of Railways proposed a new 40.2 km Baramulla–Uri railway line, with strategic and tourism significance, and the doubling of the 73.5 km Qazigund–Budgam line to enhance all-weather connectivity in Jammu and Kashmir.

== Gallery ==
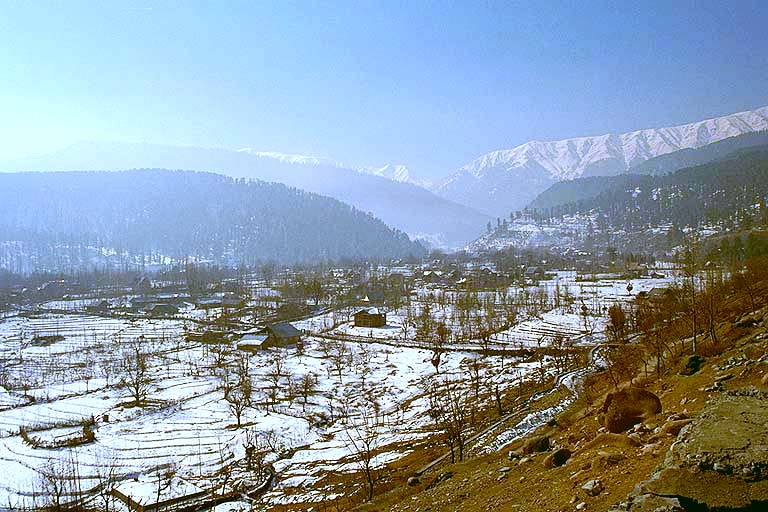
View towards the massive Pir Panjal Range the railway line passes through it.

== See also ==
- Jammu–Baramulla line
- Tunnels in North West India
