= Bringhi River =

River in Anantnag, J&K, India

Coordinates: 33.7391°N 75.1273°E

Location
- Country: India
- State: Jammu and Kashmir
- Region: Kashmir Valley
- District: Anantnag

Physical characteristics
- Length: 30 km (19 mi)

The Bringhi or Brengi river is a river in Anantnag, Jammu and Kashmir, India in the disputed Kashmir region. It flows for a total of 30 kilometres (19 mi) before feeding Jhelum River at Haji Danter, Anantnag. It is formed by the confluence of three streams Nowbugh stream, Ahlan Gadol Stream, and Daksum Stream. Nowbugh Stream originates from the glaciers of Margan Top, Daksum Stream originates from the glaciers of Sinthan in Anantnag district. The river passes through a gorge at Daksum (altitude 2,438 metres (7,999 ft)). Kokernag is in the Bringhi river valley. It is one of the tributary of river Jhelum. Sir Walter Lawrence wrote in his book The Valley of Kashmir that the brang river which disappears at Dewalgam village in the fissures of the limestone is the real source of the Achabal spring. Recently a sink hole appeared in the river at wandevelgam which sucked in the whole flow of the water. This is the second time a sink hole has appeared in this river.
