= Banihal Pass =

Roadway pass connecting Kashmir

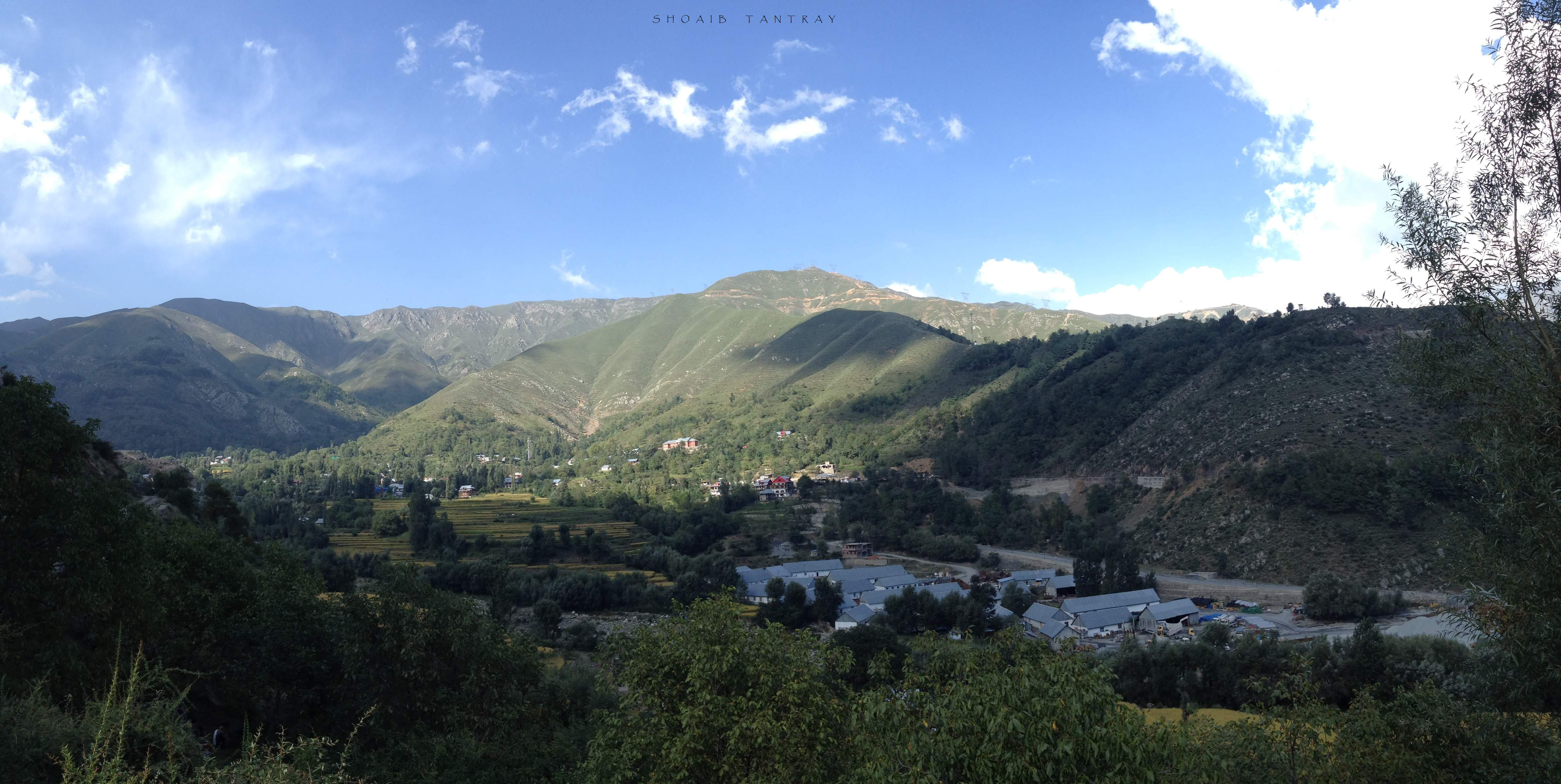
- Banihal Pass

- Location within Jammu and Kashmir Location within India
- Elevation: 2,832 m (9,291 ft)

Third Approach
- Location: India
- Range: Pir Panjal, Himalayas
- Coordinates: 33°30′25″N 75°12′40″E

Banihal Pass is a mountain pass across the Pir Panjal Range in India at a maximum elevation of 2,832 m (9,291 ft). It connects the Kashmir Valley in the Indian union territory of Jammu and Kashmir to the outer Himalaya and the Indo-Gangetic Plain to the south. In the Kashmiri language, "Banihāl" means blizzard.

The road from Jammu to Srinagar transversed Banihal Pass until 1956 when the Jawahar Tunnel was constructed under the pass. The road now passes through the tunnel and the Banihal Pass is no longer used for road transport.

As from the Banihal Pass a sharp change in nature and mountains can be seen. The natural surroundings of Kashmir reveal themselves through the Banihal and Jhelum valley roads.

Zaban Glacier is a famous hill station located in the Sanglaab Valley, close to the Banihal Pass. This glacier is situated to the west of the village of Khairkoot. The glacier is almost 2 km long in the lap of Sundur Top (3,660 m above sea level) Zaban Glacier is also the origin of Bachliri Nallaha, the main tributary of the Chenab River. Local tourists visit this glacier from April to mid-August. The glacier is connected by road to the Jammu-Srinagar National Highway, en route from Nowgam. It is almost 3 km from Nowgam and 2 km from Sanglaab colony.
