= Fatehpora =

Fatehpora Fatehpur
- village
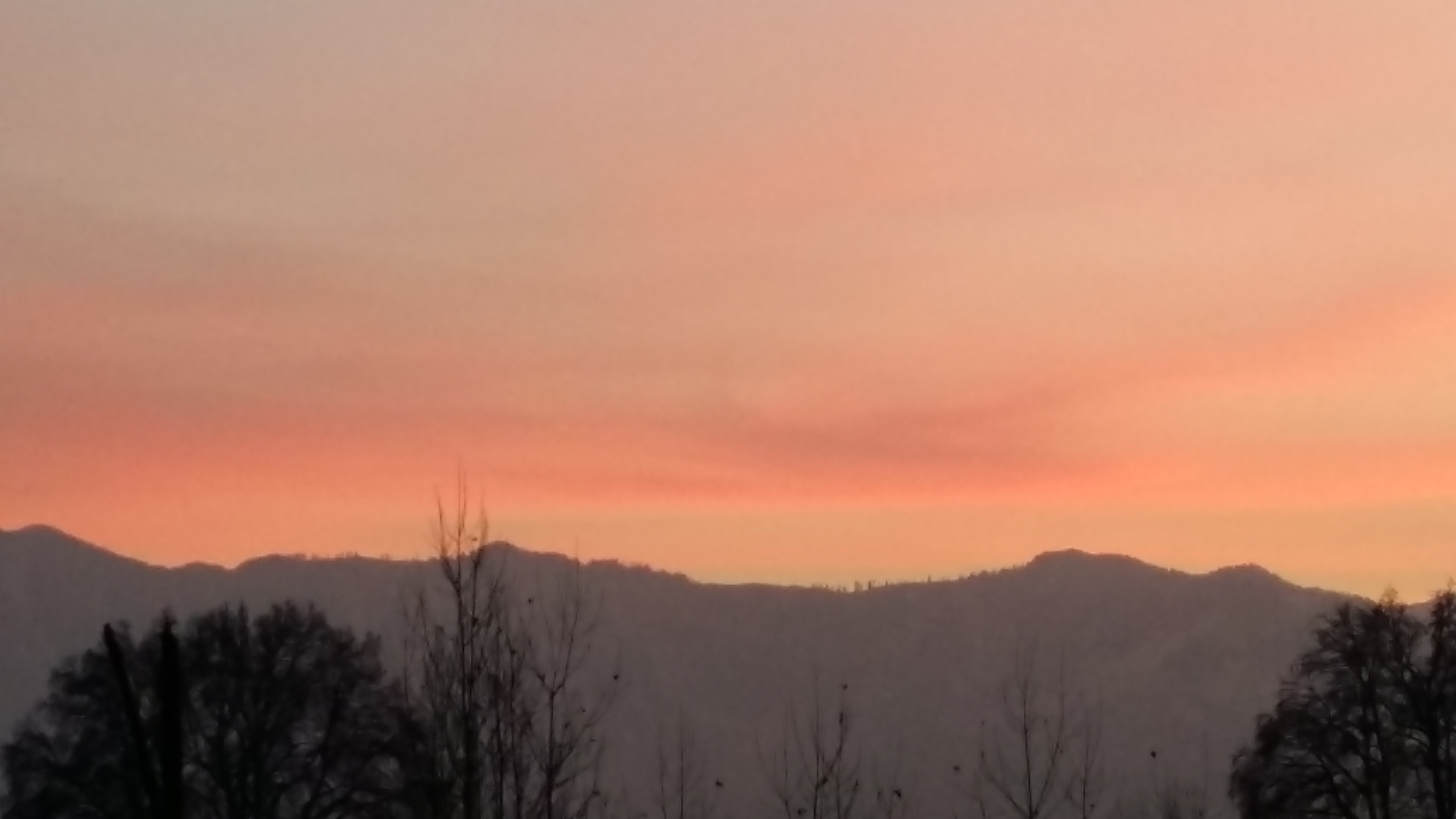
- Sunset in Fatehpora

- Location in Anantnag, India Fatehpora (India)
- Coordinates: 33.656027°N 75.160375°E
- Country: India
- Union territory: Jammu and Kashmir
- District: Anantnag
- Settled: 5000 BCE
- Elevation: 1,652 m (5,420 ft)

Population (2011)
  - Total: 6,737

Languages
  - Official: Kashmiri, Urdu, Hindi, Dogri, English
- Time zone: UTC+5:30 (IST)
- PIN: 192210
- Telephone code: 91-1932
- Vehicle registration: JK03
- Sex ratio: 912 ♂/♀
- Literacy: 60.00%
- Website: anantnag.nic.in

Fatehpora also known as Fatehpura & Fatehpur, is an economic hub area of Anantnag district in the union territory of Jammu and Kashmir, India. Fatehpora is located at 33.656027°N 75.160375°E. It has an average elevation of 1652 metres (5419 feet) above mean sea level.

== Demographics ==
As per the 2011 India Census, Fatehpora had a population of 6,737, with males constituting 51% of the population and females, 49%. Fatehpora had an average literacy rate of 60%, higher than the national average of 59.5%. The male literacy was 67%, and female literacy was 53%. In Fatehpora, 17% of the population was under 6 years of age. Nearly all of the persons living in Fatehpora are Sunni Muslims.

== Geography ==
Fatehpora is constituted of main area like Babadar, Khan Pora, Kabamarg, Gund Fatehpora & Kuchipora. Fatehpora is located at 33.65°N 75.15°E, [2] at an average elevation of 1600 metres (5300 feet) above sea level, at a distance of 65 kilometres (40 mi) from Srinagar. Near Fatehpora exists the confluence of three streams, Brengi and Sandran, and the resulting river is named Veth or Jhelum. There are several larger streams such as Brengi. Another stream Lidar joins the river a little downstream and from that point the river becomes navigable.

== Transport ==
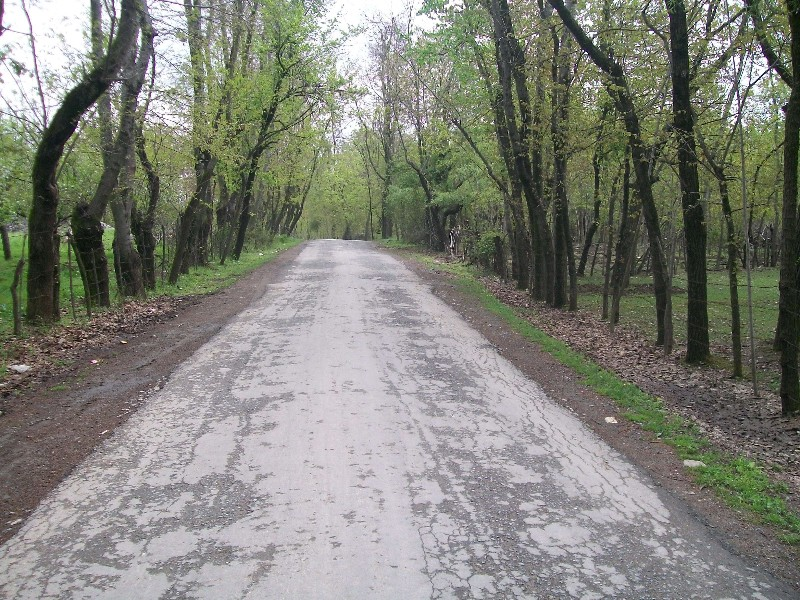
Fatehpora-Sadura Road

=== By Rail ===
Sadura Railway Station and Anantnag Railway Station are the closest railway stations for Fatehpora. However, ever Jammu Tawi Railway Station is major railway station 243 km near to Fatehpora.

== Education ==
=== Colleges ===
- Govt. Polytechnic College, Larkipora

=== Schools ===
1. Baba Naseeb-u-Din Gazi Memorial Public School, Fatehpora
2. Government Higher Secondary School, Kabamarg (Fatehpora)
3. Government Middle School, Fatehpora
4. Government Middle School (Girls), Fatehpora

== See also ==
- Anantnag
