= Chowgam =

Chowgam Tsowgam
- Mini District
- Location in Jammu and Kashmir, India Chowgam (India)
- Coordinates: 33°37′14″N 75°7′22″E
- Country: India
- State: Jammu and Kashmir
- District: Kulgam (formerly with Anantnag District)

Languages
  - Official: Kashmiri, Urdu, Hindi, Dogri, English
- Time zone: UTC+5:30 (IST)
- PIN: 192221
- Telephone code: 01932
- Vehicle registration: JK 18

Chowgam or Tsowgam is a village in the Kulgam district, with its block located in Qazigund of Anantnag district. It is located 13 km (8 mi) from its main district Kulgam, 07 km (4 mi) from its block Qazigund and 18 km (11 mi) from district Anantnag. It is one of the oldest villages in Kashmir Valley. Sub Villages in its proximity are Churat, Sopat, Nawa, Khargund, Gundipora, Brinal Lammer, Bonigam and many other minor villages.

== Geography ==
Chowgam is located at the south-western part of Kashmir as well as Anantnag district. Two main Rivers flow from this mini town:

- River Lamer, rising from the southern Mountain surrounding this village.
- River Wyeth, rising from the kund Spring and joining Lamer at the end of the Village.

These two rivers make one unit and join the Jehlum river and continue their journey. Paddy fields are located near the Boundary of the village.

== Religion ==
People mostly follow Islam. There is a shrine of Baba Naseeb Din Gazi who was from Iraq. Baba Naseeb Ud Din Gazi (RA) was a revered saint known for his spiritual influence and teachings in Kashmir. His life and legacy are steeped in mystical tales and spiritual anecdotes, such as the one you mentioned about his burial. According to the story, after his death in Chowgam, multiple villages surrounding the area desired to bury him in their own villages due to his spiritual stature. However, his body mysteriously moved from Chowgam and came to rest in Bijbehara village of Anantnag, where he was eventually buried. Once there were Kashmiri Pandits but migrated to other places during the insurgency in the late 1980s and continued till the 1990s, still there are some Hindu families residing who never left even after the insurgency.
