= National Highway 1A (India, old numbering) =

Former name for a highway in India

National Highway 1A
- Map of Old National Highway 1A in red
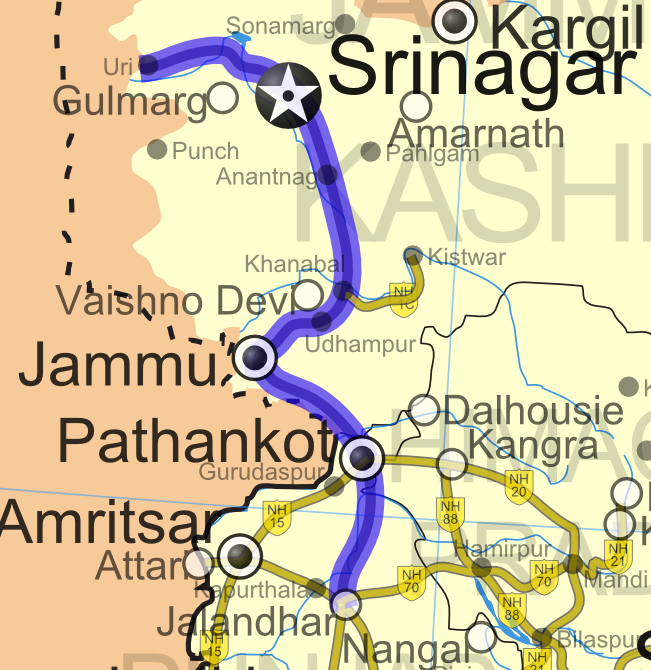
- Road map of India with National Highway 1A highlighted in solid blue color

Route information
- Length: 663 km (412 mi) N-S: 554 km (344 mi) (Srinagar - Jalandhar)

Major junctions
- South end: Jalandhar, Punjab
- NH 1 in Jalandhar NH 1D in Srinagar; NH 15 in Pathankot NH 20 in Pathankot
- North end: Uri, Jammu and Kashmir, before India-Pakistan border

Location
- Country: India
- States: Punjab: 108 km (67 mi); Himachal Pradesh: 14 km (8.7 mi); Jammu & Kashmir: 541 km (336 mi)
- Primary destinations: Jalandhar - Madhopur - Jammu - Banihal - Srinagar - Baramula - Uri

Highway system
- Roads in India; Expressways; National; State; Asian
← NH 1	→ NH 1B

National Highway 1A (NH 1A) was a National Highway in North India that connected the Kashmir Valley to Jammu and the rest of India. The northern terminal was in Uri in Jammu and Kashmir and the southern terminal was in Jalandhar. Stretches of old NH 1A ran through some extremely treacherous terrain and shut-offs because of avalanches or landslides common in Winter months. The famous Jawahar Tunnel that connects Jammu with the Kashmir Valley across the Pir Panjal Range falls en route. The total length of NH 1A was 663 km.

New tunnels on the road were planned to reduce the distance between the two cities by 82 km and the travel time by two-thirds. Most of these tunnels such as Dr. Syama Prasad Mookerjee Tunnel and new Banihal double_road_tunnel have been executed and commissioned.

== Renumbering ==
NH 1A number now does not exist and old NH 1A is now a part of new NH 1 and NH 44 after renumbering of all national highways in the year 2010.

== National Highways Development Project ==
Approximately 554 km (344 mi)stretch of NH 1A from Srinagar to Jalandhar is a part of the North-South Corridor.

== See also ==
- Mughal Road
- Leh-Manali Highway
- List of national highways in India
- National Highways Development Project
