= Army Goodwill Schools =

- Jammu, Kashmir, Laddakh; India

Information
- Other name: Army Goodwill Public Schools
- Type: Public
- Motto: "Truth is God"
- Established: 1998; 28 years ago
- Founder: Indian Army
- School board: Jammu and Kashmir State Board of School Education; CBSE
- Staff: 1000 (2019)
- Enrollment: 15,000 (2019)
- Website: Official website

The Army Goodwill Schools is a system of schools in Jammu and Kashmir and Ladakh in India, which is run by Indian Army. There are 45 schools established by the Indian Army, as a part of goodwill initiative in Jammu and Kashmir.

Currently, the Northern Command of the Indian Army is running 45 Army Goodwill Schools in Jammu and Kashmir, providing education to nearly 15,000 students. Army Goodwill Schools play an important role in providing quality education to the population affected by terrorism in Jammu and Kashmir.

== History ==
Army Goodwill Schools were started with four primary schools in 1998. Currently, the Indian Army runs 45 Army Goodwill Schools. It is run by the 25 Division of the Indian Army. The Schools recorded 100% pass result in the Central Board of Secondary Education (CBSE) Class 10 exams in the year 2019.

== Army Goodwill Schools in North Kashmir ==
=== Army Goodwill School, Krusan ===
Army Goodwill School Krusan established in 2006 as a goodwill gesture under Operation Sadhbhavana, The School runs classes from Nursery to Class 10th, and the current Principal is Mr Masroor Ahmad Dar.

One of the school's recent accomplishments is that a serving teacher, Ms Mehpara Habib, secured the first position in the National Anthem singing competition and received an appreciation certificate from the Hon'ble Lt Governor of the Union Territory, Sh. Manoj Sinha in 2022.

The school's focus on quality education, all-round development, and fostering overall growth in its wards, combined with its well-equipped infrastructure.

=== Army Goodwill School, Budkot ===
Army Goodwill School Budkot was established in April 2004 as a goodwill gesture under Operation Sadhbhavana at Kachhiwar (near Handwara). The aim of the school is to provide quality Primary and Secondary education to the youth in the area. The school currently runs classes from Nursery to Class 10th and has 439 students. The school is affiliated to the Jammu & Kashmir Board of Secondary Education (JKBOSE) with its syllabus structured around NCERT books.

The school has a well-developed infrastructure including a science laboratory and a multi-purpose auditorium. Besides quality education, the school focusses on imparting a sense of social responsibility amongst the students. The Army Goodwill School, Budkot aims to be the first plastic-free school in North Kashmir by 2023.

=== Army Goodwill School, Mazbug (Sopore) ===
Army Goodwill School Mazbug was established on 1 April 2004 as a goodwill gesture under Operation Sadhbhavana at Mazbug (Sopore). The school was established as a 'model learning centre' and serve as a benchmark for all existing government and private schools in Sopore. The school currently runs classes from Nursery to Class 10th and has 444 students. The school is affiliated to the Jammu & Kashmir Board of Secondary Education (JKBOSE) with its syllabus structured around NCERT books.

The school has well-developed infrastructure including a science laboratory and a multi-purpose auditorium. Besides quality education, the school focusses on sports and social responsibilities. The Army Goodwill School, Mazbug also aims to be a plastic-free school by 2023.

=== Army Goodwill School, Chandigam ===
Hamid Chara Army Goodwill School in Chandigam, Lolab established in the year 2000 under Operation Sadhbhavana, the school has been imparting education from Nursery to Class XII and is affiliated to the Jammu and Kashmir State Board of Education.

The School has well-structured syllabus, state-of-the-art infrastructure, and modern teaching methods make it one of the most popular and highly subscribed schools in the valley. AGS has been a successful effort in contributing towards enhancing the literacy rate of the Lolab valley.

The school's focus on the overall development of children's personalities, exposure to national culture and traditions, and academic.

=== Army Goodwill School, Hajin ===
Army Goodwill School at Hajin was Established on 24 Aug 2005. It was planned and constructed under 'Operation Sadhbhavana' of the Army.

Today the school has grown to a middle school till class X . It follows the State Board of Secondary Education (BOSE) with its syllabus structured on NCERT books, which provides a comprehensive yet simple mode of learning to students. The school attempts to develop the overall personality of a student through interactive learning programme.

=== Army Goodwill School, Bandipora ===
Army Goodwill School, Bandipora was established at Kharpora in 2004 under Operation Sadhbhavana. The school shifted to its present location at Aitmul in the yr 2014 and has been functioning from there ever since.

By 2015, the school had expanded till class X with more than 400 students and was recognised by Jammu and Kashmir State Education Board. It provides an opportunity to the children of Bandipora to reach their full potential and realise their dreams in the field of not only quality education but also on other fields like sports, arts, NCC, Scouts, public speaking etc.

=== Army Goodwill School, Aragam ===
Army Goodwill School, Aragam was established on 01 Apr 2005 under Operation Sadbhavana. It is jointly developed by Army and Aragam Panchayat.

The school follows the curriculum of the State Board of Secondary Education (BOSE) with its syllabus structured on NCERT books, which provides a comprehensive yet simple mode of learning to students. The school is being run up to VIII standard. The school has strength of 187 students drawn from Bandipora Tehsil. The school promotes the concept of "Learn with Fun" with modern training aids and attempts to develop the overall personality of students.

Students who receive education in AGS Aragam belong to various social groups. It also facilitates the students in various co-curricular activities.

== Other details ==
A Goodwill School was renamed as 'Shaheed Lance Naik Nazir Ahmad Wani, Ashok Chakra, Sena Medal, Army Goodwill School' after Nazir Ahmad Wani in June 2019.

In May 2019, Hizbul Mujahideen, a militant organisation threatens Kashmiri parents to not send children to Army Goodwill Schools.

== See also ==
- Kendriya Vidyalaya
- Jawahar Navodaya Vidyalaya
- Indian Army Public Schools
