= Indian Army operations in Jammu and Kashmir =

Military operation

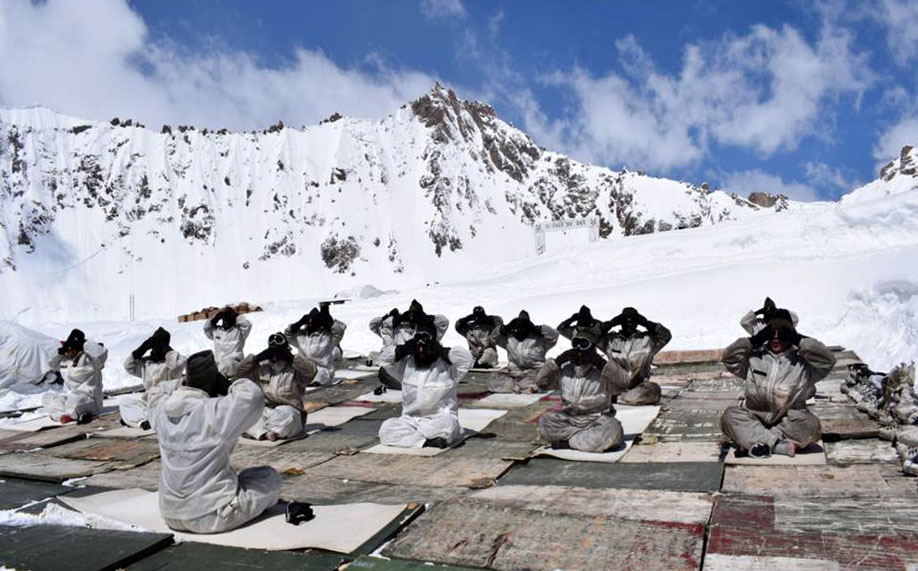
Army jawans performing yoga, on International Day of Yoga 2017, at Siachen.

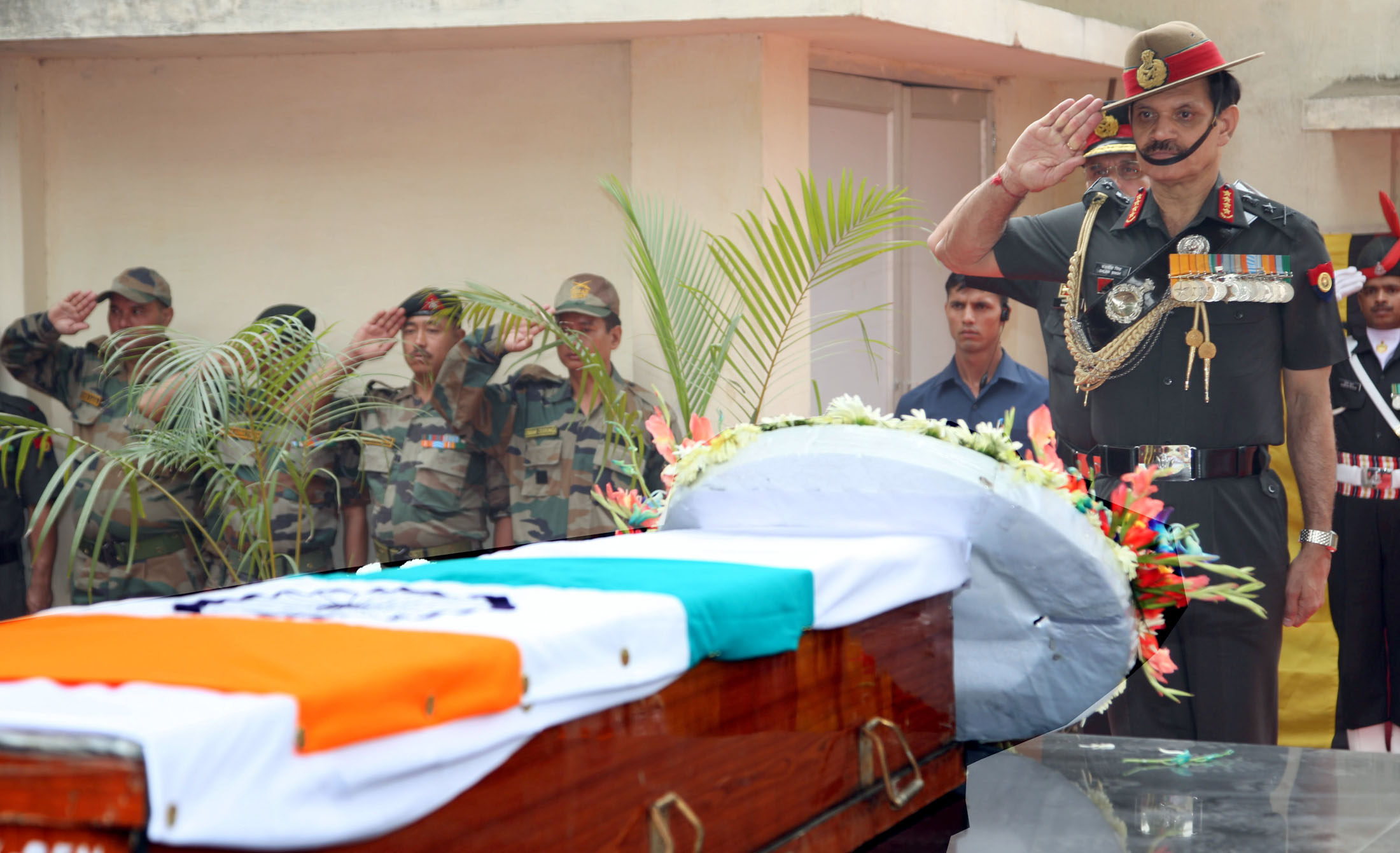
The Chief of Army Staff Gen. Dalbir Singh Suhag paying homage to coffin of Late Rifleman Bishal Gurung of 31 GR, killed in the Thangdhar Sector of Kashmir on 25 May 2015, in New Delhi

Indian Army operations in Jammu and Kashmir, India, it includes security operations such as Operation Rakshak, which began in 1990, Operation Sarp Vinash in 2003 and Operation Randori Behak in 2020. Other operations include humanitarian missions such as Operation Megh Rahat and operations with a social aim such as Operation Goodwill and Operation Calm Down. The Indian Army works in tandem with the other arms of the Indian Armed Forces and security forces in Jammu and Kashmir such as during Mission Sahayata or joint operations.

== Security Impact ==
=== Operation Rakshak ===
Operation Rakshak is an ongoing counter-insurgency and counter-militancy operation started during the height of insurgency in Jammu and Kashmir in June 1990. The operation adapted itself from being merely a "show of strength" in 1990 to encompassing more areas in 1991 such as orders "not to enter the houses of civilians", "not to smoke in religious places" and "not to damage standing crops".The Operation Rakshak Memorial is located in Badami Bagh Cantonment, Srinagar.

The Government in 1991 decides to raise Rashtriya Rifles in order to counter the rising insurgencies in the state of Kashmir. The 15 Crops of the Indian Army along with the HQ RR looks after the ongoing operations in the valley. Personnels form the organisation like Indian Army, CRPF, BSF, CAPF & the SOG of J&K Police have laid down their lives fighting militancy since the early 1990s.

The security personnels who fight militancy in the valley are awarded multiple peace time awards like Ashoka Chakra which is the highest peace time gallantry award Kirti Chakra which is the second highest and Shaurya Chakra which is the third highest gallantry award for courage and bravery. The awards can be presented to as Posthumous as well as to a living person.

=== Operation All Out ===
Operation All Out in Jammu & Kashmir
- Map of the Kashmir
Date	26 December 2014 – present
Location	Jammu & Kashmir
Result	Ongoing

Belligerents
India: Indian Army; Garud Commando Force; Central Reserve Police Force; Border Security Force; J&K Police; National Security Guard	All Parties Hurriyat Conference; Jammu Kashmir Liberation Front; Jamaat-e-Islami Kashmir; United Jihad Council; Lashkar-e-Taiba; Jaish-e-Mohammed; Hizbul Mujahideen; People’s Anti-Fascist Front; Dukhtaran-e-Millat; Harkat-ul-Mujahideen; Harkat-ul-Jihad al-Islami; Al-Badr; Other separatist Movements & Insurgent militant groups; Supported by: Pakistan; Al-Qaeda in the Indian Subcontinent; Ansar Ghazwat-ul-Hind; Supported by: Al-Qaeda; D-Company; Pakistan; Islamic State; Islamic State – Khorasan Province; Islamic State Hind Province; Islamic State J&K

Commanders and leaders
(India) Droupadi Murmu (President) (India) Narendra Modi (Prime Minister) (India) Amit Shah (Minister of Home Affairs) (India) Subrahmanyam Jaishankar (Ministry of External Affairs); Dr.Sujoy Lal Thaosen (Director General); Anil Chauhan (Chief of Defence Staff); Manoj Pande (Chief of the Army Staff); Vivek Ram Chaudhari (Chief of the Air Staff); Rajnath Singh (Minister of Defence); Giridhar Aramane (Defence Secretary) Former: Pranab Mukherjee †; Ram Nath Kovind; Sushma Swaraj; Prakash Mishra; K. Durga Prasad; R. R. Bhatnagar; Anand Prakash Maheshwari; Kuldiep Singh; Bipin Rawat †; Dalbir Singh Suhag; Bipin Rawat; Manoj Mukund Naravane; Arup Raha; Birender Singh Dhanoa; R. K. S. Bhadauria; Arun Jaitley; Manohar Parrikar; Nirmala Sitharaman; R. K. Mathur; G. Mohan Kumar; Sanjay Mitra; Ajay Kumar	Syed Ali Shah Geelani (until 2020); Masarat Alam Bhat (Present 2021); Mohammad Abbas Ansari; Amanullah Khan; Hafiz Saeed; Maulana Azhar; Ilyas Kashmiri †; Zakir Rashid Bhat †; Sayeed Salahudeen; Burhan Wani †; Asiya Andrabi (POW); Fazlur Rehman Khalil; Farooq Kashmiri; Arfeen Bhai; Bakht Zameen; Yasir Ahmed (POW) Islamic State-aligned Dawood Ahmed Sofi †

Strength
Total ≈343,000-700,000; (Nov 2019, including soldier posted at international border (LoC)): Indian Army: 168,000; CAPFs: 160,000; Jammu and Kashmir Police: (Unknown)	Unknown

Casualties and losses
26 killed (2015); 55 killed (2016); 78 killed (2017) 41 killed (2018); 78 killed (2019)	108 militants killed, 67 arrested (2015); 150 militants killed, 79 arrested (2016); 213 militants killed, 97 arrested (2017); 257 militants killed, 12 arrested (2018); 163 militants killed, 10 arrested (2019)

Operation All Out (OAO) a joint offensive launched by Indian security forces in 2017 to flush out militants and terrorists in Kashmir until there is complete peace in the state. Operation All-Out includes the Indian Army, CRPF, Jammu and Kashmir Police, BSF and IB. It was launched against numerous militant groups including Lashkar-e-Taiba, Jaish-e-Mohammed, Hizbul Mujahideen and Al-Badr.

The operation was initiated with the consent of Ministry for Home Affairs Government of India following the unrest in 2016 due to the death of Burhan Wani and subsequent militant and terrorist attacks in the region such as the Amarnath Yatra terror attack on 10 July 2017 in which 08 Hindu pilgrims were killed and at least

On 14 January 2019, the Jammu and Kashmir Governor, Satya Pal Malik, said that there was no such thing as Operation All Out and that the phrase was a misnomer:

“I deny the existence of ‘Operation All-Out’ [...] but someone using bullets can’t expect flowers in return. [...] Security forces always retaliate when they are attacked by militants.”

— Jammu and Kashmir governor, Satya Pal Malik,

=== Operation Calm Down ===
Operation Calm Down was started by the Indian army in Jammu and Kashmir following the aftermath of the death of Burhan Wani in July 2016 which had led to unrest in Kashmir in which more than 90 civilians and 2 security personnel were killed and thousands injured. It started in September 2016. Over 4000 additional troops were deployed as part of Operation Calm Down to bring back order to the region, but direct instructions were given to the troops to use minimal force. The troops were mainly deployed in South Kashmir. Schools, shops and connectivity to some regions in Kashmir had been lost for over three months due to the unrest and militancy and Operation Calm Down aimed to undo this.

=== Operation Sarp Vinash ===
Operation Sarp Vinash (Snake Destroyer) was an operation undertaken by Indian army to flush out terrorists who made bases in the Hilkaka Poonch-Surankot area of the Pir Panjal range in Jammu and Kashmir during April–May 2003. 64 terrorists belonging to various jihadist outfits were killed in operation. The system of hideouts used by the terrorists found during this operation was the largest ever in the known history of insurgency in Jammu and Kashmir.

Over several years, terrorists of groups like Lashkar-e-Taiba (LeT), Harkat-ul-Jihad-e-Islami, al-Badr and Jaish-e-Mohammad (JeM) had been building up safe houses and bunkers in strategic areas of the region of Pir Panjal in Poonch measuring 150 sq kilometers.

The network of bunkers and shelters around the region known as Hill Kaka in Surankote numbered nearly over a hundred, and were intermingled with shelters used by local herdsmen. 9 Para-SF were called to capture Peak 3689 in Hill Kaka after surveillance picked up footprints converging at one location. In this operation, 13 terrorists were killed, the single largest number during Op. Sarp Vinash. 6 Rashtriya Rifles, 163rd Brigade, 100th Brigade and the 15th Corps were also called in for operations. From diaries captured from killed terrorists, the presence of a rudimentary counter-intelligence system of the terrorist organisations was revealed, which involved killing women and children who had given up information to Indian security forces. An extensive communications system using portable satellite phones was also found which allowed the terrorists to contact handlers in Pakistan and India. Paratrooper Sanjog Chhetri, 9 Para (SF), was awarded an Ashoka Chakra in 2004 posthumously for his role in the Operation Sarp Vinash in which he succumbed. During Operation Sarp Vinash, media claims of different Indian media houses about what actually happened during the operation were hyped and very contradictory.

== Operation Madad (Goodwill) ==
Operation Madad, also referred to as Operation Goodwill, was launched in Jammu and Kashmir by the Indian Army under their Military Civic Action programmes aimed at "Winning the Hearts and Minds" (WHAM) of the people in the region. Madad literally means 'harmony', therefore the operation can also be translated as Operation Harmony. The catchphrase of the operation is "Jawan aur Awam, Aman Hai Muqaam" (peace is the destination for both the people and the soldier).

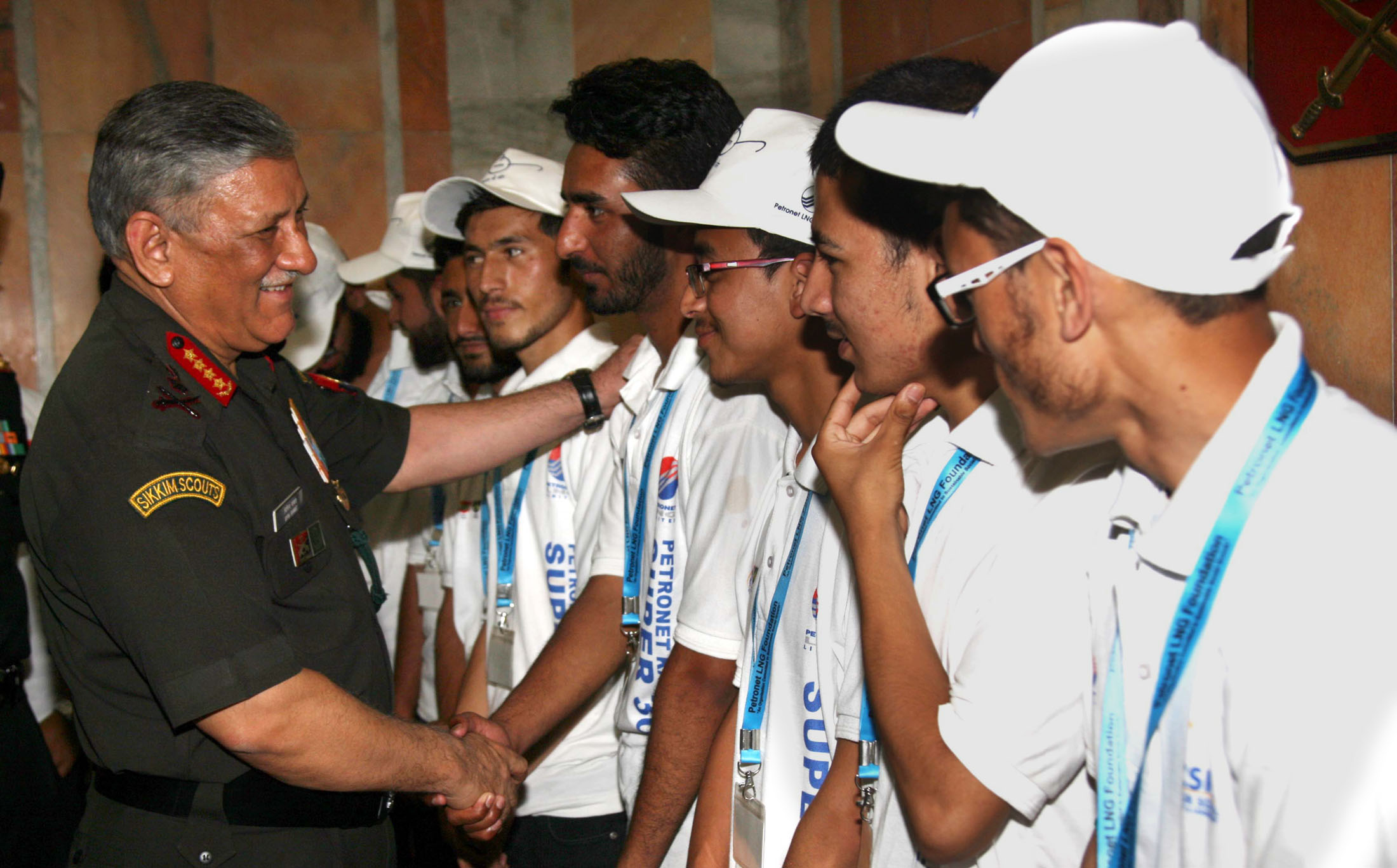
Students from Jammu and Kashmir supported by ‘Kashmir Super 30’ Project who have qualified for the JEE (Main & Advance), 2017-18, interacting with General Bipin Rawat.

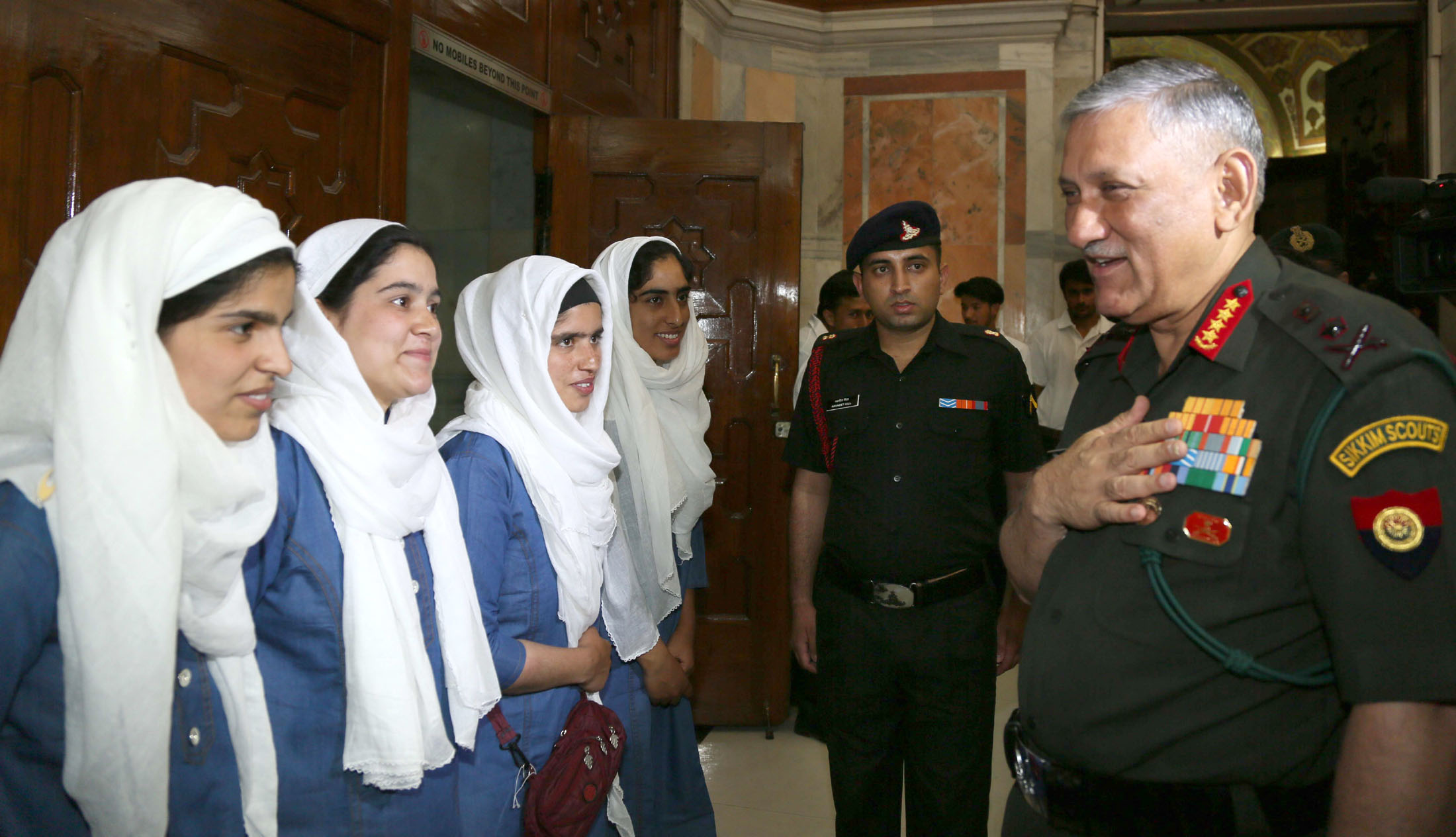
Students of Super-40 from Kashmir interacting with General Rawat in New Delhi, 2017.

Welfare initiatives under Operation Sadbhavana include infrastructure development, medical care, women and youth empowerment, educational tours and sports tournaments among other initiatives. Over 450 crore rupees (70 million US$) has been directly spent on this programme and more funding provided through donors. The projects are planned according to the needs and desires of the local population and are handed over to the state government after successful initiation. 'Operation Sadbhavana' is a resolve by the Indian army to come closer to the population in Jammu and Kashmir and develop mutual faith and trust which the army gets across the rest of India.

=== Background ===
Operation Sadbhavana was officially launched in 1998, especially in rural areas near the Line of Control (LOC) where insurgency and militancy had caused destruction to property and a sense of alienation among the people of Jammu and Kashmir from the rest of India.

=== Initiatives ===
Kashmir Super-30 & Super-40

In 2013, the Indian Army teamed up with the New Delhi-based NGO, Centre for Social Responsibility and Leadership (CSRL), to launch the Super-30 initiative along the lines of the highly acclaimed and successful Super-30 concept started by Abhayanand in Bihar. Over time the initiative included more students and was subsequently called the Army Super-40, and soon will become the Army Super-50. Nine students of the 2016-17 Army Super-40 batch cleared the difficult IIT-JEE advanced examination. Various Indian organizations have provided funding for this project including Power Grid India contributing for the first batch, the Rural Electrification Council (REC) contributing for the second batch and the TATA Relief Committee funding the third batch.

Schools

The Indian Army has established 53 English medium Army Goodwill Schools in places in Jammu and Kashmir such as Rajouri, Poonch, Boniyar, Uri (Baramulla), Khanabal (Anantnag), Karu (Leh), Kargil and Chandigam (Kupwara). Assistance has also been provided to approximately 2700 public schools. These army schools are known to provide undisturbed and good quality education even during times of unrest. Army Goodwill Schools operating under the shelter of Operation Sadbhavana are educating more than 10,000 students in the Kashmir Valley itself and over 14,000 students in Jammu and Kashmir.

Women Empowerment Centres

Here women are taught various skills, awareness is raised about health and birth control, information regarding banking and loan procedures is imparted, basic education is imparted including operating computers, fashion designing and craft related skills. Under this initiative centers such as the Women's Vocational Training Centre, Poonch, Usha Fashion Design School, Baramulla and Women Empowerment Centre, Baramulla have been set up.

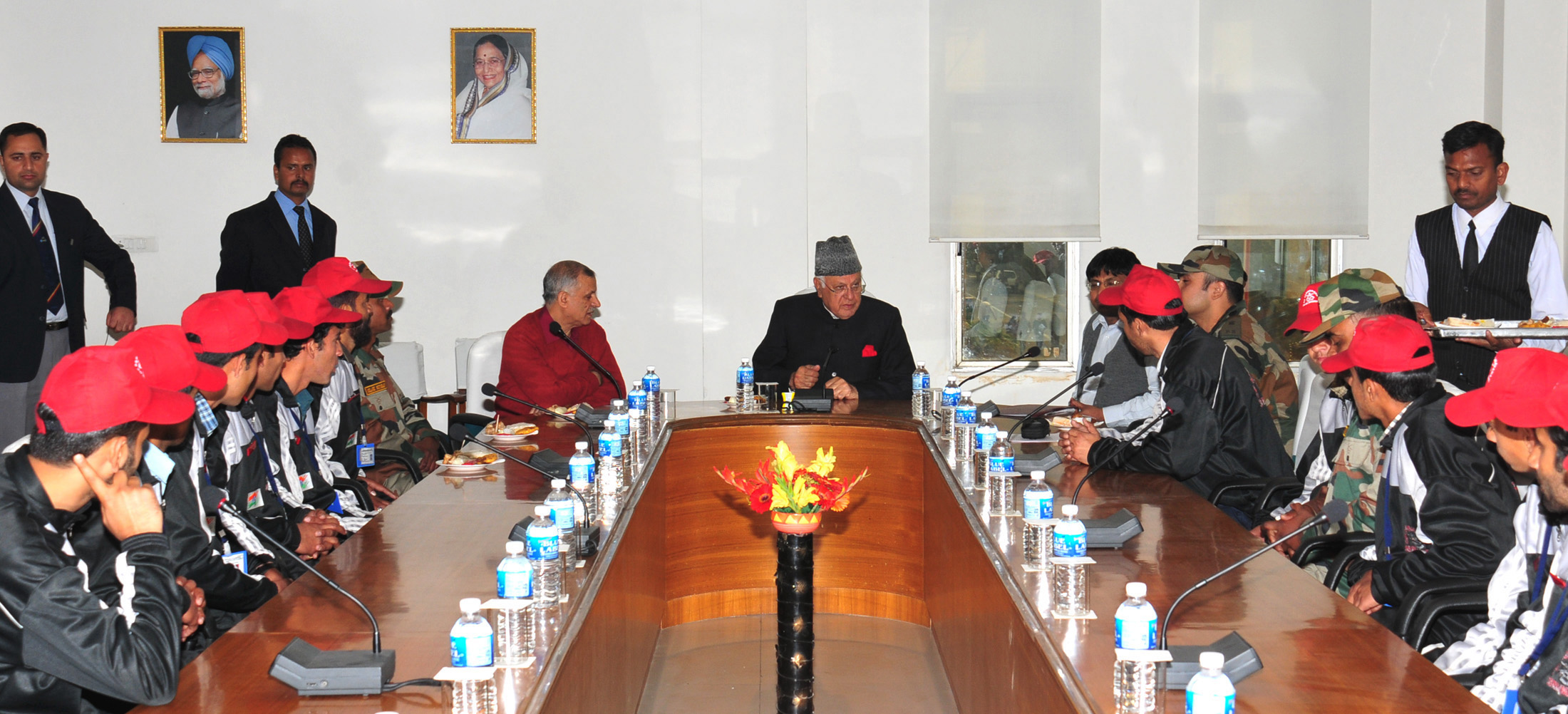
A group of students from Poonch & Rajouri, who are on educational tour under ‘Sadbhavana Operation’ meeting the Union Minister for New and Renewable Energy, Farooq Abdullah, in New Delhi on 17 February 2012.

Educational/Motivational Tours

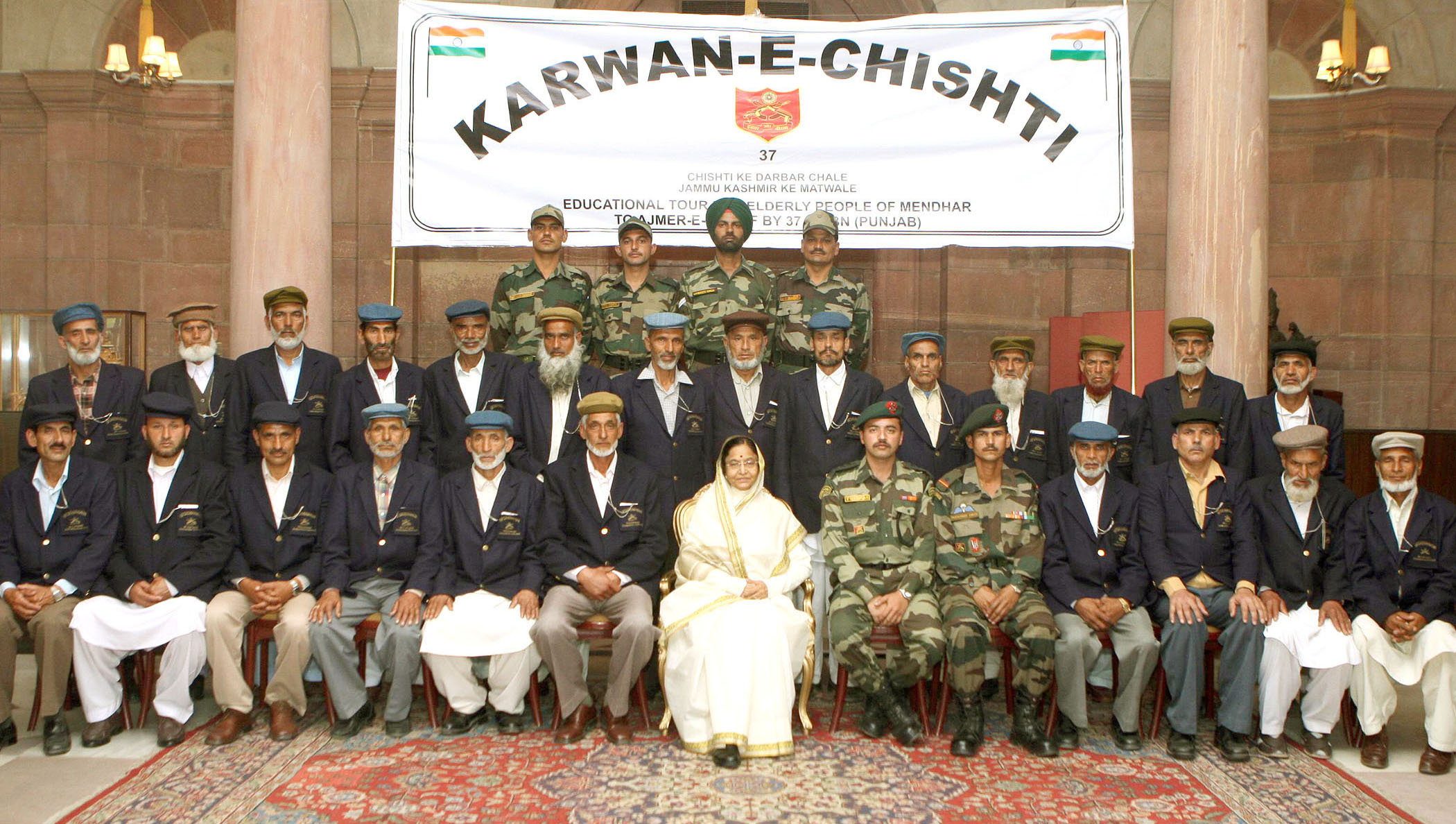
The 12th President of India, Pratibha Devisingh Patil with the members of the National Integration Tour for senior citizens of Operation Sadbhavana from Mendhar Tehsil, Jammu and Kashmir, in New Delhi on March 9, 2009

Between 2012 and 2015, the Indian army conducted over 250 educational, national integration and capacity building tours (CBTs) and in each tour around 30 members are accommodated. The members of the tour get to visit places such as Punjab, Dehradun, Kerala, Kolkata, Bhubaneswar, Gopalpur, Agra and New Delhi which each tour being unique in its own way. The students also get to interact with students in India, administrative and government officials, which sometimes also includes the President and Prime Minister of India, as well as other figures. For many of the Kashmiri children on tours, they get the opportunity for the first time to travel outside Kashmir.

Model Villages

Model Villages set up under Operation Sadbhavana include Chandigam Model Village, Lolab (Kupwara) and Sagra Model Village, Mendhar (Poonch).

Health Care

Medical Camps are conducted on a regular basis by the Indian army. A Military Hospital in Kargil has also been set up which also caters to civilians with various services being free of cost. The Pritam Spiritual Foundation (Poonch) under Operation Sadbhavana has provided artificial limbs free of cost to over 3100 people who have been victims of militancy, mine blasts or crossborder firing. Under operation Sadbhavana veterinary aid camps and free treatment to civil animals are also offered.

Sports

The Indian army organises various sporting events in Jammu and Kashmir in coordination with local sports bodies. Some events that has been conducted under this initiative includes the Kashmir Premier League, Baramulla Girls Badminton League, Baramulla Cricket Premier League, Kupwara Premier Football League, Gingle Volleyball League. As many thirty two teams participated in the cricket tournament even as sixteen teams participated in the football tournament.

== Operation Megh Rahat ==
In September 2014, Jammu and Kashmir witnessed severe flooding in many areas. The rainfall and flooding resulted in people dying on both sides of the border. The Indian Armed Forces were deployed to conduct search, rescue, relief (NDRF and other local bodies also coordinated efforts). Nearly 30,000 troops were deployed. By mid-September, over 200,000 people were rescued by the Armed forces. While the Army's Northern Command response was called Operation Megh Rahat, the Armed Forces assistance as a whole was called Mission Sahayata.

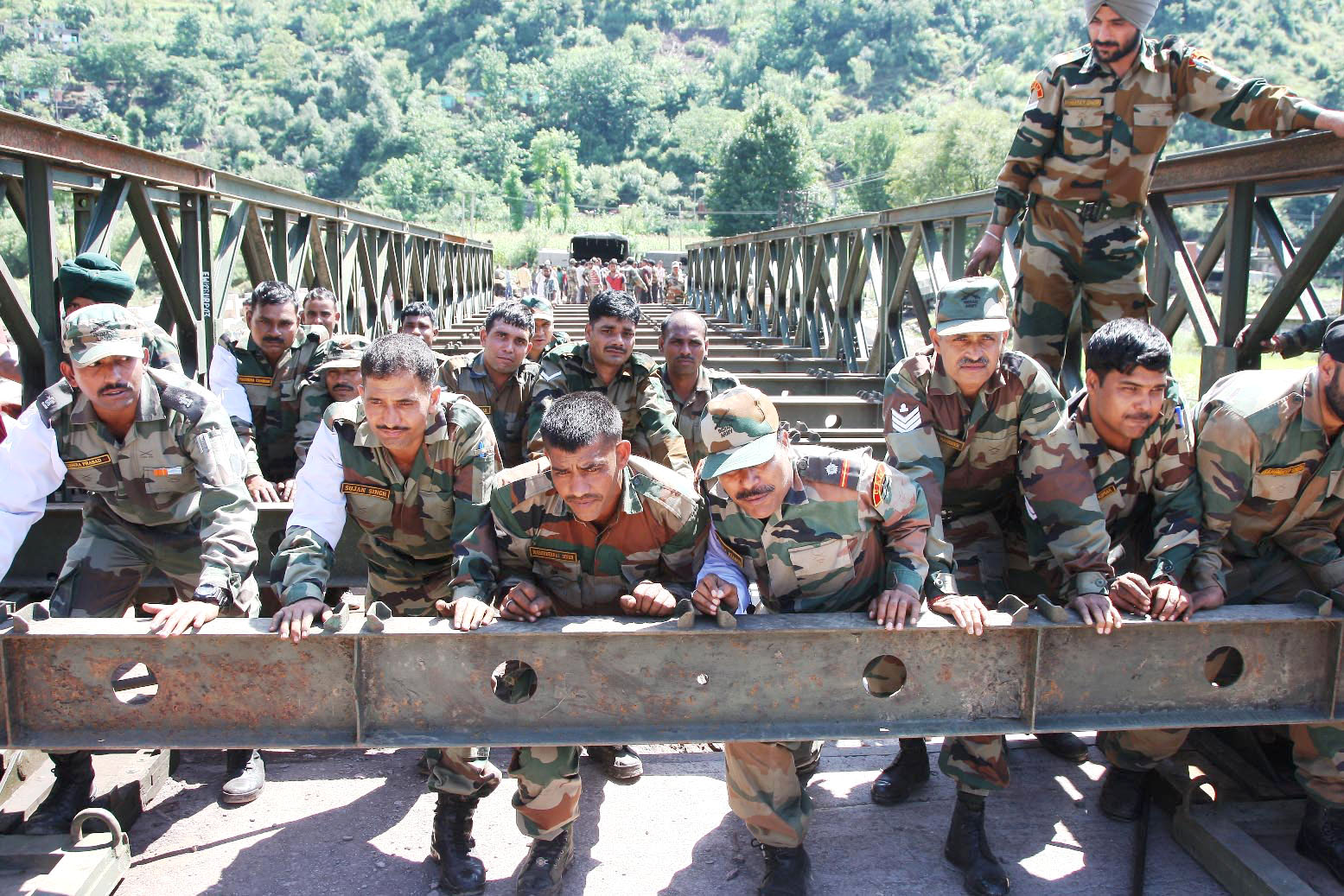
Army personnel building a bridge over Poonch River to re-establish connectivity in Poonch during September 2014.

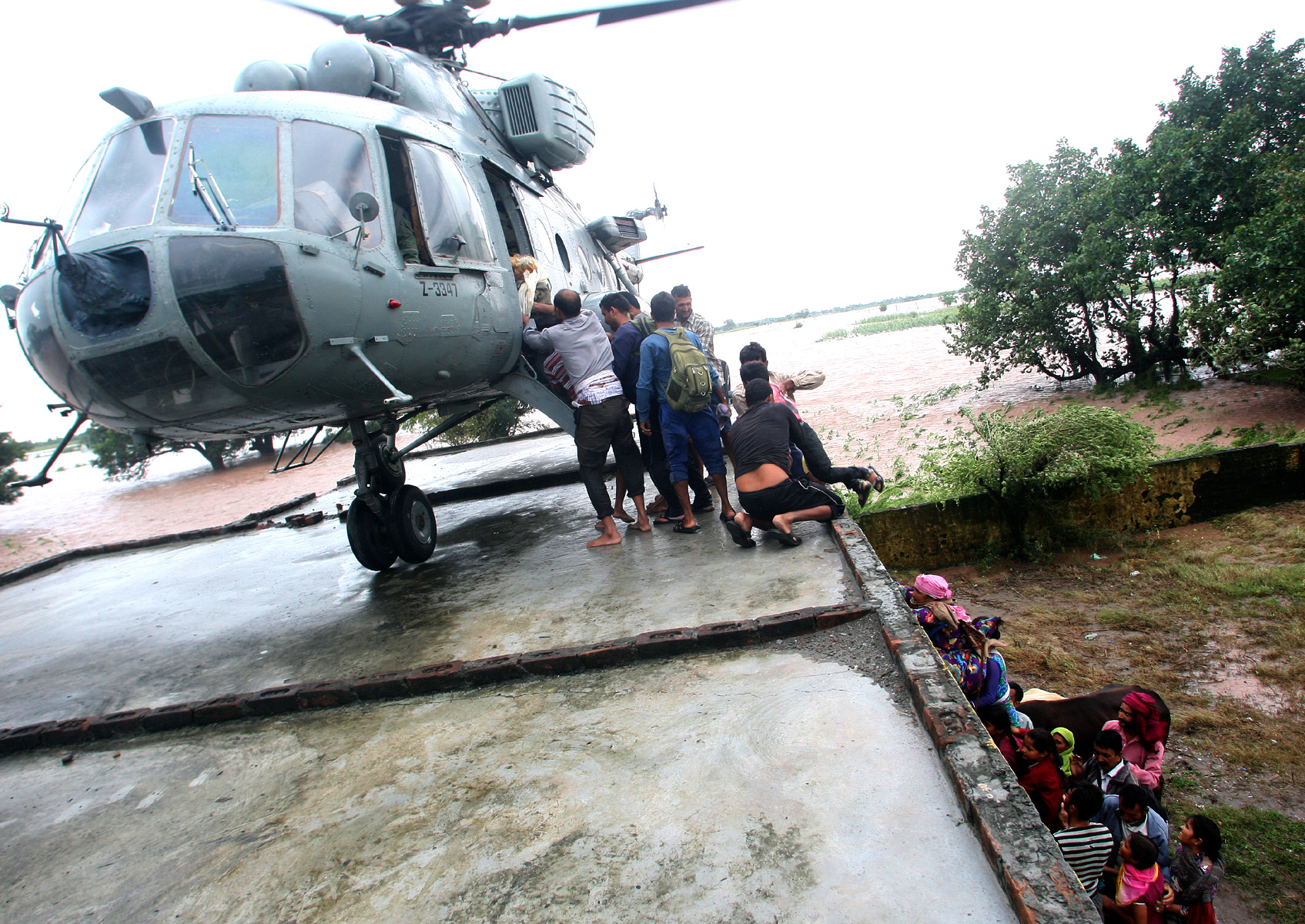
Indian Air Force helicopters carrying out rescue and evacuation of people marooned during the floods in Jammu and Kashmir

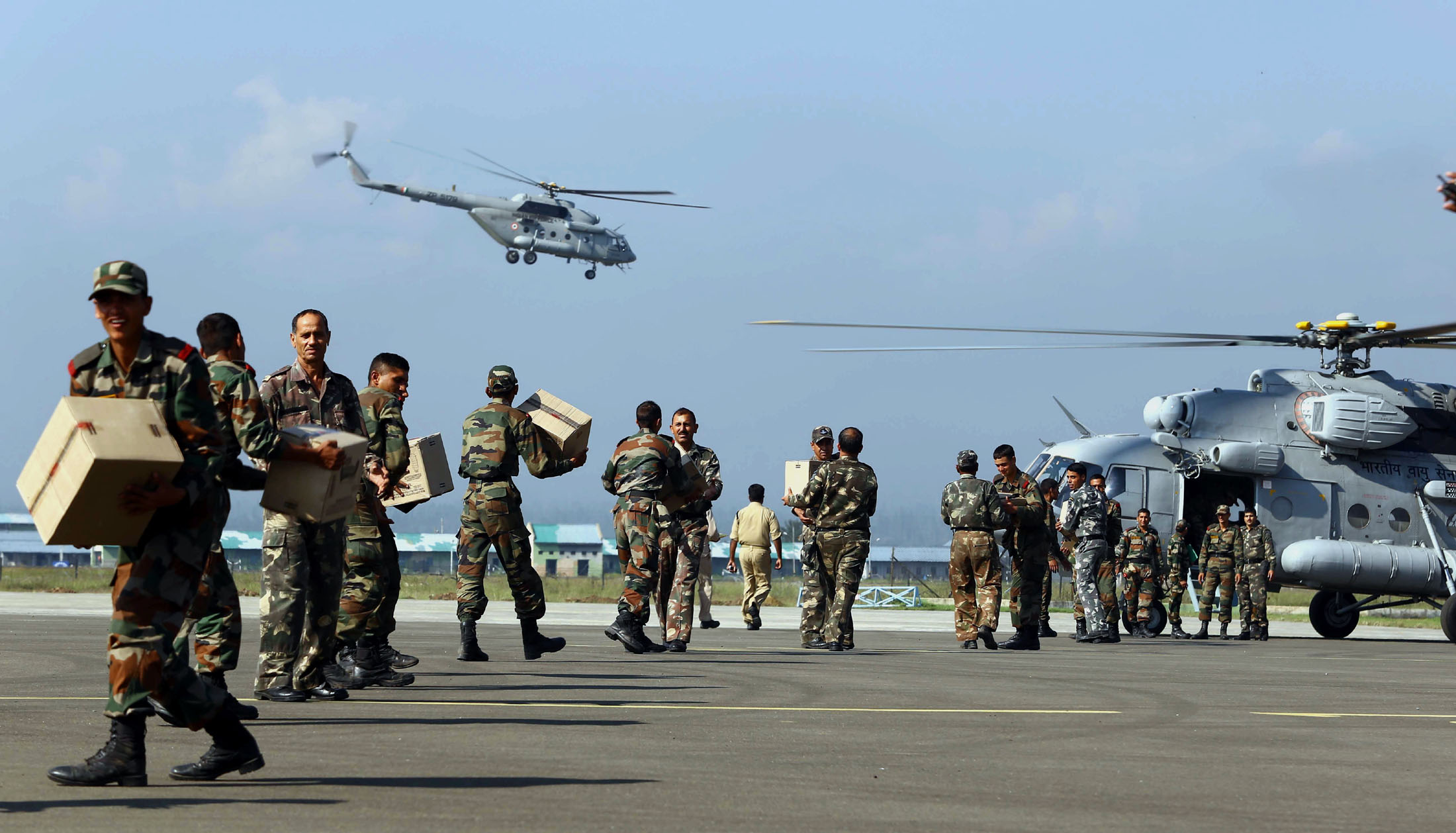
Relief materials are being loaded in an Indian Air Force helicopter for distribution among the flood affected people

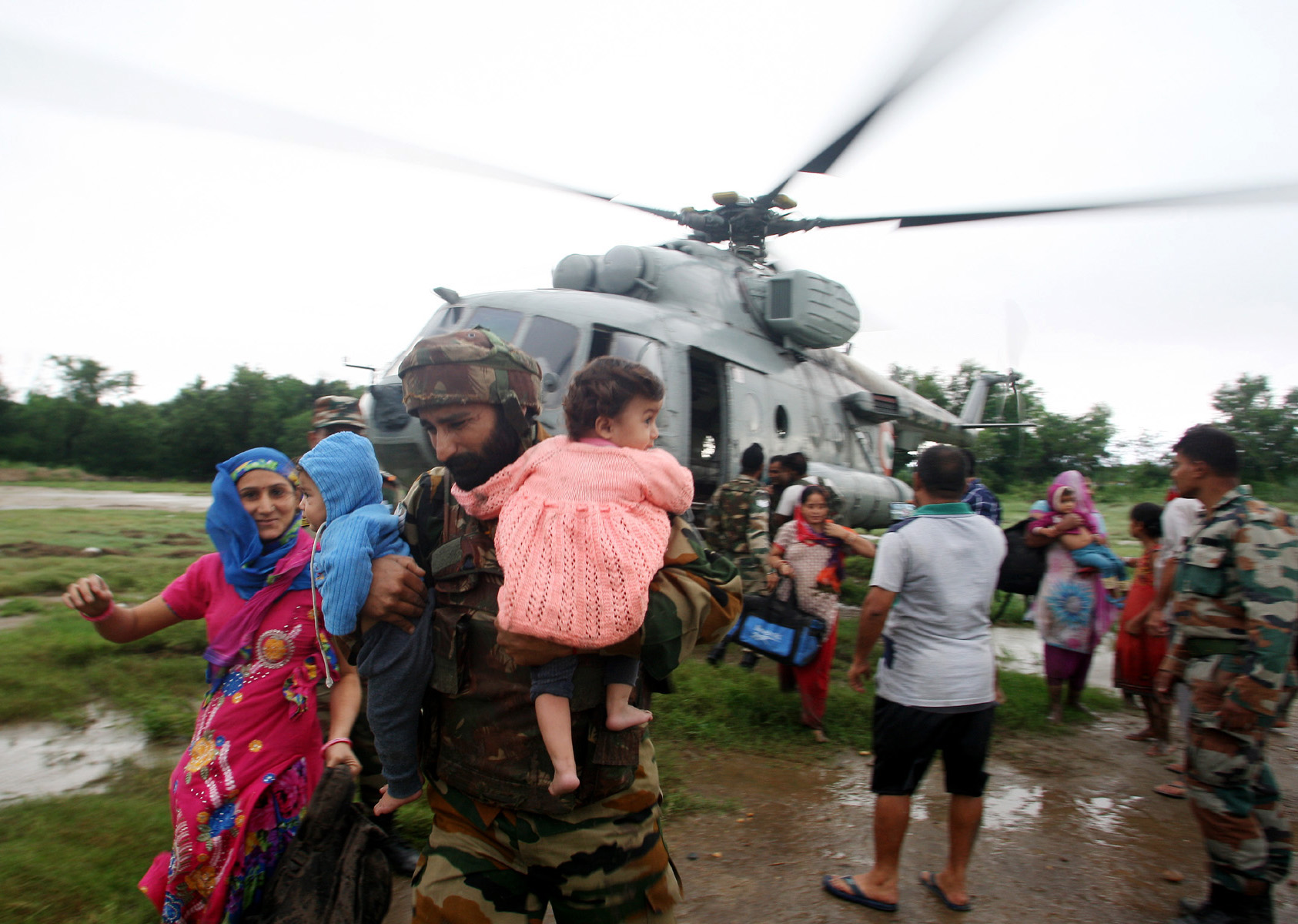
Armed forces carry out rescue and relief during the floods in Jammu and Kashmir

== Militant fatalities since 1990 ==
Encounters generally increase in the summer season when the snow melts on the high Himalayan peaks dividing Indian- and Pakistani-administered Kashmir, making it easier for trained militants to cross over into the Indian side. The Indian Army changes its strategy in summer which included redeployment as per summer infiltration routes along the LoC.

View source data.

== Timeline ==
=== Summary ===
A tabular view of the number of militants killed
Year	2017	2018	2020
January	12	13	1
February	10	6	0
March	9	23	0
April	8	20	9
May	16	18	11
June	21	25	29
July	27	11	
August	25	25	
September	16	31	
October	18	24	
November	19	37	
December	12	-	

A tabular view of the number of security personnels killed
Year	2017	2018	2020
January	0	4	
February	9	1	
March	1	5	
April	3	6	5
May	2	1	10
June	1	5	
July	0	4	
August	10	8	
September	0	3	
October	6	1	
November	5	4	
December	5	-	

=== 2017 ===
A total of 213 militants were killed under the operation by the Indian security forces in 2017. The security forces were able to persuade 82 youth to abandon militancy and come back. 78 security personnel were also killed in militant related violence.

January

- On 2 January, one militant was killed in the Tarzoo area of Haritar village in Sopore, Baramulla district.
- On 6 January, one Al-Badr militant, Muzzafar Ahmed, was killed in Machu area of Budgam district.
- On 10 January, one militant was killed in Hajin area of Bandipora district.
- On 11 January, two militants were killed during an infiltration bid in Betar Nala of Poonch Sector.
- On 15 January, three militants were killed in Pahalgam area of Anantnag district.
- On 18 January, one militant was killed in Hajin village of Bandipora district.
- On 24 January, two militants were killed in Hadoora area of Ganderbal district. Another militant was killed during an infiltration bid Sunderbani sector of Rajouri district.

February

- On 4 February, two militants were killed in Amargarh area of Baramulla district.
- On 11 February, four Hizbul Mujahideen and Lashkar-e-Taiba militants and two Indian Army soldiers were killed in Frisal village of Kulgam district.
- On 13 February, one militant and three Indian Army soldiers were killed in Hajin area of Bandipora district.
- On 14 February, three militants and an Indian Army major were killed in Hajan, Handwara district.
- On 22 February, three Indian Army soldiers of 44 Rashtriya Rifles unit were killed in an attack on army convoy by Hizbul Mujahideen militants in Shopian district.

March

- On 4 March, two Hizbul Mujahideen militants and a police constable were killed in Tral village of Pulwama district.
- On 9 March, two Lashkar-e-Taiba militants and a civilian were killed in Padgampora village of Pulwama district. Another Hizbul Mujahideen militant was killed near a police station in Bandipora district.
- On 15 March, three militants and a civilian were killed in Jugtiyal village of Kupwara district.
- On 22 March, one militant and three civilians were killed in Chadoora area of Budgam district.

April

- On 9 April, four militants were killed during an infiltration bid in Keran sector of Kupwara district.
- On 22 April, two Lashkar-e-Taiba militants were killed in Hayatpora village of Chadoora, Budgam district.
- On 26 April, two militants and three Indian Army soldiers were killed in an attack on an Indian Army garrison in Chowkibal's Panzgam area, Kupwara district.

May

- On 14 May, two Lashkar-e-Taiba militants were killed in Waripora village of Handwara, Kupwara district.
- On 20 May, two militants and two Indian Army soldiers were killed during an infiltration bid in Naugam sector of Kupwara district.
- On 26 May, six militants were killed during an infiltration bid in Rampur sector. Two Hizbul Mujahideen militants were killed in Saimuh near Hardumir, Tral, Pulwama district. Also, two militants of BAT were killed in Uri sector of Baramulla district.
- On 31 May, two militants were killed in Nathipora village of Sopore, Baramulla district.

June

- On 7 June, three militants and one Indian Army soldier were killed during an infiltration bid in Naugam sector of Kupwara district.
- On 9 June, five militants were killed during an infiltration bid in Uri sector of Baramulla district.
- On 10 June, one militant was killed during an infiltration bid in Gurez sector of Bandipora district.
- On 16 June, three Lashkar-e-Taiba militants, including Junaid Mattoo, were killed in Arwani village of Bijbihara, Anantnag District.
- On 20 June, two Hizbul Mujahideen militants were killed in Pazalpora village of Sopore, Baramulla district.
- On 21 June, three Lashkar-e-Taiba militants were killed in Kakapora area of Pulwama district.
- On 22 June, two militants were killed during an infiltration bid in Keran sector of Kupwara district.
- On 25 June, two Lashkar-e-Taiba militants were killed in Delhi Public School (DPS) complex in Srinagar.

July

- On 1 July, two Lashkar-e-Taiba militants and two civilians were killed in Brenti village of Anantnag district.
- On 3 July, three militants were killed in Bamnoo area of Pulwama district.
- On 9 July, three militants were killed during an infiltration bid in Naugam sector of Kupwara district.
- On 11 July, three Hizbul Mujahideen militants were killed in Radbugh village, Magam area of Budgam district.
- On 15 July, three militants were killed in Satora area of Tral.
- On 17 July, two militants were killed during an infiltration bid in Gurez sector of Bandipora district. Three Lashkar-e-Taiba militants involved in the 2017 Amarnath Yatra attack were also killed in Wanihama of Anantnag district.
- On 22 July, a militant was killed during an infiltration bid in Machil sector of Kupwara district.
- On 26 July, three militants were killed during an infiltration bid in Gurez sector of Bandipora district.
- On 29 July, two militants were killed in Tahab area of Pulwama district.
- On 31 July, a militant was killed in an infiltration bid in Rampur sector and another militant was killed in Turna village of Uri sector, Baramulla district.

August

- On 1 August, two Lashkar-e-Taiba militants, including Abu Dujana, and a civilian were killed in Hakripora village of Pulwama district.
- On 2 August, two militants were killed in Gopalpora area of Kulgam district.
- On 3 August, one Hizbul Mujahideen militant was killed at Kanibal in Bijbehara of Anantnag district.
- On 4 August, three Lashkar-e-Taiba militants were killed in Amargarh area of Sopore district.
- On 6 August, a Lashkar-e-Taiba militant was killed in Samboora area of Pulwama district.
- On 7 August, five militants were killed during an n infiltration bid in Machil sector of Kupwara district.
- On 9 August, three Ansar Ghazwat-ul-Hind militants were killed in Gulab Bagh area of Tral, Pulwama district.
- On 12 August, three Hizbul Mujahideen militants including, Yaseen Itoo, and two Indian Army soldiers were killed in Awneera village of Shopian district.
- On 16 August, a Lashkar-e-Taiba district commander was killed in Pulwama district.
- On 22 August, a militant was killed in Haphruda forest area of Handwara, Kupwara district.
- On 26 August, three militants, four CRPF personnel and four J&K policemen were killed in an attack on a CRPF camp in Pulwama district.

September

- On 1 September, one Lashkar-e-Taiba militant was killed in Tantray Pora of Kulgam district. The militant was suspected to be involved in the killing of Lt Ummer Fayaz.
- On 4 September, two Lashkar-e-Taiba militants were killed in Shanker Gund Brath area of Sopore district.
- On 9 September, one Hizbul Mujahideen militant was killed in Reban village of Sopore district.
- On 10 September, two Hizbul Mujahideen militants were killed in Khudwani area of Kulgam district. Two more Hizbul Mujahideen militants were killed and one surrendered in Barbugh area of Shopian district.
- On 14 September, two Lashkar-e-Taiba militants were killed in Aribagh area of Nowgam. One of the militant killed was Abu Ismail who was responsible for the 2017 Amarnath Yatra attack Another Hizbul Mujahideen militant was arrested from Bandipora district.
- 2 militants were killed in an infiltration bid in Machil sector of Kupwara district on 15 September.
- On 25 September, four militants were killed at Kalgai village in Uri sector. Another militant was killed in the Zorawar area of Uri district.

October

- Four Jaish-e-Mohammed militants and one BSF soldier were killed in an attack on a 182nd battalion (BSF) camp near Srinagar airport on 1 October.
- On 2 October, two militants were killed in an infiltration bid in Rampur sector, Baramulla district and three militant were killed in another bid in Tangdhar sector, Kupwara district.
- On 9 October, one Jaish-e-Mohammed militant was killed by Special Operations Group in Ladoora, Baramulla district and another Jaish-e-Mohammed militant was killed in Gatipora, Shopian district.
- Two militants of unknown affiliation and two Garud commandos were killed in Hajin, Bandipora district on 10 October.
- On 13 October, two Lashkar-e-Taiba militants, including a commander, were killed in Litter, Pulwama district and one Hizbul Mujahideen militant was arrested in Tral, Pulwama district.
- One police driver, Khurshid Ahmad, was killed and another constable injured on 14 October during a militant attack in Damhal Hanjipora, Kulgam district.
- On 16 October, a former sarpanch, Ramzan Sheikh, was killed by three militants in Imam Sahib, Shopian district.
- A police officer was killed by militants in Tral, Pulwama district.
- On 21 October, a militant was killed in Langate, Kupwara district.
- Two militants and one SOG personnel were killed on 28 October in Hajin, Bandipora district.

November

- Five CRPF personnel of the 96th battalion were injured when militants opened fired on their vehicle on 1 November in Anantnag district.
- On 2 November, a Hizbul Mujahideen militant and two Indian Army soldiers were killed while one CRPF personnel was injured Samboora, Pulwama district.
- On 3 November, an infiltration bid along the LOC was foiled and a militant was killed in Kupwara district.
- One Hizbul Mujahideen militant and one Indian army soldier were killed on 14 November in Qazigund, Kulgam district.
- On 18 November, six Lashkar-e-Taiba militants and a Garud commando were killed in Hajin, Bandipora district. This included Zargam Bhai and Mehmood Bhai, Lashkar-e-Taiba commanders, and Owaid, nephew of Zakiur Rehman Lakhvi.
- On 20 November, three Lashkar-e-Taiba militants were killed in Magam, Budgam district. Another militant was killed in forest area of Tral, Pulwama district.
- On 22 November, one militant and one Indian army soldier were killed during an infiltration bid along the LOC.
- On 24 November, one Lashkar-e-Taiba militant was arrested from forest area of Kupwara district.
- On 30 November, four Jaish-e-Mohammed militants were killed in Pakherpora, Budgam district and a Lashkar-e-Taiba militant was killed in Sopore, Baramulla district. One security force personnel was also injured.

December

- On 4 December, three Lashkar-e-Taiba militants involved in the 2017 Amarnath Yatra attack were killed in Anantnag district. One militant who fled from the site was arrested.
- On 10 December, three Lashkar-e-Taiba militants were killed in Unisoo village of Handwara, Kupwara district.
- Two militants, including Tanveer Bhat, were killed on 18 December in Shopian district.
- A Jaish-e-Mohammed militant, Noor Mohammad Tantray, was killed on 25 December in Pulwama district.
- Three Jaish-e-Mohammed militants and five CRPF personnel were killed in an attack on the group training center of 185th battalion in Lethpora, Pulwama district.

=== 2018 ===
As of 28 November 2018, a total of 222 militants and 41 security personnel have been killed in operations. A unilateral ceasefire was declared by the Indian Government from 14 May to 17 June where the security forces were asked not to launch new operations during Ramadan.

Date	Number of militants		Militants affiliation	Number of security forces killed	Security forces affiliation	Number of civilians killed	Area	Notes	References
Date	Killed	Arrested	Militants affiliation	Number of security forces killed	Security forces affiliation	Number of civilians killed	Area	Notes	References
6 January	-	-	Jaish-e-Mohammed	4	Jammu and Kashmir Police	-	Sopore, Baramulla district	Killed in an IED blast	
8 January	3	-	-	-		-	Patrigam, Budgam district		
9 January	2	-	Hizbul Mujahideen	-		-	Kokernag, Anantnag district	9 sympathizers arrested	
15 January	6	-	Jaish-e-Mohammed	-	Indian Army, CRPF, J&K Police	-	Uri sector, Baramulla district	Killed in an infiltration bid	
24 January	2	-	Hizbul Mujahideen	-	44 RR, 14 CRPF, J&K Police	1	Dairoo's Chaigund, Shopian district		
12 February	2	-	Lashkar-e-Taiba	1	23 CRPF	-	Karan Nagar, Srinagar	Attack on a CRPF camp	
12 February	2	-	Lashkar-e-Taiba	-		-	Harpora area, Shopian district		
26 February	1	-	Hizbul Mujahideen	-		-	Tral, Pulwama district	Attack on Tral police station	
27 February	1	-	Lashkar-e-Taiba	-		-	Hajin, Bandipora district		
4 March	1	-	-	-		-	Phoan, Shopian district	3 accomplices also killed	
5 March	1	-	Jaish-e-Mohammed	-	50 RR	-	Hatwar, Awantipora, Pulwama district	Mastermind of the 2018 Sunjuwan attack	
11 March	3		Tehreek-ul-Mujahideen	-	Indian Army, CRPF, SOG	-	Hakru, Anantnag district		
15 March	2	-	-	-		-	Balhama, Pulwama district		
20 March	4		-	-		-	Arampora, Kupwara district		
22 March	5	-	Lashkar-e-Taiba	5	Indian Army, TA, CRPF, J&K Police	-	Halmatpora, Kupwara district		
23 March	2	-	Jaish-e-Mohammed	-	19 RR, CRPF, J&K Police	-	Dooru, Anantnag district		
24 March	1	-	-	-			Arizal village, Budgam district		
28 March	4	-	-	-			Sunderbani, Rajouri district		
1 April	5	-	Lashkar-e-Taiba, Hizbul Mujahideen	3		3	Kachdoora, Shopian district	Ishfaq Malik and Rayees Thokar, responsible for the murder of Ummer Fayaz	
1 April	7	-	Lashkar-e-Taiba, Hizbul Mujahideen	-		1	Draggad village, Shopian district	Ishfaq Malik and Rayees Thokar, responsible for the murder of Ummer Fayaz	
1 April	1	1	Lashkar-e-Taiba, Hizbul Mujahideen	-		-	Dialgam, Anantnag district	Ishfaq Malik and Rayees Thokar, responsible for the murder of Ummer Fayaz	
6 April	1	-		-		-	Kangan village, Pulwama district		
6 April	-	1	Lashkar-e-Taiba	-	41 RR, 98 CRPF, J&K Police	-	Halmatpora, Kupwara district		
11 April			Lashkar-e-Taiba	1		4	Wani Mohalla, Khudwani Kulgam	Militants escaped	
24 April	4	-	Hizbul Mujahideen	2	42 RR, CRPF, J&K Police	-	Tral, Pulwama district		
30 April	2	-	Hizbul Mujahideen	-	44 RR, CRPF, J&K Police	-	Drabgam, Pulwama district		
5 May	3	-	Lashkar-e-Taiba	-	CRPF, SOG	-	Chattabal, Srinagar district		
6 May	5	-	Hizbul Mujahideen	-	23 Para, 44 RR, 34 RR, 3 RR, CRPF, SOG	-	Badigam, Shopian district		
8 May	-	4	-	-	-	-	Sopore, Baramulla district	In addition, 7 OGW's arrested	
19 May	3	-	-	-	-	-	Handwara, Kupwara district		
26 May	5	-	-	-	Indian Army	-	Tangdhar sector, Kupwara district		
28 May	-	-	-	1	50 RR	1	Kakapora, Pulwama district	Attack on 50 RR camp	
31 May	2	-	-	-	32 RR	-	Handwara, Kupwara district		
3 June	1	-	-	-	-	-	Keran sector, Kupwara district		
6 June	3	-	-	-	Indian Army	-	Macchil sector, Kupwara district		
7 June	-	-	-	1	6 RR	-	Keran sector, Kupwara district		
10 June	6	-	-	-	Indian Army	-	Keran sector, Kupwara district		
12 June	-	-	-	2	J&K Police	-	Pulwama		
14 June	2	-	-	1	4 RR, 22 RR, 52 RR, 18 RR, 28 RR, 27 RR, 31 RR, 3 Para	-	Panar, Bandipora district		
18 June	2	-	-	-	4 RR, 22 RR, 52 RR, 18 RR, 28 RR, 27 RR, 31 RR, 3 Para	-	Panar, Bandipora district		
20 June	3	-	Jaish-e-Mohammed	-	RR, CRPF, SOG	-	Tral, Pulwama district		
22 June	4	-	ISJK	1	RR, CRPF, SOG	1	Srigufwara, Anantnag district		
24 June	2	1	Lashkar-e-Taiba	-	RR, CRPF, SOG	1	Chadderbhan, Kulgam district		
29 June	1	-	-	-	Indian Army	-	Trehgam, Kupwara district		
29 June	1	-	-	-	Indian Army	1	Chatapora, Pulwama district		
6 July	-	-	-	1	J&K Police	-	Shopian district		
8 July	1	-	-	-	-	-	Handwara, Kupwara district		
10 July	2	-	Jaish-e-Mohammed	-	RR, CRPF, SOG	1	Kundullan, Shopian district		
11 July	1	-	-	1	Para SF	-	Menganwar, Kupwara district		
15 July	1	-	-	-	Indian Army	-	Safawali Gali, Kupwara district		
15 July	-	-	-	1	J&K Police	-	Pulwama district		
21 July	3	-	-	1	Indian Army	-	Redwani, Kulgam district		
24 July	2	-	Lashkar-e-Taiba	-	Indian Army	-	Lal Chowk, Anantnag district		
26 July	1	-	-	-	Indian Army	-	Sodul village, Handwara, Kupwara district		
2 August	2	-	Hizbul Mujahideen	-	Indian Army	-	Kumrial, Kupwara district		
3 August	2	-	-	-	Indian Army	-	Sopore, Baramulla district		
3 August	5	-	-	-	Indian Army	-	Kiloora, Shopian district		
7 August	2	-	-	4	Indian Army	-	Gurez sector, Bandipora district		
8 August	5	-	-	-	Para, RR, SOG	-	Rafiabad, Baramulla district		
18 August	3	-	-	-	Indian Army	-	Tangdhar sector, Kupwara district		
19 August	1	-	-	-	Indian Army	-	Uri sector, Baramulla district		
23 August	1	-	Jaish-e-Mohammed	-	Indian Army	-	Vailoo, Kokernag, Anantnag district		
28 August	2	-	Hizbul Mujahideen	-	Indian Army	-	Khanabal, Anantnag district		
29 August	-	-	Jaish-e-Mohammed	4	J&K Police	-	Bongam, Shopian district		
30 August	2	-	-	-	Indian Army	-	Hajin, Bandipora district		
1 September	3	-	-	1	Indian Army	-	Danna, Bandipora district		
10 September	2	-	Lashkar-e-Taiba	-	Indian Army	-	Handwara, Kupwara district		
13 September	2	-	Jaish-e-Mohammed	-	Indian Army	-	Chinkipora, Baramulla district		
13 September	3	-	Jaish-e-Mohammed	-	Indian Army	-	Jhajjar-Kotli forest, Reasi district		
15 September	5	-	Hizbul Mujahideen, Lashkar-e-Taiba	-	Indian Army	-	Chowgam, Kulgam district		
21 September	5	-	Lashkar-e-Taiba	-	Indian Army	-	Sumblar, Bandipora district		
23 September	1	-	-	-	Indian Army	-	Tral, Pulwama district		
24 September	5	-	-	1	Indian Army	-	Tangdhar sector, Kupwara district		
25 September	2	-	Jaish-e-Mohammed	-	Indian Army	-	Tujjar, Sopore, Baramulla district		
27 September	1	-	Lashkar-e-Taiba	1	Indian Army	-	Gazigund, Anantnag district		
27 September	2	-	Hizbul Mujahideen	-	Indian Army	-	Panzam, Budgam district		
9 October	-	4	Hizbul Mujahideen	-	J&K Police		Pulwama district		
11 October	2	-	Hizbul Mujahideen	-	Indian Army	-	Handwara, Kupwara district		
12 October	1	1	Hizbul Mujahideen	-	55 RR, CRPF, SOG	-	Babagund, Pulwama district		
17 October	1	-	Tehreek-ul-Mujahideen	-	Indian Army	-	Dougam, Pulwama district		
18 October	3	-	-	-	Indian Army	-	Uri sector, Baramulla district		
20 October	3	-	Jaish-e-Mohammed	-	Indian Army	3	Laroo, Kulgam district		
23 October	2	-	Hizbul Mujahideen	-	55 RR, CRPF, SOG	-	Nowgam, Srinagar		
25 October	2	-	-	-	Indian Army, SOG	-	Authoora, Baramulla district		
25 October	4	-	-	-	Indian Army, SOG	-	Bijbehara's Arwani, Anantnag district		
25 October	2	-	-	1	Indian Army	-	Sopore, Baramulla district		
30 October	2	-	Jaish-e-Mohammed	-	Indian Army	-	Chaanketaar, Tral, Pulwama district		
31 October	2	-	-	-	53 RR	-	Zagoo, Khansahib, udgam district		
1 November	1	-	-	-	Indian Army	-	Handwara, Kupwara district		
2 November	-	1	Al-Badr	-	J&K Police	-	Handwara, Kupwara district		
3 November	2	-	Hizbul Mujahideen	-	Indian Army	-	Khudpora, Shopian district		
5 November	2	-	Hizbul Mujahideen	-	Indian Army	-	Safanagri, Zainapora, Shopian district		
9 November	2	-	Hizbul Mujahideen	-	Indian Army	-	Tikken, Pulwama district		
11 November	1	-	Jaish-e-Mohammed	1	Indian Army	-	Chattipra, Handwara, Kupwara district		
13 November	1	-	-	-	Indian Army	-	Akhnoor sector, Jammu district		
13 November	2	-	-	-	Indian Army	-	Keran sector, Kupwara district		
17 November	2	-	Al-Badr	-	Indian Army, J&K Police	-	Rebian, Shopian district		
19 November	4		Hizbul Mujahideen	1	23 Para, CRPF		Nadigam, Shopian district		
23 November	6		Hizbul Mujahideen, Lashkar-e-Taiba	-	3 RR, SOG	-	Sekipora, Bijbhera, Anantnag district		
25 November	6	-	Hizbul Mujahideen, Lashkar-e-Taiba	1	34 RR, CRPF, SOG	-	Hipura Batagund, Shopian district	Operation Batagund	
25 November	1	1	Jaish-e-Mohammed	-	Indian Army	-	Khrew, Awantipora, Pulwama district		
26 November	2	-	-	1	RR, 163 CRPF, SOG	-	Redwani, Kulgam district		
26 November	1	-	-	-	Indian Army, CRPF, J&K Police	-	Hafoo, Tral, Pulwama district		
27 November	2	-	Lashkar-e-Taiba	-	Indian Army, CRPF, J&K Police	-	Kuthpora, Budgam district		
28 November	2	-	Hizbul Mujahideen	-	55 RR, 185 CRPF, 130 CRPF, SOG	-	Sharshali, Pulwama district		

=== 2020 ===
Indian security forces, between January and 19 June, launched several operations in which 102 terrorists were killed. Lt Gen BS Raju mentioned in a press conference that normalcy will return in the valley within few months and all the terrorists will be eliminated. In the first week of April, Operation Randori Behak (1 April to 5 April) resulted in the deaths of five para commandos from 4 Para, the same commandos which had taken part in the 2016 'surgical strikes'. Among those para commandos was Junior Commissioned Officer Sanjiv Kumar, KC, who died in action on 5 April. (Note: Kumar led a team of four soldiers during Operation Randori Behak. For his leadership during the operation, he was posthumously awarded the Kirti Chakra.)

Operation Randori Behak resulted in the most deaths in 2020: five terrorists and five soldiers. On 2 May, following Pakistani border firing and the deaths of Indian security forces, the United Nations spokesperson said that "Antonio Guterres' ceasefire appeal is global".

May onwards, Indian troops have been part of the 2020 China–India skirmishes.

Date	Number of militants		Militants affiliation	Number of security forces killed	Security forces affiliation	Number of civilians killed	Area	Notes	References
Date	Killed	Arrested	Militants affiliation	Number of security forces killed	Security forces affiliation	Number of civilians killed	Area	Notes	References
15 January	1	-	Hizbul Mujahideen	-	J&K Police, Indian Army (RR), other security agencies	-	Tantna village, Gundana tehsil, Doda	Haroon Abbas Wani, HB district commander	
5 April	5	-	LeT - The Resistance Front (TRF)	5	4 Para SF	-	Keran, Kupwara	Infiltration during COVID-19 pandemic, Operation Randori Behak	
22 April	4	-	-	-	-	-	Malhura Zanpora village, Shopian		
2 May	2	-	-	5 (4+1)	Indian Army, J&K Police	-	Changimul, Handwara, Kupwara district,	Chinese type 56 assault rifles recovered	
4 May	-	-	-	3	CRPF	-			
6 May	2	-	Hizbul Mujahideen	-	J&K Police, Indian Army, paramilitary	-	Sarshali village, Khrew, Awantipora	Riyaz Naikoo killed	
16 May	-	-	-	1	CRPF, J&K Police	-	Frisal chowk in Yaripora, Kulgam		
17 May	1	-	Hizbul Mujahideen	1	Indian Army	-	Doda	Tahir Ahmad Bhat killed; associate of Haroon Abbas Wani who was killed on 15 January 2020	
19 May	2	-	Hizbul Mujahideen	-	J&K Police, CRPF	3	Nawakadal, Srinagar	Ashraf Sehrai's son, Junaid Sehrai, a top Hizbul commander. 12 houses damaged, 3 injured civilians later died.	
24/25 May	2	-	-	-	Kulgam Police, 34 RR and CRPF 18 Bn	-	Khurd-Hanjipora area, Manzgam, Kulgam		
27 May	-	-	Hizbul/ Jaish-e-Mohammed	-	J&K Police, CRPF & Indian Army	-	Pulwama	Car with 40 kg IED captured, driver escapes	
30 May	2	-	-	-	J&K Police, Indian Army, CRPF	-	Wanpora area, Kulgam		
31 May to 1 June	13	-	-	-	Indian Army	-	Kalal village, Naushera sector Rajouri	Search operations also by Border Security Force and police.	
2 June	2	-	Jaish-e-Mohammed	-	Security forces	-	Pulwama		
3 June	3	-	Jaish-e-Mohammed	-	Security forces	-	Kangan, Pulwama	Fauji Bhai alias Abdul Rehman, a Jaish bomb expert, also participated in Afghanistan war, killed	
7 June	5	-	Hizbul Mujahideen	-	Army, CRPF and Shopian Police	-	Reban village, Pinjora, Shopian		
8 June	4	-	Hizbul Mujahideen	-	J&K Police, Indian Army, CRPF	-	Pinjora, Shopian	12 hour encounter	
24 July	-	-	-	-	Indian Army	-	Hathlanga, Baramulla	Arms and ammunition including AK47s, 5 Chinese pistol recovered during search operation	
25 July	2	-	LeT	-	Joint operation	-	Ranbirgarh, Srinagar	Operation Ranbergad	

== See also ==
- Timeline of Kashmir Conflict
- Insurgency in Kashmir
- 2016 Uri attack
- India–Pakistan border skirmishes (2014–2015)
- India–Pakistan military confrontation (2016–present)
- Indian Armed Forces and the Jammu and Kashmir floods, 2014
