= Aragam =

Village in Jammu and Kashmir, India

Coordinates: 34.377°N 74.685°E

Aragam book village is a village in the Himalayan region of North Kashmir. It is located about 58 kilometres (36 mi) from Srinagar on the route from Srinagar to Bandipore. Aragam is located on the banks of Wular Lake and surrounded by wooded mountains on three sides. The location/village code is 002767. Aragam village is located in Bandipora Tehsil of Bandipore district in Jammu and Kashmir, India. It is situated 9 kilometres (5.6 mi) away from Bandipora, which is both district and sub-district headquarters of Aragam From then village is home to thousands of books related to literature, biogoraphies, fiction and non fiction books.

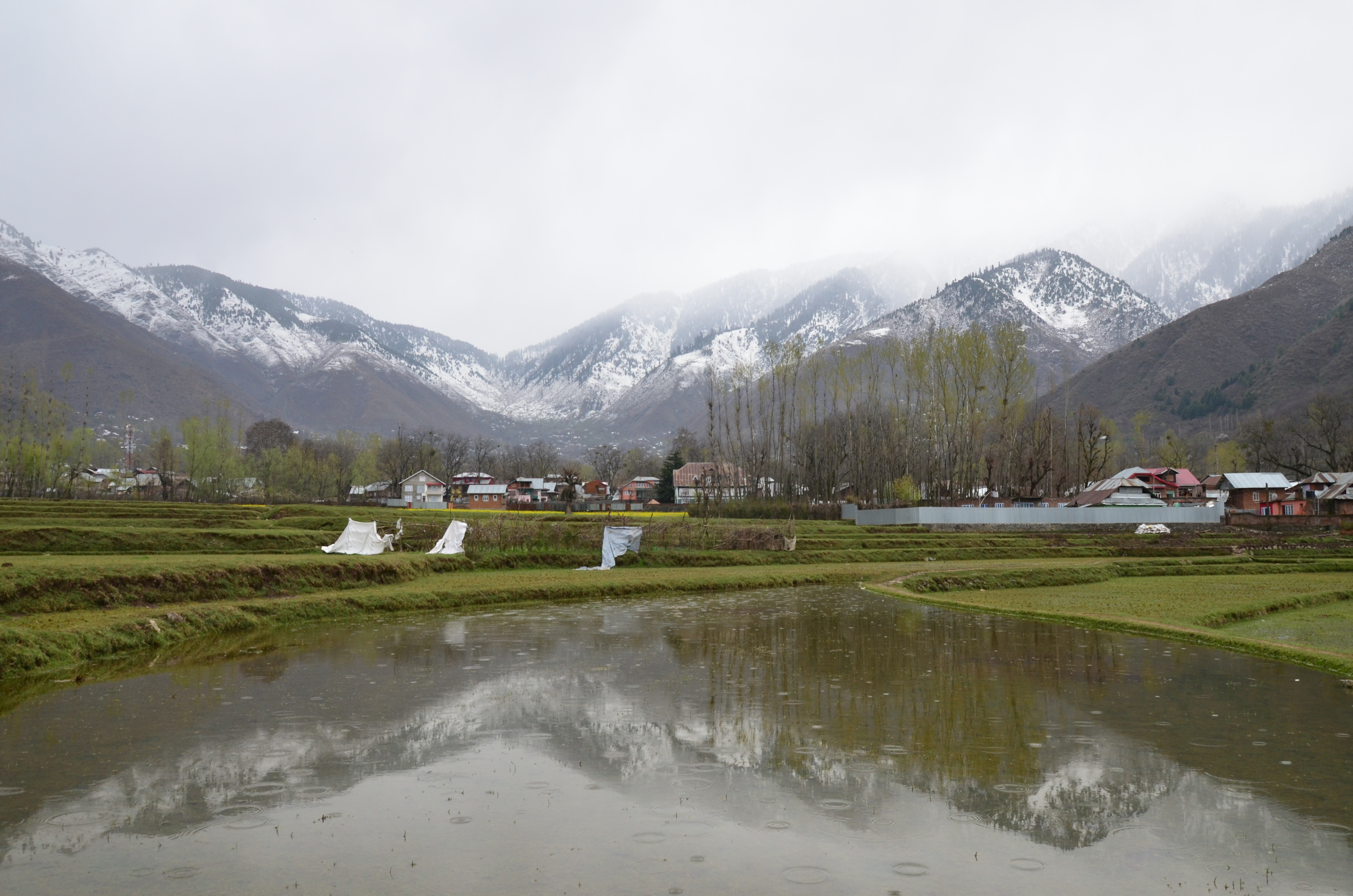
Aragam village with snow-clad mountains in the backdrop

== Demography ==
As per 2009 stats, Aragam village is itself a gram panchayat and the total area of village is 226.2 hectares (559 acres). Aragam has a total population of 3,020 with about 505 houses.

== History ==
The village derives its name from a stream ("Ara/Ar'e") which flows through the village. Adjacent to the village are Animbar, Fakhnar and Langmarg forests that are known for their vast grazing grounds and possess a lively pastoral life during summers. The surrounding mountains also support pine and deodar forests, while as apple, cherry, walnut, chinar, and popular trees can be spotted in the village lands. Rice constitutes the main staple crop of the village although isolated paddy, maize and some oilseed are also grown in some pockets.

== Education ==
Education has always thrived in the village and the village is known to possess one of the oldest schools in the district, which was later upgraded to a Higher Secondary level. Besides that many private institutions have also played a very important role in imparting education to the people of this village and the adjacent villages as well. Besides that Aragam also has a Maktaba Taleem Ul Quran, a school for imparting religious education to both boys and girls. Aragam is also known to have an old grand mosque the Markazi Jamia Masjid where congregational Friday Prayers are taking place from August 1956, and the same was reconstructed in the year 2021. Besides housing 4 more mosques other than the Central Mosque the Aragam village also has a couple of Hindu temples as well. In March 2024, the village was made into a book village by a Pune NGO.

== Notable people ==
- Lala Aragami, poet and Sufi

== Gallery ==
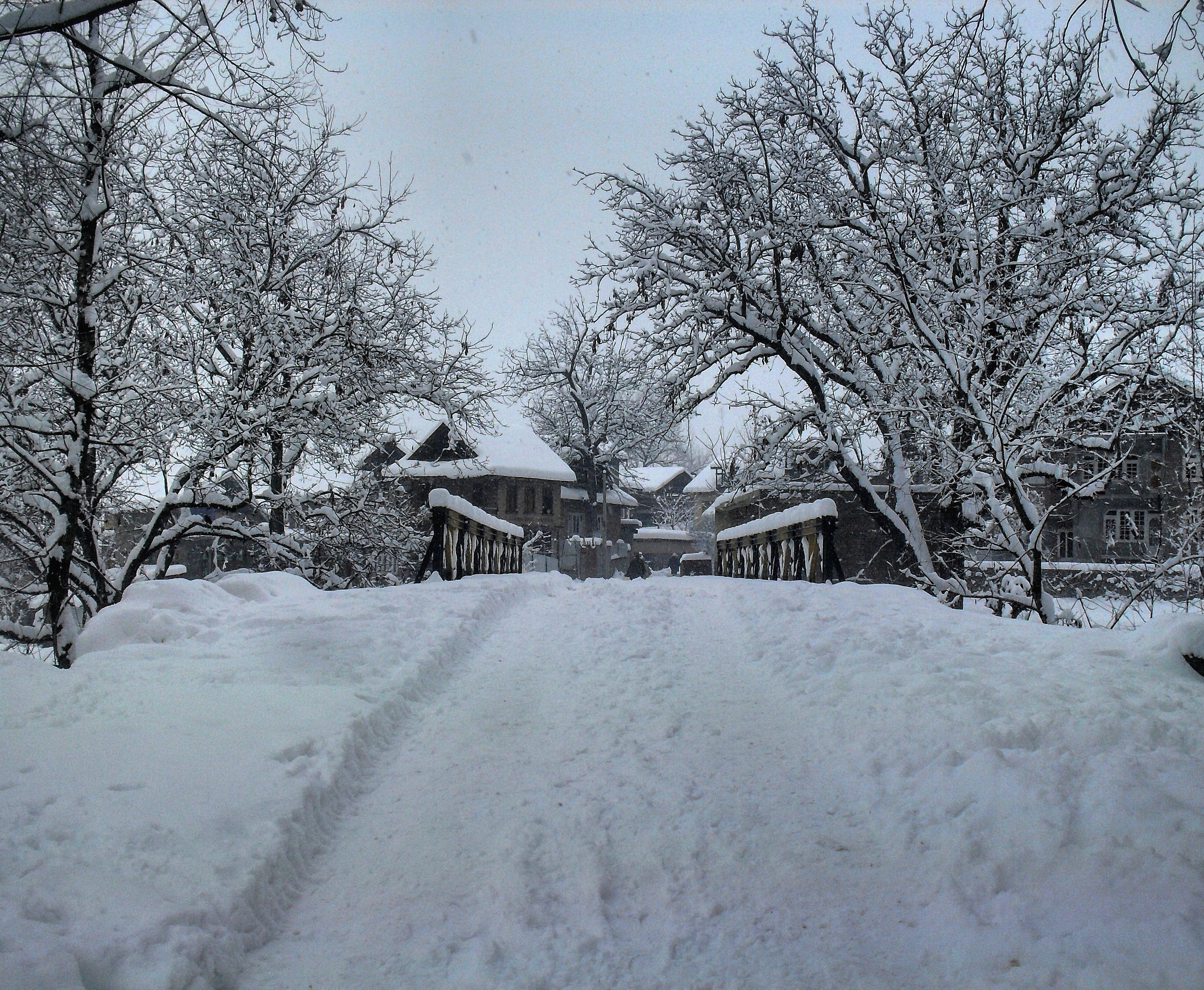
Aragam in Winter

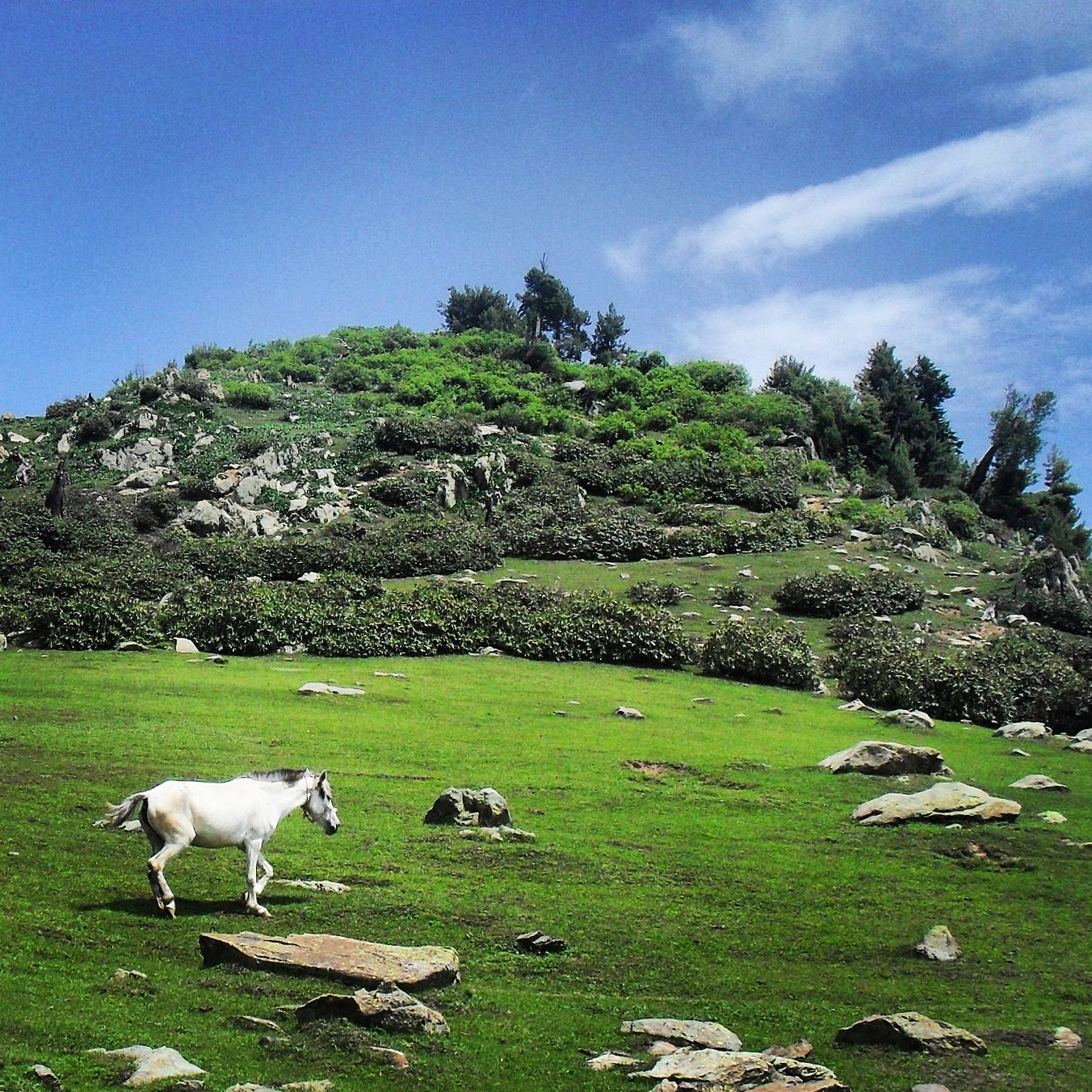
Langmarg meadow in Aragam Bandipore Kashmir

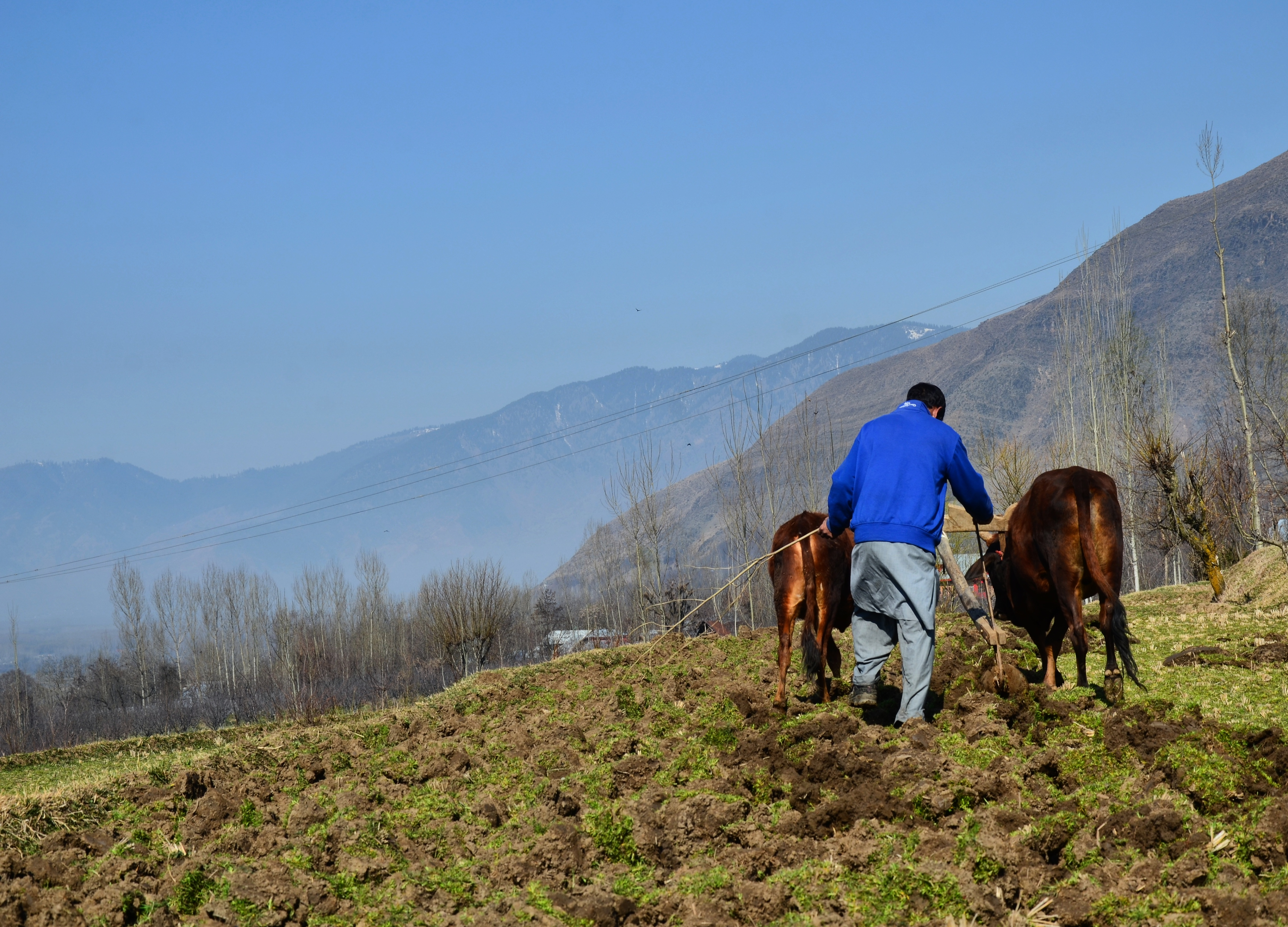
A farmer in Aragam ploughs his land by traditional plough driven by oxen.

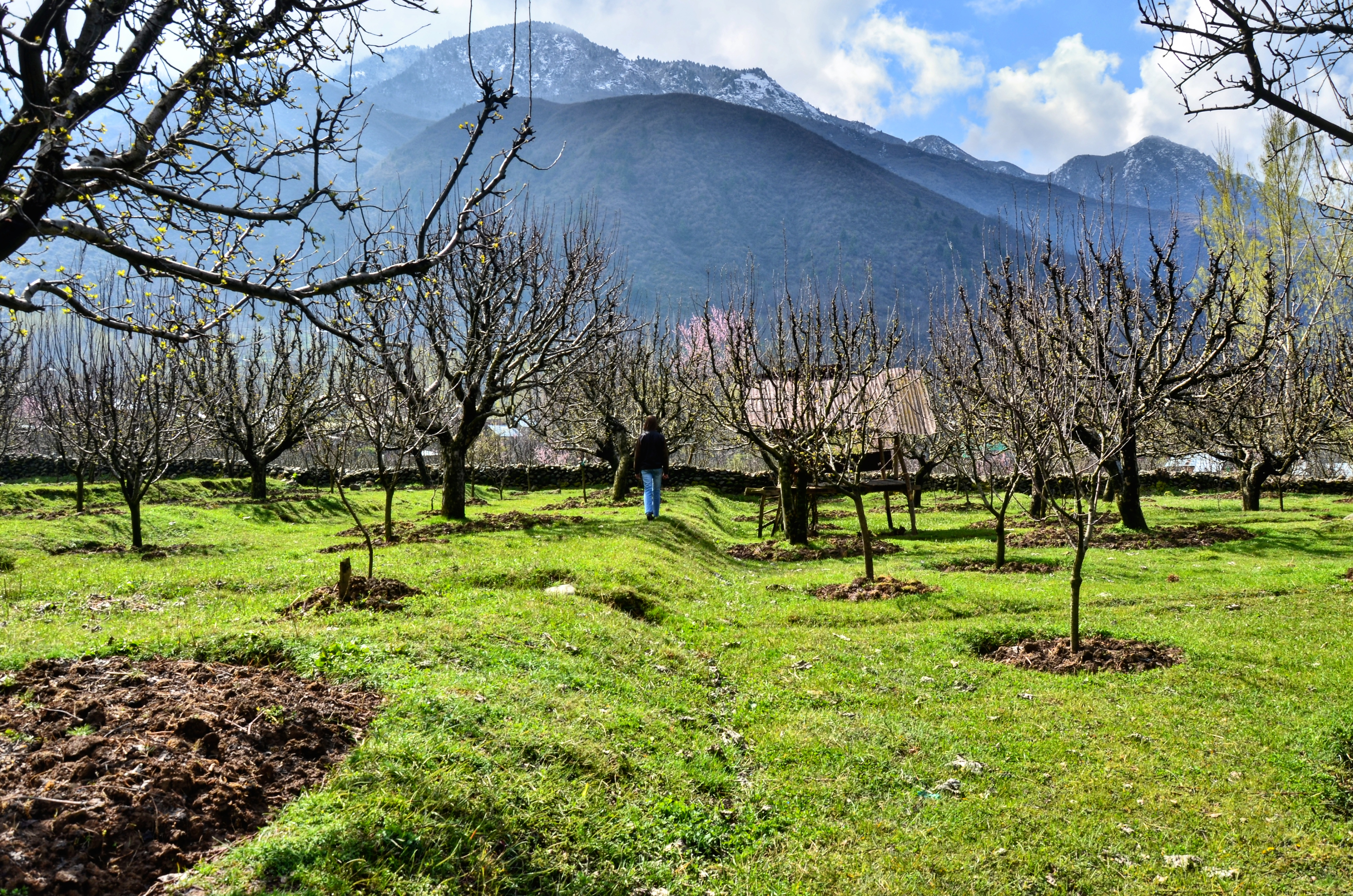
Apple orchard in Aragam Bandipore Kashmir.
