= Aragami =

Aragami may also refer to:

- Aragami (film), a 2003 film
- Aragami (video game), a 2016 video game
  - Aragami 2, a 2021 sequel to the above
- Lala Aragami, Indian poet and saint
