= Indian Armed Forces and the 2014 Jammu and Kashmir floods =

Overview of Indian military response to the 2014 Jammu and Kashmir floods

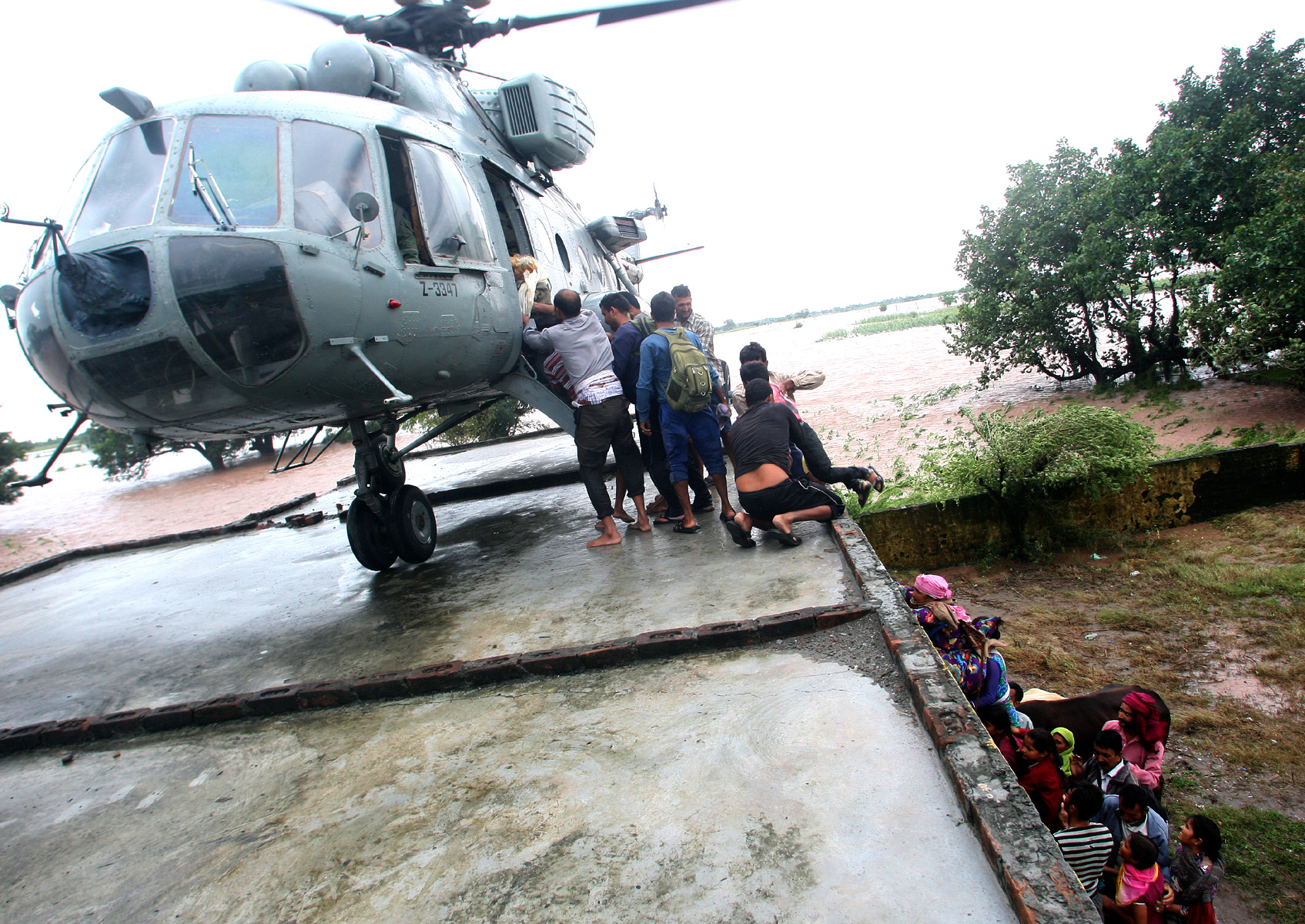
IAF helicopters carrying out rescue, relief and evacuation of people marooned during the flood fury, in Jammu and Kashmir on 6 September 2014.

In the wake of heavy monsoon rain and flash floods in Jammu and Kashmir, the Indian Armed Forces were deployed in increasing numbers starting 2 September 2014 to conduct search, rescue, relief, relocation, humanitarian assistance and rehabilitation missions in Jammu and Kashmir. By 18 September, over 298,514 people were rescued from the various parts of Jammu and Kashmir by the Armed forces. The Jammu and Kashmir floods, the worst in a century according to Omar Abdullah, the Chief Minister of Jammu and Kashmir, paralyzed the state government. Omar Abdullah, responding to public criticism, told the media "I had no government" in the first few days following the floods, as "My secretariat, the police headquarters, the control room, fire services, hospitals, all the infrastructure was underwater." Adding "I had no cell phone and no connectivity. I am now starting to track down ministers and officers." The Jammu and Kashmir floods of 2014 have been blamed on heavy rainfall, about 8 inches (200mm) on 4 September alone, on climate change, unplanned and uncontrolled development, encroachment of river banks, lakes, ponds, and massive loss of wet lands, absence of local government flood forecasting system, and poor governance. The Armed Forces humanitarian assistance mission in response to the floods was named Mission Sahayata (assistances). Northern Command's humanitarian assistance to Civil authorities was named 'Operation Megh Rahat'. The Indian Army, Air Force, and the Navy, committed large resources to the assistance mission including over 30,000 troops ( 21,000 in Srinagar, and 9000 in Jammu), 15 engineer task forces, 84 Indian Air Force and Army Aviation Corps fixed wing transport aircraft and helicopters, naval commandos and rescue specialists, and Base Hospital, four field hospitals, over 106 medical detachments. "Operation Megh Rahat", ended on 19 September 2014, but "Operation Sadbhavna", the relief and medical assistance support, according to government press release, will continue in "close synergy with the civil administration and the police".

== Disaster Management in India ==
The organization, structure, laws, protocol, and arrangements for disaster management at the Federal and State level are outlined in a manual titled Disaster Management in India, and the Disaster Management Act, 2005, which provides for "the effective management of disasters" in India. The Disaster Management Division (DM Division), under the Secretary, Border Management, Ministry of Home Affairs (MHA), Government of India, is responsible for " response, relief and preparedness for natural calamities". The Head of Disaster Management Division is G.V.V. Sarma, Joint Secretary. The head of Border management is Ms Sneh Lata Kumar, Secretary, Border Management.

The National Emergency Operation Centre (NEOC), is responsible for the preparation of the National Disaster Management Plan for the whole country and to ensure that it is "reviewed and updated annually". The Chief of the Integrated Defence Staff of the Chiefs of Staff Committee, is an ex officio member of the NEC. NEOC is mandated to function twenty-four hours a day, seven days a week. The NEOC is responsible for monitoring the disaster or disaster like situation, receive updates from federal Early Warning(EW) Agencies like the India Meteorological Department (IMD), Central Water Commission, Snow & Avalanche Study Establishment. After processing the information NOEC submits its report and updates to affected States and concerned Central Ministries and organizations. During the monsoon period, it is required to issue daily situation reports. It is not known, whether the NEOC was functioning in Jammu and Kashmir prior to the floods, and whether it received the EW from IMD, and reported to the state government. The NEOC is also required to upload its EW reports on its website www.ndmindia.nic.in.

== Early warning (EW) ==
There was no warning of the heavy rain or the floods. The people, the state and the armed forces in the area, were caught unaware by the 2014 floods. None of the Federal or the State Government agencies responsible for monitoring natural disasters and providing early warning, such as [a] Floods -Central Water Commission [b] Landslide hazard – Geological Survey of India (GSI) [c] Avalanche – Defence Research & Development Organization (DRDO) [d] Disaster Management Support (DMS) – Indian Space Research Organization (ISRO), and [e] Weather- India Meteorological Department (IMD), forecast the floods. Knowledgeable observers have singled out the Central Water Commission, which was tardy even during the Uttarakhand floods, in 2013, for criticism. Even as late as 15 September 2014, the web site of the Central Water Commission, Ministry of Water Resources, Government of India, Flood Forecast Bulletins, showed a blank. The Disaster Management Division which is responsible for compiling inputs from all the agencies in a 'Situation report', in its situation report for 2 September 2014, made no mention of the threat of rain or floods in Jammu and Kashmir. As a result, two days later as the water levels rose and the rivers were in spate, and overflowing, there were no National Disaster Response Force assets at hand in Jammu and Kashmir. They started to move days after the floods had hit the state, and only began to arrive in the affected area on 7 and 8 September. The first Situation report of the Disaster Management Division that mentions the floods is dated 7 September. The web site of the DM Division as late as 15 September was a blank. In 2010, Jammu and Kashmir Flood Control Department had forecast major floods which would ravage Srinagar. But the government dismissed the report as alarmist. In September 2014 three days before the Jhelum floods reached Srinagar, "the waters at Sangam near Anantnag had risen so high that the Flood Control Department couldn’t find its gauge". The Government lost three valuable days in reacting. The tardy response by the State and Central Government Disaster management set up has drawn criticism.

== Command and control ==
Northern Command, along with the Advance Air HQ, located in Udhampur, is responsible for the armed forces humanitarian assistance mission, called Operation Megh [ (मेघ) in English Cloud] Rahat, in the entire Jammu and Kashmir. General Officer Commanding in Chief ( GOC-in-C), Northern Command, is Lieutenant General DS Hooda, of 4th Gorkha Rifles. XV Corps also called the Chinar Corps, based in Srinagar, is responsible for the assistance mission in the Kashmir Valley. General Officer Commanding (GOC) XV Corps is Lieutenant General Subrata Saha, of the Assam Regiment. XVI Corps also called White Knight Corps, based in Nagrota, is responsible for assistance mission in areas south of the Pir Panjal range. GOC XVI Corps is Lieutenant General Konsam Himalay Singh of the Rajput Regiment. In Delhi, Air Marshal P.P. Reddy, Chief of Integrated Defence Staff (IDS), who reports to chairman of the Chiefs of Staff Committee, is responsible for coordinating Mission Sahayata, the Armed Forces response to the floods.

== Rescue Mission ==
The Jammu and Kashmir floods, described as a 'tragedy', by Lt Gen DS Hooda, Northern Army Commander, "became evident", on 7 September 14, the third day of incessant rains, when flood waters breached the banks of Jhelum, and submerged Srinagar, including the Badami Bagh Cantonment, disrupted " electricity, water supply and civil communications" and flooded the headquarters of XV Corps, which was responsible for "coordinating all rescue operations". The flooding of headquarters XV Corps, and the Srinagar Cantonment, Hooda acknowledged, delayed the army's rescue operations in Srinagar but "only for a few hours ". The rescue operations however, did not affect rescue work in "South Kashmir", the worst affected area in the first three days, and the Jammu region. In Srinagar, where the "Army does not operate" except in the "Badami Bagh Cantonment and the area of the airfield", the General said the rescue operations were mainly conducted by "Kashmiris" from Srinagar-based Jammu & Kashmir Light Infantry Centre. Responding to media reports that locals were discriminated against, he said that it is hardly likely that soldier of Jammu and Kashmir Light Infantry would discriminate against the Kashmiris in carrying out the rescue mission.

During the first few days the search and rescue operation were hindered by shortage of boats and bad weather. Boats were airlifted from all corners of India, including from far away Tamil Nadu. In the absence of civil boats the army pressed into service its BAUTS, more appropriate for assault river crossings than rescue assistance during floods. By 11 September, there were 224 army boats and 148 NDRF's inflatable boats in the affected area conducting rescue and search operations. For those who were stranded on roof tops as flood water menacingly swirled around them, Air Force helicopters with IAF Garud Commandos help winch the stranded people to safety. Several hundred were rescued from rood tops. In some cases the Indian Air Force(IAF) commandos had to break through the roof to rescue the trapped people.

The Army Commander denied media reports that it had "embedded journalists", and that army has conducted its rescue according to "a hierarchy of importance and influence", rather than "on the first-seen-first-saved basis". On the incidents of stone throwing by some people, he said, "the incidents were very few" and "blown out of proportion. Most people rescued were extremely appreciative of the Army's effort", and that the rescue mission was assisted by "local volunteers who have contributed immensely."

=== Social media in search and rescue ===
The Indian Army, for first time, used social media such as Twitter, WhatsApp, a messaging service, and Facebook, in its search and rescue operations, and to collate and feed Person Finder provided by Google to the army's public information office. According to Indian army's Major General Shokin Chauhan, who is head of public information office, "a dedicated team of two young officers" are handling the social media "practically around the clock". An estimated 12,000 people, according to the Indian army sources, were assisted on the basis of reports received over the social media.

== Relief assistance ==
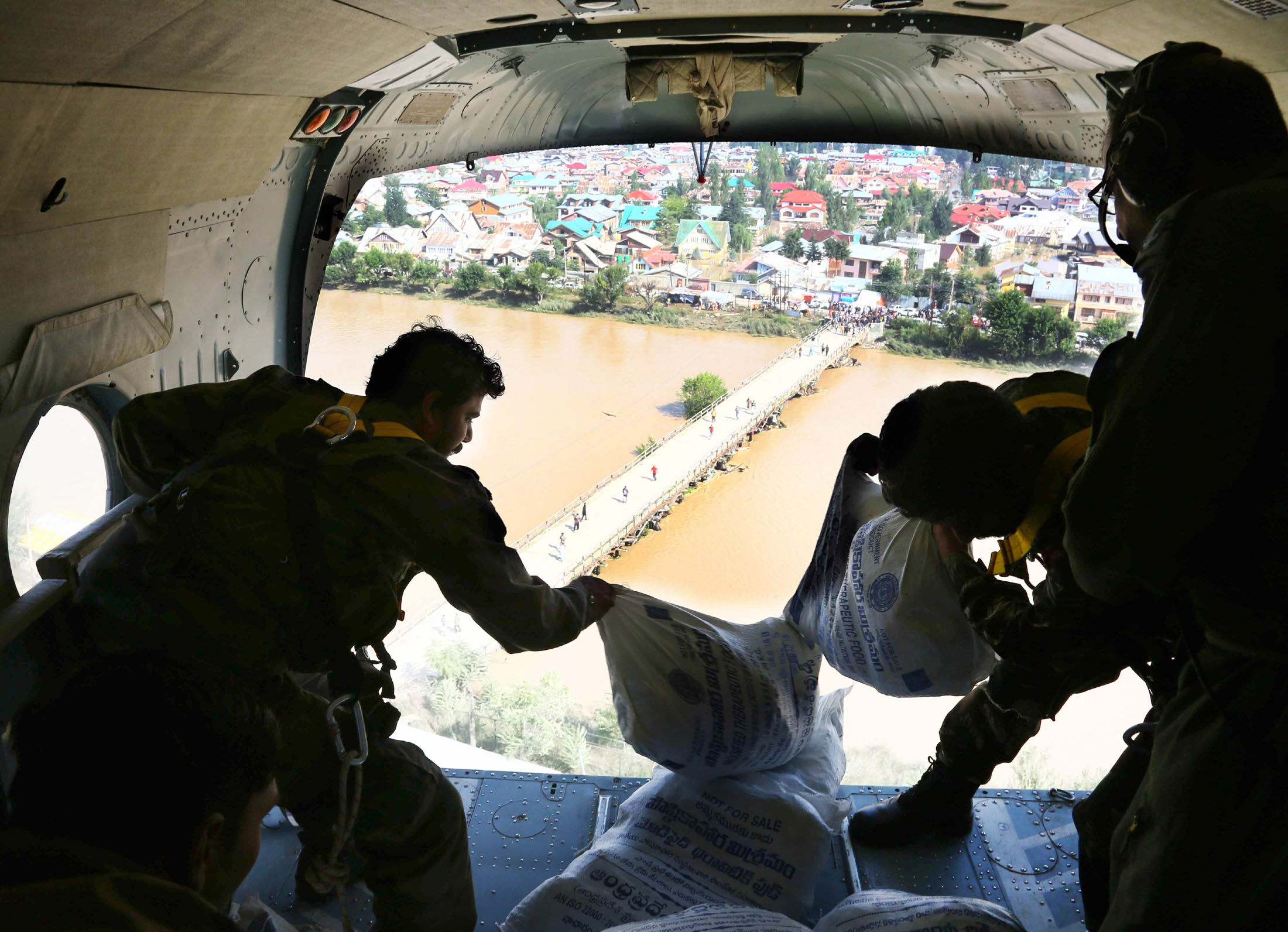
Armed forces personnel dropping the therapeutic food packets in the flood affected areas of Srinagar, on September 10, 2014.jpg

From the start of Mission Sahayata till 16 September, the Armed Forces rescued 2,37,000 persons, and airlifted and distributed 2,24,000 liters of water, 31,500 food packets and ready to eat meals, 375 tonne cooked food, 2.6 tonne of biscuit, 7 tonnes baby food, water purifying tablets, 8,200 blankets, 650 tents, to the affected civilian population.

=== Air transport ===
Because of the massive damage to surface communications, the rescue and relief effort was largely dependent on air transport. Air transport support operations were conducted from air force stations and bases in Delhi, Bhatinda, Chandigarh, Jammu, Srinagar, and Avantipur. Helicopter support operations were conducted from Srinagar, Awantipur, Udhampur, Jammur, Pathankot and Sarsawa. Over 80 aircraft were deployed on the humanitarian assistance mission including 13 Chetak and 5 Advance Light Helicopters of the Army Aviation Corps. On 11 September, the IAF deployed its heavy duty Mil Mi-26, the largest helicopter in the IAF inventory, from IAF 12 Wing, Chandigarh, to Avantipur Air Force base, Srinagar, with 12 tons of relief material, for relief and rescue missions in Jammu and Kashmir. Wing Commander G S Tung of 12 Wing said that the Mi-26 was " especially designed to meet the heavy lift requirements of the IAF and has a carrying capacity of 30 tonnes".

In the first seven days (to 10 September), the army and IAF flew 1081 sorties, 100 to 120 sorties every day, moving 1411 tonnes of relief materials. Air transport operations included delivery of six large water filtration plants with a capacity to filter 1,20,000 bottles per day, engineering stores such as suction and submersible pumps, generator sets with mobile charging stations, communications equipment for the Department of Telecommunications and some of private companies such as Aircel. It airlifted the Base Transmitting Station of BSNL from Kargil to Srinagar. By 18 September 2014, over 80,000 affected people were airlifted including over 28,000 from Srinagar and 52,000 from other flood affected areas of Jammu and Kashmir; by IAF-, Army- and civil aircraft.

=== Navy ===
The Indian Navy Marine Commandos rescued 200 personnel at Haigaon on the Srinagar–Sopore highway, and assisted in rescue efforts near Pantha Chowk, Srinagar. In addition to search and rescue assistance, naval medical team, and Diving Teams were placed on alert, ready to move, at New Delhi, Mumbai and Vishakhapatnam.

=== Medical ===
The armed forces have deployed 80 medical teams. In addition it has set up four field hospitals, one each in Avantipur, Pattan, Anantnag and Old Airfield. Over 20,000 patients have received treatment at these facilities.

=== Repair and restoration of communication infrastructure ===
The floods and rain ravaged the roads and road communication severing road communication between Jammu and Srinagar, and Jammu and Poonch, and host of other roads. Restoration of communication was urgent priority task. Initially five task forces of Border Roads Organization (BRO), which included 5700 personnel, were mobilized. By 10 September, the Jammu–Poonch road was cleared, and road traffic between Batote and Kishtwar and Kishtwar - Sinthan Pass was restored. By 16 September, the strength of Army Engineers and BRO personnel on road building and bridge construction had increased to 100,000. Heavy road construction equipment used included 400 bulldozers, excavators and JCBs, and 300 tippers and dumpers, to restore and repair roads damaged in over 1000 places. After opening of the national highway between Jammu and Srinagar, the army, on 16 September, restored communication between Rajouri and Budhal by constructing a 180 feet bailey bridge over Ans river at Kot Ranka on 16 September.

=== Relief camps ===
To complement the rescue work, the Army established 19 relief camps, where the rescued persons were provided food, shelter, and medical assistance. In Srinagar region, camps were at Badami Bagh Cantonment, Avantipur, Old Airfield, Sumbal, Chattargam and Jijamata Mandir.

== MOD seeks reimbursement for Disaster Relief ==
The Ministry of Defence(MOD) requested and was paid Rs 5 billion as reimbursement for "airdropping of essential supplies and rescue" during Operation Megh Rahat. The Ministry of Home Affairs(MHA) paid the amount from State Disaster Response Fund (SDRF). Criticizing the request for payment by the MOD, Junaid Azim Mattu of National Conference said, "How can they charge people for rescuing them? It is insensitive that we are still suffering from aftermath of the devastation and they are asking for money"

== National Disaster Response Force (NDRF) ==
National Disaster Response Force (NDRF) is a force of 12 battalions, organized on paramilitary lines, and composed of persons on deputation from the para-military forces of India. It is headed by O.P. Singh (IPS-1983), with the title of Director General(DG). He is from the Uttar Pradesh cadre, of the Indian Police Service(IPS). He took over as DG of the NDRF on 1 September 2014, a few days before the floods. OP Singh in addition to being DG NDRF is also DG of the Central Industrial Security Force (Airport sector), his current responsibilities. The NDRF is a top heavy organization, which in addition to the DG has an Inspector General(IG) and several Deputy IGs. Till 2 September the Disaster Management Division, MHA, had no plans to deploy NDRF in Jammu and Kashmir. It was surprised by the floods. A NDRF Officer told the media" We were all caught off guard because there was not a single warning issued by the weather office. The flash floods took us by surprise". NDRF started to arrive in Jammu and Kashmir from 6 September onwards. By 9 September there were elements from 5,6, and 7 NDRF Battalions: 5 NDRF Battalion (1 team of 54 personnel), 6 NDRF Battalion (64 personnel )and 7 NDRF Battalion( 370). The total strength of NDRF committed to Jammu and Kashmir was 488.On 7 September 7 NDRF battalion had 3 teams in Jammu and 6 teams (244 personnel) in Srinagar. The team in Jammu was engaged in responding to a bus stuck under water, and on search and rescue mission in Gharkhal, and Akhnoor, in Jammu District. On 9 September 86 personnel ( 3 teams) from 4 NDRF Battalion( CISF), from Arakkonam, in Tamil Nadu, was airlifted from INS Rajali, to Srinagar, to conduct search-cum-rescue operations in Nehru Park and Manaswal in Srinagar. The 4 NDRF Bn detachment included 24 inflatable boats; with these additions the total of NDRF boats goes up to 148 boats. The NDRF was expected to stay in Jammu and Kashmir for a period of 10 days.

== See also ==
- Flood
- Operation Sadbhavana (Goodwill), Jammu and Kashmir
