= Cheki Ashmuji =

- Village
- Country: India
- Union territory: Jammu and Kashmir
- District: Kulgam

Languages
  - Official: Kashmiri, Urdu, Hindi, Dogri, English
- Time zone: UTC+5:30 (IST)
- PIN: 192231
- Telephone code: 01932
- Vehicle registration: JK 18

Checki Ashmuji is a village in Kulgam District of Jammu and Kashmir in India.

== Notable people ==
- Nazir Ahmad Wani was the first person in Jammu and Kashmir to receive the Ashok Chakra, India's highest peacetime gallantry award
