= Nazir Ahmad Wani =

Indian Army Ashok Chakra recipient (1980-2020)

Lance Naik Nazir Ahmad Wani AC, SM*
- Born: Nazir Ahmad Wani; Cheki Ashmuji, Jammu and Kashmir, India
- Died: 25 November 2018 (aged 38); Srinagar, Jammu and Kashmir, India
- Military career
- Allegiance: India
- Branch: Indian Army
- Service years: 2004–2018
- Rank: Lance Naik
- Service number: 12974389N
- Unit: 162nd Territorial Army battalion (Jammu and Kashmir Light Infantry)
- Conflicts: Insurgency in Jammu and Kashmir †
- Awards: Ashok Chakra (2019); Bar to Sena Medal (2018); Sena Medal (2007)

Lance Naik Nazir Ahmad Wani, AC, SM Bar was an Indian Army soldier and a recipient of the Ashoka Chakra, India's highest peacetime military decoration. At the time of his death, he was serving with an auxiliary battalion of the army's Jammu and Kashmir Light Infantry Regiment, the 162nd Infantry Battalion of the Territorial Army. He was posthumously awarded the Ashoka Chakra for his actions during a counterterrorism operation in which his unit was attached with the 34th Rashtriya Rifles battalion. He was the first recipient of the Ashok Chakra from Jammu and Kashmir.

== Early life ==
Nazir was a resident of Cheki Ashmuji village in the Kulgam district of the Kashmir Valley of Jammu and Kashmir, India into a Kashmiri Muslim family of the Wani clan. In the early 1990s, when Wani was a young boy, he weaved Kashmiri carpets for a monthly salary of few hundred rupees. When the insurgency broke out in the 1990s, it impacted their work and finding work became a struggle.

=== Militancy ===
According to a senior Army officer who spoke to The Times of India, "Wani was a terrorist initially and became a counter-insurgent after he realised the futility of violence". He then surrendered and became a part of the Ikhwan, a pro-government militia group led by Javed Ahmad Shah in late 1994. According to Wani's brother Mushtaq, Wani had joined Ikhwan "out of his free will, and that of God, nothing else". Three militia groups of that time had merged to form the Ikhwan to fight against the militancy. In 2002 the state government of Jammu and Kashmir under Mufti Mohammad Sayeed disbanded the Ikhwan, which led to the loss of livelihood for its members. By then Wani had a wife and two children.

== Military service ==
Nazir joined 162 Infantry Battalion (Territorial Army), a Territorial Army battalion of the Jammu and Kashmir Light Infantry, in 2004. He was awarded Sena Medal in 2007 for gallantry and for a second time in 2018, for killing a terrorist in close combat. He took part in several major counter-insurgency operations in which top militants were either arrested or killed. According to one of his relatives, Wani had killed around thirty militants including some major militants.

At the time of his death, Wani's battalion, 162 Infantry Battalion TA was attached to the 34th battalion, Rashtriya Rifles while conducting counter-insurgency operations.

Throughout his active life, he always willingly faced grave potential threats and was a source of inspiration for others.

— Colonel Rajesh Kalia, officiating Defence spokesman of the Northern Command Headquarters, Indian Army,

=== Operation Batagund ===
On 25 November 2018, a counter-terrorist operation known as Operation Batagund was launched by 34 Rashtriya Rifles at Hirpora village near Batagund, Shopian district. After intelligence relating to the presence of senior Lashkar-e-Taiba militants in the area was received, a cordon and search operation was initiated at midnight by a joint team of security forces consisting of the Jammu and Kashmir Police, army units and Central Reserve Police Force in the area. The militants then fired upon the forces after which the forces retaliated.

At 12:25 am, according to an army officer, one of the soldiers was hit. The soldier fell near the garage of a house. Under covering fire provided by his fellow soldiers hiding behind walnut trees, Wani attempted to pull the injured soldier to safety. In the meantime, the militants kept firing at them and changing their positions. Despite being under fire, Wani pulled out the wounded soldier.

During the gunfight, Wani entered the house and killed the district commander of Lashkar-e-Taiba and another militant. Wani received multiple wounds on his body and head, but despite his injuries, Wani shot and injured a third. The other soldiers had entered the building by then and killed the remaining. First aid was immediately provided for his injuries and he was taken to hospital where he died due to his wounds.

According to the Jammu and Kashmir Police, the six militants killed in the operation belonged to Hizbul Mujahideen and Lashkar-e-Taiba and were identified as:

- Mushtaq Ahmad Mir, alias Hammad, district commander of Lashkar-e-Toiba for Shopian district
- Mohammad Abass Bhatt of Cheki Mantribugh Shopian
- Umar Majeed Ganai, alias Maaz, alias Abu Hanzalla, of South Kulgam
- Mohammad Waseem Wagay, alias Saifullah, of Amshipora, district commander of Hizbul Mujahideen for Shopian district
- Khalid Farooq Malik, alias Rafi, of Aliyalpora, Shopian, the district commander of Hizbul Mujahideen for Kulgam district
- One from Pakistan.

The bodies of all six were retrieved. A large number of weapons and ammunition were recovered. Police stated that Abbas Bhat who was killed, was wanted in connection with the murder of Lt. Ummer Fayaz, who was abducted and murdered in May 2017.

== Funeral ==
On 26 November, Wani's body was taken to his family at Chak Ashmuji, wrapped in the Indian flag. During the funeral ceremony attended by 500–600 people, Wani was accorded a 21-gun salute while his body was lowered into his grave.

== Ashoka Chakra ==
On 26 January 2019 on Republic Day, President Ram Nath Kovind posthumously awarded the Ashoka Chakra to Nazir Ahmad Wani. The award was accepted by his wife Mahajabeen at an official ceremony during the Delhi Republic Day parade. He was the first recipient of the Ashok Chakra award from the Kashmir region of the Indian state of Jammu and Kashmir.

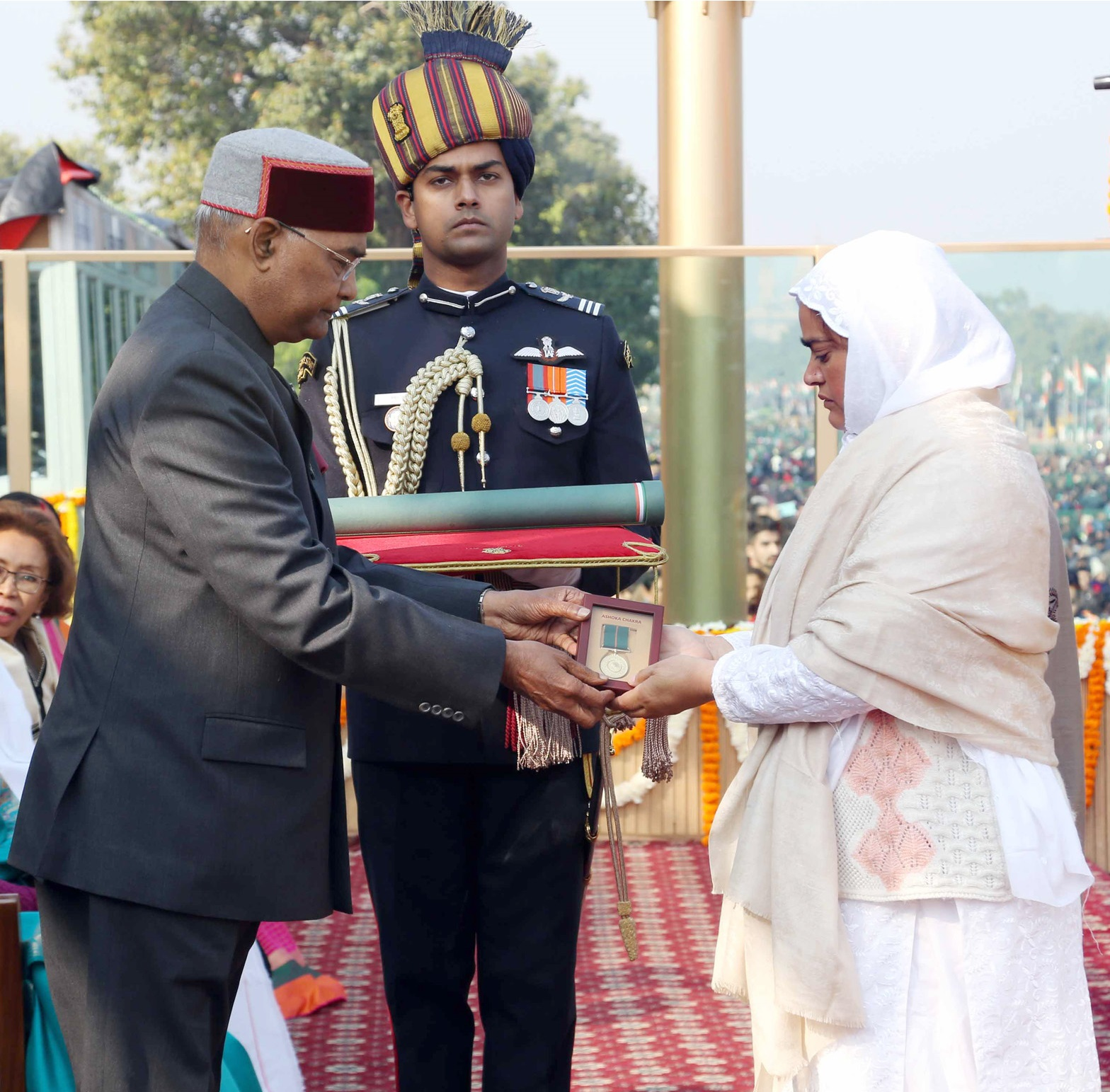
Nazir Ahmad Wani's widow (right) receives the Ashoka Chakra from president Ram Nath Kovind on 26 January 2019.

The Ashoka Chakra citation reads as follows:

CITATION

LANCE NAIK NAZIR AHMAD WANI, BAR TO SENA MEDAL

THE JAMMU AND KASHMIR LIGHT INFANTRY/34TH BATTALION THE RASHTRIYA RIFLES

Since his enrolment in the Army, Lance Naik Nazir Ahmad Wani, SM, epitomised qualities of a fine soldier. He always volunteered for challenging missions, displaying great courage under adverse conditions, exposing himself to grave danger on numerous occasions in the line of duty. This is evident from the two gallantry awards conferred on him earlier.

Lance Naik Nazir, yet again insisted on being part of the assault team during Operation Batagund launched by 34 Rashtriya Rifles Battalion on 25 Nov 2018 post receipt of credible intelligence regarding presence of six heavily armed terrorists in Shopian district of Jammu and Kashmir. Tasked to block the most likely escape route, Lance Naik Nazir, moved swiftly with his team to the target house and tactically positioned himself within striking distance. Sensing danger, the terrorists attempted breaching the inner cordon firing indiscriminately and lobbing grenades. Undeterred by the situation, the NCO held ground and eliminated one terrorist in a fierce exchange at close range. The terrorist was later identified as a dreaded district commander of Lashker-e-Taiba.

Thereafter, displaying exemplary soldierly skills, Lance Naik Nazir closed in with the target house under heavy fire and lobbed grenades into a room where another terrorist was hiding. Seeing the foreign terrorist escaping from the window, the NCO encountered him in a hand to hand combat situation. Despite being severely wounded, Lance Naik Nazir eliminated the terrorist. Showing utter disregard to his injury, Lance Naik Nazir continued to engage the remaining terrorists with same ferocity and audacity. He injured yet another terrorist at close range, but was hit again and succumbed to his injuries.

For displaying unparalleled bravery and supreme sacrifice in the line of duty, Lance Naik Nazir Ahmad Wani, SM is awarded “ASHOK CHAKRA (POSTHUMOUS)”.

== Personal life ==
Nazir is survived by his wife Mahajabeen who worked as a teacher and two sons, Athar and Shaid. The Hindu reported that "Wani comes from a humble background and had worked for the benefit of the underprivileged section in his village and surrounding area."

He always encouraged all of us to make people around us happy, to resolve people’s problems…. He always wanted to make his battalion proud. For him, duty was supreme. He was a source of inspiration for people in our area and community.

— Mahajabeen, Wani's wife,
