= Kashmiri rug =

A Kashmir rug is a hand-knotted oriental rug from Kashmir Valley in the Indian administered portion of the disputed Kashmir region, which is associated with Kashmiri handicrafts. Kashmir rugs or carpets have intricate designs that are primarily oriental, floral style in a range of colors, sizes and quality.

== Name ==
The Kashmiri( /kaʃˈmɪəri/ ) word denotes a native or inhabitant of Kashmir. It also refers to the language of Kashmir. Rug ( /rʌɡ/ ) word is recognised with the floor covering of thick woven material ("an oriental rug").

== Manufacturing ==
Kashmir carpets are handmade, hand-knotted, and are primarily made using pure wool, pure silk and occasionally wool and silk blends. These are available in wide-ranging colors, designs and sizes.

Kashmir rugs are primarily made in the vicinity of Srinagar, Kashmir and neighboring villages in rural parts of Kashmir. Kashmir rugs are one of the most sought-after artworks by connoisseurs around the world owing to their exceptional workmanship.

Kashmir rugs are available in a range of standard sizes, such as 3'x2', 4'x2'6", 5'x3', 6'x4', 7'x5', 10'x8', 12'x9', 14'x10', 15'x12' and 18'x12'. Larger sizes than these dimensions are mostly custom-made.

== Designs ==
Kashmir rugs are renowned to have bright, jewel-like color tones such as sapphire blue, ruby red, emerald green, aquamarine, amethyst, and ivory. Rugs from Kashmir are traditionally made in oriental, floral designs that typically involve significant and culturally important motifs such as the paisley, chinar tree, (the oriental plane) and tree-of-life. Most of these designs are rooted in the Kashmiri way of life and are a symbolic representation of the age-old Kashmir tradition of hospitality, warmth, and love.

It is often said in Kashmir that a home is incomplete without a soul - a Kashmir carpet. The ethos of Kashmir culture is often represented in the motifs of a Kashmir rug.

Rugs of Kashmir have always found more appeal due to their quaint designs and an interesting blend of classic colors inspired by the cultural microcosm of Kashmir and at times the colors were contemporary in nature that made carpets of Kashmir widely popular across North America, South Asia and Europe.
