= Batagund =

Village in the Indian union territory of Jammu and Kashmir

Coordinates: 34°08′56.72″N 76°49′33.47″E

Batagund Bijbehara is a village in the Anantnag district, in the southern Kashmir Valley of the Indian union territory of Jammu and Kashmir. Its post office is at Bijbehara and the nearest medical center is at Veeri. As of 2012, its population was approximately 181 (90 female and 91 male). There is a high school located in this village. It is an ancient village and as according the village contains fabulous past of Hindus. There is also a temple located at the bank of a river "Tarbal". This is a short populated village with mere a total number of 3 dozen households. The neighbouring villages are Laribal, Joibal, Veeri and Gadiseer.

== Geography ==
Batagund village is 10 km (6.2 mi) away from the north of the district headquarters, Anantnag and 3 km (1.9 mi) to the south of Bijbehara and is about 51 km (32 mi) away from Srinagar. It is 850 km (530 mi) away from the national capital, New Delhi and about 250 km (160 mi) from Jammu. It is approximately 5,000 meters above sea level.
