= Langmarg =

Coordinates: 34.3408°N 74.7355°E

Langmarg is a meadow in Aragam Village of Jammu and Kashmir at an altitude of 3299 meters (10,823 feet) and is nearby to Gailbal Forest, Daitwās and Pīrpal. The Langmarg meadow is famous among backpackers as the meadow basically acts as a base camp for further treks to Larmarg, Moonmarg and other meadows. The Langmarg meadow usually remains abuzz with Shepherds and Gujjars as the meadow is also used as a grazing ground and the Sheep Husbandry Department, also shows its presence by setting up camps during summers. With the onset of winter, the meadow is emptied as it snows heavily there making it almost impossible for human life to thrive.

- Type: Mountain
- Location: Jammu and Kashmir, Himalayan North, South Asia, Asia
- Latitude: 34° 20' 26.8" (34.3408°) north
- Longitude: 74° 44' 7.9" (74.7355°) east
