= Ummer Fayaz =

Indian Army officer (1994–2017)

Lieutenant Ummer Fayaz
- Portrait of Fayaz
- Born: Ummer Fayaz Parray; 8 June 1994; Kulgam district, Jammu and Kashmir, India
- Died: 9 May 2017 (aged 22); Shopian district, Jammu and Kashmir, India
- Education: Jawahar Navodaya Vidyalaya, Anantnag; National Defence Academy; Indian Military Academy
- Military career
- Allegiance: India
- Branch: Indian Army
- Service years: 2016–2017
- Rank: Lieutenant
- Unit: 2 Rajputana Rifles

Lieutenant Ummer Fayaz (8 June 1994 – 10 May 2017) was an Indian Army officer who was abducted and killed in May 2017 by Lashkar-e-Taiba and Hizbul Mujahideen militants in Jammu and Kashmir, India. He had been commissioned as a lieutenant in the Indian Army from the Indian Military Academy, Dehradun on 10 December 2016, and was serving in the 2nd battalion, Rajputana Rifles.

== Early life ==
Ummer Fayaz was born in Kulgam, Jammu & Kashmir, India in 1994, and studied at Jawahar Navodaya Vidyalaya, Anantnag and the National Defence Academy. He faced several difficulties while in training as people in his home were not supportive of his decision to join the Indian Army. However, Fayaz was determined to join, as he used to say "I will change my Kashmir, I will make it heaven on earth again".He was an alumnus of Delta Squadron, NDA.

== Abduction and killing ==
At the time of Fayaz's abduction he was on leave from duty and was also unarmed. He had come to his uncle's house in Shopian district, Jammu and Kashmir to attend a marriage ceremony in his family. On the night of 9 May 2017 he was abducted from his uncle's house. Militants shot him twice, and his dead body was found the next morning.

== Aftermath ==
He is survived by his father, who is a farmer, his mother and two sisters. He was given a guard of honour and the funeral was attended by 400 people. His murder was extensively criticized on social media. A candle march in his memory was also organised at India Gate, Delhi on an evening in May 2017, which attracted enormous support and publicity.

All the militants who were responsible for his murder were killed in operations on 31 March and 1 April 2018 by Rashtriya Rifles units. Jammu & Kashmir Police stated that militant Abbas Bhat, who was wanted in connection with Fayaz's abduction and murder, was among the militants killed in Operation Batagund on 25 November 2018.

== Legacy ==
In 2017, Lt Ummer Fayaz was the 847th name to be engraved on the War Memorial at the Indian Military Academy. In May of the same year, the Army Goodwill School, an army school in Jammu and Kashmir, was renamed to Shaheed Lt. Ummer Fayaz Goodwill School by the Indian Army to honour Fayaz.

A book named, Undaunted: Lt. Ummer Fayaz of Kashmir by Bhaavna Arora is based on the life of Ummer Fayaz.

== See also ==
- Insurgency in Jammu and Kashmir
- Jawahar Navodaya Vidyalaya, Anantnag
