= Lala Aragami =

Saint, poet, and teacher

- Born: 11 March 1923
- Died: 27 August 1988 (aged 65)
- Resting place: Chithi Bandi
- Occupation: Sufi Poet
- Writing career
- Period: 1923–1988
- Subject: Sufi poetry
- Notable work: Kuliyati Lala Aragami

Lala Malik (11 March 1923 – 27 August 1988), known under his pen name Lala Aragami, was a kashmiri poet, Sufi mystic and spiritual teacher in Kashmir.

== Life ==
He was born on 11 March 1923 in village Chithibandi in Bandipore district in a poor family. His father was Dawood Malik and mother was called Doulat Deddi. Malik received only primary education. At age of 17, he learnt about Sufism from Shaban Solur. After his death, he was guided in Sufism by Ama Kawa, a Sufi from Charari Sharief.

Malik married a woman named Gasha from the same village. They had one daughter and three sons. He worked as a labourer, milkman and imam.

Lala Aragami was born into a family known for its simplicity, honesty, and truthfulness. His father, Dawood Malik, and mother, Dulat Ded, were respected members of their village. From a young age, he displayed remarkable intelligence and spiritual inclination. Although he received formal education up to the 8th standard, his parents ensured he gained deep knowledge of the Quran, Fiqh, and Hadith.

== Family and livelihood ==
Lala Aragami was married to Gasha Bibi, a virtuous and noble woman of the village. They had one daughter and three sons. To support his family, he worked as a milkman, a laborer, and finally as an Imam of a mosque. Despite his humble means, he remained dedicated to his spiritual pursuits.

== Spiritual journey and mentorship ==
At the age of 17, Lala Aragami embarked on a spiritual journey under the guidance of Hazrat Shaban Saeb Slura. After the passing of his first mentor, he was deeply affected but later dreamt that Hazrat Shaban Saeb handed him over to Hazrat Ama Saeb Kawa of Chrar-e-Sharief. Hazrat Ama Saeb Kawa was a highly esteemed mystic, known for his rigorous tests, and had no disciples except for Lala Aragami. Under his mentorship, Lala Aragami mastered the knowledge of Shariah, Tareeqat, Haqeeqat, and Maarifat.

== Affiliation with Sufi orders ==
Lala Aragami followed both the Qadriya and Chishti Silsilas of Sufism. He spent days and nights in deep meditation and prayer, renouncing worldly comforts to lead a life of simplicity and devotion.

== Disciples and spiritual influence ==
Lala Aragami had numerous disciples across Kashmir, some of whom became prominent Sufi poets and spiritual guides. His well-known disciples include:

- Kamal Sahib Konen (Bandipora)
- Mahad Sahib Pushwari
- Khazir Sahib Kandi (Kupwara)
- Ghulam Mouhiddin Saeb Drugmulla (Kupwara)
- Ghulam Mohammad Zarger Josh
- Ghulam Hassan Mir (Rednag, Lolab)
- Jalla Sahib (Bagroo, Batmaloo)

One of his disciples, Ghulam Mouhiddin Saeb Drugmulla (popularly known as Kael Bab Saeb), attributed a miraculous healing to Lala Aragami. As a child, he suffered from multiple disorders, but upon being taken to Lala Aragamiâ’s blessed presence, he reportedly began to walk and communicate normally.

Message of Love, Unity, and Brotherhood

Lala Aragami’s teachings transcended barriers of race and class. He emphasized love, unity, brotherhood, and simple living. His spiritual philosophy encouraged devotion to God, kindness to humanity, and a universal message of harmony.

== Poetry and literary contributions ==
Lala Aragami was a prolific Sufi poet who composed thousands of mystical verses in Kashmiri. His poetry, deeply spiritual and philosophical, explored themes of divine beauty, truth, love, and the mysticâ€™s quest for the ultimate reality. His works also included praise for prophets, Sufi saints, harmony, and unity.

== Influence on Kashmiri Sufi poetry ==
Lala Aragami introduced a unique style in Kashmiri Sufi poetry and elevated it to great heights. He employed a rich blend of Kashmiri idioms, along with words from Persian, Arabic, and Sanskrit. His poetry is still sung in Sufi mehfils, inspiring generations of Sufi singers and poets.

=== A notable Kashmiri couplet ===
One of his well-known couplets addresses a Kashmiri Pandit girl, urging her to have unrestrained devotion to her deity:

Bata Koori Vate Kanie Manj Chuai Dai, Karee Pooja, Yinai Mushravak Lai.

== Miracles and spiritual legacy ==
Several miracles are attributed to Lala Aragami, many of which are still recounted by his followers. His disciples believed that he possessed divine blessings, which healed the sick and guided many towards the path of spirituality.

== Death and Shrine ==
Lala Aragami died at the age of 63 on 27 August 1988 and was buried in his ancestral graveyard at Chattibanday Argame, Bandipora. A beautiful shrine was later built at his resting place, which continues to be a revered site.

=== Annual commemorations and Sufi gatherings ===
Three special days are celebrated at his shrine every year:

- 11 March
- 7 March
- 27 August

On these occasions, Sufi poets and singers gather to recite his poetry in spiritual mehfils. The shrine committee, headed by Habibullah Malik, the eldest son of Lala Aragami, organizes events and provides meals to the visiting devotees. The shrine is visited by people of all faiths, reflecting the universal appeal of his teachings.

== Philosophy and impact ==
Lala Aragami was an epitome of simple living, selflessness, and devotion. He never took money from his disciples and always looked after the needy. His poetry and teachings continue to inspire spiritual seekers, making him one of the greatest Sufi poets of Kashmir.
