= Tabrizi =

Tabrizi (Persian: تبریزی) is a surname originating in Tabriz, Iran. Notable people with the surname include:

- Ali Tabrizi, a 14th/15th century Iranian woodcarver
- Badr al-Din Tabrizi, a 13th-century Iranian architect and scholar
- Behrooz Ghamari-Tabrizi (born 1960), Iranian-born American scholar, professor of historian and sociologist of Iran
- Homam-e Tabrizi (or Homamiddin ibni Ala-e Tabrizi), an Iranian poet
- Jawad Tabrizi (1926–2006), a 20th-century Iranian Shia marja'
- Kamal Tabrizi, an Iranian film director
- Maqsud-Ali Tabrizi, a 17th-century Iranian physician
- Mir Ali Tabrizi, a 14th-century Iranian calligraphist, to whom the invention of Nasta'liq calligraphy style is attributed
- Mirza Abdul'Rahim Talibov Tabrizi, a 19th-20th century Iranian intellectual and social reformer
- Muhammad ibn Muhammad Tabrizi, a 13th-century Persian Muslim commentator on Maimonides
- Rami Tabrizi, a 14th-century Persian poet
- Qatran Tabrizi, a 9th-century Iranian poet
- Sadegh Tabrizi (1938–2017), Iranian modern painter, calligrapher
- Saib Tabrizi, a 17th-century Iranian poet
- Sarah Tabrizi, a British neuroscientist
- Shams Tabrizi, an 11th-century Iranian Sufi mystic

== See also ==
- List of people from Tabriz
