= List of people from Tabriz =

Here is a complete list for notable people who lived or from Tabriz:

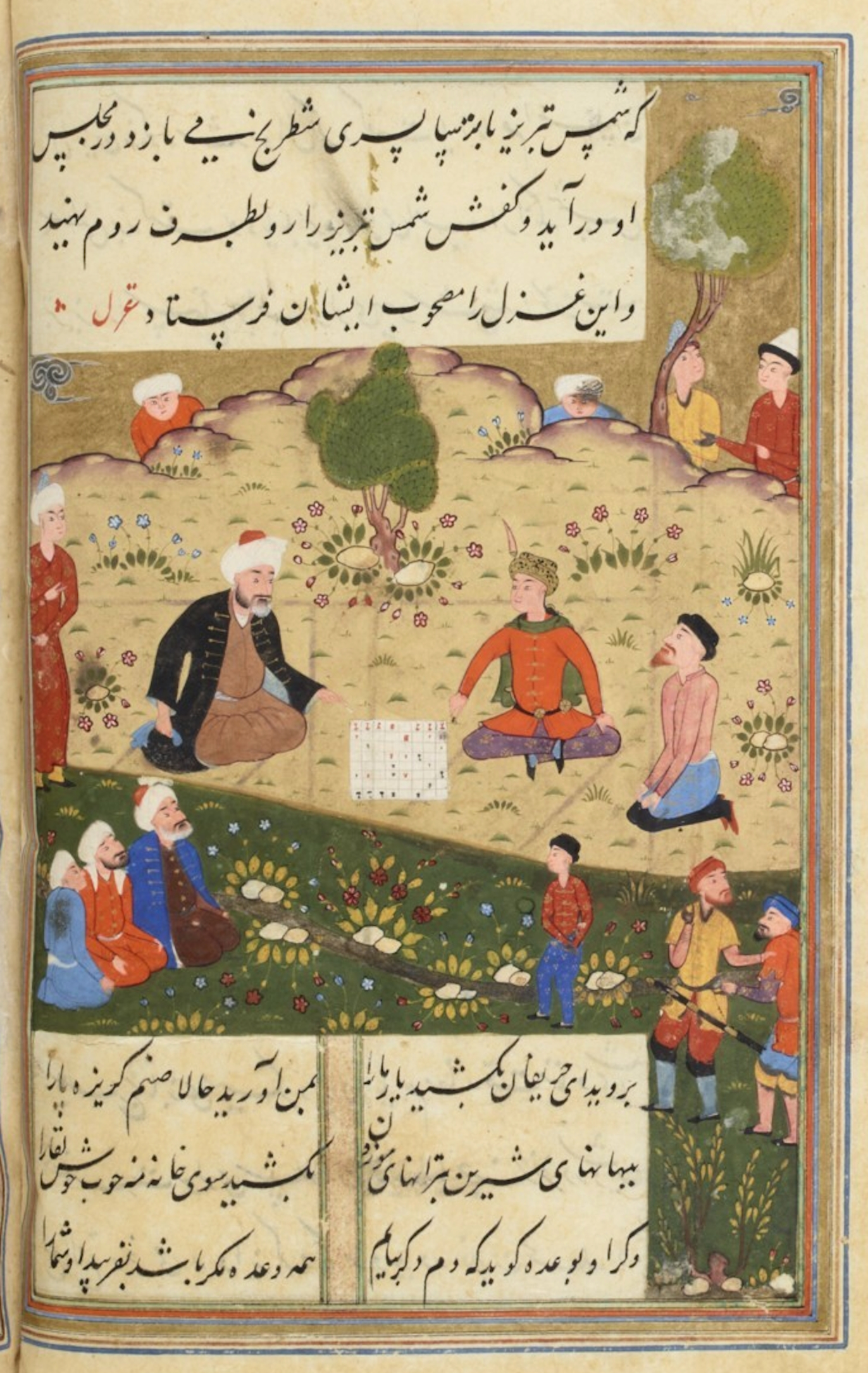
Shams Tabrizi

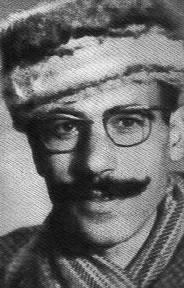
Samad Behrangi

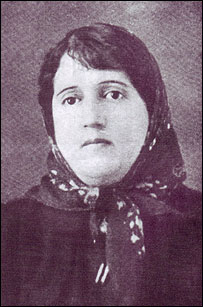
Parvin E'tesami

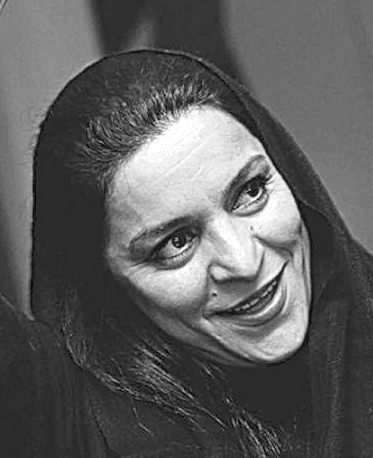
Tahmineh Milani

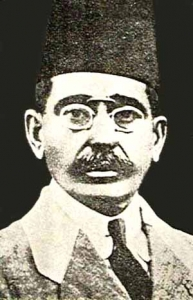
Iraj Mirza

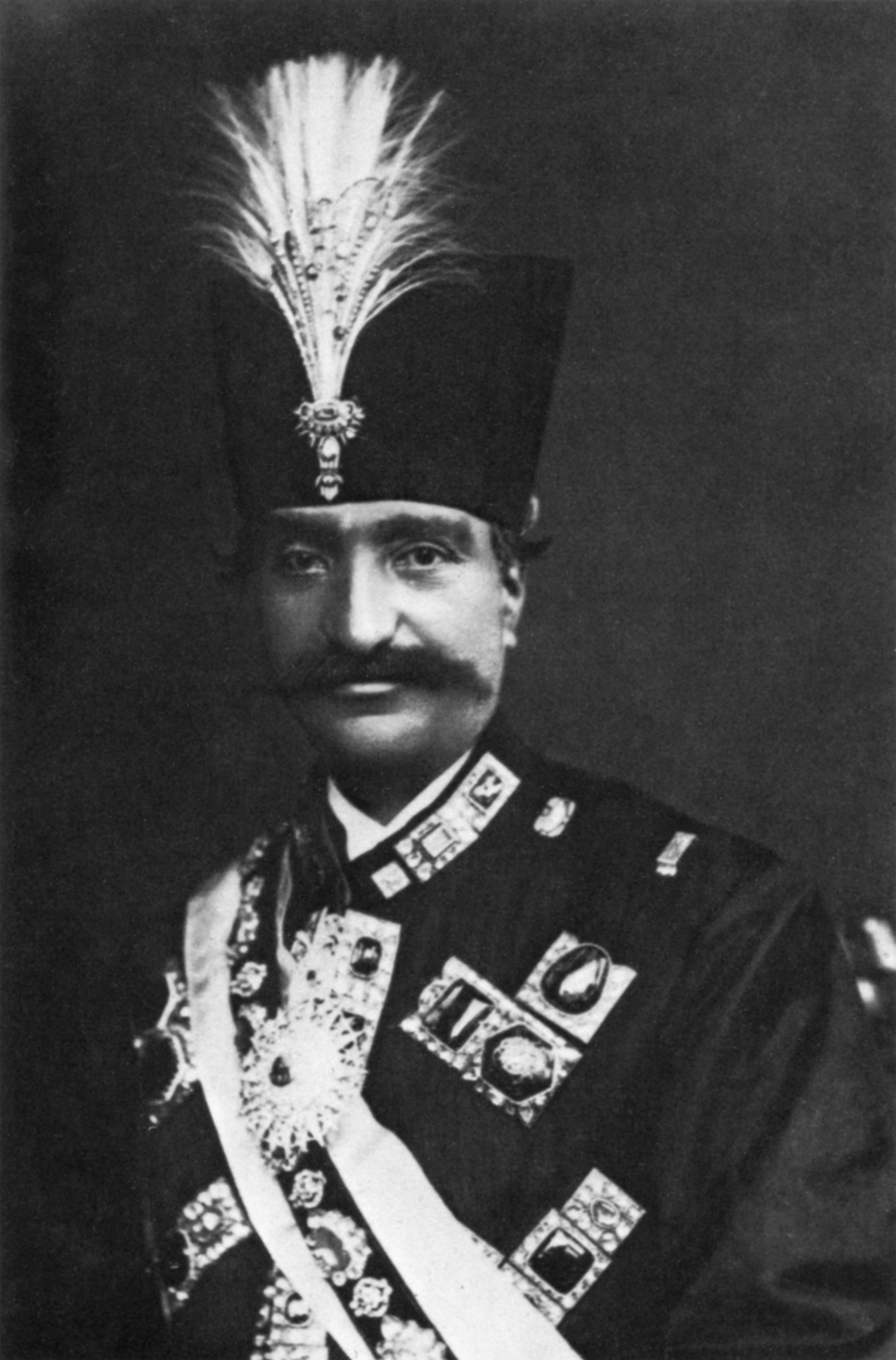
Naser al-Din Shah Qajar

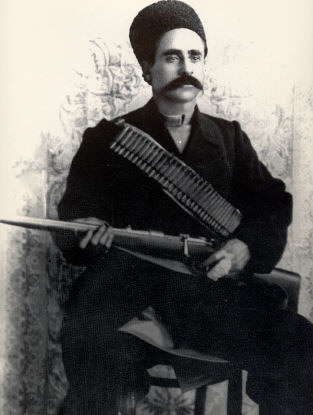
Sattar Khan

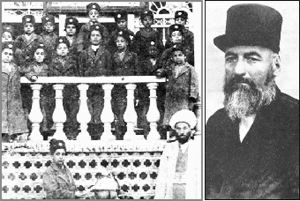
Hassan Roshdieh

A

- Abu'l Majd Tabrizi, compiler of Safina-yi Tabriz, writer
- Alexander Abian, was an Iranian-born Armenian-American mathematician who taught for over 25 years at Iowa State University and became notable for his frequent posts to various Usenet newsgroups, and his advocacy for the destruction of the Moon.
- Sarkis Acopian, was an Armenian-American inventor, industrialist, environmentalist, and humanitarian.
- Ahmad Hussein Adl, Minister of Agriculture
- Akbar Alami, Representative of Parliament
- Massoud Amin, American engineer
- Taghi Arani, Iranian political activist; killed in prison in the First Pahlavi era
- Armik
- Aziz Asli, soccer player
- Cristoforo Armeno, translator
- Emik Avakian, was an Armenian American inventor and owner of numerous patents including breath-operated computer, a mechanism that facilitates putting wheelchairs on automobiles, and a self operating robotic wheel that converts manual wheel chairs into automatic.

B

- Bagher Khan, Nationalist revolutionist
- Karim Bagheri, soccer player
- Reza Baraheni, novelist, poet, critic and political activist, former president of Pen Canada
- Mohammad Hossein Behjat Tabrizi (Shahriar), poet
- Samad Behrangi, children's books writer
- Qolam Hossein Bigjeh-Khani, musician and tar player
- Gayk Bzhishkyan

C

D

- Reza Deghati, Iranian-French photographer
- Cyrus Dinmohammadi, soccer player

E

- Hasan Enami Olya
- Parvin E'tesami, poet

F

- Javad Fakori, Major General; commander of the IRIAF during the Iran–Iraq War; served as Defense Minister
- Farhad Fakhredini, conductor of National Orchestra

G

- Ivan Galamian
- Azim Gheychisaz
- Vartan Gregorian, Iranian-American President of Carnegie Corporation

H

- Ebrahim Hakimi, Prime Minister of Iran
- Sattar Hamedani, soccer player
- Hamid Mirza, heir presumptive of the Qajar dynasty
- Mohsen Hashtroodi, mathematician
- Homam-e Tabrizi, poet
- Ahad Hoseini, painter

I

- Iraj Mirza, poet and famous politician

J

- Allameh Jafari, cleric, researcher
- Feridoun Jam, Head of Iranian Army corps
- Jafar Tabrizi, calligrapher
- Mahmud Jam, Prime Minister of Iran
- Rosa Jamali, poet, writer

K

- Anna Kaplan (née Monahemi), Iranian-born American, member of the New York State Senate
- Hakob Karapents, was a prolific Iranian-Armenian author
- Ahmad Kasravi, politician and author
- Samuel Khachikian, film director
- Rasoul Khatibi, soccer player
- Mohammad Khiabani, cleric; a political leader during Iran's Constitutionalist Revolution

L

M

- Yadollah Maftun Amini, poet
- Abu'l Majd Tabrizi, compiler of Safina-yi Tabriz; writer
- Naser Manzuri, novelist, linguist
- Tahmineh Milani, film director
- Mir-Hossein Mousavi, Prime Minister of Iran, reformist

N

- Reza Naji, actor
- Nasimi, poet (however, there is a controversy about his birthplace)

P

- Farah Pahlavi (Farah Diba), the last queen consort of Iran
- Jafar Panahi, film director

Q

- Abbas Mirza Qajar, prince, reformist
- Ahmad Shah Qajar, King of Iran
- Mohammad Ali Shah Qajar, King of Iran
- Mohammad Shah Qajar, Shah of Persia of the Qajar dynasty
- Naser al-Din Shah Qajar, King of Iran
- Qatran Tabrizi, poet

R

- Mirza Taqikhan Raf'at Tabrizi, poet, writer, founder of Raf'at Literary School
- Hassan Roshdieh, founder of the first modern school in Iran

S

- Kazem Sadegh-Zadeh, German philosopher of medicine
- Gholamhossein Saedi, writer, novelist and political activist
- Samad Samadianpour, Chief of Police of Iran
- Sattar Khan, Nationalist revolutionary leader
- Seqat-ol-Eslam Tabrizi, Nationalist cleric
- Shams Tabrizi, Sufi
- Mohammad Kazem Shariatmadari, Grand Ayatollah
- Jamileh Sheykhi, actress
- Ali Soheili, Prime Minister of Iran

T

- Allameh Tabatabaei, cleric, researcher
- Javad Tabatabai, political philosopher, historian, university professor
- Abdurrazzaq Nasha Tabrizi, poet
- Maqsud Ali Tabrizi
- Mir Ali Tabrizi, calligraphist
- Mirza Abdul'Rahim Talibov Tabrizi, intellectual and social reformer
- Muhammad ibn Muhammad Tabrizi, Muslim convert from Judaism; philosopher and translator
- Hasan Taqizadeh, politician, diplomat and scholar
- Varto Terian, Iran's first stage actress.

V

- Fariba Vafi, novelist
- Monir Vakili Nikjoo, opera singer
