= Or Adonai =

Work by Rabbi Hasdai Crescas

Or Adonai (Hebrew: אור אֲדֹנָי), The Light of the Lord, is the primary work of Rabbi Hasdai Crescas (c. 1340 – 1410/1411), a Jewish philosopher.

Or Adonai (Hebrew: אור אֲדֹנָי), The Light of the Lord, is the primary work of Rabbi Hasdai Crescas (c. 1340 – 1410/1411), a Jewish philosopher. As some Jews prefer to not use even the respectful title Adonai (Lord) other than in prayer (see names of God in Judaism), the book is sometimes called Or Hashem (אור השם) in verbal usage to avoid mentioning even this title of God directly.

A partial translation of Crescas was produced by Harry Austryn Wolfson of Harvard University in 1929.

== Purpose of the work ==
In the early medieval era there had been a tendency for some Jewish religious rationalists to reinterpret classical Jewish theology in the light of then-current philosophy, specifically neo-Aristotelian rationalism. This was the program of Jewish rationalist philosophers such as Saadia Gaon, Maimonides (who was influenced by Ibn Sina aka Avicenna), and Gersonides (who was influenced by Ibn Roshd, aka Averroes). In the view of Crescas, this point of view often led to mistaken conclusions, and threatened to blur the distinctiveness of the Jewish faith. He felt that this program reduced the doctrinal contents of Judaism to a surrogate of Aristotelian concepts.

Crescas makes no concealment of his purpose to vindicate classical Jewish thinking against the rationalism of Maimonides and Gersonides. Of these two the former especially had endeavored to harmonize revelation and faith with philosophy. While, in those instances where this harmony could not be established, Maimonides refused to follow Aristotle to the exclusion of Moses, his successors seemed bent upon the opposite course. For them philosophical rationalism was superior to classical religious thinking.

Crescas met the medieval rationalists as a philosopher who recognized the right of philosophical speculation. He did not agree with those Christian and Muslim theologians who in their speculations were advocates of a twofold truth, one for the theologian and the other for the philosopher, the former not cognizable by natural man, because supernatural and irrational, the latter open to the intelligence of natural man.

Crescas attempted to show that Aristotelian rationalism was far from infallible. In this, he is a precursor of Baruch Spinoza. Crescas deplores the fact that Maimonides, whose scholarship and honesty he otherwise admires, seemed to make Greek philosophy the basis for Jewish doctrine.

After attempting to show the untenability of the Aristotelian propositions, Crescas attempted to "establish the roots and the cornerstones upon which the Torah (i.e. Jewish religion) is propped, and the pivots upon which it turns" (from the preface.)

Crescas does not denounce heretics, but rather exposes the weakness of the ground on which those views he considers to be heterodox rest. He desires to set forth the contents of Judaism and the limitations in respect to them of the scope of philosophy. His book comprises four main divisions ("ma'amar"), subdivided into "kelalim" and chapters ("perakim"): the first treating of the foundation of all belief—the existence of God; the second, of the fundamental doctrines of the faith; the third, of other doctrines which, though not fundamental, are binding on every adherent of Judaism; the fourth, of doctrines which, though traditional, are without obligatory character, and which are open to philosophical construction.

== The first cause ==
The first main division opens with a thorough criticism of the twenty-five (or twenty-six) Aristotelian propositions ("hakdamot") which Maimonides accepts as axiomatic and out of which he constructs his idea of God.

In the first section he presents all the demonstrations for these theorems, especially those adduced by Tabrizi; in the second, he shows the inadequacy of many of these ontological and physical propositions, and thus demolishes Maimonides' proofs for his God-concept. Crescas, admitting that the existence of a first cause is susceptible of philosophic proof, but only by contingence (he rejects the Aristotelian assumption that an endless chain of causes is unthinkable; i.e., the first cause of all that is must be regarded as existent), holds philosophy to be incompetent to prove God's absolute unity, as does Ghazzali.

The first cause may be philosophically construed to be simple, for if it were composite another would have to be assumed for the compounding. Still, this would not necessitate the positing of God's unity. Other deities might with other functions still be in existence, even if our God were thought to be omnipotent. Therefore revelation alone is competent to establish God's unity. Without the creed of Shema Yisrael ("Hear, O Israel") philosophy fails to be a trusty guide.

Crescas introduces a new element into his idea of God. His predecessors contended that God's highest happiness, the divine essence, was God's own knowledge. Crescas rejects this as inadequate, and posits instead God's love, always intent upon communicating itself and doing good. He argues against Maimonides for the admissibility of divine attributes. From the human subjective point of view, attributes may appear to posit differences in God; but this does not mean that they do so in God objectively. In God, in the Absolutely Good, they merge as identical unity; predicates, especially of only logical or conceptual significance, are incompetent to cause real multiplicity or composition.

Since man is immeasurably the most eminent, to the point that there are those who believe it to be possible for him to become conjoined with and to become one with the active intellect, it follows necessarily that anyone who is closer to the active intellect in rank, will, because of his importance, be more subject to providence, and anything that is farther in rank will, because of its deficiency, be unworthy of having providence attach to it. It is fitting that it be so. For it is evident that, for God, all the intelligibles are actual, and man is in potentiality with respect to many of them. And it is evident with respect to that which is actual that it perfects and actualizes that which is in potentiality; and when there is transition from potentiality to actuality in the intelligibles, the agent and the acted-upon are one in some way. Therefore, from this perspective, it is fitting that the perfect man who intellects in actuality and who is conjoined to God and is one with Him, should have providence extend to him; and it is fitting that he who, despite having the potential and disposition, does not intellect in actuality since he has not acquired this union and attachment, be abandoned on account of his deficiency and defectiveness

— Hasdai Crescas

The knowledge of God is thus in every moment of existence: this can give us knowing about all things happen in the World, i.e. Providence; this can be the virtue of the best and higher wise man who is knowing on will and thinking of God. Wisdom and knowledge of providence may be the quality of "right-man", that in the Torah is the figure of sage, prophet and Tzaddik. Hasdai Crescas gives a vision about the providence of God also with Torah:

As our Sages of blessed memory said: "Declare three things before Me: kingship, remembrance, and shofar. Kingship—so that you will elect Me your king; remembrance—so that I will remember you for good; by what means?—by means of a shofar." This accords very well with what we have said, namely, that the shofar, which is an instrument customarily sounded on the day of the coronation of a king, as it is said: "And they sounded a shofar and the entire people proclaimed, 'May the king live,'" is worthy of being present on the day when the kingship of Heaven is affirmed in its uniqueness, in memory of the ram of Isaac that was caught in the thicket by its horns. It is in the nature of truth that it attests to itself and agrees with itself from all perspectives

— Hasdai Crescas

The sages of Israel teach that the "good" is from God, the King of Heaven and the Creator of the World He governs with providence, that is for the Avodah, the Temple of Jerusalem..."Sion" where Abraham, Yitzchak and Yakov find their eternal Brit with God.

== Six fundamental doctrines ==
In the second division Crescas enumerates six fundamental doctrines as presupposed by revealed faith, without which he believes Judaism would fall: God's omniscience, providence, and omnipotence; the belief in prophecy, Free will, and that the world was created for a purpose.

God's omniscience embraces all the innumerable individual beings; God has knowledge of what is as yet not in existence; God knows what of all possibilities will happen, though thereby the nature of the possible is not altered. God's knowledge is different from that of man: inferences from one to the other are not valid. (Here he sides with Maimonides against Gersonides.)

God's providence embraces directly and indirectly all species and individuals. It rewards and punishes, especially in the hereafter. Crescas rejects the theories of Maimonides and Gersonides on this point. Love, not knowledge (intellectual), is the bond between God and man. From God's love proceeds only what is good, and punishment is also inherently good. God's omnipotence is not merely infinite in time, but also in intensity.

Revelation, and it alone ("creatio ex nihilo"), makes it clear. Natural law is no limitation for God, but whatever is irrational proves neither God's omnipotence nor His lack of power; that is, God acts reasonably.

Prophecy is the highest degree of human mentality. Maimonides makes it dependent upon certain conditions. While Crescas admits this, he differs from Maimonides in that he will not admit the refusal of the prophetic gift when these conditions are fulfilled. Connection and communion with God are not brought about by knowledge, but by love and reverence, leading us to God if we keep His commandments.

Very extensive is Crescas's presentation of the freedom of the will. He inclines toward its rejection; at all events, to its limitation. The law of causality is so all-pervasive that human conduct can not withdraw itself from its operations. Moreover, God's omniscience anticipates our resolutions. But the Torah teaches the freedom of choice and presupposes our self-determination. Thus he concludes that the human will is free in certain respects, but determined in others. Will operates as a free agent when considered alone, but when regarded in relation to the remote cause, it acts by necessity; or, will operates in freedom, both per se and in regard to the provoking cause, but is bound if analyzed with reference to the divine omniscience. Man feels himself free; therefore he is responsible and must be rewarded or punished. The accompanying sentiment (readiness or disinclination to act) makes the deed our own.

== Purpose of the world ==
Maimonides rejected as futile and unwarranted all inquiry into the ultimate purpose of the world. Crescas posits such an ultimate purpose and assumes it to be the happiness of the soul. In this life the soul is intently striving after union with the divine; the laws of the Torah help to realize this, the soul's, never quiescent yearning. After death, the soul will enter upon greater possibilities of love, in the higher existence. Former thinkers made immortality depend on knowledge. Crescas believed that this was contrary to the teachings of religion, and also utterly unreasonable. Love, for Crescas, brings about the soul's happiness of eternal duration in the hereafter and the communion with God thereupon ensuing. "The soul is the form and essence of man, a subtle spiritual substance, capacitated for knowledge, but in its substance not yet cognizant."

By this definition Crescas attempts to establish the soul's independence of knowledge. Knowledge does not produce the soul. Man's highest perfection is not attained through knowledge, but principally through love, the tendency to, and longing for, the fountainhead of all good. Man's last purpose, his highest good, is love, manifested in obedience to God's laws. God's highest purpose is to make man participate in the eternal bliss to come.

The third main division devotes much attention to the theories concerning Creation. Whatever theory, however, be accepted, the belief in miracles and revelation is not affected. Religious tradition is so preponderatingly in favor of the assumption that the world and matter are created, and Gersonides' counter-reasoning is so inconclusive, that Crescas regards the denial of creation as heterodox. Immortality, punishment, reward, resurrection (a miracle, but not irrational), the irrevocability and eternal obligation of the Law, the belief in urim and thummim and Messianic redemption, are the other tenets treated as doctrines which should be accepted, but which are not strictly speaking, basic.

In the fourth division thirteen opinions are enumerated as open to speculative decision, among them the questions concerning the dissolution of the world. (Crescas holds the earth will pass away while the heavens will endure.) Have there been other worlds besides our own? Are the heavenly bodies endowed with soul and reason? Have amulets and incantations any significance? What are the "Shedim"? What about metempsychosis?

An opponent of Maimonides on philosophical grounds, Crescas was also dissatisfied with the method of Maimonides law code, the Mishneh Torah,. This was due to its absence of indications of the sources, the rare mention of divergent opinions, and the lack of provision to meet new cases, owing to its neglect to establish general principles of universal application ("Or Adonai", Preface).

If among Jews he exercised for a long time only through Joseph Albo any perceptible influence, though he was studied, for instance, by Don Isaac Abravanel, who controverts especially his Messianic theories, and by Abram Shalom in his Neveh Shalom, Crescas' work was of prime and fundamental importance through the part it had in the shaping of Baruch Spinoza's system. Spinoza's distinction between attributes and properties is identical with Crescas' distinction between attributes subjectively ascribed and their objective reality in God. The connection between Spinoza's views on creation and free will, on love of God and of others, and those of Crescas has been established by Joël in his "Zur Genesis der Lehre Spinoza's" (Breslau, 1871).

== Seven principles ==
...everyone yearns for the good. There is therefore no doubt that the absolute good that is God is in every religious person, and all love Him passionately and yearn for Him... And if a person were made aware that he is the recipient of God’s generosity, his love would grow even more... It is affirmed at the beginning of the great Hallel prayer that good is a genus encompassing all varieties of goodness: "Give thanks to the Lord, for He is good. His kindness endures forever." What is intended here is that God is the absolute good. Since it is fitting that the absolute good be eternal, it is said: "His kindness endures forever."

— "Or Adonai"

Hasdai Crescas teaches that there is the way of Torah to do with perfect view all Mitzvot, that is the service of all religious. All this is to obtain the "end of Torah": good, love and joy. Seven principles are the divine necessity.

== Eschatology ==
Therefore immortality is evident and necessitated in itself according to correct speculation. It is to this that Solomon alluded when he said: "But dust shall return to the earth as it was, and the spirit shall return unto God who bestowed it." There is a difference, however, between the material part and the spiritual. The simple components of the material will return to its elements and unite with them, since they are homogeneous and did not acquire through matter a stable perfection, since matter is constantly moving and changing. But it is fitting and necessary that the spiritual part, insofar as it acquired, by way of its apprehension, perfection and attachment to the Supreme Light which is stable and unchanging, remain stable in itself and in its perfection. This indeed necessitates immortality

— Hasdai Crescas

Ample space is then given to the end of the World, that is to the end of the universe which could dissolve into nothingness; the world (the creation and "creatures", i.e. humankind, animals and Nature) is finite precisely because matter isn’t spiritual while spirituality falls within the scope of eternal life: the soul and body (earth in hebrew "Adamà" and Adam is the first man who is created by God from the four types of dust in the world, that is from North, South, East and West… "Memento, homo, quia pulvis es, et in pulverem reverteris", so Adam in rabbinic literature is the correlation between spirit and matter). God created the World with mercy and grace and the Chakhamim, Jewish sages, deduced that God could create other worlds after the end of this one while still with the doubt whether this could persist eternally: in "Or Hashem" or "Or Adonai" and in Jewish liturgical song "Adon Olam" the end of world is mentioned, all this without reference about Olam HaBa:

I say, furthermore, that with this act (Miracle) the end of the creation of the human species is fulfilled, which is in itself identical with the end intended by the Torah, as we discussed earlier at the end of Book II. This is so—whether in respect of the Creator or in respect of man. This end is the complete uniting with and attachment to God. In respect of God, it is the utmost benefaction possible, as was established there. Since this is so, it is fitting that it be fulfilled by means of one who was privileged to experience this uniting constantly—and such a one is Elijah who is remembered for good

— Hasdai Crescas
