= Iranian Studies Series =

Series of academic publications

The Iranian Studies Series was founded in 2007 and is co-published by Rozenberg Publishers in Amsterdam and Purdue University Press in West Lafayette, Indiana. It publishes scholarship on various aspects of Iranian civilisation, covering both contemporary and classical cultures of the Persian cultural area.

The contemporary Persian-speaking area includes Iran, Afghanistan, Tajikistan, and Central Asia, while classical societies using Persian as a literary and cultural language were located in Anatolia, Caucasus, Central Asia and South Asia. The objective of the series is to foster studies of the literary, historical, religious and linguistic products in Iranian languages. In addition to research monographs and reference works, the series publishes English-Persian critical text-editions of important texts.

Publications in 2007 include The Essence of Modernity, a parallel Persian-English edition of Mirza Yusof Khan Mustahar ad-Dowla's Yak Kaleme; and three volumes of essays in Iranian studies: The Treasury of Tabriz (Safine-ye Tabriz), The Necklace of the Pleiades: Studies in Persian Literature Presented to Heshmat Moayyad on his 80th Birthday (edited by Franklin Lewis and Sunil Sharma); and Gog and Magog: the clans of chaos in world literature.
