= Razi dialect =

Extinct Iranian language of northern Iran

Razi
- Rhazi
- Native to: Iran
- Region: Ray
- Era: Early Islamic period
- Language family: Indo-European: Indo-Iranian; Iranian; Western; Northwestern; Median; Razi
- Writing system: Persian alphabet

Language codes
- ISO 639-3: –
- Glottolog: None

The Razi dialect was a northwestern Iranian language spoken in the city of Ray, located on the southern slopes of the Alborz mountain range situated near Tehran, the capital of Iran. It was most likely a continuation of the Median language. The language was seemingly very similar to the Parthian language. The only surviving text written in Razi is by Bundar Razi (died 1010/11), a Shi'ite poet who was part of the court of Majd al-Dawla (r. 997–1029), the amir (ruler) of the Buyid branch of Ray. As Ray was located in the historical region of Media, its local language in the pre-Islamic era, according to the modern historian Hassan Rezai Baghbidi, must have been Median.

The oldest surviving source that refers to the Razi dialect is a book that the Arab geographer al-Muqaddasi (died 991) wrote in the 10th-century;

The people of Ray change their names, instead of ʿAlī, Ḥasan and Aḥmad, they say ʿlkʾ / Alkā/, ḥskʾ /Haskā/, ḥmkʾ /Hamkā/ … in Ray they use rā, they say rʾdh /rā-dah/ “give!”, rʾkn /rā-kun/ “do!” … among the languages of the aʿājim (i. e. the Iranian people) there is no language more attractive than that of the people of Ray.

Some of the words used in the Tehrani dialect may derive from Razi, such as sūsk "beetle; cockroach", jīrjīrak "cricket", zālzālak "haw(thorn)", and vejīn "weeding".

== Sources ==
- Baghbidi, Hassan Rezai (2016). "The Linguistic History of Rayy up to the Early Islamic Period". Der Islam. 93 (2). De Gruyter: 403–412. doi:10.1515/islam-2016-0034.
