= Old Persian =

Old Iranian language

- 𐎠𐎼𐎹 Ariya
- Region: Ancient Iran
- Era: Evolved into Middle Persian by c. 300 BCE
- Language family: Indo-European: Indo-Iranian; Iranian; Western; Southwestern; Old Persian
- Writing system: Old Persian cuneiform

Language codes
- ISO 639-2: peo
- ISO 639-3: peo
- Glottolog: oldp1254

Old Persian is one of two directly attested Old Iranian languages (the other being Avestan) and is the ancestor of Middle Persian (the language of the Sasanian Empire). Like other Old Iranian languages, it was known to its native speakers as ariya (Iranian). Old Persian is close to Avestan and both languages are highly inflected.

Old Persian appears primarily in the inscriptions, clay tablets and seals of the Achaemenid era (c. 600 BCE to 300 BCE). Examples of Old Persian have been found in what is now Iran, Armenia, Bahrain, Iraq, Turkey and Egypt, with the most important attestation by far being the contents of the Behistun Inscription (dated to 522 BCE).

In 2007, research into the vast Persepolis Administrative Archives at the Oriental Institute at the University of Chicago unearthed Old Persian tablets, which suggest Old Persian was a written language in use for practical recording and not only for royal display.

== Origin and overview ==
As a written language, Old Persian is attested in royal Achaemenid inscriptions. It is an Iranian language and as such a member of the Indo-Iranian branch of the Indo-European language family. The oldest known text written in Old Persian is from the Behistun Inscriptions. Old Persian is one of the oldest Indo-European languages which are attested in original texts.

The oldest date of use of Old Persian as a spoken language is not precisely known. According to certain historical assumptions about the early history and origin of ancient Persians in Southwestern Iran (where the Achaemenids hailed from), Old Persian was originally spoken by a tribe called Parsuwash, who arrived in the Iranian Plateau early in the 1st millennium BCE and finally migrated down into the area of present-day Fārs province. Their language, Old Persian, became the official language of the Achaemenid kings. Assyrian records, which in fact appear to provide the earliest evidence for ancient Iranian (Persian and Median) presence on the Iranian Plateau, give a good chronology but only an approximate geographical indication of what seem to be ancient Persians. In these records of the 9th century BCE, Parsuwash (along with Matai, presumably Medians) are first mentioned in the area of Lake Urmia in the records of Shalmaneser III. The exact identity of the Parsuwash is not known for certain, but from a linguistic viewpoint the word matches Old Persian pārsa itself coming directly from the older word *pārćwa. Also, as Old Persian contains many words from another extinct Iranian language, Median, according to P. O. Skjærvø it is probable that Old Persian had already been spoken before the formation of the Achaemenid Empire and was spoken during most of the first half of the first millennium BCE.

== Classification ==
Old Persian belongs to the Iranian language family, a branch of the Indo-Iranian language family, itself within the large family of Indo-European languages. The common ancestors of Indo-Iranians came from Central Asia sometime in the first half of the 2nd millennium BCE. The extinct and unattested Median language is another Old Iranian language related to Old Persian; both are classified as Western Iranian languages, and many Median names appear in Old Persian texts. The group of Old Iranian languages was presumably large; however, knowledge of it is restricted mainly to Old Persian, Avestan, and Median. The first two are the only languages in that group to have left written original texts, while Median is known mostly from loanwords in Old Persian.

== Language evolution ==
By the 4th century BCE, the late Achaemenid period, the inscriptions of Artaxerxes II and Artaxerxes III differ enough from the language of Darius' inscriptions to be called a "pre-Middle Persian," or "post-Old Persian". Old Persian subsequently evolved into Middle Persian, which is in turn the ancestor of New Persian.

Professor Gilbert Lazard, a famous Iranologist and the author of the book Persian Grammar, states:

The language known as New Persian, which usually is called at this period (early Islamic times) by the name of Parsi-Dari, can be classified linguistically as a continuation of Middle Persian, the official religious and literary language of Sassanian Iran, itself a continuation of Old Persian, the language of the Achaemenids. Unlike the other languages and dialects, ancient and modern, of the Iranian group such as Avestan, Parthian, Soghdian, Pashto, etc., Old, Middle and New Persian represent one and the same language at three states of its history. It had its origin in Fars and is differentiated by dialectical features, still easily recognizable from the dialect prevailing in north-western and eastern Iran.

Middle Persian, also sometimes called Pahlavi, is a direct continuation of Old Persian and was used as the written official language of the country. Comparison of the evolution at each stage of the language shows great simplification in grammar and syntax. However, New Persian is a direct descendant of Middle and Old Persian.

== Substrates ==
Old Persian contains numerous loanwords from the Median language, which was presumably a substrate of Old Persian. The Median element is identifiable because it did not share in the developments that were peculiar to Old Persian. Median words can be found in all parts of the lexicon, though some forms appear only in proper names, while others appear primarily in religious vocabulary and thus may include some Avestan influence. Some words are attested with both their Old Persian and Median forms, such as the word for 'horse', which is attested in Old Persian as both asa (Old Persian) and aspa (Median).

== Script ==
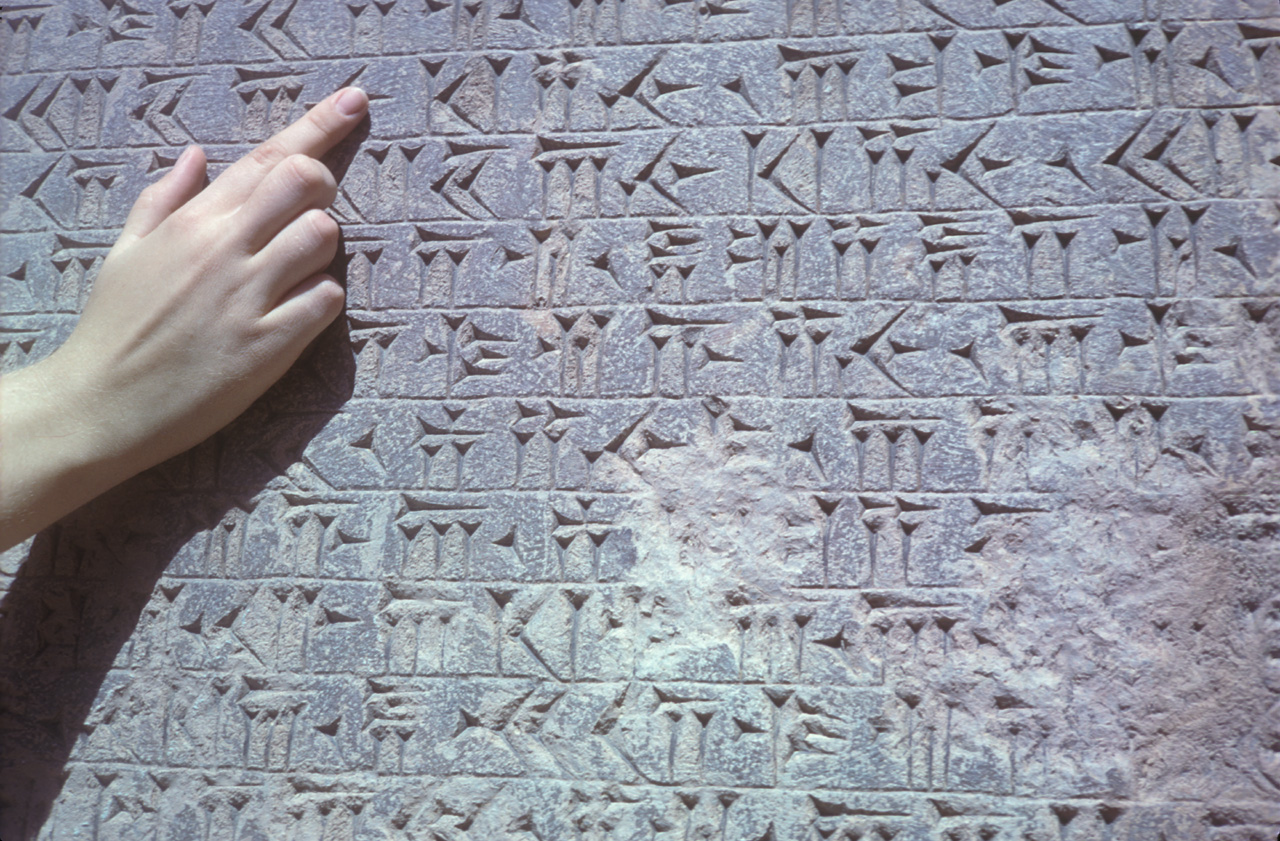
Close-up of the Behistun inscription

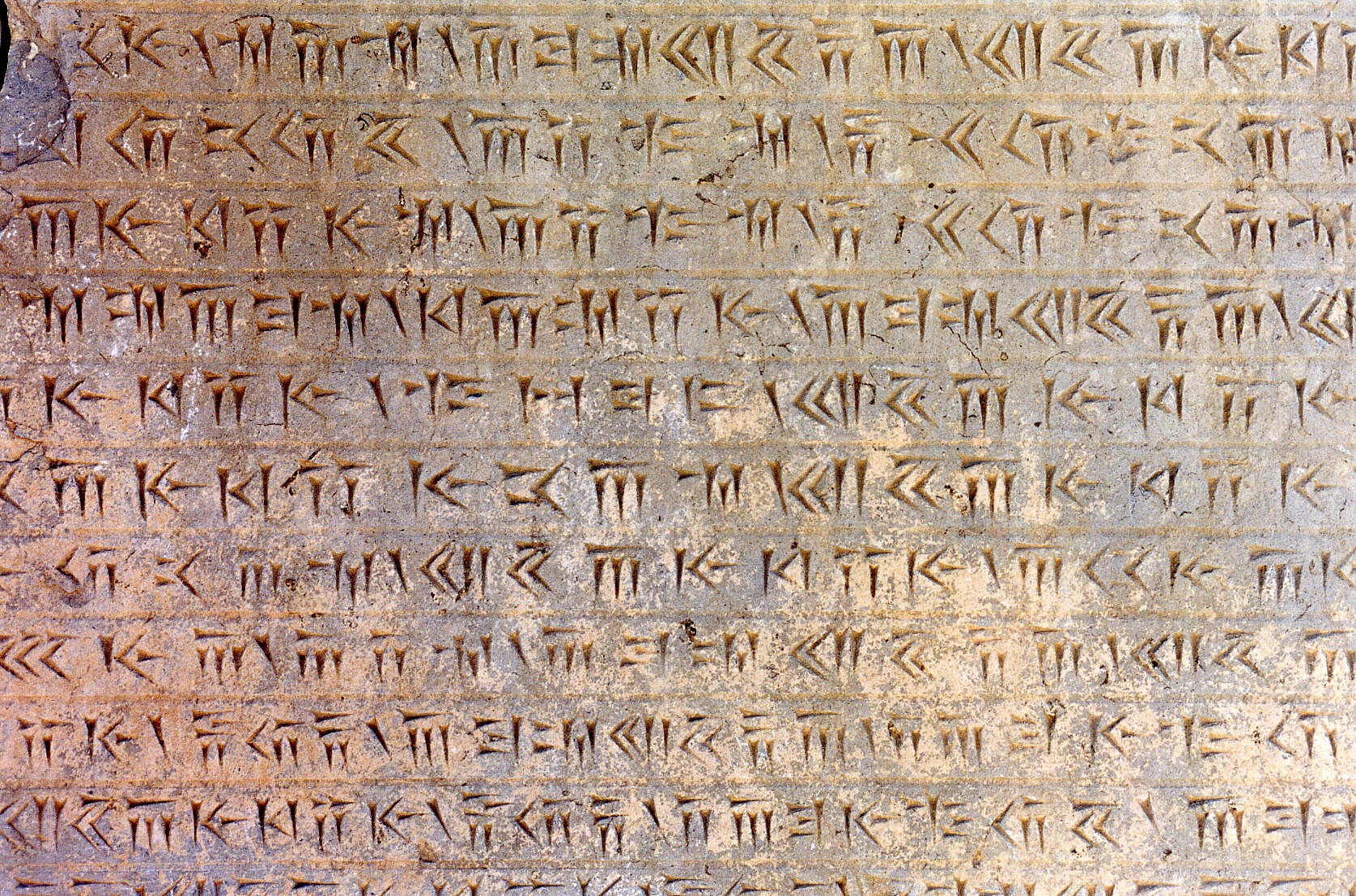
An Old Persian inscription in Persepolis

Old Persian texts were written from left to right in the syllabic Old Persian cuneiform script and had 36 phonetic characters and 8 logograms. The usage of logograms is not obligatory. The script was surprisingly not a result of evolution of the script used in the nearby civilisation of Mesopotamia. Despite the fact that Old Persian was written in cuneiform script, the script was not a direct continuation of Mesopotamian tradition and in fact, according to Schmitt, was a "deliberate creation of the sixth century BCE".

The origin of the Old Persian cuneiform script and the identification of the date and process of introduction are a matter of debate among Iranian scholars with no general agreement having been reached. The factors making the consensus difficult are, among others, the difficult passage DB (IV lines 88–92) from Darius the Great who speaks of a new "form of writing" being made by himself which is said to be "in Aryan":

King Darius says: By the grace of Ahuramazda this is the inscription which I have made. Besides, it was in Aryan ("ariyâ") script, and it was composed on clay tablets and on parchment. Besides, a sculptured figure of myself I made.

— Behistun Inscription (IV lines 88–92)

Also, the analysis of certain Old Persian inscriptions are "supposed or claimed" to predate Darius the Great. Although it is true that the oldest attested Old Persian inscriptions are found on the Behistun monument from Darius, the creation of this "new type of writing" seems, according to Schmitt, "to have begun already under Cyrus the Great".

The script shows a few changes in the shape of characters during the period it was used. This can be seen as a standardization of the heights of wedges, which in the beginning (i.e. in DB) took only half the height of a line.

== Phonology ==
The following phonemes are expressed in the Old Persian script:

Vowels
	Front		Back	
Close	i	iː	u	uː
Open		a	aː	

Consonants
	Labial		Dental/ Alveolar		Palatal		Velar		Glottal
Nasal		m		n					
Plosive	p	b	t	d			k	ɡ	
Fricative	f	v	θ				x		h
Affricate			t͡s		t͡ʃ	d͡ʒ			
Sibilant			s	z	ʃ				
Rhotic				r					
Approximant				l		j		w	

Most phonemes are conventionally transcribed with the corresponding IPA symbols shown on this table, including θ, x for /θ, x/. The exceptions are c, j, y, ç, as the first three letters are used for /t͡ʃ d͡ʒ j/, and ç is used for the remaining phoneme (𐏂 in the native script, of uncertain pronunciation but perhaps an affricate or sibilant of some kind).

Lycian 𐊋𐊆𐊈𐊈𐊀𐊓𐊕𐊑𐊏𐊀 Kizzaprñna ~ 𐊈𐊆𐊖𐊀𐊓𐊕𐊑𐊏𐊀 Zisaprñna for (genuine) Old Persian *Ciçafarnā (besides the Median form *Ciθrafarnah) = Tissaphernes suggests /t͡s/ as the pronunciation of ç (compare and Kloekhorst 2008, p. 125 in for this example, who, however, mistakenly writes Çiçafarnā, which contradicts the etymology [PIIr. *Čitra-swarnas-] and the Middle Persian form Čehrfar [ç gives Middle Persian s]).

The phoneme /l/ does not occur in native Iranian vocabulary, only in borrowings from Akkadian (a new /l/ develops in Middle Persian from Old Persian /rd/ and the change of /rθ/ to /hl/). The phoneme /r/ can also form a syllable peak; both the way Persian names with syllabic /r/ (such as Brdiya) are rendered in Elamite and its further development in Middle Persian suggest that before the syllabic /r/, an epenthetic vowel [i] had developed already in the Old Persian period, which later became [u] after labials. For example, Old Persian Vᵃ-rᵃ-kᵃ-a-nᵃ /wr̩kaːna/ is rendered in Elamite as Mirkānu-, rendering transcriptions such as V(a)rakāna, Varkāna or even Vurkāna questionable and making Vrkāna or Virkāna much more realistic (and equally for vrka- "wolf", Brdiya and other Old Persian words and names with syllabic /r/).

While v usually became /v/ in Middle Persian, it became /b/ word-initially in New Persian, except before [u] (including the epenthetic vowel mentioned above), where it became /ɡ/. This suggests that it was really pronounced as [w].

== Grammar ==
=== Grammatical numbers ===
Old Persian has 3 types of grammatical number: singular, dual and plural.

=== Grammatical genders ===
Old Persian has three grammatical genders: masculine, feminine and neuter. In contrast, Modern Persian (as well as Middle Persian) is a genderless language.

=== Nouns ===
Old Persian stems:

- a-stems (-a, -am, -ā)
- i-stems (-iš, iy)
- u- (and au-) stems (-uš, -uv)
- consonantal stems (n, r, h)

	-a			-am			-ā		
	Singular	Dual	Plural	Singular	Dual	Plural	Singular	Dual	Plural
Nominative	-a	-ā	-ā, -āha	-am	-ā	-ā	-ā	-ā	-ā
Vocative	-ā	-ā	-ā	-am	-ā	-ā	-ā	-ā	-ā
Accusative	-am	-ā	-ā	-am	-ā	-ā	-ām	-ā	-ā
Instrumental/ Ablative	-ā	-aibiyā	-aibiš	-ā	-aibiyā	-aibiš	-āyā	-ābiyā	-ābiš
Dative	-ahyā, -ahya	-aibiyā	-aibiš	-ahyā, -ahya	-aibiyā	-aibiš	-āyā	-ābiyā	-ābiš
Genitive	-ahyā, -ahya	-āyā	-ānām	-ahyā, -ahya	-āyā	-ānām	-āyā	-āyā	-ānām
Locative	-aiy	-āyā	-aišuvā	-aiy	-āyā	-aišuvā	-āyā	-āyā	-āšuvā

	-iš			-iy			-uš			-uv		
	Singular	Dual	Plural	Singular	Dual	Plural	Singular	Dual	Plural	Singular	Dual	Plural
Nominative	-iš	-īy	-iya	-iy	-in	-īn	-uš	-ūv	-uva	-uv	-un	-ūn
Vocative	-i	-īy	-iya	-iy	-in	-īn	-u	-ūv	-uva	-uv	-un	-ūn
Accusative	-im	-īy	-iš	-iy	-in	-īn	-um	-ūv	-ūn	-uv	-un	-ūn
Instrumental/ Ablative	-auš	-ībiyā	-ībiš	-auš	-ībiyā	-ībiš	-auv	-ūbiyā	-ūbiš	-auv	-ūbiyā	-ūbiš
Dative	-aiš	-ībiyā	-ībiš	-aiš	-ībiyā	-ībiš	-auš	-ūbiyā	-ūbiš	-auš	-ūbiyā	-ūbiš
Genitive	-aiš	-īyā	-īnām	-aiš	-īyā	-īnām	-auš	-ūvā	-ūnām	-auš	-ūvā	-ūnām
Locative	-auv	-īyā	-išuvā	-auv	-īyā	-išuvā	-āvā	-ūvā	-ušuvā	-āvā	-ūvā	-ušuvā

Adjectives are declined in a similar way.

=== Verbs ===
Voices
Active, Middle (them. pres. -aiy-, -ataiy-), Passive (-ya-).

Mostly the forms of first and third persons are attested. The only preserved Dual form is ajīvatam 'both lived'.

Present Active
		Athematic	Thematic
		'be'	'bring'
Sg.	1.pers.	aʰmiy	barāmiy
Sg.	3.pers.	astiy	baratiy
Pl.	1.pers.	aʰmahiy	barāmahiy
Pl.	3.pers.	hatiy	baratiy

Imperfect Active
		Athematic	Thematic
		'do, make'	'be, become'
Sg.	1.pers.	akunavam	abavam
Sg.	3.pers.	akunauš	abava
Pl.	1.pers.	akumā	abavāmā
Pl.	3.pers.	akunava	abava

Present participle
Active	Middle
-nt-	-amna-

Past participle
-ta-

Infinitive
-tanaiy

== Sample text ==
Here's the opening line of the Darius Naqsh-e Rostam inscription "a".

Old Persian

𐎲𐎥 𐏐 𐎺𐏀𐎼𐎣 𐏐 𐎠𐎢𐎼𐎶𐏀𐎭𐎠 𐏐 𐏃𐎹 𐏐 𐎡𐎶𐎠𐎶 𐏐 𐎲𐎢𐎷𐎡𐎶 𐏐 𐎠𐎭𐎠 𐏐 𐏃𐎹 𐏐 𐎠𐎺𐎶 𐏐 𐎠𐎿𐎶𐎠𐎴𐎶 𐏐 𐎠𐎭𐎠 𐏐 𐏃𐎹 𐏐 𐎶𐎼𐎫𐎡𐎹𐎶 𐏐 𐎠𐎭𐎠 𐏐 𐏃𐎹 𐏐 𐏁𐎡𐎹𐎠𐎫𐎡𐎶 𐏐 𐎠𐎭𐎠 𐏐 𐎶𐎼𐎫𐎡𐎹𐏃𐎹𐎠 𐏐 𐏃𐎹 𐏐 𐎭𐎠𐎼𐎹𐎺𐎢𐎶 𐏐 𐎧𐏁𐎠𐎹𐎰𐎡𐎹𐎶 𐏐 𐎠𐎤𐎢𐎴𐎢𐏁 𐏐 𐎠𐎡𐎺𐎶 𐏐 𐎱𐎽𐎢𐎺𐎴𐎠𐎶 𐏐 𐎧𐏁𐎠𐎹𐎰𐎡𐎹𐎶 𐏐 𐎠𐎡𐎺𐎶 𐏐 𐎱𐎽𐎢𐎺𐎴𐎠𐎶 𐏐 𐎳𐎼𐎶𐎠𐎫𐎠𐎼𐎶

Transliteration

baga vazraka Auramazdā hya imām būmim adā hya avam asmānam adā hya martiyam adā hya šiyātim adā martiyahyā hya Dārayavaum xšāyaθiyam akunauš aivam parūvnām xšāyaθiyam aivam parūvnām framātāram

English translation

A great god is Ahura Mazda, who created this earth, who created yonder sky, who created man, who created happiness for man, who made Darius king, one king of many, one lord of many.

== Lexicon ==
Proto-Iranian	Old Persian	Middle Persian	Modern Persian	meaning
*Háhurah mazdáH	Auramazdā (𐎠𐎢𐎼𐎶𐏀𐎭𐎠)	Ohrmazd 𐭠𐭥𐭧𐭥𐭬𐭦𐭣	Hormazd هرمزد	Ahura Mazda (supreme God)
*Hácwah	asa (𐎠𐎿)	asp	asb اسب / asp اسپ	horse
*káHmah	kāma (𐎣𐎠𐎶)	kām	kām کام	desire
*daywáh	daiva (𐎭𐎡𐎺)	dēw	dīv دیو	devil
*jráyah	drayah (𐎭𐎼𐎹)	drayā	daryā دریا	sea
*jástah	dasta (𐎭𐎿𐎫)	dast 𐭩𐭣𐭤	dast دست	hand
*bāǰíš	bājiš (𐎲𐎠𐎩𐎡𐏁)	bāj	bāj باج / bāž باژ	toll
*bráHtā	brātā (𐎲𐎼𐎠𐎫𐎠)	brād(ar)	barādar برادر	brother
*búHmiš	būmiš (𐏏)	būm 𐭡𐭥𐭬	būm بوم	region, land
*mártyah	martya (𐎶𐎼𐎫𐎡𐎹)	mard	mard مرد	man
*mā́Hah	māha (𐎶𐎠𐏃)	māh 𐭡𐭩𐭥𐭧	māh ماه	moon, month
*wáhr̥	vāhara (𐎺𐎠𐏃𐎼)	wahār	bahār بهار	spring
*stuHnáH	stūnā (𐎿𐎬𐎢𐎴𐎠)	stūn	sotūn ستون	stand (column)
*čyaHtáh	šiyāta (𐏁𐎡𐎹𐎠𐎫)	šād	šād شاد	happy
*Hr̥tám	artam (𐎠𐎼𐎫𐎶)	ard	ord ارد	order, truth
*dráwgah	drauga (𐎭𐎼𐎢𐎥)	drōw	dorūğ دروغ	lie
*cwáHdaH	spāda (𐎿𐎱𐎠𐎭)	spah 𐭮𐭯𐭠𐭧	sepāh سپاه	army
*nápāth	napā (𐎴𐎱𐎠)	nab	nave نوه	grandson

== See also ==
- Category:Old Persian language
- Middle Persian
- New Persian

== Bibliography ==
- Brandenstein, Wilhelm (1964), Handbuch des Altpersischen, Wiesbaden: O. Harrassowitz
- Hinz, Walther (1966), Altpersischer Wortschatz, Nendeln, Liechtenstein: Kraus
- Frye, Richard Nelson (1984). Handbuch der Altertumswissenschaft: Alter Orient-Griechische Geschichte-Römische Geschichte. Band III,7: The History of Ancient Iran. C.H.Beck. ISBN 978-3406093975.
- Kent, Roland G. (1953), Old Persian: Grammar, Texts, Lexicon, New Haven: American Oriental Society
- Kuhrt, A. (2013). The Persian Empire: A Corpus of Sources from the Achaemenid Period. Routledge. ISBN 978-1136016943.
- Sims-Williams, Nicholas (1996), "Iranian languages", Encyclopedia Iranica, vol. 7, Costa Mesa: Mazda: 238–245
- Schmitt, Rüdiger (1989), "Altpersisch", in R. Schmitt (ed.), Compendium linguarum Iranicarum, Wiesbaden: Reichert: 56–85
- Schmitt, Rüdiger (2000). The Old Persian Inscriptions of Naqsh-i Rustam and Persepolis. Corpus Inscriptionum Iranicarum by School of Oriental and African Studies. ISBN 978-0728603141.
- Schmitt, Rüdiger (2008), "Old Persian", in Roger D. Woodard (ed.), The Ancient Languages of Asia and the Americas (illustrated ed.), Cambridge University Press, pp. 76–100, ISBN 978-0521684941
- Skjærvø, Prods Oktor (2005), An Introduction to Old Persian (PDF) (2nd ed.), Cambridge: Harvard, archived from the original (PDF) on Sep 25, 2021
- Skjærvø, Prods Oktor (2006), "Iran, vi. Iranian languages and scripts", Encyclopaedia Iranica, vol. 13
- Tolman, Herbert Cushing (1908), Ancient Persian Lexicon and the Texts of the Achaemenidan Inscriptions Transliterated and Translated with Special Reference to Their Recent Re-examination, New York/Cincinnati: American Book Company
