= Bundar Razi =

Iranian poet

Bundar Razi (Persian: بندار رازی) was an Iranian poet of the 10th and 11th centuries, who composed poetry in New Persian and his own local dialect. A native of Ray, Bundar served at the court of the Buyid ruler Majd al-Dawla (r. 997–1029).

According to the modern historian Hassan Rezai Baghbidi, while the local dialect that Bundar wrote in has been called Fahlawi or even Daylami, it is in reality the Razi dialect.

== Sources ==
- Baghbidi, Hassan Rezai (2016). "The Linguistic History of Rayy up to the Early Islamic Period". Der Islam. 93 (2). De Gruyter: 403–412. doi:10.1515/islam-2016-0034.
- de Blois, Francois (2004). Persian Literature - A Bio-Bibliographical Survey: Poetry of the Pre-Mongol Period (Volume V). Routledge. ISBN 978-0947593476.
- Safa, Zabihollah (1989). "Bondār Rāzī". In Yarshater, Ehsan (ed.). Encyclopædia Iranica. Vol. IV/4: Bolbol I–Brick. London and New York: Routledge & Kegan Paul. p. 350. ISBN 978-0-71009-127-7.
- Tafazzoli, Ahmad (1999). "Fahlavīyāt". In Yarshater, Ehsan (ed.). Encyclopædia Iranica. Vol. IX/2: Excavations IV–Fārābī V. Music. London and New York: Routledge & Kegan Paul. pp. 158–162. ISBN 978-0-933273-27-6.
