= Median language =

Ancient Iranian language

Median
- Medean, Medic
- Native to: Media
- Region: Ancient Iran
- Ethnicity: Medes
- Era: 500 BCE – 500 CE
- Language family: Indo-European: Indo-Iranian; Iranian; Western Iranian; Northwestern; Median
- Dialects: Razi
- Writing system: Linear Elamite?

Language codes
- ISO 639-3: xme
- Glottolog: None

Median (also Medean or Medic) is an extinct Iranian language which was spoken by the ancient Medes. It is classified within the Northwestern branch of the Iranian language family, a group that encompasses numerous distinct languages attested in significantly more recent periods. The language is posited to be the ancestor of Parthian and, depending on how broadly Old Median is defined, of several modern Northwestern Iranian languages, including the central Iranian languages and dialects, the Tati and Caspian groups, Gorani/Awromani, and Zaza. (Note: Borjian writes: "As there are no solid isoglottic features that distinguish Median from proto-Parthian, the linguistic interpretation of Old Median (already with many dialects) can be made as broad as to consider it an ancestor to Parthian and all other Northwest Iranian languages, including Central Dialects, the Tatic and Caspian groups, Gorani-Awromani, and Zaza.")

== Attestation ==
Median is attested only by numerous loanwords in Old Persian. Nothing is known of its grammar, “but it shares important phonological isoglosses with Avestan, rather than Old Persian. Under the short lived period of Median rule … Median must to some extent have been the official Iranian language in western Iran”. No documents dating to Median times have been preserved, and it is not known what script these texts might have been in. So far only one inscription of pre-Achaemenid times (a bronze plaque) has been found on the territory of Media from the time Media and Persia were under the control of the Neo-Assyrian Empire. This is a cuneiform inscription composed by the Assyrian rulers in Akkadian, perhaps in the 8th century BCE, but no Median names are mentioned in it.

=== Words ===
Words of Median origin include:

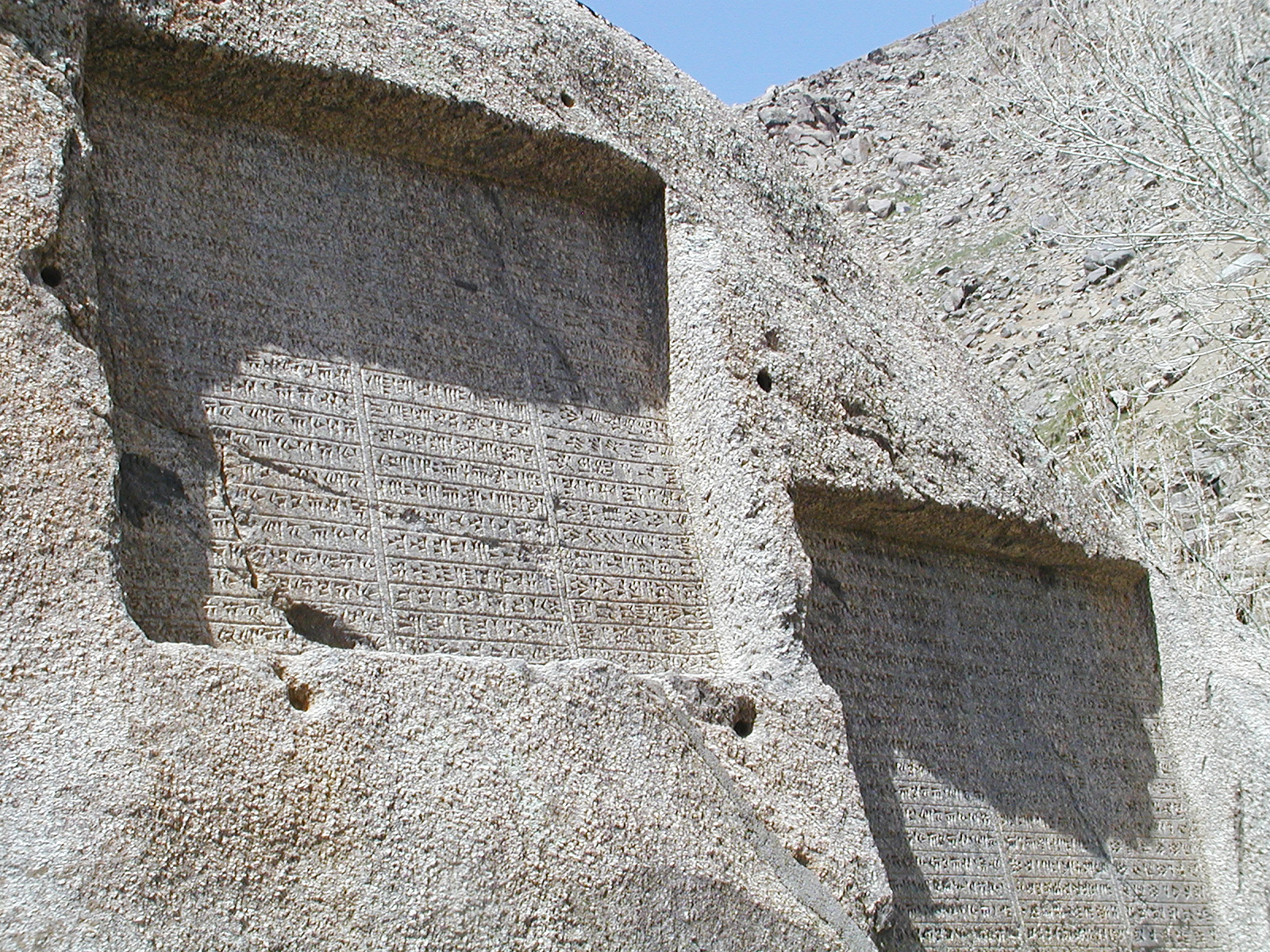
The Ganj Nameh ("treasure epistle") in Ecbatana. The inscriptions are by Darius I and his son Xerxes I.

- *čiθra-: "origin". The word appears in *čiθrabṛzana- (med.) "exalting his linage", *čiθramiθra- (med.) "having mithraic origin", *čiθraspāta- (med.) "having a brilliant army", etc.
- Paridaiza: Paradise
- Spaka-: The word is Median and means "dog". Herodotus identifies "Spaka-" (Gk. "σπάχα" – female dog) as Median rather than Persian. The word in a similar form is still used in some modern Iranian languages including Talyshi, Zaza also suggested as a source to the Slavic Russian собака (sobaka) with the same meaning.
- vazṛka-: "great" (as Western Persian bozorg)
- vispa-: "all" (as in Avestan). The component appears in such words as vispafryā (Med. fem.) "dear to all", vispatarva- (med.) "vanquishing all"
- xšaθra- (realm; kingship): This Median word (attested in *xšaθra-pā- and continued by Middle Persian šahr "land, country; city") is an example of words whose Greek form (known as romanized "satrap" from Gk. σατράπης satrápēs) mirrors, as opposed to the tradition, (Note: "..a great many Old Persian lexemes...are preserved in a borrowed form in non-Persian languages – the so-called "collateral" tradition of Old Persian (within or outside the Achaemenid Empire).... not every purported Old Iranian form attested in this manner is an actual lexeme of Old Persian.") a Median rather than an Old Persian form (also attested, as xšaça- and xšaçapāvā) of an Old Iranian word.
- zūra-: "evil" and zūrakara-: "evil-doer". Similar words, zūre and zūreker are found in Zaza, which mean "lie/ to deceive" and "the liar/the deceiver".

== Predecessor of modern Iranian languages ==
A number of modern Iranian languages spoken today have had medieval stages with attestations found in Classical and Early Modern Persian sources. G. Windfuhr believes that the "modern [Iranian] languages of Azarbaijan and Central Iran, located in ancient Media and Atropatene, are 'Median' dialects" and that those languages "continue the lost local and regional language" of Old Median, and bear similarity to "Medisms in Old Persian". The term Pahlav/Fahlav (see fahlaviyat) in traditional medieval Persian sources is also used to refer to regionalisms in Persian poetry from western Iran that reflect the period of Parthian rule of those regions, but Windfuhr also ascribes some of these to older Median influence and their languages "being survivals of the Median dialects have certain linguistic affinities with Parthian". The most notable New Median languages and dialects are spoken in central Iran, especially around Kashan. The Northwestern Iranian languages and dialects such as Kurdish, Balochi, Parthian, Old Azeri, Tati, Talysh, Zaza, Gilaki, Mazanderani and some central Iranian dialects have strong Median element and they are considered descended from Median.Specifically in the Zagros Mountains and northwestern Iran.

== Identity ==
A distinction from other Iranic ethnolinguistic groups such as the Persians, Scythians and Cimmerians is evident primarily in foreign sources, such as from mid-9th-century BCE to late 7th century BCE Assyrian cuneiform sources which clearly distinguish these peoples from one another and from Herodotus' mid-5th-century BCE secondhand account of the Perso-Median conflict. It is not known what the native name of the Median language was (just like for all other Old Iranian languages) or whether the Medes themselves nominally distinguished it from the languages of other Iranian peoples. The Assyrians who ruled over both the Medes and Persians from the early 9th to late 7th centuries BC called them Manda and Parshumash, respectively.

Median is presumed to have been a substrate of the official Old Persian used in the Achaemenid Empire. As Prods Oktor Skjærvø explains, the Median element is readily identifiable because it did not share in the developments that were particular to Old Persian. Median forms "are found only in personal or geographical names […] and some are typically from religious vocabulary and so could in principle also be influenced by Avestan […]. Sometimes, both Median and Old Persian forms are found, which gave Old Persian a somewhat confusing and inconsistent look: 'horse,' for instance, is [attested in Old Persian as] both asa (OPers.) and aspa (Med.)."

Using comparative phonology of proper names attested in Old Persian, Roland Kent notes several other Old Persian words that appear to be borrowings from Median: for example, taxma, 'brave', as in the proper name Taxmaspada. Diakonoff includes paridaiza, 'paradise'; vazraka, 'great' and xshayathiya, 'royal'. In the mid-5th century BCE, Herodotus (Histories 1.110) noted that spaka is the Median word for a female dog. This term and meaning are preserved in living Iranian languages such as Talysh and Zaza language.

In the 1st century BCE, Strabo (c. 64BCE–24CE) would note a relationship between the various Iranian peoples and their languages: "[From] beyond the Indus... Ariana is extended so as to include some part of Persia, Media, and the north of Bactria and Sogdiana; for these nations speak nearly the same language." (Geography, 15.2.1-15.2.8)

Traces of the (later) dialects of Media (not to be confused with the Median language) are preserved in the compositions of the fahlaviyat genre, verse composed in the old dialects of the Pahla/Fahla regions of Iran's northwest. Consequently, these compositions have "certain linguistic affinities" with Parthian, but the surviving specimens (which are from the 9th to 18th centuries CE) are much influenced by Persian. For an enumeration of linguistic characteristics and vocabulary "deserving mention", see Tafazzoli 1999. The use of fahla (from Middle Persian pahlaw) to denote Media is attested from late Arsacid times so it reflects the pre-Sassanid use of the word to denote "Parthia", which, during Arsacid times, included most of what had once been Media.

== See also ==
- Madai
