= Fahlavīyāt =

Fahlaviyat (Persian: فهلویات, romanized: Fahlawiyāt), also spelled fahlavi (فهلوی), was a designation for poetry composed in the local northwestern Iranian dialects and languages of the Fahla region, which comprised Isfahan, Ray, Hamadan, Mah Nahavand, and Azerbaijan, corresponding to the ancient region of Media. Fahlaviyat is an Arabicized form of the Persian word Pahlavi, which originally meant Parthian, but now came to mean "heroic, old, ancient." According to the historians Siavash Lornejad and Ali Doostzadeh, the Fahlaviyat used in Azerbaijan was called Old Azeri.

In some texts, Fahlaviyat has been called Awraman as well. This is because these poems were sung to melodies known as Awraman or ōrāmanān, which appears to be linked to the name of the Avroman region in Kurdistan.

Fahlaviyat, which was descended from Median dialects, had been substantially impacted by the Persian language, and also had linguistic similarities with the Parthian language. The oldest fahlaviyat quatrain was supposedly written in the dialect of Nahavand, by a certain Abu Abbas Nahavandi (died 942/43).

Evidence indicates that the Persian Sufis of Baghdad sang popular lyrical quatrains during their sama ceremonies in the 9th-century. The language that they sang in were likely not Arabic, but local Iranian dialects. Poets such as Homam Tabrizi (died 1314/15) and Abd al-Qadir Maraghi (died 1435) wrote in fahlaviyat.

== List of authors ==
The following are some authors whose works are recognized in the general genre of fahlaviyat:

- Awhadi Maraghai
- Ayn al-Quzat Hamadani
- Baba Tahir
- Safi-ad-din Ardabili
- Mama Esmat Tabrizi
- Maghrebi Tabrizi
- Humam-i Tabrizi
- Bundar Razi
- Safina-yi Tabriz

== Sources ==
- Lornejad, Siavash; Doostzadeh, Ali (2012). Arakelova, Victoria; Asatrian, Garnik (eds.). On the modern politicization of the Persian poet Nezami Ganjavi (PDF). Caucasian Centre for Iranian Studies. Archived from the original (PDF) on 2022-09-14.
- Paul, Ludwig (2000). "Persian Language i. Early New Persian". Encyclopædia Iranica, online edition. New York.
- Tafazzoli, Ahmad (1999). "Fahlavīyāt". In Yarshater, Ehsan (ed.). Encyclopædia Iranica. Vol. IX/2: Excavations IV–Fārābī V. Music. London and New York: Routledge & Kegan Paul. pp. 158–162. ISBN 978-0-933273-27-6.
