= Adam in rabbinic literature =

Allusions in rabbinic literature to the Biblical figure Adam, created according to the Book of Genesis by God in the Garden of Eden as the first man, expand and elaborate and draw inferences from what is presented in the text of the Bible itself.

== As representative of mankind ==
While the generic character that the name of Adam has in the older parts of Scripture, where it appears with the article ("the man"), was gradually lost sight of, his typical character as the representative of the unity of mankind was constantly emphasized:

Why was only a single specimen of man created first? To teach us that he who destroys a single soul destroys a whole world and that he who saves a single soul saves a whole world; furthermore, so no race or class may claim a nobler ancestry, saying, 'Our father was born first'; and, finally, to give testimony to the greatness of the Lord, who caused the wonderful diversity of mankind to emanate from one type. And why was Adam created last of all beings? To teach him humility; for if he be overbearing, let him remember that the little fly preceded him in the order of creation.

In a dispute, therefore, as to which Biblical verse expresses the fundamental principle of the Law, Simeon ben Azzai maintained — against Rabbi Akiva, who (following Hillel the Elder) had singled out the Golden Rule (Leviticus 19:18) — that the principle of love must have as its basis in Genesis 5:1, which teaches that all men are the offspring of him who was made in the image of God.

== Adam's creation ==
God took dust from the site of the Temple in Jerusalem and the four parts of the world, mingling it with the water of all the seas, and made him red, black, and white. Johanan bar Nappaha interprets Adam's name as being an acrostic of אפר, דם, מרה "ashes, blood, gall". Rabbi Meir has the tradition that God made Adam of the dust gathered from the whole world; and Abba Arikha says: "His head was made of earth from the Holy Land; his main body, from Babylonia; and the various members from different lands".

There are, however, two points of view regarding man's nature presented in the two Biblical stories of man's creation; and they are brought out more forcibly in the aggadah. "Both worlds, heaven and earth, were to have a share in man's creation; hence the host of angels were consulted by the Lord when He said, 'Let us make man'" His body reached from earth to heaven [or from one end of the world to the other] before sin caused him to sink". "He was of extreme beauty and sun-like brightness" "His skin was a bright garment, shining like his nails; when he sinned this brightness vanished, and he appeared naked". When God said: "Let us make man in our image," the angels in heaven, filled with jealousy, said: "What is man that Thou thinkest of him? A creature full of falsehood, hatred, and strife!" But Love pleaded in his favor; and the Lord spoke: "Let truth spring forth from the earth!"

A midrashic legend relates that the angels were so filled with wonder and awe at the sight of Adam, the image of God, that they wanted to pay homage to him and cry "Holy!" But the Lord caused sleep to fall upon him so that he lay like a corpse, and the Lord said: "Cease ye from man, whose breath is in his nostrils: for wherein is he to be accounted of?" (Isaiah 2:22). Another version is that all other creatures, marveling at Adam's greatness, prostrated themselves before him, taking him to be their creator; whereon he pointed upward to God, exclaiming: "The Lord reigneth, He is clothed with majesty!" (Psalms 93:1).

== The Fall ==
Adam in paradise had angels to wait upon and dance before him. He ate "angel's bread". All creation bowed before him in awe. He was the light of the world, but sin deprived him of all glory. The earth and the heavenly bodies lost their brightness, which will come back only in the Messianic time. Death came upon Adam and all creation. God's day being a thousand years, Adam was permitted to live 930 years, 70 years less than one thousand, so that the statement "in the day that thou eatest thereof, thou shalt surely die" might be fulfilled. The brutes no longer stood in awe of man as their ruler; instead, they attacked him. But while sin was of fatal consequence, and the effect of the poison of the serpent is still felt by all following generations, unless they should be released from it by the covenant of Sinai.

The deadly effect of sin can be removed by repentance. Hence, Adam is represented as a type of a penitent sinner. Thus, he is described as undergoing a terrible ordeal while fasting, praying, and bathing in the river for 47 days (seven weeks, Pirke de Rabbi Eliezer), or twice seven weeks—the shortening of the days after Tishri being taken by Adam as a sign of God's wrath, until after the winter solstice the days again grew longer, when he brought a sacrifice of thanksgiving. Another view is that when the sun rose the following morning he offered his thanksgiving, in which the angels joined him, singing the Sabbath Psalm (Psalms 92).

On account of the Sabbath the sun retained its brightness for the day; but as darkness set in Adam was seized with fear, thinking of his sin. Then the Lord taught him how to make fire by striking stones together. Thenceforth the fire is greeted with a blessing at the close of each Sabbath day.

When Adam heard the curse, "Thou shalt eat of the herbs of the earth," he staggered, saying: "O Lord, must I and my ass eat out of the same manger?" Then the voice of God came reassuringly: "With the sweat of thy brow shalt thou eat bread!" There is comfort in work. The angels taught Adam the work of agriculture, all the trades, and also how to work in iron. The invention of writing was ascribed to Adam.

The garments made by God for Adam were not of skin (עור), but of light (אור), and robes of glory were made of the serpent's skin.

== Adam in the Future World ==
Adam was the first to receive the promise of resurrection.

The Jewish view concerning Adam's sin is best expressed by Rabbi Ammi: "No man dies without a sin of his own. Accordingly, all the pious, being permitted to behold the Shekhinah before their death, reproach Adam (as they pass him by at the gate) for having brought death upon them; to which he replies: 'I died with but one sin, but you have committed many: on account of these you have died; not on my account'"

To Adam are ascribed Psalms 5, 19, 24, and 92.

An idea of the rabbis was that "Adam was created from the dust of the place where the sanctuary was to rise for the atonement of all human sin," so that sin should never be a permanent or inherent part of man's nature.

== See also ==
- Moses in rabbinic literature
