= Chinese Text Project =

Online open-access digital library

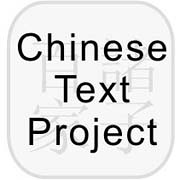
- Website type: Digital library
- Available in: English and Chinese
- Owner: Donald Sturgeon
- Creator: Donald Sturgeon
- Website: ctext.org
- Commercial: No
- Registration: required to contribute
- Launched: 2006
- Current status: active

Chinese Text Project
- Traditional Chinese: 中國哲學書電子化計劃
- Simplified Chinese: 中国哲学书电子化计划
- Literal meaning: The Chinese Philosophical Book Digitization Project
Transcriptions
Standard Mandarin
- Hanyu Pinyin: Zhōngguó zhéxué shū diànzǐhuà jìhuà

The Chinese Text Project (CTP; Chinese: 中國哲學書電子化計劃) is a digital library project that assembles collections of early Chinese texts. The name of the project in Chinese literally means "The Chinese Philosophical Book Digitization Project", showing its focus on books related to Chinese philosophy. It aims at providing accessible and accurate versions of a wide range of texts, particularly those relating to Chinese philosophy, and the site is credited with providing one of the most comprehensive and accurate collections of classical Chinese texts on the Internet.

== Site contents ==
Texts are divided into pre-Qin and Han texts, and post-Han texts, with the former categorized by school of thought and the latter by dynasty. The ancient (pre-Qin and Han) section of the database contains around 5.7 million Chinese characters, the post-Han database at over 20 million Chinese characters, and the "total wiki resources" consist of nearly 7.1 billion Chinese characters. Many texts also have English and Chinese translations, which are paired with the original text paragraph by paragraph as well as phrase by phrase for ease of comparison; this makes it possible for the system to be used as a useful scholarly research tool even by students with little or no knowledge of Chinese.

As well as providing customized search functionality suited to Chinese texts, the site also attempts to make use of the unique format of the web to offer a range of features relevant to sinologists, including an integrated dictionary, word lists, parallel passage information, scanned source texts, concordance and index data, a metadata system, Chinese commentary display, a published resources database, and a discussion forum in which threads can be linked to specific data on the site. The "Library" section of the site also includes scanned copies of over 36 million pages of early Chinese texts, linked line by line to transcriptions in the full-text database, many created using Optical Character Recognition, and edited and maintained using an online crowd-sourcing wiki system. Textual data and metadata can also be exported using an Application Programming Interface, allowing integration with other online tools as well as use in text mining and digital humanities projects.
