= Rami Tabrizi =

14th-century Persian rhetorician and poet

Sharaf al-Din Rami Tabrizi, best simply known as Rami Tabrizi, was a 14th-century Persian rhetorician and poet.
