= Abdurrazzaq Nasha Tabrizi =

Abdurrazzag Neshe Tabrizi
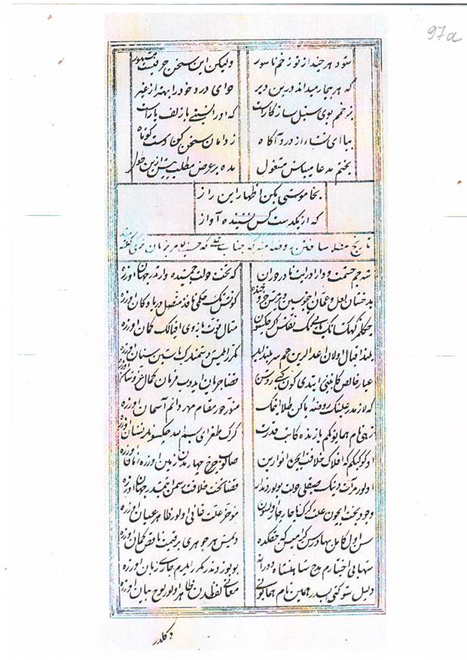
- A page from Nasha Tabrizi's dīvān
- Born: Azerbaijani:عبدالرزاق نشاء تبریزی; 17th century Tabriz, Azerbaijan province, Safavid Empire
- Died: 1774-1775; Tabriz, Tabriz Khanate
- Occupation: Poet
- Writing career
- Language: Azerbaijani and Persian

Abdurrazzag Nasha Tabrizi (Azerbaijani:عبدالرزاق نشاء تبریزی; b. Tabriz, Azerbaijan province, Safavid Empire – d. 1774–1775, Tabriz, Tabriz Khanate) was a poet who wrote poems in Azerbaijani Turkish and Persian.

== Life ==
Abdurrazzaq Nasha Tabrizi was born in the city of Tabriz at the end of the 17th century. He was descended from Jahan shah, one of the Qara Qoyunlu rulers. Like Jahan Shah, Nasha Tabrizi also wrote poems in Azerbaijani Turkish and Persian. In addition, Nasha Tabrizi, a soldier, participated in Nadir Shah Afshar's campaign in India. He became famous for the ghazals he wrote during the reign of Nadir Shah. Influenced by Saib Tabrizi, he also wrote poems in "Indian style". In 1741–1742, after Nadir Shah repaired the dome of Imam Ali's mausoleum, Nasha Tabrizi wrote a poem in Azerbaijani Turkish, and this poem was recorded on the main door of the mausoleum.

A manuscript copy of Tabrizi's dīvān is kept in the Topkapı Palace Museum. This copy was written in 1763. Dīvān has 3 qasida and 6 ghazals in Azerbaijani Turkish.

Although there are some opinions about the date of his death, according to Muhammad Ali Hosseini and Muhammad Amin Riyahi, Nasha Tabrizi died in Tabriz in 1775.

== Sources ==
- Paşa Kərimov (2020). XVIII əsr azərbaycan şairi Nəş'ə Təbrizi və onun türkdilli ədəbi irsi. Bakı.
- Paşa Kərimov (2023). Nəş'ə Təbrizi (PDF). Bakı.
- Tourkhan Gandjei (1977). The Turkish inscription of Kalat-i Nadiri. Wiener Zeitschrift für die Kunde des Morgenlandes, Vol. 69.
