= Muhammad ibn Muhammad Tabrizi =

Abu Abd Allah Muhammad ibn Abi Bakr ibn Muhammad Tabrizi was a thirteenth-century Persian Muslim writer, known for his Arabic commentary on the twenty five propositions at the beginning of Book II of the Jewish philosopher Maimonides's Guide for the Perplexed, on which Maimonides then based his proof of the existence, unity and incorporeality of God. The propositions, derived from Aristotle's Physics and Metaphysics, were merely summarised by Maimonides; Tabrizi gives a detailed discussion of them, based on the work of Arabic authors. It is the earliest known commentary on a part of the Guide.

Tabrizi's book was later translated into a strongly Arabicised Hebrew by Isaac ben Nathan of Cordoba. This translation formed the main basis of Hasdai Crescas's review in Or Adonai of the various demonstrations proposed for Maimonides's principles, prior to his embarking on a thorough critique of their inadequacies; it was also used by Moses ben Joshua of Narbonne. The translation was probably made in Majorca around 1347; it was printed in Ferrara in 1556. A second translation, into a more native idiomatic Hebrew, also exists in manuscript. (Paris, Bibliothèque Nationale, cod. héb., 974).

Tabrizi evidently thought highly of Maimonides. His book concludes "The author of these Propositions is the chief whose sceptre is "wisdom" and whose throne is "understanding," the Israelite prince, that has benefited his nation and all those who love God, etc. Moses ben Maimon ben Ebed-elohim, the Israelite... May God lead us to the truth. Amen!" A remark in the introduction to the commentary suggests that Tabrizi intended to prepare a commentary on the whole Guide. However, some suggest that he may not have had access to the Guide in its entirety: comments about Maimonides's view of the human soul are badly flawed.

== See also ==
- List of Iranian scientists and scholars
