= Safina-yi Tabriz =

14th-century manuscript from Iran

Safīna-yi Tabrīz (Persian: سفینهٔ تبریز, romanized: Safīna-yi Tabrēz, lit. '[the] vessel/treasure of Tabriz') is an important encyclopedic manuscript from 14th century Ilkhanid Iran compiled by Abu'l Majd Muhammad ibn Mas'ud Tabrizi between 1321 and 1323.

Safina (Persian: سفینه, Arabic: سفينة, Urdu: سفینہ, romanized: safīna, Hindi: सफ़ीना, romanized: safīnā) is an Arabic word meaning "vessel". In term of manuscripts, it denotes a special form of a book whose cover is elongated. Thus when the book is opened, it resembles a long vessel. In Persian use, safina is a synonym for jung (جُنگ) which means a collection of essays or poems.

== Discovery and scope ==
Based on the manuscript, the book has been published in facsimile by Tehran University Press. As it constitutes a rare Islamic manuscript that has recently been discovered, it has generated a great deal of interest among Islamic, Iranian and Middle Eastern scholars. It is almost perfectly preserved, and contains 209 works on a wide range of subjects, in Persian and Arabic as well as some poetry denoted by Fahlavīyāt and the Iranian language of Tabriz. According to Professors A. A. Seyed-Gohrab and S. McGlinn, The Safineh: is indeed a whole treasure-house, compressed between two covers. One of the important features of the Safinah is that it contains works of a number of philosophers who were not known until the discovery of the manuscript.

The texts of the Safina-yi Tabrizi contain separate chapters covering hadeeth(traditions of the prophet of Islam), lexicography, ethics, mysticism, jurisprudence, theology, exegesis, history, grammar, linguistics, literature literary criticism, philosophy, astronomy astrology, geomancy, mineralogy, mathematics, medicine, music, physiognomy, cosmography and geography. According to Professors A.A. Seyed-Gohrab and S. McGlinn, some of the best available texts of important works of Islamic culture and learning are contained in this work.

Several recent conferences have been held in Iran as well as the West discussing the different aspects of this book. The two most important conferences with this regard were held in the university of Leiden and the University of Tabriz in Iran. The conference held in the city of Tabriz where the work was composed was designated with the theme: Tabriz in the mirror of The treasury of Tabriz.

According to Professor Seyyed Ali Al-e Davud: The picture one gets from the 7th and 8th century Islamic era from the Safina Tabriz is a complete picture of the cultural, scientific and social settings of that time. One of many aspects of this manuscript deals with Islamic philosophy. In his recent book Professor Seyyed Hossein Nasr has described the manuscript as an earth shaking discovery. Nasr provides a brief overview of the philosophical treatise of the Safina.

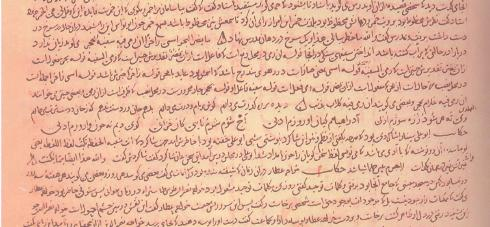
A Page from the Safina containing a modern Persian and a Fahlavi (regional Iranian dialect poem)

== Overview of some of the articles ==
The compendium constitutes about 209 eclectic articles spanning numerous subjects and topics. All the articles are written in Persian and Arabic although Fahlavīyāt poetry and sayings are seen in some of the articles.

Articles 77, 79 and 80 are in Arabic and from Avicenna. They touch upon the question of destiny vs free will among other philosophical topics. The questioner is the famous Persian poet Abu Sa'id Abu'l-Khayr.

Article 84, in Persian, is a philosophical work of Nasir al-Din al-Tusi titled: "Aghaaz o Anjaam" (The beginning and the end).

Article 90, also in Persian, deals with how to find the moon in the current Zodiac without using a calendar. This article is taken from Nasir al-Din Tusi.

Article 92 contains tables of the position of stars and astronomical calculations.

Article 97 deals with mathematics. It contains three sections and each section is composed of two subsections.

Article 99 also in Persian deals with medicine and the benefits and harm of various fruits, plants and breads.

Articles 112 and 113 list the date of birth of Prophets, Caliphs, important scholars, pre-Islamic kings of Persia as well as post-Islamic kings, and the birth of important philosophers like those of Aristotle and Jamasp, the companion of Zoroaster. Relative to his own time, the author places Adam at 6700 years before and Noah at 4900 years before.

Article 114 (in Persian) is about the history of Tabriz. It mentions the building of Tabriz in the hands of Wahsudan, the Rawadid ruler.

Article 134 contains the dictionary Lughat-i Fors (lexicon of the Persian language) of Asadi Tusi.

Articles 138 and 139 (in Persian) deal with the moral and philosophical topics presented by the Sassanid Vizier Bozorgmehr.

Article 145, which is composed of three sections, is about music and is written by Ajab ol-Zaman Mohammad ibn Mahmud Nishapuri.

Article 163 in Persian deals with the health benefits of perfumes and good smelling medicine.

Article 165 in Persian is titled: "The reason for snow and rain" and has 20 sections.

Article 166, in Persian, is about geography and deals with the regions and cities of the world.

Article 196, in Persian, is about knowledge and logic.

Article 205 titled: "A short report on the Bani Umayyad" is in Arabic and gives a brief history of the Umayyad dynasty from Muawiyah all the way to the last Umayyads of Spain.

== Linguistic importance ==
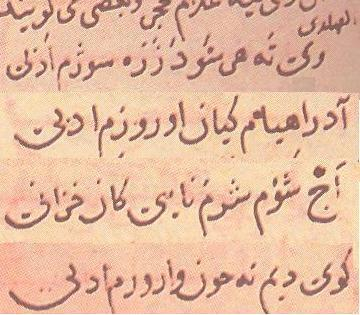
A sample Fahlavi (regional Iranian dialect poem

Besides standard Arabic and Persian, the texts contains many every day expressions of the ancient Iranian language of Tabriz during the Ilkhanid era also termed as Fahlaviyat deriving from the word Pahlavi. As it is evident in chapter 124, page 533, in that time the language of Tabriz was not Turkish and the common language in Tabriz was Pahlavi (or ancient Azari).

A sample expression of Fahlaviyat from the mystic Baba Faraj Tabrizi in the Safina:

انانک قده‌ي فرجشون فعالم آندره اووارادا چاشمش نه پيف قدم کينستا نه پيف حدوث

Standard Persian:

چندانک فرج را در عالم آورده‌اند چشم او نه بر قدم افتاده‌است نه بر حدوث

The Safina (written in the Ilkhanid era) contains many poems and sentences from the old regional dialect of Azerbaijan. Another portion of the Safina contains a direct sentence in what the native Tabrizi author has explicitly called as "Zaban-i-Tabriz" (language of Tabriz):

دَچَان چوچرخ نکویت مو ایر رهشه مهر دورش

چَو ِش دَ کارده شکویت ولَول ودَارد سَر ِ یَوه

پَری بقهر اره میر دون جو پور زون هنرمند

پروکری اَنزوتون منی که آن هزیوه

اکیژ بحتَ ورامرو کی چرخ هانزمَویتی

ژژور منشی چو بخت اهون قدریوه

نه چرخ استه نبوتی نه روزو ورو فوتی

زو ِم چو واش خللیوه زمم حو بورضی ربوه

== Debates of inanimate objects ==
Interesting debates between various objects constitute some of the articles of the Safina. In each of these debates, each object boasts of its own quality relative to its opponent while attempting to belittle their opponents. Through these abstractions of inanimate objects, the authors use both poetry and composition to convey moral and philosophical lessons. The following listed articles all in Persian are the debates between the inanimate objects.

Article 45: The debate between the Rose and Wine (Monaazereyeh Gol o Mol / مناظرهء گُل و مُل) by Abu Sa'id Tirmidhi

Article 46: The debate between the Cypress tree and Water (Monaazereyeh Sarv o aab / مناظرهء سرو و آب) by Qadi Nezam al-din Esfahani

Article 47: The debate between the wine and hashish (Monaazereyeh Sharab o Hashish / مناظرهء شراب و حشیش) by Sa'ad al-Din ibn Baha al-din

Article 48: Another debate between the wine and hashish (Monaazereyeh Sharab o Hashish / مناظرهء شراب و حشیش) by an unknown author

Article 49: The debate between the sword and the pen (Monaazereyeh Shamshir o Qalam / مناظرهء شمشیر و قلم) by an unknown author

Article 50: The debate between the earth and sky (Monaazereyeh Zamin o Asemaan / مناظرهء زمین و آسمان) by unknown author

Article 51: The debate between the fire and the earth (Monaazereyeh Al-Naar va Al-Toraab / مناظرهء النار و التراب) by Amin Al-Din Abul Qasim Al-Haji Bolah

Article 52: The debate between the sight and hearing (Monaazereyeh Al-Sama' va Al-Basar / مناظرهء السمع و البصر) by the compiler of the Safina, Abu'l Majd Muhammad bin Mas'ud Tabrizi

Article 53: The debate between poetry and prose (Monaazereyeh Nazm o Nasr / مناظرهء نظم و نثر) by Abu'l Majd Muhammad bin Mas'ud Tabrizi

== Sources and references ==
In the book "Seyed-Gohrab, A. A. & S. McGlinn, A Treasury from Tabriz: the Great Il-Khanid Compendium. (Amsterdam: Rozenberg Publishers)" to be published in February 2007, the following English articles touch on the various aspects of the Safina:

- Abdullaeva, F.I., (University of Saint-Petersburg, University of Oxford) “What is safina”
- Afshar, I., (University of Tehran) “Codicological characteristics and geographical contents of the Safina-yi Tabriz”
- Al-e Davud, S.A., (Tehran University) “A Review of the Treatises and Historical Documents in Safina-ye Tabriz”
- Ali Asghar Sadeqi, "Some poems in the Karaji, Tabrizi and others" in Zaban-Shenasi, Year 15, No. 2 (Fall and Winder), 1379 (2001).
- Melville, Ch., (University of Cambridge) “Qadi Baidawi’s Nizam al-tawarikh in the Safina-yi Tabriz: An early witness of the text”
- Mottalebi Kashani, N., (Library of the Islamic Consultative Assembly) “Newly Discovered Testament of Khvja Shams al-Din Mohammad Jovaini, Saheb Divan in Safina-ye-Tabriz”
- Pourjavady, N., (University of Tehran) “Fabulous debates (munazaras) in the Safine and their historical significance”
- Radtke, B., (University of Utrecht) “Mystical Treatises in Safina of Tabriz”
- Seyed-Gohrab, A.A., (Leiden University) “Introductory notes on the Safina”
- Sharma, S., (University of Boston) “Wandering Quatrains and Women Poets in the Khulasat al-asharr fi al-rubayat”
- Tourkin, S., (Institute of Oriental Studies, St. Petersburg) “Astronomical and astrological works in the 'Safine-ye Tabriz'”
- Van den Berg, G.R., (Leiden University) “Wisdom literature in the Safina”
- Vesel, Z., (CNRS, Monde Iranien) “Scientific Resala’s in Safina-ye Tabriz: indicators of author's culture and elements for discussing the nature/genre of this compilation”
- Zutphen, M., (Independent scholar) “The science of Physiognomy in the Safina”
