= New Persian =

Final-stage classification of the Persian language

- Modern Persian
- فارسی نو, فارسی نوین
- Fārsi written in Persian calligraphy (Nastaʿlīq)
- Native to: Iran (as Western Persian); Afghanistan (as Dari); Tajikistan (as Tajik); Uzbekistan (as Tajik); Iraq; Turkmenistan (as Tajik); Russia; Azerbaijan
- Native speakers: 70 million (110 million total speakers)
- Language family: Indo-European: Indo-Iranian; Iranian; Western Iranian; Southwestern Iranian; Persian; New Persian
- Early forms: Old Persian: Middle Persian
- Writing system: Persian alphabet (Iran and Afghanistan); Tajik alphabet (Tajikistan); Hebrew alphabet Persian Braille

Official status
- Official language in: Iran (as Farsi); Afghanistan (as Dari); Tajikistan (as Tajik); Dagestan (as Tat)
- Regulated by: Academy of Persian Language and Literature (Iran); Academy of Sciences of Afghanistan (Afghanistan); Rudaki Institute of Language and Literature (Tajikistan)

Language codes
- ISO 639-1: fa
- ISO 639-2: per (B) fas (T)
- ISO 639-3: fas
- Glottolog: fars1254
- Linguasphere: 58-AAC (Wider Persian) > 58-AAC-c (Central Persian)
- Areas with significant numbers of people whose first language is Persian (including dialects)

- Persian Linguasphere. Legend Official language More than 1,000,000 speakers Between 500,000 – 1,000,000 speakers Between 100,000 – 500,000 speakers Between 25,000 – 100,000 speakers Fewer than 25,000 speakers / none

New Persian (Persian: فارسی نو), also known as Modern Persian (Persian: فارسی نوین), is the current stage of the Persian language spoken since the 8th to 9th centuries until now in Greater Iran and surroundings. It is conventionally divided into three stages: Early New Persian (8th/9th centuries), Classical Persian (10th–18th centuries), and Contemporary Persian (19th century to present).

Dari is a name given to the New Persian language since the 10th century, widely used in Arabic (see Istakhri, al-Maqdisi and ibn Hawqal) and Persian texts. Since 1964, Dari has been the official name in Afghanistan for the Persian spoken there.

New Persian developed in the eastern Iranian world (Khorasan, Transoxiana, and modern-day Afghanistan/Central Asia) following the Sassanian retreat to Transoxiana after the Arab conquest. It was standardized under eastern empires like the Saffarid, Samanid, and Ghaznavid empires, with early poets such as Hanzala Badghisi and Rudaki writing exclusively in Persian in Khorasan and Transoxiana.

Modern-Iran at that time did not speak New Persian. It was linguistically diverse with Middle Persian, regional Iranian languages, and Arabic being the primary languages — only later (10th–11th centuries) did New Persian spread west into modern-Iran and become dominant.

== Classification ==
New Persian is a member of the Western Iranian group of the Iranian languages, which make up a branch of the Indo-European languages in their Indo-Iranian subdivision.

Indo-Iranian (Aryan)
Proto Indo-Iranian
Indo-Aryan	Proto-Iranian	Nuristani
Iranian Languages (Irani-Aryan)
Old Iranian	Middle Iranian	New Iranian (Neo-Iranian)
Old Persian	Western	Eastern
Southwestern	Northwestern	Soghdian, Scythian, Khwarezmian, Bactrian
Middle Persian (Pārsīg/Sassanian Pahlavi)	Median (Medic), Parthian (Pahlavani/Arsacid Pahlavi)	Kurdish, Old Azeri, Tati, Balochi, Talyshi, Zaza, Mazanderani, Gilaki
Achomi (Larestani)	Luri	New Persian (Farsi/Parsi)
Iranian Farsi/Parsi (Western)	Tajiki Farsi/Parsi (Eastern)	Dari Farsi/Parsi (Eastern)
Tehrani, Isfahani, etc.

The Western Iranian languages themselves are divided into two subgroups: Southwestern Iranian languages, of which Persian is the most widely spoken, and Northwestern Iranian languages, of which Kurdish is the most widely spoken.

== Etymology ==
"New Persian" is the name given to the final stage of development of Persian language. The term Persian is an English derivation of Latin Persiānus, the adjectival form of Persia, itself deriving from Greek Persís (Περσίς), a Hellenized form of Old Persian Pārsa (𐎱𐎠𐎼𐎿), which means "Persia" (a region in southwestern Iran corresponding to modern-day Fars province). According to the Oxford English Dictionary, the term Persian as a language name is first attested in English in the mid-16th century.

There are different opinions about the origin of the word Dari. The majority of scholars believes Dari refers to the Persian word dar (در) or darbār "court" (دربار) as it was the formal language of the Sasanian dynasty. The original meaning of the word dari is given in a notice attributed to Ibn al-Muqaffaʿ (cited by Ibn al-Nadim in Al-Fehrest). According to him, "Pārsī was the language spoken by priests, scholars, and the like; it is the language of Fars." This language refers to the Middle Persian. As for Dari, he says, "it is the language of the cities of Madā'en; it is spoken by those who are at the king's court. [Its name] is connected with presence at court. Among the languages of the people of Khorasan and the east, the language of the people of Balkh is predominant."

== History ==
New Persian is conventionally divided into three stages:

- Early New Persian (8th/9th centuries)
- Classical Persian (10th–18th centuries)
- Contemporary Persian (19th century to present)

Early New Persian remains largely intelligible to speakers of Contemporary Persian, as the morphology and, to a lesser extent, the lexicon of the language have remained relatively stable.

=== Early New Persian ===
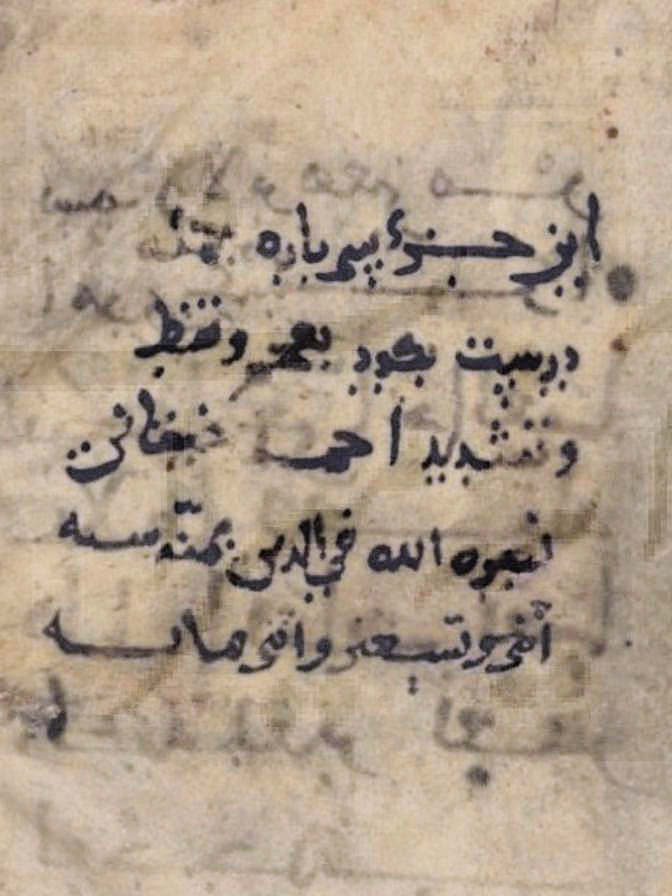
Persian notes on Quranic booklets, written by a native of Tus called Ahmad Khayqani in 292 AH (905 CE)

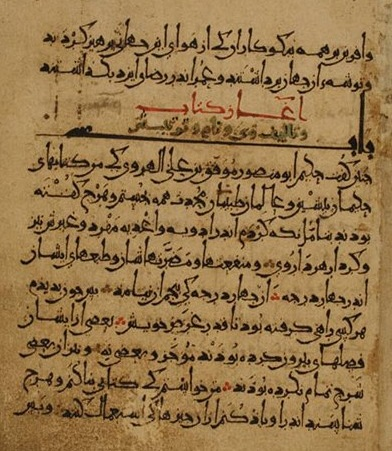
A page from a manuscript of "Kitab al-Abniya 'an Haqa'iq al-Adwiya" by Abu Mansur Muwaffaq, copied by Asadi Tusi in 447 AH (1055 CE)

New Persian texts written in the Arabic script first appear in the 9th-century. The language is a direct descendant of Middle Persian, the official, religious and literary language of the Sasanian Empire (224–651). However, it is not descended from the literary form of Middle Persian (known as pārsīk, commonly called Pahlavi), which was spoken by the people of Fars and used in Zoroastrian religious writings. Instead, it is descended from the dialect spoken by the court of the Sasanian capital Ctesiphon and the northeastern Iranian region of Khorasan, known as Dari. Khorasan, which was the homeland of the Parthians, was Persianized under the Sasanians. Dari Persian thus supplanted the Parthian language, which by the end of the Sasanian era had fallen out of use. New Persian has incorporated many foreign words, including from eastern northern and northern Iranian languages such as Sogdian and especially Parthian.

The mastery of the newer speech having now been transformed from Middle into New Persian was already complete by the era of the three princely dynasties of Iranian origin, the Tahirid dynasty (820–872), Saffarid dynasty (860–903) and Samanid Empire (874–999), and could develop only in range and power of expression. Abbas of Merv is mentioned as being the earliest minstrel to chant verse in the newer Persian tongue and after him the poems of Hanzala Badghisi were among the most famous between the Persian-speakers of the time.

The first poems of the Persian language, a language historically called Dari, emerged in Afghanistan. The first significant Persian poet was Rudaki. He flourished in the 10th century, when the Samanids were at the height of their power. His reputation as a court poet and as an accomplished musician and singer has survived, although little of his poetry has been preserved. Among his lost works are versified fables collected in the Kalila wa Dimna.

The language spread geographically from the 11th century on and was the medium through which among others, Central Asian Turks became familiar with Islam and urban culture. New Persian was widely used as a trans-regional lingua franca, a task for which it was particularly suitable due to its relatively simple morphological structure and this situation persisted until at least the 19th century. In the late Middle Ages, new Islamic literary languages were created on the Persian model: Ottoman Turkish, Chagatai, Dobhashi and Urdu, which are regarded as "structural daughter languages" of Persian.

=== Classical Persian ===
"Classical Persian" loosely refers to the standardized language of medieval Persia used in literature and poetry. This is the language of the 10th to 12th centuries, which continued to be used as literary language and lingua franca under the "Persianized" Turko-Mongol dynasties during the 12th to 15th centuries, and under restored Persian rule during the 16th to 19th centuries.

Persian during this time served as lingua franca of Greater Persia and of much of the Indian subcontinent. It was also the official and cultural language of many Islamic dynasties, including the Samanids, Buyids, Tahirids, Ziyarids, the Mughal Empire, Timurids, Ghaznavids, Karakhanids, Seljuqs, Khwarazmians, the Sultanate of Rum, Delhi Sultanate, the Shirvanshahs, Safavids, Afsharids, Zands, Qajars, Khanate of Bukhara, Khanate of Kokand, Emirate of Bukhara, Khanate of Khiva, Ottomans and also many Mughal successors such as the Nizam of Hyderabad. Persian was the only non-European language known and used by Marco Polo at the Court of Kublai Khan and in his journeys through China.

=== Contemporary Persian ===
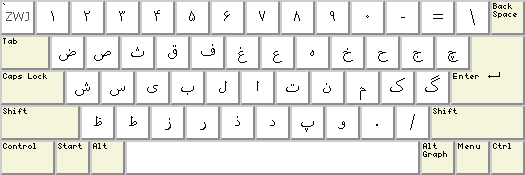
A variant of the Iranian standard ISIRI 9147 keyboard layout for Persian

Qajar dynasty

In the 19th century, under the Qajar dynasty, the dialect that is spoken in Tehran rose to prominence. There was still substantial Arabic vocabulary, but many of these words have been integrated into Persian phonology and grammar. In addition, under the Qajar rule numerous Russian, French, and English terms entered the Persian language, especially vocabulary related to technology.

The first official attentions to the necessity of protecting the Persian language against foreign words, and to the standardization of Persian orthography, were under the reign of Naser ed Din Shah of the Qajar dynasty in 1871. After Naser ed Din Shah, Mozaffar ed Din Shah ordered the establishment of the first Persian association in 1903. This association officially declared that it used Persian and Arabic as acceptable sources for coining words. The ultimate goal was to prevent books from being printed with wrong use of words. According to the executive guarantee of this association, the government was responsible for wrongfully printed books. Words coined by this association, such as rāh-āhan (راه‌آهن) for "railway", were printed in Soltani Newspaper; but the association was eventually closed due to inattention.

A scientific association was founded in 1911, resulting in a dictionary called Words of Scientific Association (لغت انجمن علمی), which was completed in the future and renamed Katouzian Dictionary (فرهنگ کاتوزیان).

Pahlavi dynasty

The first academy for the Persian language was founded on 20 May 1935, under the name Academy of Iran. It was established by the initiative of Reza Shah Pahlavi, and mainly by Hekmat e Shirazi and Mohammad Ali Foroughi, all prominent names in the nationalist movement of the time. The academy was a key institution in the struggle to re-build Iran as a nation-state after the collapse of the Qajar dynasty. During the 1930s and 1940s, the academy led massive campaigns to replace the many Arabic, Russian, French, and Greek loanwords whose widespread use in Persian during the centuries preceding the foundation of the Pahlavi dynasty had created a literary language considerably different from the spoken Persian of the time. This became the basis of what is now known as "Contemporary Standard Persian".

== Varieties ==
There are three standard varieties of modern Persian:

- Iranian Persian (Western Persian, or Farsi) is spoken in Iran, and by minorities in Iraq and the Persian Gulf states.
- Eastern Persian is as follows:
  - Dari (Dari Persian or Afghan Persian) is spoken in Afghanistan.
  - Tajiki (Tajik Persian) is spoken in Tajikistan and Uzbekistan. It is written in the Cyrillic script.

All three varieties are based on the classic Persian literature and its literary tradition. There are also several local dialects from Iran, Afghanistan and Tajikistan which slightly differ from the standard Persian. The Hazaragi (in Afghanistan), Aimaqi (in western Afghanistan), Darwazi (in northern Afghanistan and southern Tajikistan), Basseri (in southern Iran), Sistani (in Sistan of Southwestern Afghanistan and eastern Iran), Dehwari (in Balochistan of Pakistan), and the Tehrani dialects (in Iran, the basis of standard Iranian Persian) are examples of these dialects. Persian-speaking peoples of Iran, Afghanistan, and Tajikistan can understand one another with a relatively high degree of mutual intelligibility. Nevertheless, the Encyclopædia Iranica notes that the Iranian, Afghan, and Tajiki varieties comprise distinct branches of the Persian language, and within each branch a wide variety of local dialects exist.

The following are some languages closely related to Persian, or in some cases are considered dialects:

- Luri (or Lori), spoken mainly in the southwestern Iranian provinces of Lorestan, Kohgiluyeh and Boyer-Ahmad, Chaharmahal and Bakhtiari some western parts of Fars province, and some parts of Khuzestan province.
- Achomi (or Lari), spoken mainly in southern Iranian provinces of Fars and Hormozgan, unlike New Persian and its variants such as Dari, Standard Persian, and Iranian Persian, this is a branch of Middle Persian.
- Tat, spoken in parts of Azerbaijan, Russia, and Transcaucasia. It is classified as a variety of Persian. (This dialect is not to be confused with the Tati language of northwestern Iran, which is a member of a different branch of the Iranian languages.)
- Judeo-Tat. Part of the Tat-Persian continuum, spoken in Azerbaijan, Russia, as well as by immigrant communities in Israel and New York.

=== Standard Persian ===
Standard Persian is the standard variety of Persian that is the official language of the Iran and Tajikistan and one of the two official languages of Afghanistan. It is a set of spoken and written formal varieties used by the educated persophones of several nations around the world.

As Persian is a pluricentric language, Standard Persian encompasses various linguistic norms (consisting of prescribed usage). Standard Persian practically has three standard varieties with official status in Iran, Afghanistan, and Tajikistan. The standard forms of the three are based on the Tehrani, Kabuli, and Bukharan varieties, respectively.

== See also ==
- History of the Persian language

== Sources ==
- Bosworth, C.E. & Crowe, Yolande (1995). "Sāmānids". In Bosworth, C. E.; van Donzel, E.; Heinrichs, W. P. & Lecomte, G. (eds.). The Encyclopaedia of Islam, Second Edition. Volume VIII: Ned–Sam. Leiden: E. J. Brill. ISBN 978-90-04-09834-3.
- Bosworth, C. E. (1998). "Esmāʿīl, b. Aḥmad b. Asad Sāmānī, Abū Ebrāhīm". In Yarshater, Ehsan (ed.). Encyclopædia Iranica. Vol. VIII/6: Eršād al-zerāʿa–Eʿteżād-al-Salṭana. London and New York: Routledge & Kegan Paul. pp. 636–637. ISBN 978-1-56859-055-4.
- Crone, Patricia (2012). The Nativist Prophets of Early Islamic Iran: Rural Revolt and Local Zoroastrianism. Cambridge University Press. ISBN 978-1107642386.
- de Blois, Francois (2004). Persian Literature – A Bio-Bibliographical Survey: Poetry of the Pre-Mongol Period (Volume V). Routledge. ISBN 978-0947593476.
- de Bruijn, J.T.P. (1978). "Iran, vii.—Literature". In van Donzel, E.; Lewis, B.; Pellat, Ch. & Bosworth, C. E. (eds.). The Encyclopaedia of Islam, Second Edition. Volume IV: Iran–Kha. Leiden: E. J. Brill. pp. 52–75. ISBN 978-90-04-05745-6. OCLC 758278456.
- Frye, R. N. (2004). "Iran v. Peoples of Iran (1) A General Survey". In Yarshater, Ehsan (ed.). Encyclopædia Iranica. Vol. XIII/3: Iran II. Iranian history–Iran V. Peoples of Iran. London and New York: Routledge & Kegan Paul. pp. 321–326. ISBN 978-0-933273-89-4.
- Jeremiás, Éva (2011). "Iran". In Edzard, Lutz; de Jong, Rudolf (eds.). Encyclopedia of Arabic Language and Linguistics. Brill Online.
- Lazard, G. (1975). "The Rise of the New Persian Language". In Frye, Richard N. (ed.). The Cambridge History of Iran: From the Arab Invasion to the Saljuqs. Vol. 4. Cambridge: Cambridge University Press. pp. 595–633. ISBN 0-521-20093-8.
- Lazard, G. (1994). "Darī". In Yarshater, Ehsan (ed.). Encyclopædia Iranica. Vol. VII/1: Dārā(b)–Dastūr al-Afāżel. London and New York: Routledge & Kegan Paul. pp. 34–35. ISBN 978-1-56859-019-6.
- Paul, Ludwig (2000). "Persian Language i. Early New Persian". Encyclopædia Iranica, online edition. New York.
- Perry, John R. (2011). "Persian". In Edzard, Lutz; de Jong, Rudolf (eds.). Encyclopedia of Arabic Language and Linguistics. Brill Online.
- Spuler, Bertold (2003). Persian Historiography and Geography: Bertold Spuler on Major Works Produced in Iran, the Caucasus, Central Asia, India, and Early Ottoman Turkey. Pustaka Nasional Pte Ltd. ISBN 978-9971-77-488-2.
- Rypka, Jan (1968). Jahn, Karl (ed.). History of Iranian Literature. doi:10.1007/978-94-010-3479-1. ISBN 978-94-010-3481-4.
