= Standard Persian =

Standard forms of Persian official in Iran, Afghanistan and Tajikistan

- فارسی معیار
- Native to: Iran; Afghanistan; Tajikistan; Uzbekistan; Iraq
- Native speakers: 70 million (110 million total speakers)
- Language family: Indo-European: Indo-Iranian; Iranian; Western Iranian; Southwestern Iranian; Persian; Standard Persian
- Standard forms: Iranian Persian; Dari Persian; Tajik Persian
- Writing system: Persian alphabet (Iran and Afghanistan); Tajik alphabet (Tajikistan and Uzbekistan)

Official status
- Official language in: Iran (as Persian); Afghanistan (as Dari); Tajikistan (as Tajik)
- Regulated by: Academy of Persian Language and Literature (Iran); Academy of Sciences of Afghanistan (Afghanistan); Rudaki Institute of Language and Literature (Tajikistan)

Language codes
- ISO 639-1: fa
- ISO 639-2: per (B) fas (T)
- ISO 639-3: fas
- Glottolog: fars1254
- Linguasphere: 58-AAC (Wider Persian) > 58-AAC-c (Central Persian)
- Areas with significant numbers of people whose first language is Persian (including dialects)

Standard Persian (Persian: فارسی معیار) is the standard variety of Persian that is the official language of Iran and Tajikistan and one of the two official languages of Afghanistan. It is a set of spoken and written formal varieties used by the educated persophones of several nations around the world.

As Persian is a pluricentric language, Standard Persian encompasses various linguistic norms (consisting of prescribed usage). Standard Persian practically has three standard varieties with official status in Iran, Afghanistan, and Tajikistan. The standard forms of the three are based on the Tehrani, Kabuli, and Bukharan varieties, respectively.

== Written standards ==
The Persian alphabet is used for both Persian (Iranian) and Dari (Afghan). Traditionally, Tajiki is also written with Perso-Arabic script. In order to increase literacy, a Latin alphabet (based on the Common Turkic Alphabet) was introduced in 1917. Later in the late 1930s, the Tajik Soviet Socialist Republic promoted the use of Cyrillic alphabet, which remains the most widely used system today. Attempts to reintroduce the Perso-Arabic script were made.

== See also ==
- History of the Persian language
- Standard language
