= Achomi language =

Iranian language spoken in the south of Iran

Larestani
- Lari, Achomi, Khodmuni
- لاری، آچُمی، خودمونی
- Native to: Iran; United Arab Emirates; Bahrain; Kuwait; Oman; Qatar; Saudi Arabia
- Region: Irahistan (Parts of Fars, Hormozgan, Bushehr, Kerman)
- Ethnicity: Achum (Ajam)
- Native speakers: 120,000 (2021)
- Language family: Indo-European: Indo-Iranian; Iranian; Western; Southwestern; Old Persian; Middle Persian; Larestani
- Early form: Middle Persian (Pahlavi)
- Dialects: Lari; Bastaki; Evazi; Khonji; Gerashi; Galedari; Eshkanani; Lengeyi; Ashnezi; Ruydari; Aheli; Bandari (Bander Abbas)
- Writing system: Persian alphabet

Language codes
- ISO 639-3: lrl
- Glottolog: lari1253
- ELP: Lari
- Achomi is classified as Definitely Endangered by the UNESCO Atlas of the World's Languages in Danger

Achomi (fa: آچمی), also known as Lari (fa: لاری), Larestani (fa: لارستانی) and Khodmuni (fa: خودمونی), is a Southwestern Iranian language spoken by the Laris or Achom people in southern Fars and western Hormozgan and by significant numbers of Ajam citizens in the UAE, Bahrain, Kuwait, and other neighbouring countries. It is a descendant of middle Persian.

It is the predominant language of Lar, Gerash, Evaz, Khonj, and counties in Fars and Bastak County and Ruydar in Hormozgan province, i. e. Laristan region.

Moreover, many cities, towns, and villages in Iran have their own particular dialect, such as Lar, Khonj, Gerash, Evaz, Eshkanan, Bastak, Banaruiyeh and others in Larestan. The majority of Lari speakers are Sunni Muslims, with a minority being Shia Muslims.

The Achomi language is considered a descendant of the Sassanid Persian language or Middle Persian.

== Etymology and name of the language ==
There are different ways to refer to this language.

- Achomi: Native speakers often refer to their language as "ačomī", related to achom, which means "I go" in the language. Other explanations for this name are the language's frequent usage of the [tʃ] consonant, and that Arabs, with whom these people traded, called them 'Ajam', which means non-Arab (and particularly Persians).
- Lari: This language is also called Lari. To reiterate, 'Lar' originates from 'Lad' which means "the origin of everything". It is also important to note that Lari can be used to refer to a dialect or a language.
- Larestani: Sometimes, this term is used to distinguish the Lari language from the Lari dialect. Actually Larestan or Laristan refers to Lar (capital and center of the region) and its surrounding areas.
- Khodmuni: In GCC states surrounding the Persian Gulf, Achomis are referred to as Khodmuni'. This translates to "of native kind".

== History ==
Achomi language and its various local dialects such as Lari, Evazi, Khonji, Gerashi, Bastaki, etc... and is a branch of the Middle Persian (Pahlavi) language of the Sassanid Empire.

Today, the language is known as an endangered language. In particular, UNESCO refers to it as a "definitely endangered" language with approximately 1,180,000 speakers. It also does not have official language status in Iran. This is because Iran only recognizes standard Persian as an official language. However, Iran allows the use of minority languages, such as Achomi, in the media and the education system (alongside Persian). Nevertheless, Achomi remains an endangered language with many dialectal differences gradually disappearing because of the domination of Iranian Tehrani New Persian (Farsi).

Many Iranians moved to GCC States in order to pursue better economic opportunities. This included Achomis. These Achomis are often multilingual. Achomi migrants still speak this language in their homes, however, this variety has been influenced by the Arabic language a little but is mutually intelligible with standard Persian.

== Classification ==
The language is a branch of the Pahlavi Parsig language. This means that it shares the ergative structure of Pahlavi. It is also an analytical language. This can be linked back to its membership in the southwestern branch of Middle-Iranian languages.

Indo-Iranian (Aryan)
Proto Indo-Iranian
Indo-Aryan	Proto-Iranian	Nuristani
Iranian Languages (Irani-Aryan)
Old Iranian	Middle Iranian	New Iranian (Neo-Iranian)
Old Persian	Western	Eastern
Southwestern	Northwestern	Soghdian, Scythian, Khwarezmian, Bactrian
Middle Persian (Pārsīg/Sassanian Pahlavi)	Median (Medic), Parthian (Pahlavani/Arsacid Pahlavi)	Kurdish, Old Azeri, Tati, Balochi, Talyshi, Zaza, Mazanderani, Gilaki
Larestani (Achomi)	Luri	New Persian (Farsi)
Iranian Farsi (Western)	Tajiki Farsi	Dari Farsi (Eastern)
Tehrani, Isfahani, Etc...

Except for the regional accent, pronunciation of certain words, and a slight variation in grammar, this old language has been the common language of the Southwestern Pars Province and parts of Hormozgan province for nearly 1,800 years despite the various conquests of the region since the fall of the Sassanid Empire.

== Dialects ==
Achomi has many dialects. These dialects correspond to Larestan's different towns. Examples of these dialects include Lari, Evazi, Gerashi, Khonji and Bastaki. These dialectical variations may present themselves through pronunciation. There may also be grammatical and word differences between the dialects. Hence, if the speaker is from Evaz, they are referred as speaking Evazi, and if they are from Bastak their dialect is known as Bastaki.

An example of a dialectal variation: in some particular regions, Achomi people say raftom for "I went" (very similar to the Persian raftam), but in some other regions, just as Lar people, they say chedem (Kurdish: dichim or dechim) instead.

== Samples ==
=== Vocabulary ===
Nouns
English	Achomi	New Persian	Notes
House	khan, خان	khoneh, خونه	Bahraini Arabic and Middle Persian refer to hotel as "Khan" as well
Bracelet	Khonj: اسرتی Fedagh: بژبن Bandari/Langi: بنگلی Lari: میل/میلی Herang: ببو Burdestan: سوکی	دستبند، النگو	
Rose of Jericho	Khonj: اِدرَه Jenah: هَندَرَه Fedagh: اُندُرُ Evaz: هِدره Ashkana/Kemashk: اَندِره Ehal: هُزرَه Other: شمسیل، اُندِرو، اُندِره	چنگ مریم	
Frog	بک، بکریک، بکروک، بکو، بُکی، بَکی، باباهوی	قورباغه	
Boy	پُس، چوک	پِسر	
Hair strand	تال موی	تار موی	
Uncovered/Bare	پاپتی	برهنه	
Afternoon	پَسین, Pesin	بعد از ظهر	
Aunt	دامون	عمة/خاله	
Girl	کچ، دُخت	دُختر	
Sun	افتاو	آفتاب	
Sleep	خَو	خواب	
Breakfast	ناشتا	صبحانه	
Eye	چش/چیش	چشم	
Ear	گُش	گوش	
Teeth	ددو	دندان	
Mouth	کپ	دهن	
Beard	لش	ریش	Reesh in Arabic (ريش) means Feather
Brow	برم	ابرو	
Tongue	ازبو	زبون	
Nose	پیز	دماغ	Demagh (دماغ) is used to refer to the Brain in Arabic. While in some Gulf Arabic dialects, Buz (بوز) is used to refer to the mouth (noted to be from an older Iranian dialect).
Door	دروازه/در	در	
Socks	دو لاغ (لاخ)	جوراب	In Gulf Arabic they also say Dolagh (دولاغ), as opposed to formal Arabic (جورب).
Sandal	چِپَلی	کفش راحتی/صندل	
Cave	اِشکَت	غار	
North	سرحد/گَهدِم/گَهدِم/گاه	شمال	
Sand	بَل	خاک	
Sky	آسمو	آسمان/آسمون	
Waterfall	پَرتُنگَ آو	آبشار/آوشور	
Rain	بَرون/بَرو	باران/بارون	
Ice/Snow	بَفر	برف	
Tonight	إشو	امشب	
Today	اِروز	اِمروز	

Pronouns
English	Achomi	Kurdish	New Persian (Farsi)
I/me	اُم, om مُ, mo	Kurmanji: mi / min	Standard: من, romanized: man Bushehri: مو, romanized: mo
You	اُت, ot	Kurmanji: tu / te	Standard: تو, romanized: toe
He/she	اُش, osh	Kurmanji: wi	Standard: او, romanized: ou
We	مُ, mo	Kurmanji: me	Standard: ما, romanized: ma
You (plural)	تُ, to	Kurmanji: we	Standard: شما, romanized: shoma
They	شُ, sho	Kurmanji: wan	Standard: آنها, romanized: aneha Tehrani/Iranian: اینا, romanized: ena

=== Grammatical features ===
==== Past tense verbs ====
===== First type =====
To make simple past verbs

The ids (om / ot / osh / mo / to / sho) + The simple past root of the first type.

Example:

English	Achomi	Kurdish	New Persian (Farsi)
I told	اُم گُت, om got	Kurmanji: مِن گُت, romanized: Min got Sorani: گوتم, romanized: got am	Standard: گفتم/من گفتَم, romanized: goftam/man goftam
He/she won	اُش بو, Osh bu	Kurmanji: Wî/wê qezenc kir Sorani: ئەو سەرکەوت, romanized: iew serkewt	Standard: او برنده شد, romanized: o barandeh shod
You ate (plural)	تُ خا, To kha	Kurmanji: تی خوار, romanized: Te xwar Sorani: تون خوارن, romanized: to xwardnt xward	Standard: شما خورده اید, romanized: shma khordeh id Tehrani/Iranian: شما خوردین, romanized: shoma khorden

===== Second type =====
The root of the past simple second type + ids (em / esh / ruleless / am / ee / en)

Example:

English	Achomi	Kurdish	New Persian (Farsi)
Went (I)	چِد اِم, Ched em	Kurmanji: çûm	Standard: رفته‌ام, romanized: raftah-am Tehrani/Iranian: رفتَم, romanized: raftam Bushehri: رفتُم, romanized: raftom
Went (you)	چِد اِش, Ched esh	Kurmanji: çûyî	Standard: رفتی, romanized: rafti
Went (she/he)	چو, Chu	Kurmanji: çû	Standard: رفت, romanized: raft
Went (we)	چِد اَم, Ched am	Kurmanji: çûn	Standard: رفتیم, romanized: raftim
Went (you-plural)	چِد ای, Ched ee	Kurmanji: çûyî	Standard: رفته اید, romanized: rafteh id Tehrani/Iranian: رفتین, romanized: rafteen
Went (they)	چِد اِن, Ched en	Kurmanji: çûn	Standard: رفتند, romanized: raftand Tehrani/Iranian: رفتن, romanized: raftan

And...

==== Ergativity ====
To create an ergative verb in past tense we can use the verb root plus its proper prefix.

For example, in Achomi, the root for the verb "to tell" is "got" (gota equals "tell").

English	Achomi	Kurdish	New Persian (Farsi)
I told	اُم گُت, om got	Kurmanji: mi/min got	Standard: گفتم/من گفتم, romanized: goftam/man goftam
You told	اُت گُت, ot got	Kurmanji: tu/te got	Standard: شما گفتید, romanized: shma goftid Tehrani/Iranian: تو گفتی, romanized: to gofti
He/she told	اُش گُت, osh got	Kurmanji: wi got	Standard: او گفت, romanized: o goft
We told	مُ گُت, mo got	Kurmanji: me got	Standard: گفتیم/ما گفتیم, romanized: goftim/ma goftim
You (plural) told	تُ گُت, to got	Kurmanji: we got	Standard: شما گفتید, romanized: shoma goftid Tehrani/Iranian: شما گفتید, romanized: shoma gofteen
They told	شُ گُت, sho got	Kurmanji: wan got	Standard: گفتند/آنها گفتند, romanized: goftand/aneya goftand Tehrani/Iranian: گفتن/اینا گفتن, romanized: goftan/ena goftan

Another example: "deda" means "see," and "dee" Kurdish (Deed or dee) is the root verb. So:

English	Achomi	Kurdish	New Persian (Farsi)
I saw	اُم دِی, om dee	Kurmanji: mi/min deed/dee	Standard: دیدم/من دیدم, romanized: didam/man didam
You saw	اُت دِی, ot dee	Kurmanji: tu/te dee	Standard: دیدی/شما دیدید, romanized: didi/shoma didid
He/she saw	اُش دِی, osh dee	Kurmanji: wi dee	Standard: او دید, romanized: ou deed
We saw	مُ دِی, mo dee	Kurmanji: me dee	Standard: ما دیدیم, romanized: ma deedeem
You (plural) saw	تُ دِی, to dee	Kurmanji: we dee	Standard: تو دیدی, romanized: toe deedy
They saw	شُ دِی, sho dee	Kurmanji: wan dee	Standard: آنها دیدن, romanized: inha deedan

==== Simple present ====
To create a simple present or continued present tense of a transitive verb, here's another example:

English	Achomi	Kurdish (Karmanji)	New Persian (Farsi)
I am telling...	اَ گُت اِم, a got a'em	Ez dibêjim...	Standard: دارم میگم..., romanized: daram migam
You are telling...	اَ گُت اِش, a got a'esh	Tu dibêjî...	Standard: تو داری میگی..., romanized: to dari migi
He/she is telling...	اَ گُت اَی, a got ay	Ew dibêje ...	Standard: داره میگه..., romanized: dareh migeh... Bushehri: هاسی میگه..., romanized: hasey migah
We are telling	اَ گُت اَم, a got a'am	Em dibêjin	Standard: داریم می گوییم, romanized: darim mi guyim Tehrani/Iranian: داریم میگیم, romanized: darim mi gim Bushehri: هاسی/هاسیم میگیم..., romanized: hasey\hasim migim
You (pl) are telling...	اَ گُت اِی, a got ee	Tu dibêjî	Standard: شما می گویید, romanized: shma mi guyid Tehrani/Iranian: شما میگین, romanized: shma migin
They are telling...	اَ گُت اِن, a got a'en	Ew dibêjin ...	Standard: دارند می گویند, romanized: darand mi guyand Tehrani/Iranian: دارن میگن, romanized: daran mi gan

For the verb "see" ("deda"):

adead'em, adeda'esh, adeaday,...

=== Sentences ===
Source Material
Achomi	New Persian (Farsi)	English
اوش گت اِ خَش نی osh got e khash ne	Standard: او گفت این خوب نیست, romanized: o goft en khob neest Bushehri: او گفت این نه خوبه	He/she said this is not good
ریبای اُش گُت: مَم نای خونَه مِن Ribay osh got: Mam nay khone min	Standard: روباه گفت: من نیازی ندارم، من خانه‌ای دارَم Tehrani/Iranian: روباه گفت: من نیازی ندارم، خونه دارَم Bushehri: روباه گفت: مو نیازی ندارُم، مو خونه‌ای دارُم	The fox said: I don't need it, I have a home already.
اُشنا فَمی چُنگ بُکُن اِران فِک کَت اُچی اَ خونَه‌ی دامونِ اُشتُری Oshna fami chung bokon eran fek kat ochi a khone-ye damon-e oshtori	Standard: او نمی‌دانست چه کار کند، فکر کرد می‌تواند برود به خانه‌ی خاله شتر Tehrani/Iranian: اون نمی‌دونست چی کار کنه، فکر کرد می‌تونه بره خونه‌ی خاله شتر Bushehri: روباه گفت: مو نیازی ندارُم، مو خونه‌ای دارُم	He didn't know what to do, he thought he could go to the aunt camel's house.
دامون اُشتُری در واز اُشکی، اوی گُت: از کَ هُندش Damon oshtori dar vaz oshki, oy got: Az ka hondash	Standard: خاله شتر در را باز کرد، او گفت: از کجا آمدی؟	The aunt camel opened the door, he/she said: where did you come from?
ریبای: مَ از خونمو ribay: ma az khonamo	Standard: روباه: من از خانه آمده ام Bushehri: روباه: مو از خانه آمدُم	Fox: I [came] from home
دامونٍ أُشتُرى اگی: بَر جِه هُندِسِش اَ اِكِه؟ damone oshtori agee: bar che honsesh aeke?	Standard: خاله شتر گفت: برای چی آمدی اینجا؟ Tehrani/Iranian: خاله شتر گفت: چرا آمدی اینجا؟ Bushehri: خاله شتر گفت: سی چه آمدی اینجا؟	Camel aunt said: why did you come here?
ربياى: خونم پر تا پره او بُده ribay: khonamo por ta pore ow bode		Fox: my home was full of water
أُشتُرى: بِدو اِ كِه پَس دَروازَ هُخَت oshtori: bedo eke pase darvaza okhat		Camel: sleep behind my door
ربياى: مَ مِ کِ نا خَتِم, دَروازَى گُتى گُتى مَ لى بِكِت ribay: ma meke nakhatem, daravazy goti goti Mali beket	Standard: روباه: من نمی توانم آنجا بخوابم، ممکن است در بزرگ روی من بیفتد Tehrani/Iranian: روباه: من اونجا نمیتونم بخوابم، در بزرگ ممکنه رو سرم بیفته Bushehri: روباه: مو اونجا نمیتونُم بِخوسُم، دروازه گتو ممکنه رو کله‌ام/سرُم بیفته	Fox: I can't sleep there, the big door might fall on me
أُشتُرى: نِپَ بُرو پَنِ خُمَ هُخَت oshtori: nepa boro pane khoma hokhat		Camel: go sleep next to the park
ریبای اگی: خومَه ى كُتى كُتى مَلى بِكِت robaye agee: khomaye goti goti Mali beket		
شَ هَرجُ اَگُت هُخَت شَ گُت مَ ناخَتِم sha harjo agot hokhat, shagot ma nakhatem	Standard: هر جا بهش گفت بخواب، گفت نمی‌خوابَم Bushehri: هر جا سیش گفت بخوس، گفت نمی‌خوسُم	Wherever he told him to sleep he said I wont sleep

=== Poetry ===
Bastaki Dialect – Gol Bustan (Ali Akbar Bastaki ver)
Achomi	New Persian (Farsi)	English
گل بستانِن اسمُش نادُنِم Gol bostanen esmush nadonem سرو گلستانِن اسمُش نادُنِم Sarv golestanen esmush nadonem	گل بوستان است، نامش را نمی‌برم سرو گلستان است، نامش را نمی‌دانم	The flower is from the garden, but I do not mention its name. The cypress is from the grove, but I do not know its name.
جمال زیبایش هَرکِش نَدِدُه Jamal zibayesh har kesh nadede چون ماه تابانِن اسمُش نادُنِم Chon mah tabanen esmush nadonem	چهرهٔ زیبای او را هر کس ندیده‌است [بداند که] چون ماه تابان است، نامش را نمی‌دانم	Those who have not seen their beautiful face [should know that] It shines like the radiant moon, but I do not know their name.
کمند گیسویش حلقه‌حلقه هِن Kamand gisuyehsh halqeh-halqeh hen چو عنبرافشانِن اسمُش نادُنِم cho anbara afshanen esmush nadonem	گیسویش همچون کمندی، حلقه‌حلقه است، که عطر عنبر می‌پراکند – نامش را نمی‌دانم.	Her hair, like a lasso, is curled in perfect rings, Scattering the fragrance of ambergris – I do not know her name.
بِگِرد رخسار ماه اَنوَرُش Begard rokhsar mah anvoresho گِزِیْرِ چوگانِن اسمُش نادُنِم Gezir-e choganen esmush nadonem	بر گرد عارضش ماه انوری است که زیر چوگان [زلفش محاط] است، نامش را نمی‌دانم	Around their visage is a luminous moon, Encircled beneath the arc of their tresses, but I do not know their name.
کمان ابرویش وقت قصد دل Kaman abruyesh vaght qasd del با تیر مژگانِن اسمُش نادُنِم Ba tir-e mozhganen esmush nadonem	کمان ابروی او [در] هنگام شکار دل [عاشق] به همراه تیر مژگان است، نامش را نمی‌دانم	The bow of their eyebrow, in the hunt for a lover's heart, Is accompanied by the arrow of their lashes, but I do not know their name.
چشمان شهلایَش پناهم بخدا Cheshman-e shahlayash panah-am be khoda رهزن ایمانِن اسمُش نادُنِم Rahzan-e iman-en esmush nadonem	[از] چشمان شهلای او پناه به خدا می‌برم [که] رهزن ایمان است، نامش را نمی‌دانم	I seek refuge in God from their captivating, doe-like eyes, For they are a thief of faith, but I do not know their name.
دماغ باریکش پَترِنُویْ طلا Damaq-e barikash patrenavi tala چن چفت و موزونِن اسمُش نادُنِم Chen cheft o mozounen esmush nadonem	[بر] بینی باریک او پتری طلا چقدر متناسب و موزون است، نامش را نمی‌دانم	Upon their slender nose lies a golden ornament, So perfectly balanced and harmonious, but I do not know their name.
دهان چون میمش دُرْجِ مُرْوَرِی Dahan chon mimash dorj-e morvari پستهٔ خندانِن اسمُش نادُنِم Pesteh khandanen esmush nadonem	دهان چون میم او [که] پر از مروارید است پستهٔ خندان را مانَد، نامش را نمی‌دانم	Her mouth, shaped like the letter Mīm, is filled with pearls, It resembles a laughing pistachio; I do not know her name.
لعل لب قندُش چون نبات ناب La’l-e lab-e ghandesh chon nabat-e nab عقیق و مرجانِن اسمُش نادُنِم Aqiq o marjanen esmush nadonem	لعل لب شکرینش چون نبات و یا [چون] عقیق و مرجان است، نامش را نمی‌دانم	Her sweet lips of ruby are like sugarcane, Or like agate and coral; I do not know her name.
در مجلس صحبت خوش‌مَثَل چُونُویْ Dar majles sohbat khosh-masale chonovey بلبل خوش‌خوانِن اسمُش نادُنِم Bolbol-e khosh-khanen esmush nadonem	در گفتگو و سخن از بس خوش‌صحبت است [مانند] بلبل خوش‌خوان است، نامش را نمی‌دانم	In conversation and speech, she is so charming, She is like a sweet-singing nightingale; I do not know her name.
لِه سینهٔ صافُش آخی بر دلم Le sineh safesh, akhi bar delam دو سیب پستانِن اسمُش نادُنِم Do sib-e pestanen esmush nadonem	روی سینهٔ صافش، ای وای بر دلم پستان او چون دو سیب است، نامش را نمی‌دانم	On her smooth chest—oh, woe to my heart! Her breasts are like two apples; I do not know her name.
همچون دل عاشق بیقرار و تاب Hamchon del-e asheq biqarar o tab زیبق لرزانِن اسمُش نادُنِم Zeybaq-e larzanen esmush nadonem		
فیروزه‌انگشتر شَه انگشت بلور Firouzeh angoshtar-e shah angosht-e bolour دست پُر بِهْبانِن[ح] اسمُش نادُنِم Dast-e por behbanen esmush nadonem		
هنگام آرایش زیب صورتُش Hengam-e arayesh zeyb-e sooratesh مشاطَه حیرانِن اسمُش نادُنِم Mashateh heyranen esmush nadonem	به هنگام آرایش، [از] زیبایی صورت او مشاطه حیران است، نامش را نمی‌دانم	When adorned, her face is so beautiful That even the beautician is left astonished; I do not know her name.
تِی سوخْتَنِی[خ] چِیْتُش وقتی شَه سُرُه Ti sokhtane chitash vaghti shah sareh آشوب دورانِن اسمُش نادُنِم Ashoob-e dorananen esmush nadonem	[با] نقاب و سرپوش چیت وقتی که بر سر دارد آشوب‌گر دوران است، نامش را نمی‌دانم	With her veil and cotton scarf upon her head, She is the turmoil of her time; I do not know her name.
جُمخُو مَلَس‌جُوزِی غرق پولکی Jomkho malas-jozi qarq-e poolaki تا وَرِ کیبانِن اسمُش نادُنِم Ta var-e keibanen esmush nadonem	پیراهن ابریشمین گل‌درشت او [که] غرق از پولک [طلایی] است [کوتاه] و تا لبهٔ آغاز دامن [او]ست، نامش را نمی‌دانم	Her floral silk dress, covered in golden sequins, Short and just above the hemline; I do not know her name.
شلوار یَکتاکِی چیتِ اطلسی Shalvar-e yaktake chit-e atlasi به پای جانانِن اسمُش نادُنِم Be pay-e jananen esmush nadonem	شلوار یک‌طرفهٔ [دامن] او از چیت اطلسی به پای او جانانه [و خوش‌نما] است، نامش را نمی‌دانم	Her one-sided skirt of atlas cotton Graces her legs beautifully; I do not know her name.
از مُو دل اُشبُردُه ان مَپِش بگُوی Az mo del eshborde an mapash begoy که شاه خوبانِن اسمُش نادُنِم Ke shah-e khobanen esmush nadonem	از من دلم را ربوده‌است، کسی نزد او [این سخن را] نگوید که او شاه خوبان است، نامش را نمی‌دانم	She has stolen my heart—let no one tell her this, For she is the queen of beauties; I do not know her name.
دیوانه اُشکردِم نادُنِم کِه هِن Divaneh-osh kerdem nadonem ke hen دل از غَمُش خونِن اسمُش نادُنِم Del az ghamash khoonen esmush nadonem	مرا دیوانه کرده‌است و نمی‌دانم که کیست دل [من] از غمش خون است، نامش را نمی‌دانم	She has driven me mad, and I do not know who she is, My heart bleeds from her sorrow; I do not know her name.
از ساعتی کِمْدِی هنگام پَسین Az sa’ati kemdi hangam-e pasin چشم مُو گریانِن اسمُش نادُنِم Cheshm-e mo geryanen esmush nadonem	از لحظه‌ای که به هنگام بعد از ظهر دیدمش چشم من گریان است، نامش را نمی‌دانم	Since the moment I saw her that afternoon, My eyes have been tearful; I do not know her name.
مَکِس خریدارِن بَر اِنِ مَخَه Makas kharidaren bar en makhah یوسف کنعانِن اسمُش نادُنِم Yousef-e Kan’ananen esmush nadonem	همه‌کس خریدار او هستند [با آنچنان عشوه و دلربایی‌اش]، مگر او یوسف کنعانی است، نامش را نمی‌دانم	Everyone admires her with such charm and grace— Could she be Joseph of Canaan? I do not know her name.
عاشق رخسارُش والله که وَ دل Asheq-e rokhsar-osh vallah ke va del غمناک و محزونِن اسمُش نادُنِم Ghamnak o mahzounen esmush nadonem		

Lari Dialect – Mansour Arnvaz
Achomi	New Persian (Farsi)	English
تا بهاره بِدا تَو چَم بَر اَصَحرَو بُكُنَم اَمِن خرمن گل بازي اَتَي تَو بكنم	وقتی بهار می‌رسد، در دشت‌ها و صحراها قدم خواهم زد، و در خرمن گل‌ها به دلخواه بازی خواهم کرد.	When spring arrives, I will wander along the plains and deserts, I will play with the fields of flowers as much as I desire.
چُنِ مهتاب بدا تا شَو نِخَتَم تا گل صبح كسي نادُو كه صَبا رُز شَواشَو بُكُنَم	مانند نور ماه، تا طلوع صبح بیدار خواهم ماند، و کسی نخواهد دانست که صبح را با نسیم به آواز می‌خوانم.	Like moonlight, I will stay awake until dawn, until the morning blooms, No one will know that I turn the morning breeze into song.
مخملِ سَوز شَبَر دشت بيابو اَمَه جا بِدا ازتَم بِشَخَم غصَه شَوا اَو بُكُنَم	روی مخمل دشت‌های بیابانی در شب، غم‌هایم را دور می‌کنم و آن‌ها را به آب تبدیل می‌کنم.	On the velvet-strewn fields of the desert at night, I will scatter my sorrows away and turn them into water.
چه خَشه بوي گل شبّو كه مُناره تا پسين چَش اَلوي يك اُنِسَم يك چُندُكوي خَو بُكُنم	چه بوی خوشی از گل شب‌بو که تا غروب می‌پیچد، به آن خیره می‌شوم و در آغوشش به خوابی آرام فرو می‌روم.	How sweet is the fragrance of night-blooming jasmine at sunset, I will gaze upon it and sleep peacefully in its embrace.
آسمون ابري بُبُو بَرو بيا نَم پَروار اَمَه جا اَو بِگِره شايت اُچَم دَو بُكُنَم	وقتی آسمان ابری شود، باران ببارد، و مه پراکنده شود، بگذار آب اینجا را پر کند، شاید تشنگی‌ام را سیلاب کند.	When the sky turns cloudy, rain falls, and mist spreads, Let water fill this place, and perhaps it will flood my thirst.
چُنِ مورِدِ سَوز از تاي بركه بُده مالامال بدا تا تي تَخِ بِركَه اَو اَسَكرَو بُكُنَم	مانند برگ‌های مورد که برکه را می‌سوزاند و پر می‌کند، سطح برکه تو را پر می‌کنم و سوزش را با آب خاموش می‌کنم.	Like the burning myrtle leaves filling the pond, I will fill your pond's surface and quench the burning with water.

== See also ==
- Kuwaiti Persian
- Kumzari language
