= Kermanshahi Persian =

Persian language dialect

- Kermashani Persian
- فارسی کرمانشاهی, کرماشانی
- Pronunciation: Pārsi-e Kermānšāhi, Pārsi-e Kermāšāni
- Native to: Kermanshah
- Region: Iranian Kurdistan
- Ethnicity: Persians, Kurds
- Language family: Indo-European: Indo-Iranian; Iranic; Western Iranic; Southwestern Iranic; Persian; Western Persian; Kermanshahi Persian
- Early forms: Old Persian: Middle Persian; Early New Persian
- Writing system: Persian alphabet (Iran)

Language codes
- ISO 639-3: –

The Kermanshahi dialect is a dialect of the Persian language spoken in the city of Kermanshah, Eslamabad-e Gharb and Kangavar. A prominent feature of the Kermanshahi Persian dialect is the use of a number of Kurdish words and verbs, which can be seen in transformed and paid forms in the Kermanshahi Persian sentences. There are phonetic, lexical, and syntactic differences between Kermanshahi Persian and standard Persian, which arose due to the influence of Kermanshahi Kurdish. The Persian dialect of Kermanshah is considered the most western dialect of the Persian language.
