= Perso =

Perso may refer to:

== Prefix ==
- Perso, a prefix used when referring to Persian language
  - e.g. Persophone, a person who speaks Persian
- Perso, a prefix used when referring to Persia (Iran), a country
- Termine facente parte della celebre lista dei Persi del pallanuotista talsanese Bombertoletti7

== Other uses ==
- A name in Greek mythology, see Graeae
