= Hazaragi dialects =

Persian dialect spoken by the Hazara people

Hazaragi
- هزارگی
- The words Hazāragi, Āzargi, and Azargi written in Persian calligraphy (Nastaliq).
- Native to: Afghanistan
- Ethnicity: Hazaras
- Native speakers: 5 million (2023)
- Language family: Indo-European: Indo-Iranian; Iranian; Western Iranian; Southwestern Iranian; Persian; Eastern; Hazaragi
- Writing system: Persian alphabet

Language codes
- ISO 639-3: haz
- Glottolog: haza1239

Hazaragi (Note: Dari: هزارگی, romanized: Hazāragī, cyrillized: Ҳазорагӣ, pronounced [(h)ɐˌzɑːɾɐˈɡiː]; Hazaragi pronunciation: [ʔɔːzäɾɡí, ʔɔːzuɾäɡí]) refers to a group of dialects of Dari Persian. Dari Persian, also known as Dari, is an eastern variety of the Persian language and has many dialects throughout Afghanistan.

== Classification ==
Hazaragi dialects fall under Dari, an eastern variety of Persian. Dari is one of the two official Languages of Afghanistan. Persian is a prominent member of the Iranian branch of the Indo-European language family. The Hazaragi dialects of Dari and the standard Kabuli dialect of Dari are mutually intelligible, with the primary differences being accents. In Daykundi, the local dialect of Dari contains some Turkic loanwords via Karluk.

== Geographic distribution and diaspora ==
Hazaragi dialects are mainly spoken by the Hazara people, who are native to and mainly live in Afghanistan.

As part of the larger Afghan diaspora, the Hazara diaspora has led to many Hazara Afghans living, or being born, in Pakistan and Iran. As a result, many Afghan-Pakistanis (particularly in Quetta), and Afghan-Iranians (particularly in Mashhad), speak Hazaragi dialects of Dari. Along with the diaspora in eastern Uzbekistan, northern Tajikistan, the Americas, Europe, and Australia. The influx of Afghan refugees in Iran has caused there to be an estimated total of 399,000 Dari speakers of Hazaragi dialects in the country, as of 2021.

Hazaragi is spoken by hazara or azaragi people in Hazarajat, in central Afghanistan. the number of Hazaragi speaker people is around 1.8 million. The size of Hazara community has declined they forced to migration land grabbing. During the King Amir Abdur Rahman Khan (1880-1901) He led genocid and killed and enslaved many Hazara and tooke their homes and land. After him Hazara people face some challenges in the job, school. Hazara people lives in different places in central Afghanistan, Pakistan and Iran. Most of the Hazara Shia Muslims and some of the are Sunnie Muslim. Hazara people in Afghanistan has their own culture and traditions. they are very crafty peoples and they make music in their own dialect.They have their own cutlure dress, jewelry, music and food. Hazara people they are the native poeple in Afghanistan ther were before Islame came. Abdur Rahamn khan killd 1 million of Hazara people and took their land.

== Turkic and Mongolic influences ==
Some dialects of Dari spoken by Hazaras contain many Turkic loanwords. According to Temirkhanov, the Mongolian elements make up 10% of the Hazara vocabulary. An Iranica article on Dari dialects of the Hazaras states that they consist of three linguistic layers: pre-Mongol Hazaragi Persian; the Mongolian language; and Tajik, another eastern variety of the Persian language.

According to Efimov, examples of vocabulary in Hazaragi dialects that reflect Turkic influence include ata ('father'), qara ('black'), kunda ('plow'), qōš ('eyebrow'), while words of Mongolic origin include bêri ('bride'), alaḡa ('palm of the hand'), qulaḡay ('thief'), ōɡ̄il ('village'). German Iranologist Michael Weiers notes that a key distinguishing feature of the Hazaragi dialects are its Turco-Mongolic lexical components. Besides that, the Hazaragi dialects remain structurally similar to the Kabuli dialect of Dari Persian.

== Grammatical structure ==
The grammatical structure of the Hazaragi dialects of Dari are identical to that of the Kabuli dialect.

=== Phonology ===
Vowel phonemes of the Hazaragi dialects of Dari
	Front	Back
High	i	u
High	i	ʊ
Mid	e	ɔ
Low	a	

/a/ can also approach the sound [æ] or [ɛ].

Hazaragi dialects contain the voiced fricative /ɣ/, and the labial–velar approximant /w/. Unlike in other Persian dialects, the retroflex stops /ʈ/ and /ɖ/ are found. The voiceless glottal fricative /h/ is often dropped. The convergence of the voiceless uvular plosive /q/ (ق) and the voiced velar fricative /ɣ/ (غ) in Western Persian is treated as separate phonemes in Hazaragi dialects.

Diphthongs include /aj/, /aw/, and /ew/ (cf. Iranian Persian ey, ow, uw). The vocalic system is eastern Persian, characterized by the loss of length distinction, the retention of mid-vowels, and the rounding of ā and å/o, alternating with its merger with a or û (cf. Iranian Persian ān).

Stress is dynamic and same to that in the Kabuli dialect of Dari and Tajik, and are thus not variable. Stress generally falls on the last syllable of a nominal word form, including derivative suffixes and several morphological markers. Typical is the insertion of epenthetic vowels in consonant clusters (e.g., pašm > póšum; 'wool') and final devoicing (e.g., ḵût; 'self, own').

Consonant phonemes of the Hazaragi dialects of Dari
		Labial	Dental	Alveolar	Retroflex	Palato- alveolar	Velar	Uvular	Glottal
Nasal		m		n					
Plosive/ Affricate	voiceless	p	t̪		ʈ	tʃ	k	q	
Plosive/ Affricate	voiced	b	d̪		ɖ	dʒ	ɡ		
Flap/Trill				r					
Fricative	voiceless	f		s		ʃ	x		(h)
Fricative	voiced			z		ʒ	ɣ		
Approximant		w		l		j			

[h] only occurs infrequently and among more educated speakers. /r/ can be heard as either a trill [r] or a tap [ɾ]. /x, ɣ/ can also range to uvular sounds [χ, ʁ].

Hazaragi dialects is a dialect of Dari (Farsi) spoken by the Hazara or azaragi peoples in the Hazarajat. The Grammar is the same as Dari like ma means I and tu or shuma means you. But the prounciation is a little bit different from the Dari or Kabul's dialects and the vowel is the same ا (Alef) a, و (Wāw) o or u, ی (Yā) e.

=== Nominal morphology ===
The most productive derivative marker is -i, and the plural markers are -o for the inanimate (as in kitab-o, meaning 'books'; cf. Iranian Persian -hā) and -û for the animate (as in birar-û, meaning 'brothers'; cf. Iranian Persian -ān). The emphatic vocative marker is û or -o, the indefinite marker is -i, and the specific object marker is -(r)a. The comparative marker is -tar (as in kalû-tar; 'bigger'). Dependent adjectives and nouns follow the head noun and are connected by -i (as in kitab-i mamud; 'book of Mahmud'). Topicalized possessors precede the head noun marked by the resumptive personal suffix (as in Zulmay ayê-ši; lit. 'Zulmay her mother'). Prepositions include, in addition to the standard Persian ones, ḵun(i) ('with; using'), da ('in'; cf. Iranian Persian dar); the latter often replaces ba ('to') in dative function. Loaned postpositions include comitative -qati ('together with') and (az)-worî ('like'). Interrogatives typically function also as indefinite (as in kudam; 'which; someone').

Pronouns in the Hazaragi dialects of Dari [English] (Iranian Persian)
Singular/Plural	First person	Second person	Third person
singular	ma [me, I] (man)	tu [you] (tu)	e/u [this/that] (w)
plural	mû [we, us] (mo)	šimû/šumû (cumo)	yo/wo [these/those] (icon)
singular	-um [mine] -em	-it/khu/–tû [your/yours] (-et)	-iš/-(i)ši [his/hers] (-ec)
plural	-mû [ours] (-emon)	–tû/-šimû/šumû [your/yours] (-eton)	-iš/-(i)ši [their] (-econ)

=== Particles, conjunctions, modals, and adverbials ===
These include atê/arê ('yes'); amma or wali ('but'); balki ('however'); šaydi ('perhaps') ale ('now'); and wuḵt-a ('then'). These are also marked by distinctive initial stress.

The Hazaragi dialects of Dari particles, conjunctions, modals, and adverbials
Hazaragi-Dari	Iranian Persian	English
amyale	aknun	now
dalil'dera	dalil darad	maybe

=== Verb morphology ===
The imperfective marker is the prefix mi- (assimilated variants: m-, mu-, m-, mê-), as in the conjugated verb mi-zan-um ('I am hitting'). The subjunctive and imperative marker is bi- (with similar assimilation). The negation prefix is na- and is placed before all other prefixes, as in na-mi-zad-um ('I was not hitting'). These typically attract stress.

=== Tenses ===
The tense, mood, and aspect systems are somewhat different from Western Persian. The basic tense system is threefold: present-future, past, and remote (pluperfect). New modal paradigms developed in addition to the subjunctives:

- The non-seen/mirative that originates in the resultative-stative perfect (e.g., zad-ēm; cf. Iranian Persian zada(e) am), which has largely lost its non-modal use;
- the potential, or assumptive, which is marked by the invariant ḵot (cf. Persian xāh-ad or xād; 'it wants, it intends') combined with the indicate and subjunctive forms.

Moreover, all past and remote forms have developed imperfective forms marked by mi-. There are doubts about several of the less commonly found, or recorded, forms, in particular those with ḵot. However, the systematic arrangement of all forms according to their morphological, as well as semantic, function shows that those forms fit well within the overall pattern. The system may tentatively be shown as follows, leaving out complex compound forms such as zada ḵot mu-buda baš-um.

In the assumptive, the distinction appears to be not between present versus past, but indefinite versus definite. Also, similar to all Persian dialects, the imperfective forms in mi-, and past perfect forms, such as mi-zad-um and zada bud-um, are used in irreal conditional clauses and wishes, e.g., kaški zimi qulba kadagi mu-but ('If the field would only be/have been plowed'). Modal verbs, such as tan- ('can'), are constructed with the perfect participle, e.g., ma bû-r-um, da čaman rasid-a ḵot tanist-um ('I shall go, and may be able to get to Chaman'). Participial nominalization is typical, both with the perfect participle (e.g., kad-a 'having done'), and with the derived participle with passive meaning kad-ag-i 'having been done'. E.g., zimin-i qulba kada-ya ('The field has been ploughed'), zamin-i qulba (na-)šuda-ra mi-ngar-um ('I am looking at a plowed/unplowed field'), imrûz [u ḵondagi] tikrar mu-kun-a ('Today he repeats reading what he had read'). The gerundive (e.g., kad-an-i 'to be done') is likewise productive, as in yag čiz, ki uftadani baš-a, ma u-ra qad-dist-ḵu girift-um, tulḡa kad-um ('One object, that was about to fall, I grabbed, and held it'). The clitic -ku or -ḵu topicalizes the parts of speech, and -di topicalizes the predicate; e.g., i-yši raft, ma-ḵu da ḵona mand-um ('He himself left; I, though, I stayed').

== See also ==
- Aimaq dialect
