= Abolhassan Najafi =

Iranian writer and translator

Abolhassan Najafi ابوالحسن نجفی
- Born: 28 June 1929; Isfahan
- Died: 22 January 2016 (aged 86); Tehran
- Education: Unfinished PhD in Linguistics from Sorbonne University
- Occupations: writer and translator
- Known for: member of the Academy of Persian Language and Literature

Abolhassan Najafi (Persian: ابوالحسن نجفی, also Romanized as "Abolhasan Najafī"; 28 June 1929 – 22 January 2016) was an Iranian writer and translator.

Najafi was born into a Persian family from Isfahan. He began his literary activities in the 1960s and translated several books from French into Persian. He co-published a successful literary periodical entitled Jong-e Isfahan (Persian: جُنگ اصفهان). After the Iranian revolution, he published a controversial book on Persian usage entitled Let's Avoid Mistakes (غلط ننویسیم).

Najafi published more than twenty books, among these a dictionary on Persian slang, elements of general linguistics and its application to the Persian language. He translated French novels to Persian, notable works from Jean-Paul Sartre (Le Diable et le bon Dieu, Les sequestres d'Altona, Qu'est-ce que la littérature), André Malraux (Antimémoire), Albert Camus (Caligula), Roger Martin du Gard (Les Thibault), Claude Lévi-Strauss (La race et l'histoire), and Antoine de Saint-Exupéry (Le Petit Prince).

Najafi was a member of the Academy of Persian Language and Literature (1990–2016).
