= Qeysar Aminpour =

Iranian poet (1959–2007)

Qeysar Aminpour (1959–2007; Persian: قیصر امین‌پور) was an Iranian poet. Aminpour was one of the several distinguished poets who can be considered the founder of post-Revolution Iranian poetry.

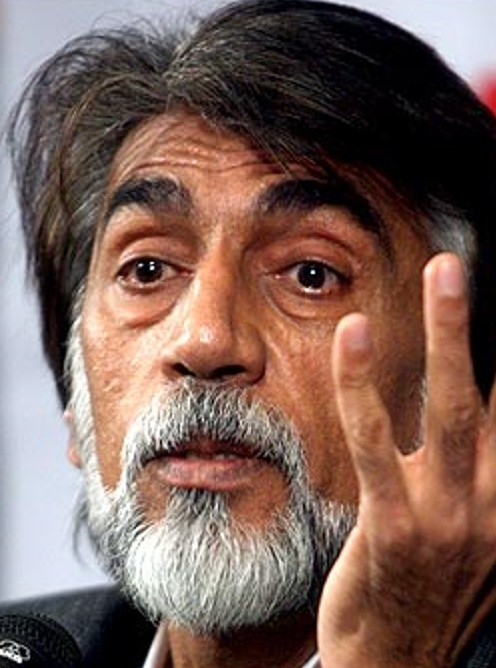
Qeysar Aminpoor in 2000s

== Biography ==
Aminpour was born in Gatvand near Dezful, the provincial capital of Iran's Khuzestan province. He completed early education in Dezful before leaving for the capital Tehran, where he intended to study veterinary medicine at the University of Tehran. However, he abandoned this plan and enrolled into social sciences in 1978.
