= Rudaki Institute of Language and Literature =

Language regulatory body in Tajikistan

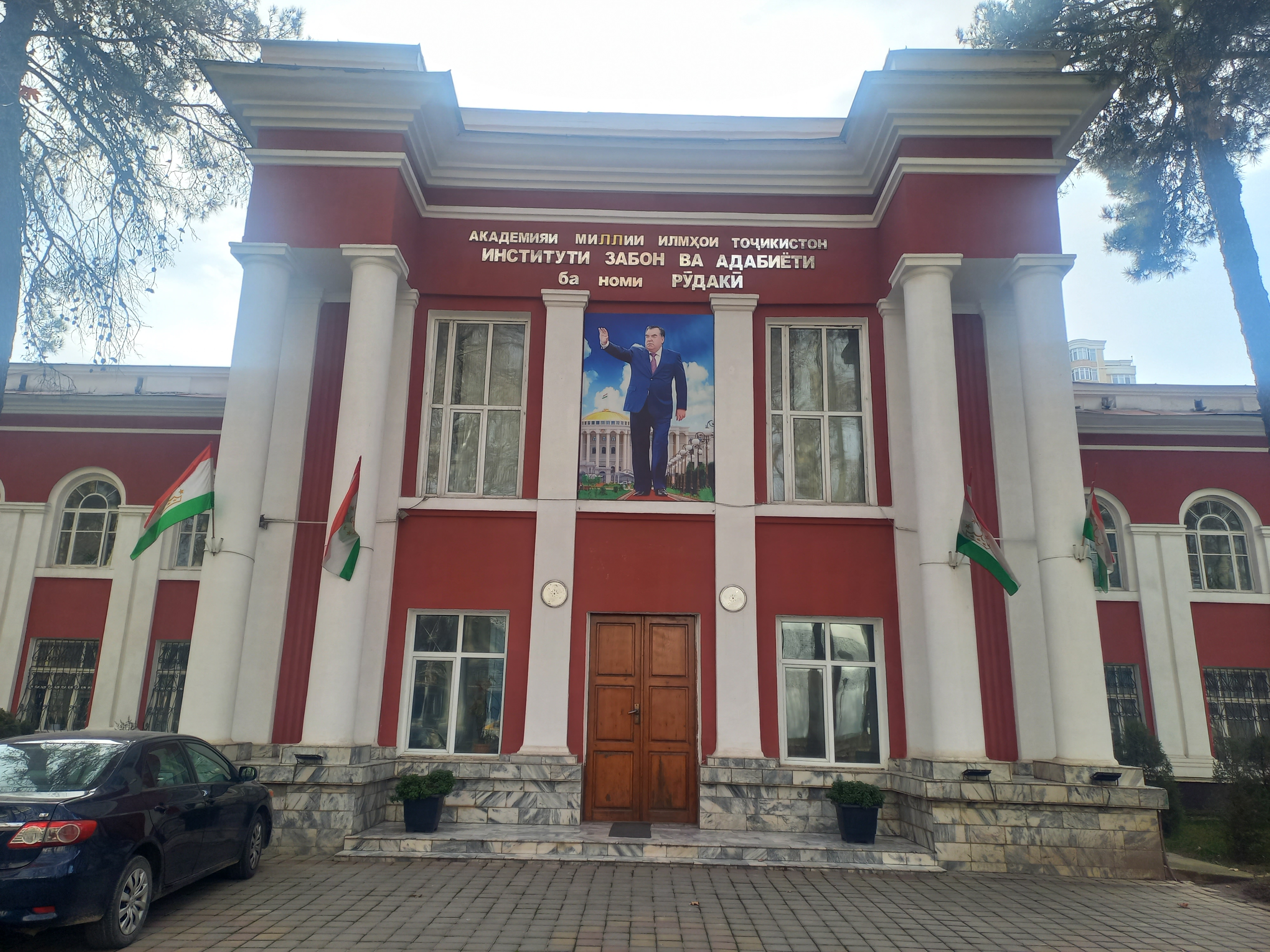
- Formation: March 17, 1932; 94 years ago
- Purpose: Regulatory body of the Tajik language.
- Headquarters: 21 Rudaki avenue, 734025, Dushanbe, Tajikistan
- Members: 153
- President: Saxidod Rahmatullozoda
- Website: https://www.izar.tj/

The Abuabdullo Rudaki Institute of Language and Literature (Tajik: Институти забон ва адабиёт ба номи А. Рӯдакӣ, romanized: Instituti Zabon va Adabiyot ba nomi A. Rūdakī; Russian: Институт языка и литературы имени А. Рудаки; Persian: انستیتوت زبان و ادبیات به نام ا. رودکی) is the regulatory body for the Tajik variety of Persian language, headquartered in Dushanbe, Tajikistan. It is one of the oldest research institutes in the Tajik Academy of Sciences; it acts as the official authority on the language and contributes to linguistic research on the Tajik language and other languages of Tajikistan.

The Institute of Language and Literature in the Tajik Republic was founded during the Soviet era on 17 March 1932. In 1958, on the 1100th anniversary of the birth of the founder of Persian-Tajik literature Abuabdullo Rudaki, the institute was named in his honour.

== See also ==
- Academy of Persian Language and Literature
- Academy of Sciences of Afghanistan
- Persian studies
