= Hanzala Badghisi =

Persian poet

Ḥanẓalah Bādghīsī or Hanzalah of Badghis (Persian: حنظله بادغیسی; fl. about 850) was one of the earliest Persian poets.

Hanzalah was born in Badghis, located in modern-day Afghanistan, and lived in the time of the Tahirids (820–872 AD), who gained the independence of Khorasan from the Abbasid Caliphate.

Persian biographer Muhammad Aufi praises the verses of Hanzalah by saying the graceful flow of his expression is like the "water of Paradise, and his verses have the freshness of cool wine (shamul) and the agreeableness of the northern wind (shamal)."

So well known were the poems of Hanzalah that they were worth gathering into a Persian divan, or collection, only a few fragments of which remain, however.

== Sipand and the evil eye ==
Here is a quatrain (the earliest ruba'i thus far quotable), which contains an odd conceit founded on an old superstition: the poet warns his sweetheart that it is futile for her to throw sipand or Syrian rue (Peganum harmala) seed on the fire to avert the influence of the evil eye.

یارم سپند گرچه بر آتش همی فکند
از بهر چشم، تا نرسد مر ورا گزند
او را سپند و آتش ناید همی به کار
با روی همچو آتش و با خال چون سپند

yāram sipand garči bar ātaš hamē fikand
az bahr-i čašm tā na-rasad mar wa-rā gazand
ō rā sipand u ātaš n-āyad hamē ba kār
bā rōy-i hamču ātaš u bā xāl-i čūn sipand

Though rue into the fire my dear one threw,
Lest from the evil eye some harm accrue,
'Twould naught avail her – either rue or fire;
Her face the fire – her beauteous mole the rue!

== Run the risk ==
More potent, however, was the charm in another stanza ascribed to Hanzalah, for it inspired a simple ass-herd to win a crown. Chancing one day to read four of Hanzalah's verses, this donkey-driver became fired with the ambition to attempt to gain the throne, and, rising triumphant over every obstacle, he finally grasped the sovereignty. The inspiring stanza which served the ass-herd king, Ahmad of Khujistan, as a motto for his life's success was this :

مهتری گر به کام شیر در است
شو خطر کن ز کام شیر بجوی
یا بزرگی و عز و نعمت و جاه
یا چو مردانت مرگ رویاروی

mihtarī gar ba kām-i šēr dar ast
šaw xatar kun zi kām-i šēr bijōy
yā buzurgī u ʽizz u niʽmat u jāh
yā ču mardānt marg rōyārōy

If lordship in a lion's jaws should hang,
Go, run the risk, and seize it from his fang;
Thine shall be greatness, glory, rank, and place,
Or else, like heroes, thine be death to face.

== Sources ==
- Davaran, Fereshteh (2010). Continuity in Iranian Identity: Resilience of a Cultural Heritage. Routledge. ISBN 978-1138780149.

Jackson, A. V. Williams. 1920. Early Persian Poetry: From the Beginnings Down to the Time of Firdausi. New York: Macmillan; pp. 17–19. (in the public domain).
