= Persian studies =

Interdisciplinary university studies program

Persian studies (Persian: مطالعات فارسی) is the study of the Persian language and its literature specifically. It is differentiated from Iranian studies which is a broader, more interdisciplinary subject that focuses more on the histories and cultures of all Iranian peoples.

== History of Persian Studies in Iran ==
=== Pre Islamic Era ===
The study of language in the region has early historical roots. The Avestan alphabet, developed during the late Sassanid Empire to precisely record orally transmitted Zoroastrian liturgies, was derived from the Pahlavi scripts. The Pahlavi writing system itself evolved from the Aramaic alphabet, a Semitic script known for its complex use of Aramaic heterograms. Prior to this, the Old Persian cuneiform was introduced as a commissioned monumental script for Achaemenid royal inscriptions. Its shapes were adapted directly from preexisting Mesopotamian cuneiform systems such as Akkadian and Elamite.

=== Islamic Era ===
Following the Islamic conquest of the Sasanian Empire, Arabic became the primary language of administration, religion, and scientific scholarship across the Islamic world, including the Iranian plateau. During this period, scholars originating from the region, such as the philosopher Avicenna (c. 980–1037), wrote their major scientific and philosophical treatises in Arabic, the 'lingua franca' of the era, while making occasional contributions in Persian.

The emergence of New Persian as a standardized literary language occurred in the 9th and 10th centuries in the eastern regions of Greater Iran. This development was heavily influenced by Arabic; it adopted the Arabic script, incorporated extensive Arabic vocabulary, and utilized Arabic poetic meters ('arud).

The revival and standardization of Persian literature were primarily driven by court patronage, with dynasties such as the Samanids and Ghaznavids sponsoring poets and writers to enhance their royal prestige. A prominent example is the poet Ferdowsi, who composed the national epic, the Shahnameh, under the patronage of the Turkic ruler Mahmud of Ghazni. Another key figure in this courtly literary environment was Asadi Tusi (d. 1072), who compiled one of the earliest Persian dictionaries to help standardize the language for poetry.

== European Study of Persian ==
=== Early encounters ===
Persian was the lingua franca of a wide area, not limited to Iran. The first Europeans to encounter the Persian language were the envoys and diplomats of early modern European nations sent first to Ottoman Turkey and then to other places. The earliest motivation for the study of Persian was to win converts to Christianity.

- Codex Cumanicus, a glossary of Persian and Cuman Turkish words in Latin.
- a translation of the Pentateuch into Persian by the Jew Tavus
- translations from Portuguese of Francis Xavier's History of Christ and History of Peter (c. 1602 CE)

=== Study of the living language, 17th century ===
Grammars and dictionaries of the Persian language were first composed in the 17th century during which efforts were made to understand the "Persian of the people". Later on, Persian, as it was used, declined in importance as Classical Persian literature was introduced to the continent.

- Raimondo of Cremona seems to have been the first to compose a grammatical sketch of Persian, but his manuscript remains unavailable.
- the Belgian priest de Dieu published Rudimentae Linguae Persicae (1639 CE) in which he established the basic phonology and morphology of Persian
- Pater Angelus (Joseph Labrosse) studied Persian for fourteen years in the capital of Esfahan as part of the Vatican's Oriental Mission. He published a monumental work composed of "fourteen folios of mini-grammar and over 450 pages of words and phrases of the living language."

=== Beginnings of Orientalism, 18th century ===
During this century, Europeans discovered the rich store of Classical Persian literature, and study of the Persian language meant the study of the language as it was used in these works. The first edition of the Gulistan of Sa'di was published in 1654 CE. As British trade with the Indian subcontinent increased, the focus of learning Persian shifted to the "colonial" Persian of India.

- Anquetil published the first edition of the texts of the Zoroastrian Parsis in his three-volume Zend-Avesta (1771 CE).
- William Jones's publication of his grammar (also in 1771 CE) marked when knowledge of Persian grammar became accessible since the prior works were not available to most people. He hoped the work would open up the study of the Persian Classics, but it was intended to assist East India Company employees. William Jones founded the Asiatic Society of Bengal (1784 CE), the first Oriental society.

=== Orientalism, rediscovery, 19th century ===
During this period of intense interest in the Orient, Persian proved to be one of the most important languages for the incipient field of Comparative Linguistics. Many scholars in prior centuries had commented on the similarities between Germanic and Iranian languages, but in the 19th century, scholars for the first time postulated a common ancestor to languages like Sanskrit, Persian, and European languages which has since come to be called the Proto-Indo-European language.

As important was the deciphering of Old Persian, the language of dozens of inscriptions which still stand in Iran. Sir Henry Rawlinson first discovered that the language of these inscriptions was an ancient form of the Persian language. Since these inscriptions often included inscriptions in other Cuneiform scripts, this decipherment became like a Rosetta Stone for the languages of ancient Mesopotamia. All that we know of the languages and histories of the empires of Babylonia Assyria, Sumer, Elam, and so on is indirectly indebted to the knowledge of the Persian language.

=== Modernization, 20th century ===
During the Qajar dynasty, Iranians first encountered Europeans in the context of the rise of the West. Napoleon's expedition to Egypt in 1798 CE was the first European intrusion into the Muslim Middle East and prefigured many more disruptions for the peoples of this region, especially Iran. Iran lost territory in several wars with Russia and Britain. Iran's economy suffered greatly as European sea lanes bypassed the legendary Silk Road which had always been a pillar of Iran's economy. New industrial processes of production made traditional ways of living impossible for Iranians. As in many other countries during this time like Japan, China, and Turkey, a nationalist reaction occurred in Iran as Iranians realized the importance of modernizing as quickly as possible to fight off the encroachment of the Western powers. It was at this point that modern educational institutions in Western tradition were first opened in Iran. Iran would never be the same, and the study of language there merged with the tradition in Europe.

== Persian Studies in the United States ==
- Harvard University
- Ohio State University
- San Francisco State University
- University of Maryland
- University of Texas at Austin
- University of Michigan at Ann Arbor
