= Academy of Persian Language and Literature =

Official regulatory institution of the Persian language

- Formation: May 20, 1935; 91 years ago
- Purpose: Regulatory body of the Persian language.
- Headquarters: Tehran, Iran
- Members: Around 300 persons
- President: Gholam-Ali Haddad-Adel
- Website: https://apll.ir/

The Academy of Persian Language and Literature (APLL; Persian: فرهنگستان زبان و ادب فارسی, Farhangestân-e Zabân-o Adab-e Fârsi) is the regulatory body for the Persian language, headquartered in Tehran, Iran. Formerly known as the Academy of Iran (فرهنگستان ایران, Farhangestân-e Iran), it was founded on 20 May 1935, by the initiative of Reza Shah, the first shah of the Pahlavi dynasty. The academy acts as the official authority on the language, and contributes to linguistic research on Persian and other Iranian languages.

== History ==
=== Early efforts ===
The first official efforts to protect the Persian language from foreign words and to standardise its spelling of Persian orthography were made in 1871, during the reign of Naser al-Din Shah Qajar. After Naser al-Din Shah, Mozaffar ad-Din Shah Qajar ordered the establishment of the first Persian association in 1903. This association officially declared that it used Persian roots as the only acceptable source for coining words. The ultimate goal was to prevent books from being printed with the wrong usage of words. According to the executive guarantee of this association, the government was responsible for wrongfully-printed books. Words coined by this association, such as rāh-āhan (راه‌آهن) for "railway", were printed in Soltani Newspaper (روزنامه سلطانی); but the association was eventually closed due to inattention.

A scientific association was founded in 1911, resulting in a dictionary called Words of Scientific Association (لغت انجمن علمی), which was completed in the future and renamed Katouzian Dictionary (فرهنگ کاتوزیان).

=== Establishment of the academy ===
The first academy for the Persian language was founded on 20 May 1935, under the name Academy of Iran. It was established by the initiative of Reza Shah, and mainly by Ali-Asghar Hekmat and Mohammad Ali Foroughi, all names in the nationalist movement of the time.

Ferdowsi was a motivation behind Reza Shah's decision to remove foreign loanwords from Persian and replacing them with Persian equivalents. In 1934, Reza Shah ordered the reconstruction of Ferdowsi's tomb and set up a country-wide ceremony in honour of a thousand years of Persian literature since the time of Ferdowsi, titled Ferdowsi millennial celebration, inviting notable Iranian and foreign scholars.

The members of the academy included a number of notable literary figures and highly celebrated scholars upon its foundation, including Abbas Eqbal Ashtiani, Mohammad-Taqi Bahar, Ali-Akbar Dehkhoda, Mohammad Ali Foroughi, Badiozzaman Forouzanfar, Homayun Forouzanfar, Qasem Ghani, Abdolazim Gharib, Allame Mohammad Qazvini, Mohammad Hejazi, Ali-Asghar Hekmat, Mahmoud Hessabi, Mohammad-Ali Jamalzadeh, Ahmad Matin-Daftari, Saeed Nafisi, Ebrahim Pourdavoud, Isa Sedigh, Zabihollah Safa, Ali Akbar Siassi, and Rashid Yasemi.

Some foreign scholars were also involved, such as Arthur Christensen (from Denmark), Mohammed Hussein Heikal (from Egypt), Abduqodir Maniyozov (from Tajikistan), Henry Masset (from France), Raf'at Pasha (from Egypt), Jan Rypka (from Czechoslovakia), Dodikhudo Saymiddinov (from Tajikistan), Muhammadjon Shakuri (from Tajikistan), and Syed Waheed Ashraf (from India).

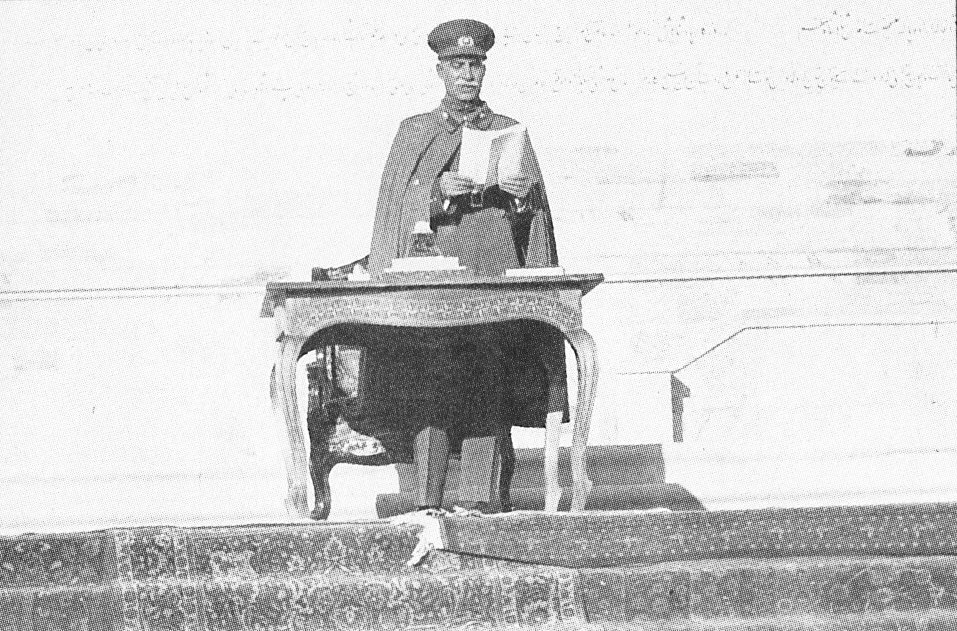
Reza Shah officially dedicating the Tomb of Ferdowsi upon conclusion of the Ferdowsi Millenary Celebration

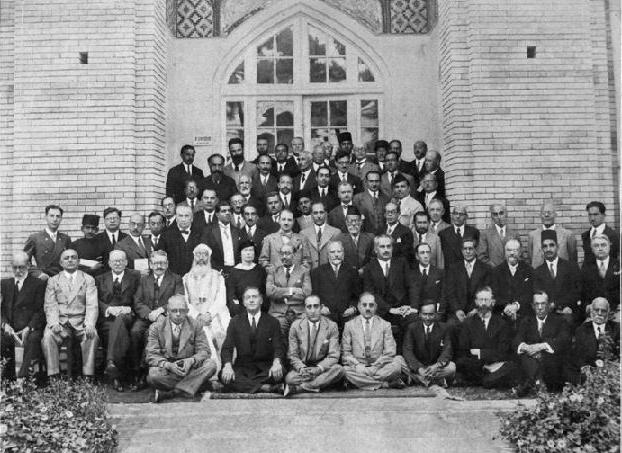
Participants of the Ferdowsi Millenary Congress in Tehran

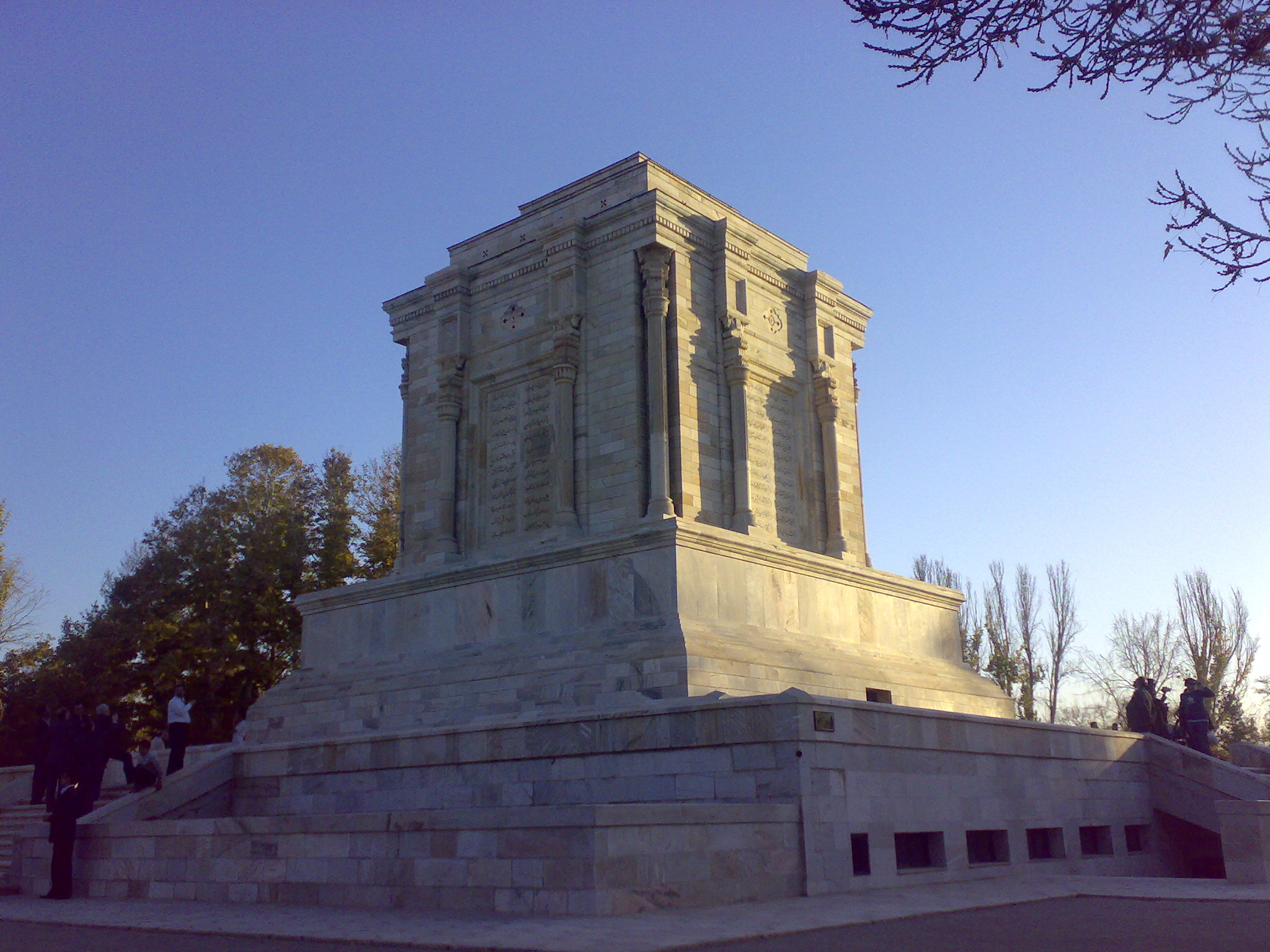
The Tomb of Ferdowsi in Tus, Iran

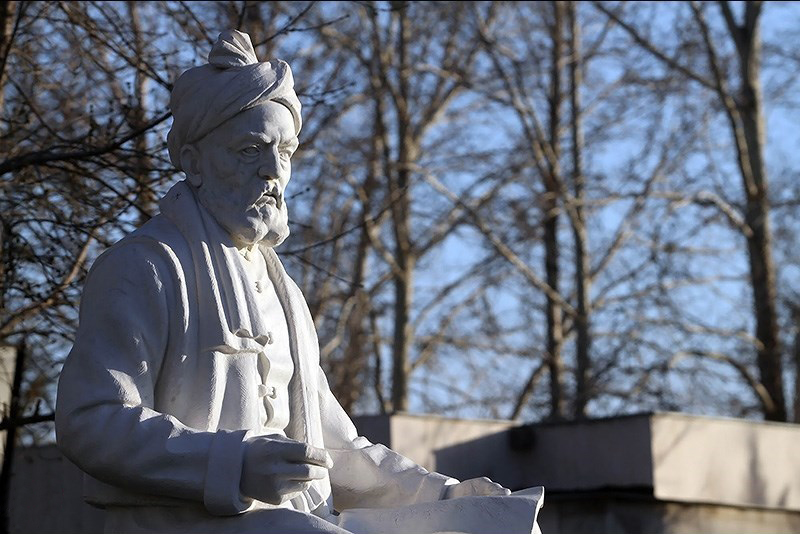
The statue of Ferdowsi in Tus, Iran

The academy was a key institution in the struggle to re-build Iran as a nation-state after the end of the Qajar era. During the 1930s and 1940s, the academy led successful campaigns replacing the loanwords used during the Qajar era.

== Functions ==
The academy strives to protect the integrity of the Persian language. It heads the academic efforts for linguistic research on the Persian language and its sister Iranian languages. It has also created an official orthography of Persian.

The attention of the academy has also been towards the persistent infiltration of Persian, like many other languages, with foreign words, as a result of the globalisation process. The academy constantly campaigns for the use of Persian equivalents of new loanwords. If no equivalents exist, it has the task of linguistically deriving such words from existing Persian roots, and promoting the adoption of these new coinages in the daily lives. The Iranian law requires those equivalents to be used in the official media, governmental affairs, and product management of all companies.

== Encyclopedia of Persian language and literature ==
The Encyclopedia of Persian Language and Literature in South Asia (India, Pakistan and Bangladesh) was established in 1993 in order to compile the Encyclopedia of Persian Language and Literature in South Asia.

== Membership ==
The academy members are selected from masters of Persian literature and linguistics. After the 1979 Iranian Revolution, Hassan Habibi was appointed as the academy's president, and he remained in that position until his death in 2013. The current president is Gholam-Ali Haddad-Adel.

The following is a list of both living and deceased permanent members of the academy since the 1979 Revolution.

=== Permanent members ===
==== Current ====
- Gholam-Ali Haddad-Adel (president)
- Houshang Moradi Kermani
- Mohammad Dabir Moghaddam
- Mehdi Mohaghegh
- Nasrollah Pourjavady
- Mohammad Jafar Yahaghi

==== Deceased ====
- Abdolmohammad Ayati
- Abolhassan Najafi
- Qeysar Aminpour
- Mohammad Taqi Danesh Pajouh
- Hassan Habibi (former president)
- Muhammadjon Shakuri (from Tajikistan)
- Ahmad Tafazzoli

== Proclamation on language name ==
On 19 November 2005, the Academy of the Persian Language and Literature delivered a pronouncement on the name of the Persian language, rejecting any use of the word Farsi (instead of English Persian, German Persisch, Spanish persa, French persan, etc.) in foreign languages.

The announcement reads:

1. Persian has been used in a variety of publications including cultural, scientific, and diplomatic documents for centuries and, therefore, it carries a very significant historical and cultural meaning. Hence, changing Persian to Farsi would negate this established important precedent.
2. Changing the usage from Persian to Farsi may give the impression that "Farsi" is a new language and not the same as Persian, although this may well be the intention of some users of Farsi.
3. Changing the usage may also give the impression that "Farsi" is a dialect used in some parts of Iran rather than the predominant and official language of the country.

Supporting this announcement, gradually other institutions and literary figures separately took similar actions throughout the world.

== See also ==
- Iranian studies
- Persian studies
- Academy of Sciences of Afghanistan
- Rudaki Institute of Language and Literature (Tajikistan)
