= List of countries and territories where Persian is an official language =

The following is a list of sovereign states that have Persian as an official language.

Persian Linguasphere Legend Official language (Iran, Afghanistan, Tajikistan) More than 1,000,000 speakers (Uzbekistan, Pakistan, Russia, United States) Between 500,000–1,000,000 speakers (Turkey, United Arab Emirates, Iraq) Between 100,000–500,000 speakers (Qatar, Saudi Arabia, Germany, Australia, Israel, United Kingdom, Sweden, Bahrain, India, Canada, Kuwait) Between 25,000–100,000 speakers (Oman, France, Syria, Japan, Kyrgyzstan, Yemen, Kazakhstan, Netherlands, Armenia, Austria, China, Turkmenistan, Italy, Finland, Spain, Norway) Fewer than 25,000 speakers

== Official language ==
Countries and territories where Persian is a de jure official language
Country	Persian variety	Region	Total population	Persian speakers	
Country	Persian variety	Region	Total population	L1	Total
Iran	Farsi	West Asia	83,783,945	50,568,000	~70,000,000
Afghanistan	Dari	Central Asia	32,890,171	16,650,000	~30,000,000
Tajikistan	Tajik	Central Asia	9,313,800	6,373,834	~9,300,000
Dagestan, Russia	Tat	Eastern Europe	3,132,268	2,010	~2,100
Total			129,020,184	73,593,834	109,300,000

== Significant minority language ==
Countries where Persian is a significant minority language
Country	Region	Population	Persian speakers	
Country	Region	Population	Population	Percentage
Uzbekistan	Central Asia	34,412,349	1,544,700–10,000,000	4.8–30%
Bahrain	West Asia	1,592,000	100,000	14%

Other countries with significant numbers of Persian speakers
Country	Region	Population	Persian speakers	
Country	Region	Population	Population	Percentage
Pakistan	South Asia	227,000,000	1,000,000–1,500,000	0.44-0.66%

== Historical language ==
=== Indian subcontinent ===
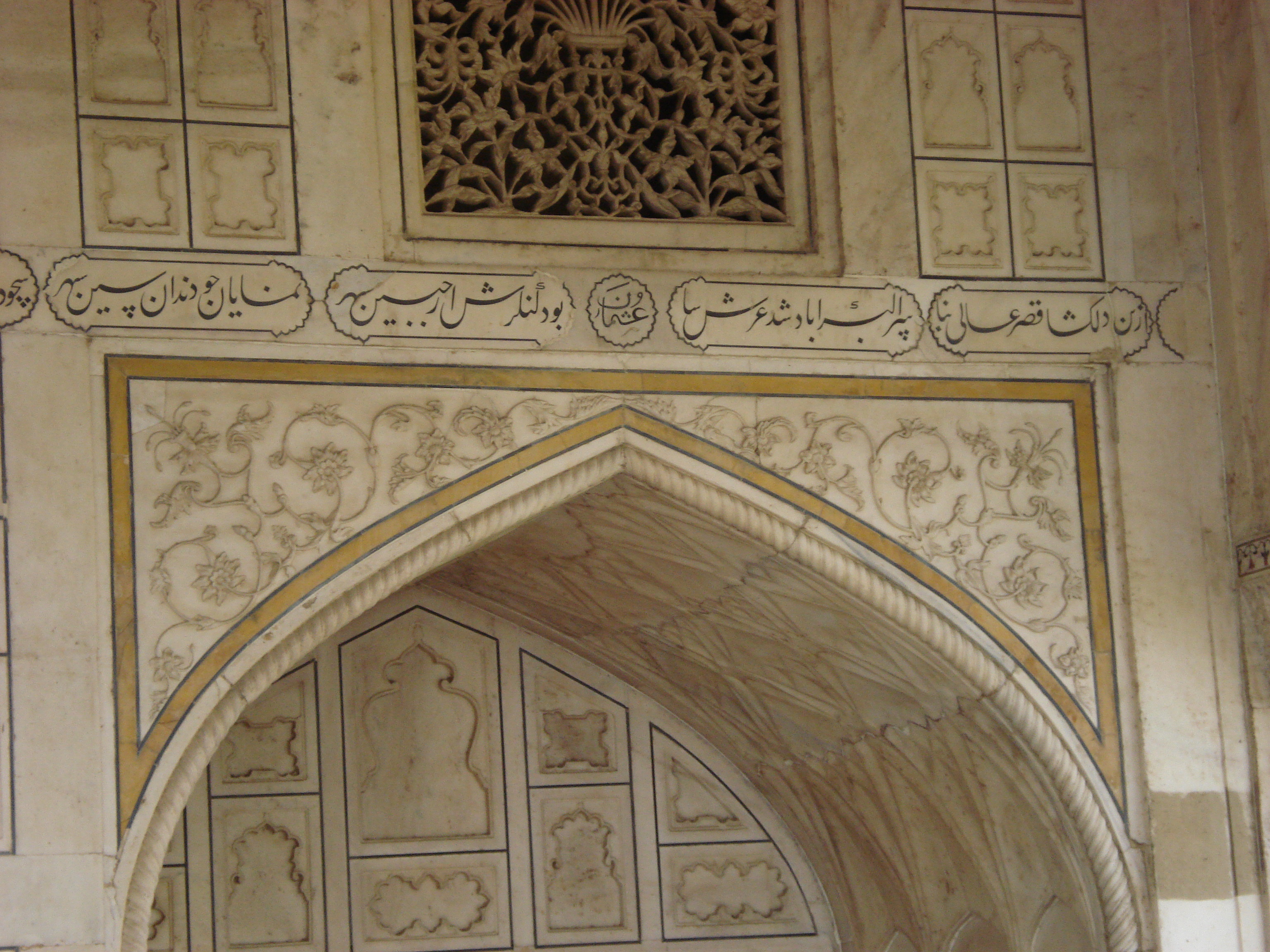
Persian poems in Taj Mahal

Before the British colonised the Indian subcontinent, Persian was the region's lingua franca and a widely used official language in what are now north India and Pakistan. The language was brought into the region by various Turkic, Persian and Afghan dynasties, in particular the Turko-Afghan Delhi Sultanate and the Mughal Dynasty. Persian held official status in the court and the administration within these empires and it heavily influenced many of the local languages, particularly Urdu and to some extent modern standard Hindi.

Evidence of Persian's historical influence there can be seen in the extent of its influence on the languages of the Indian subcontinent. Many of these areas have seen a certain influence by Persian not only in literature but also in the speech of the common man. Persian exerted a strong influence on Balochi (an Iranian language) and Urdu, and a relatively strong influence on Pashto (another Iranian language), Punjabi and Sindhi. Other languages like Hindi, Marathi, Gujarati, Kashmiri and Bengali also have a considerable amount of loan words from Persian.

Persian's official status was replaced with English in 1835 by British East India Company. After 1843, Hindustani and English gradually replaced Persian in importance in the Indian subcontinent as the British had full suzerainty over the Indian subcontinent.

=== Ottoman Empire ===
Persian was one of the influential languages of the Ottoman Empire along with Ottoman Turkish and Arabic. It was initially used by the educated in northern portions of the Ottoman Empire before being displaced by Ottoman Turkish. Throughout the vast Ottoman bureaucracy Ottoman Turkish language was the official language, a version of Turkish, albeit with a vast mixture of both Arabic and Persian grammar and vocabulary. Educated Ottoman Turks spoke Arabic and Persian, as these were the main foreign languages in the pre-Tanzimat era, with the former being used for science and the latter for literary affairs.

The spread of the Persian language through Rumi shrines made it the dialect of the Sufism. The Ottomans promoted and supported the Persian language. The reborn evolution of the Persian etymology and its impact on the Turks’ literature and culture reached perfection in the Ottoman Royal Court and the Sufis’ Khanqahs. Sultan Bayezid II (1448- 1512), was in correspondence with the divines and the men of letters of Khorasan, including the poet Jami.

== See also ==
- List of countries and territories where Arabic is an official language
- Geolinguistics
- Language geography

By ISO 639-3 code
Enter an ISO code to find the corresponding language article.
