= Academy of Sciences of Afghanistan =

Afghanistan Science Academy
- Pashto: د افغانستان د علومو اکاډمي; Persian: اکادمی علوم افغانستان

Government agency overview
- Formed: 1978; 48 years ago
- Jurisdiction: Afghanistan
- Government agency executive: Shaykh-ul-Hadith Farid-ud-Din Mahmood, President

The Afghanistan Science Academy (ASA) (Pashto: د افغانستان د علومو اکاډمي, Persian: اکادمی علوم افغانستان) is the official government agency of Afghanistan that regulates the Pashto and Dari languages spoken in Afghanistan.

The Academy was founded in 1978 by Dr. Gul Mohammed Noorzai, a historian, writer, and linguist as a result of the merging of older academic associations. The Academy has more than 300 research fellows, divided into three main groups: social science, natural sciences, and Islamic studies.

During years of civil war many research institutes in Afghanistan have been destroyed. The ASA building as well lacks adequate infrastructure, laboratories, equipment and libraries.

== Presidents ==
- Abdul Bari Rashid, PhD (2002–2013)
- suraya popal, professor (2013–2018)
- Abdul Zahir Shakib, PhD (2018–2021)
- Farid-ud-Din Mahmood, Shaykh al-Hadith (November 2021–Present)

== Members ==
- Abdul Shakoor Rashad, Professor (? – 2004?)

== See also ==
- Academy of Persian Language and Literature
- Rudaki Institute of Language and Literature
- Pashto Academy
