= Esfahani accent =

Dialect of modern Persian spoken in Esfahan Province

Esfahani Persian
- Esfahani Accent, Esfahani Dialect
- لهجه اصفهانی, گویش اصفهانی
- Pronunciation: Pārsi-e Esfāhāni, Pārsi-e Esfehuni
- Native to: Iran
- Region: Isfahan Province
- Language family: Indo-European: Indo-Iranic; Iranic; Western Iranic; Southwestern Iranic; Persian; Iranian Persian; Esfahani Persian
- Writing system: Persian alphabet

Language codes
- ISO 639-3: –
- Glottolog: esfa1238

The Esfahani accent (Persian: لهجه اصفهانی), or Esfahani dialect (گویش اصفهانی), is a dialect of Persian spoken in Isfahan.

== Phonology ==
The following are phonological differences between Esfahani and Standard Iranian Persian:

- Voicing assimilation of /q/:
  - Example: /ta:qtʃe/ ↔ [taxtʃe] 'shelf'
- Vowel lengthening before the loss of glottal consonants /ʔ/ and /h/, as well as /w/:
  - Examples: /baʔzi/ ↔ [baːzi] 'some'; /maʔreke/ ↔ [maːreke] 'crowd of people'
- Lenition of /d/ before /r/ to /z/:
  - Examples: /tʃeqadr/ ↔ [tʃeqaz] 'how much/how many?'
- Voicing dissimilation:
  - Example: /vaqt/ ↔ [vaxd] 'time'
- Final devoicing:
  - Example: /ziyaːd/ ↔ [ziyaːt] 'much/many'
- Vowel raising before nasal consonants:
  - Examples: /xaːnom/ ↔ [xaːnum] 'lady'; /xaːne/ ↔ [xune] 'lady'
