= Iranian Persian =

Variety of Persian language

- Western Persian
- فارسی ایرانی (Fârsi-ye Irâni)
- Fārsi written in Persian calligraphy (Nastaʿlīq)
- Pronunciation: [fɒːɾˈsiːje ʔiː.ɹɒːˈníː]
- Native to: Iran
- Region: West Asia
- Ethnicity: Persians
- Speakers: L1: 65 million (2023); L2: 17 million (2021); Total: 83 million (2021–2023)
- Language family: Indo-European: Indo-Iranian; Iranian; Western; Southwestern Iranian; Persian; Iranian Persian
- Dialects: Bushehri; Abadani; Araki; Bandari; Basseri; Esfahani; Karbalai; Kashani; Kermani; Kermanshahi; Kuwaiti; Mashhadi; Qazvini; Shirazi; Sistani; Tehrani; Yazdi
- Writing system: Persian script

Official status
- Official language in: Iran
- Regulated by: Academy of Persian Language and Literature

Language codes
- ISO 639-3: pes
- Glottolog: west2369

Iranian Persian (فارسی ایرانی, Fârsi-ye Irâni; Iranian Persian pronunciation: [fɒːɾˈsiːje ʔiː.ɹɒːˈníː]), Western Persian or Western Farsi, is the variety of the Persian language spoken in Iran and by others in neighboring countries, as well as by Iranian communities throughout the world. These are intelligible with other varieties of Persian, including Afghanistan's Dari and Tajikistan's Tajik. When contrasted with Dari and Tajik, it is often simply referred to as Farsi (فارسی, Fârsi).

Iranian Persian serves as the predominant and official spoken language in Iran, with 61.5 million mother tongue speakers in 2023 and 17.2 million second language speakers in 2021.

== Name ==
Iran's national language has been called, apart from Persian or Farsi, by names such as Iranian Persian, Western Persian and Western Farsi, exclusively. Officially, the national language of Iran is designated simply as Persian (فارسی, Fârsi).

=== ISO code ===
The international language-encoding standard ISO 639-1 uses the code fa for the Persian language in general, as its coding system is mostly based on the native-language designations. The more detailed standard ISO 639-3 uses the code fas for the dialects spoken across Iran and Afghanistan. This consists the individual varieties of Dari Persian and Iranian Persian. The code pes is used for Iranian Persian, exclusively.

=== Announcement of the Academy about the name of the Persian language in foreign languages ===
On November 19, 2005, the Academy of Persian Language and Literature delivered a pronouncement on the name of the Persian language, rejecting any use of the word Farsi (instead of English Persian, German Persisch, Spanish persa, French persan, etc.) in foreign languages.

The announcement reads:

1. Persian has been used in a variety of publications including cultural, scientific, and diplomatic documents for centuries and, therefore, it carries a very significant historical and cultural meaning. Hence, changing Persian to Farsi would negate this established important precedent.
2. Changing the usage from Persian to Farsi may give the impression that "Farsi" is a new language, although this may well be the intention of some users of the term Farsi.
3. Changing the usage may also give the impression that "Farsi" is a dialect used in some parts of Iran rather than the predominant and official language of the country.
4. The word Farsi has never been used in any research paper or university document in any Western language, and the proposal to begin using it would create doubt and ambiguity about the name of the official language of Iran.

Supporting this announcement, gradually other institutions and literary figures separately took similar actions throughout the world.

== History ==
The main dynamics of the linguistic evolution of modern Iranian Persian are political and social changes, such as the advancement of particular regions. In Iran, the Safavid period in particular initiated several sociolinguistic changes that shaped the country's national language, reflecting the political and ideological separation of Iran from Central Asia and Afghanistan. The multiple relocations of the capital city of Iran likely influenced the development of a distinctive metropolitan sociolect that would become the dominant Persian dialect throughout the country.

During the late 12th and late 15th or early 17th centuries in Iran, the vowel repertory of the Persian language evolved and a few consonants were modified in most of Iran's Western Persian dialects (most likely driven by neighboring Iranian languages such as Mazandarani), while these features have remained the same in the Eastern Persian dialects of Dari and Tajik.

Overall, Iran's Western Persian dialects appear to have evolved more consistently in lexicon and phonology than the Eastern Persian dialects of Afghanistan and Central Asia.

== Comparison with other varieties ==
There are some phonological, lexical, and morphological differences between the Western Persian dialects of Iran, and the Eastern Persian dialects of Afghanistan and Central Asia, particularly in their spoken forms. However, these differences consist mainly of pronunciation, vocabulary, and a few syntactic features. There are no differences in the written forms of Iran's standard Persian and Afghanistan's standard Dari, other than some regional idiomatic phrases.

The dialects of Dari spoken in Northern, Central and Eastern Afghanistan, for example in Kabul, Mazar, and Badakhshan, have distinct features compared to Iran's Standard Persian. However, the dialect of Dari spoken in Western Afghanistan stands in between Dari and Iranian Persian. For instance, the Herati dialect shares huge vocabulary and phonology similarities with Iranian Persian.

The Tehrani dialect is the standard model of Persian in Iran, as is the Kabuli dialect in relation to the Persian in Afghanistan.

=== Phonology ===
The following are the primary phonological differences between Iran's standard Persian and the Persian dialects of Afghanistan and Tajikistan (Dari and Tajik), as well as Classical Persian.

1. Most varieties of Persian spoken in Iran merge the so-called "majhul" vowels. The "majhul" vowels /eː/ and /oː/ are merged into /iː/ and /uː/ respectively in Iran's Standard Persian, whereas in Dari and Tajik, they are kept separate. For instance, the words for "lion" and "milk", which are written identically as شیر in Persian script and respectively as шер and шир in Tajik script, are both pronounced /ʃiːr/ in Iran's Standard Persian, while Dari uses /ʃeːr/ and /ʃiːr/ and Tajik uses /ʃer/ and /ʃir/ for "lion" and "milk", respectively. The long vowel in زود /zuːd/ meaning "quick" and زور /zuːr/ meaning "strong" is realized as /uː/ in Iran's Standard Persian, whereas these words are pronounced /zuːd/ and /zoːr/ respectively in Dari.
2. The early Classical Persian diphthongs /aw/ (as "ow" in English "cow") and /aj/ (as "i" in English "ice") are pronounced [ow] (as "o" in English "cold") and [ej] (as in English "day") in the Standard Persian of Iran. For instance, the word Nowruz (نوروز in Persian, Наврӯз in Tajik) is realized as /nowruːz/ in Iran's Standard Persian and /nawroːz/ in Standard Dari, and نخیر meaning "no" is /næχejr/ in Iran's Standard Persian and /naχajr/ in Standard Dari. In colloquial Iranian speech, [ow] is often simplified to [oː]. This does not occur in Dari or Tajik.
3. The high short vowels /i/ and /u/ tend to be lowered in the Standard Persian of Iran to [e] and [o], while in Dari and Tajik they might have both high and lowered allophones.
4. The pronunciation of the Classical Persian bilabial consonant [w] is realized as a voiced labiodental fricative [v] in both Iran's Standard Persian and Tajikistan's Standard Tajik, whereas Afghanistan's Standard Dari realizes the sound as a bilabial [w]. In Dari, [v] never appears but the similar sounding [β] may appear among some speakers as an allophone of /f/ before voiced consonants or as a variant of /b/.
5. The voiced uvular plosive ([ɢ]; ق in Persian, қ in Tajik) and the voiced velar fricative ([ɣ]; غ in Persian, ғ in Tajik) are merged as one in Iran's Standard Persian, whereas they are treated as separate phonemes in Dari and Tajik.
6. The short final "a" (ه-) is normally realized as [e] in Iran's Standard Persian, with the exception of the word nah and dah meaning "no" and "ten" respectively.
  - This means that [a] and [e] in word-final positions are separate in Dari but not in Iran's Standard Persian, where [e] is the word-final allophone of /æ/ in almost all cases.
7. The short non-final "a" is realized as [æ] in Iran's Standard Persian.
