= Dari =

Eastern variety of Persian

- Afghan Persian, Eastern Persian
- دری
- Dari in Perso-Arabic script (Nastaʿlīq style)
- Pronunciation: [d̪ɐˈɾiː]
- Native to: Afghanistan
- Speakers: L1: 15 million (2024); L2: 18 million (2023); Total: 33 million (2023–2024)
- Language family: Indo-European: Indo-Iranian; Iranian; Western Iranian; Southwestern Iranian; Persian; Dari
- Dialects: Southeastern (incl. Kabuli); Western (incl. Aimaq); Central (incl. Hazaragi); Southwestern (incl. Sistani) (Note: Sistani is subsumed as part of the Western varieties of Persian by Afghanistan's Ministry of Education and Takhar University, but considered a distinct dialect by the Encyclopædia Iranica.)
- Writing system: Persian alphabet

Official status
- Official language in: Afghanistan
- Regulated by: Academy of Sciences of Afghanistan

Language codes
- ISO 639-3: prs
- Glottolog: dari1249

Dari, (Note: /ˈdɑːri, ˈdæri/ DAHR-ee, DARR-ee) (Note: دری, Darī, Dari pronunciation: [d̪ɐˈɾiː]) also known as Farsi Dari, (Note: فارسی دری, Fārsī-yi Darī, Dari pronunciation: [fɑːɾˈsiːjɪ d̪ɐˈɾiː]) Dari Persian, Eastern Persian, (Note: Along with Tajik) or Afghan Persian, is the variety of the Persian language spoken in Afghanistan. Dari is the Afghan government's official term for the Persian language; it is referred to as Afghan Persian or Eastern Persian in many Western sources. The decision to rename the local variety of Persian in 1964 was more political than linguistic to support an Afghan state narrative. Dari Persian is most closely related to Tajiki Persian as spoken in Tajikistan and the two share many phonological and lexical similarities. Apart from a few basics of vocabulary, there is little difference between formal written Persian of Afghanistan and Iran; the languages are mutually intelligible. Dari is the official language for approximately 30.6 million people in Afghanistan and it serves as the common language for inter-ethnic communication in the country.

As defined in the 2004 Constitution of Afghanistan, Dari is one of the two official languages of Afghanistan; the other is Pashto. Dari is the most widely spoken language in Afghanistan and the native language of approximately 25–50% of the population. Dari serves as the lingua franca of the country and is understood by up to 78% of the population.

Dari Persian served as the preferred literary and administrative language among non-native speakers, such as the Turco-Mongol peoples including the Mughals, for centuries before the rise of modern nationalism. Also, similar to Iranian Persian and Tajiki Persian, Dari Persian is a continuation of Middle Persian, the official religious and literary language of the Sasanian Empire (224–651 AD), itself a continuation of Old Persian, the language of the Achaemenids (550–330 BC). In historical usage, Dari refers to the Middle Persian court language of the Sassanids.

== Etymology ==
Dari is a name given to the New Persian language since the 10th century, widely used in Arabic (compare Istakhri, Al-Maqdisi and Ibn Hawqal) and Persian texts.

Since 1964, it has been the official name in Afghanistan for the Persian spoken there. In Afghanistan, Dari refers to a modern dialect form of Persian that is the standard language used in administration, government, radio, television, and print media. Because of a preponderance of Dari native speakers, who normally refer to the language as Farsi (فارسی, "Persian"), it is also known as "Afghan Persian" in some Western sources.

There are different opinions about the origin of the word Dari. The majority of scholars believe that Dari refers to the Persian word dar (در) or darbār (دربار), meaning 'court', as it was the formal language of the Sassanids. The original meaning of the word dari is given in a notice attributed to Ibn al-Muqaffa' (cited by Ibn al-Nadim in Al-Fihrist). According to him, Pārsī was the language spoken by priests, scholars, and the like; it is the language of Fars." This language refers to Middle Persian. As for Dari, he says, "it is the language of the cities of Al-Mada'in; it is spoken by those who are at the king's court. [Its name] is connected with presence at court. Among the languages of the people of Khorasan and the east, the language of the people of Balkh is predominant."

Dari Persian spoken in Afghanistan is not to be confused with the language of Iran called Zoroastrian Dari (also known as "Behdinani", or sometimes pejoratively referred to as "Gabri" or "Gavruni"), which is a language of the central Iranian subgroup spoken in some Zoroastrian communities.

== History ==
Dari comes from Middle Persian, which was spoken during the rule of the Sassanid dynasty. In general, Iranian languages are known from three periods, usually referred to as Old, Middle, and New (Modern) periods. These correspond to three eras in Iranian history, the Old Era being the period from some time before, during, and after the Achaemenid period (that is, to 300 BCE), the Middle Era being the next period, namely, the Sassanid period and part of the post-Sassanid period, and the New Era being the period afterwards down to the present day.

The first person in Europe to use the term Deri for Dari may have been Thomas Hyde in his chief work, Historia religionis veterum Persarum (1700).

Dari or Deri has two meanings. It may mean the language of the court:

"the Zebani Deri (Zeban i Deri or Zaban i Dari = the language of Deri), or the language of the court, and the Zebani Farsi, the dialect of Persia at large (...)"

It may also indicate a form of poetry used from Rudaki to Jami. In the fifteenth century it appeared in Herat under the Persian-speaking Timurid dynasty. The Persian-language poets of the Indian subcontinent who used the Indian verse methods or rhyme methods, such as Abdul-Qādir Bēdil and Muhammad Iqbal, became familiar with the araki form of poetry. Iqbal loved both styles of literature and poetry, when he wrote:

گرچه هندی در عذوبت شکر است

garči Hindī dar 'uẕūbat šakkar ast

طرز گفتار دری شیرین‌تر است

tarz-i guftār-i Darī šīrēn-tar ast

This can be translated as:

Even though in euphonious Hindi (Note: lit. 'language of India'. Not to be confused with Modern Standard Hindi; in fact, in this case, it's an archaic name used for Rekhta/Urdu.) is sugar –
(But) the rhyme method in Dari (Note: lit. 'the courtly language'. Here, not referring to the variety of Persian used in Afghanistan.) is sweeter.

'Uẕūbat usually means 'bliss', 'delight', 'sweetness'; in language, literature and poetry, 'uẕūbat also means 'euphonious' or 'melodic'.

Hafez, the 14th-century Persian poet, referencing Bengal: (Note: This verse is often partially attributed to Sultan Ghiyasuddin Azam Shah, but doubt has been cast on the historicity of such a claim.)

شکرشکن شوند همه طوطیان هند

šakkar-šikan šawand hama ṭūṭiyān-i Hind

زین قند پارسی که به بنگاله می‌رود

zēn qand-i Pārsī ki ba Bangāla mē-rawad

English translation:

All the parrots of India have started crushing sugar
Through this Persian candy which is going to Bengal.

Here qand-i Pārsī ('Rock candy of Persia') is a metaphor for the Persian language and poetry.

Persian replaced the Central Asian languages of the Eastern Iranic peoples. Farghana, Samarqand, and Bukhara were starting to be influenced by Dari, and were originally Khwarezmian- and Sogdian-speaking areas during Samanid rule. Dari Persian spread around the Amu Darya region, Afghanistan, and Khorasan after the Arab conquests and during Islamic-Arab rule. The replacement of the Pahlavi script with the Arabic script in order to write the Persian language was done by the Tahirids in 9th century Khorasan. Dari Persian spread and led to the extinction of Eastern Iranian languages such as Bactrian and Khwarezmian with only a tiny amount of Sogdian descended Yaghnobi speakers remaining, as the ancestors of Tajiks started speaking Dari after relinquishing their original language (most likely Bactrian) around this time, due to the fact that the Arab-Islamic army which invaded Central Asia also included some Persians who governed the region like the Sassanids. Persian was a prestigious high-ranking language and was further rooted into Central Asia by the Samanids. Persian also phased out Sogdian. The role of lingua franca that Sogdian originally played was succeeded by Persian after the arrival of Islam.

== Distribution ==
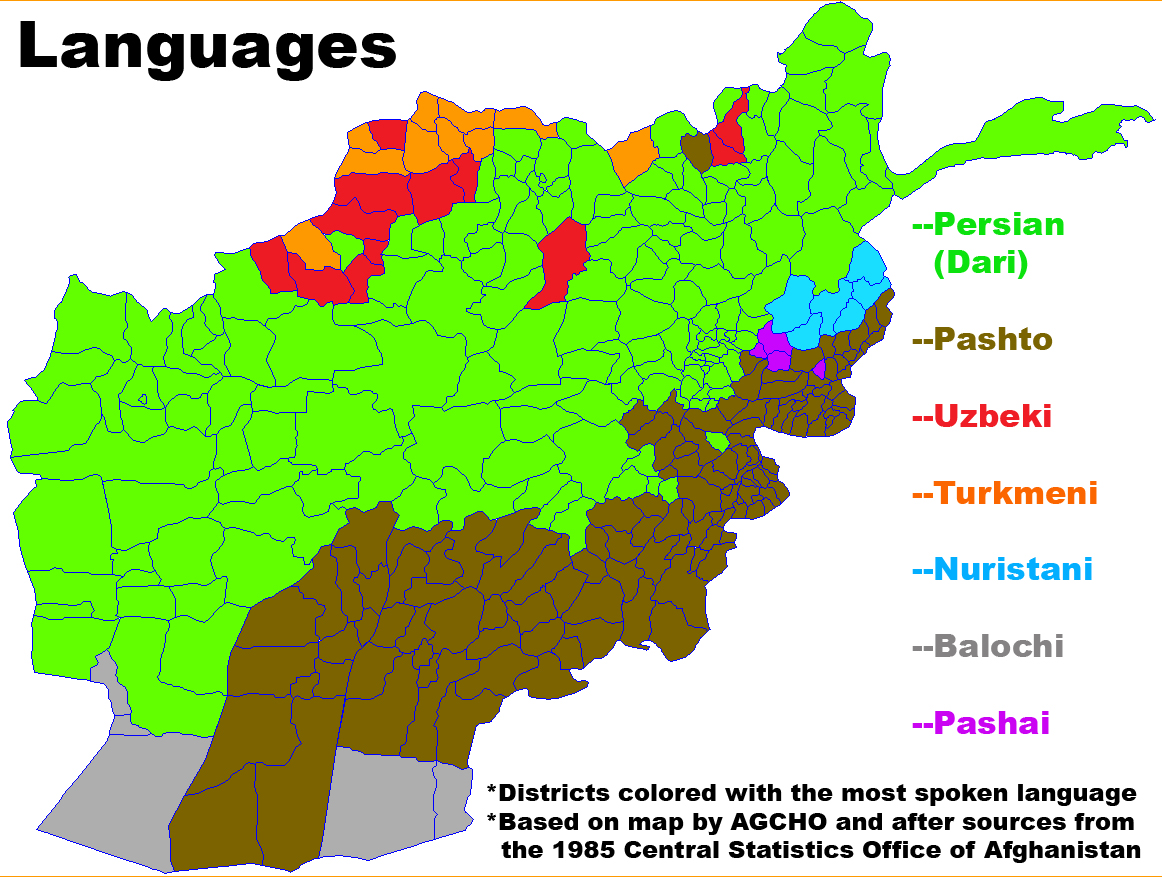
Majority Dari Persian speaking regions of Afghanistan in green

Dari is one of the two official languages of Afghanistan. In practice, though, it serves as the de facto lingua franca among the various ethnolinguistic groups.

Dari Persian is spoken by approximately 25–80% of the population of Afghanistan. Tajiks, who comprise 27–39% of the population, are the primary native speakers, followed by Hazaras (9%) and Aymāqs (4%). Moreover, while Pashtuns (37–48%) natively speak Pashto, those living in Tajik and Hazara dominated areas also use Dari Persian as their main or secondary language. Thus, non-native Persian-speaking groups have contributed to the increased number of Persian speakers within Afghanistan. The World Factbook states that about 80% of the Afghan population speaks Dari Persian. About 2.5 million Afghans in Iran and Afghans in Pakistan, part of the wider Afghan diaspora, also speak Dari Persian as one of their primary languages.

Dari Persian dominates the northern, western, and central areas of Afghanistan, and is the common language spoken in cities such as Balkh, Mazar-i-Sharif, Herat, Fayzabad, Panjshir, Bamiyan, and the Afghan capital of Kabul where all ethnic groups are settled. Dari Persian-speaking communities also exist in southwestern and eastern Pashtun-dominated areas such as in the cities of Ghazni, Farah, Zaranj, Lashkar Gah, Kandahar, and Gardez.

== Cultural influence ==
Dari Persian has contributed to the majority of Persian borrowings in several Indo-Aryan languages, such as Hindustani (Hindi-Urdu), Punjabi, Bengali, Kashmiri, Gujarati, Sindhi, Saraiki, Hindko, Marathi, etc. and others, as it was the administrative, official, cultural language of the Persianate Mughal Empire and served as the lingua franca throughout the Indian subcontinent for centuries. Often based in Afghanistan, Turkic Central Asian conquerors brought the language into South Asia. The basis in general for the introduction of Persian language into the subcontinent was set, from its earliest days, by various Persianized Central Asian Turkic and Afghan dynasties. The sizable Persian component of the Anglo-Indian loan words in English and in Urdu therefore reflects the Dari Persian pronunciation (see this for more). For instance, the words dopiaza and pyjama come from the anglicisation of the Afghan Persian pronunciation; in Iranian Persian they are pronounced do-piyāzeh and pey-jāmeh. Persian lexemes and certain morphological elements (e.g., the ezāfe) have often been employed to coin words for political and cultural concepts, items, or ideas that were historically unknown outside the Indian subcontinent, as is the case with the aforementioned "borrowings". Dari Persian has a rich and colorful tradition of proverbs that deeply reflect Afghan culture and relationships, as demonstrated through the works of Rumi and other literature.

== Differences between Iranian and Afghan Persian ==
There are phonological, lexical, and morphological differences between Afghan Persian and Iranian Persian. For example, Afghan Farsi has more vowels than Iranian Farsi.

=== Phonological differences ===
The phonology of Dari Persian as spoken in Kabul, compared with Classical Persian, is overall more conservative than the accent of Iran's standard register. In this regard, Dari Persian is more similar to Tajiki Persian. The principal differences between standard Iranian Persian and Afghan Persian, as based on the Kabul dialect, are:

1. The merging of majhūl vowels with ma'rūf vowels (i.e., /eː, iː/ and /oː, uː/ into /iː/ and /uː/ respectively) is a phenomenon in Iranian Persian, whereas in Afghan Persian, they are still kept separate. For instance, the identically written words شیر 'lion' and 'milk' are pronounced the same in Iranian Persian as /ʃiːr/, but differently as /ʃeːr/ for 'lion' and /ʃiːr/ for 'milk' in Afghan Persian, similar to Tajiki Persian. The long vowel in زود "quick" and زور "strength" is realized as /uː/ in Iranian Persian; in contrast, these words are pronounced /zuːd/ and /zoːr/ respectively by Persian speakers in Afghanistan (and Tajikistan).
2. The Classical Persian high short vowels /i/ and /u/ tend to be lowered in Iranian Persian to [e] and [o], unlike in Dari where they might have both high and lowered allophones.
3. The treatment of the diphthongs of early Classical Persian "ay" (as "i" in English "size") and "aw" (as "ow" in Engl. "cow"), which are pronounced [ej] (as in English "day") and [ow] (as in Engl. "low") in Iranian Persian. Dari, on the other hand, is more similar to ancient Persian; e.g. نخیر 'no' is realized as /næχejr/ in Iranian but /naχajr/ in Afghan Persian, and نوروز 'Persian New Year' is /nowruːz/ in Iranian but /nawroːz/ in Afghan Persian. Moreover, [ow] is simplified to [o(ː)] in normal Iranian speech, thereby merging with the lowered Classical short vowel /u/ (see above). This does not occur at all in Afghan Persian.
4. The pronunciation of the labial consonant و, which is realized as a voiced labiodental fricative [v] in standard Iranian, is still pronounced with the classical bilabial pronunciation [w] in Afghanistan; [v] is found in Afghan Persian as an allophone of /f/ before voiced consonants and as a variation of /b/ in some cases, along with [β].
5. The convergence of the voiceless uvular stop [q] (ق) and the voiced velar fricative [ɣ] (غ) in some dialects of western Iranian (especially that of Tehran) Persian (presumably under the influence of Turkic languages such as Azeri and Turkmen) is absent in Dari (as well as in Tajik, and even in eastern Iran), where the two are still kept separate.
6. [a] and [i]~[ɪ] in word-final positions are distinguished in Dari, whereas [e] (variant of [i]) is a word-final allophone of /æ/ in Iranian Persian.

=== Dialect continuum ===
The dialects of Dari spoken in Northern, Central, and Eastern Afghanistan, for example in Kabul, Mazar, and Badakhshan, have distinct features compared to Iranian Persian. However, the dialect of Dari spoken in Western Afghanistan stands between the Afghan and Iranian Persian. For instance, the Herati dialect shares vocabulary and phonology with both Afghan and Iranian Persian. Likewise, the dialect of Persian in Eastern Iran, for instance in Mashhad, is quite similar to the Herati dialect of Afghanistan.

== Dialects ==
In a paper jointly published by Takhar University and the Ministry of Education in 2018, researchers studying varieties of Persian from Iran to Tajikistan identified 3 dialect groups (or macro dialects) present within Afghanistan. In an article about various languages spoken in Afghanistan, Encyclopaedia Iranica identified a nearly identical categorization but considered varieties spoken in the Sistan region to constitute a distinct group.

Takhar and the MOE only discussed vocabulary differences between the dialect groups and did not extensively discuss phonological differences between these groups. However, there was a noticeable difference in the romanizations of the Western dialects and the South-Eastern dialects. Chiefly, the vowel diacritic "pesh" (kasra) was romanized with an "i" for South-Eastern dialects but as an "e" for Western dialects. This is presumably due to a difference in quality; however, the paper itself did not explain why the vowels were transliterated differently.

=== Southeastern/Kabuli ===
The Southeastern group constitutes dialects spoken in and around Kabul, Parwan, Balkh, Baghlan, Samangan, Kunduz, Takhar, Badakhshan and others. A distinctive character of this group is its conservative nature compared to, for example, the Tehrani dialect. This can be seen in its Phonology (e.g. its preservation of "Majhul" long vowels and "Ma'ruf" short vowels), Morphology and Syntax, and its Lexicon. A further distinction may be made between dialects in and near Kabul and dialects in and near Afghan Turkestan. With dialects near Kabul exhibiting some influences from languages in southern Afghanistan and the Indian subcontinent and dialects in Afghan Turkistan exhibiting more influence from Tajik. All Southeastern varieties exhibited some influence from Uzbek. Despite the Afghanistan Ministry of Education referring to this group as "Southeastern", some of the dialects included are in the north.

As seen in many Hazaragi dialects, certain Eastern Dialects have developed a system of retroflex consonants under pressure from Pashto. They are not widespread, however.

The Kabuli dialect has become the standard model of Dari Persian in Afghanistan, as has the Tehrani dialect in relation to the Persian in Iran. Since the 1940s, Radio Afghanistan has broadcast its Dari programs in Kabuli Dari, which ensured the homogenization between the Kabuli version of the language and other dialects of Dari Persian spoken throughout Afghanistan. Since 2003, the media, especially the private radio and television broadcasters, have carried out their Dari programs using the Kabuli variety.

=== Western/Aimaqi ===
The Western group includes various dialects (especially the Aimaq dialect) spoken in and around: Herat, Badghis, Farah and Ghor (i.e., west of the Hazarajat). Dialects in this group share many features with the dialects of Persian spoken in eastern Iran, and one may make many comparisons between the speech of Herat and Mashhad.

=== Central/Hazaragi ===
The Central group recognized by the Afghanistan Ministry of Education consists of the Hazaragi dialects spoken mostly by the Hazara people. These dialects are spoken throughout Afghanistan, like in the capital city of Kabul. The "Central" label stems from Hazara-majority regions in central Afghanistan. As a group, the Hazaragi dialects are distinguished by the presence of retroflex consonants and distinctive vocabulary. It has been shown that Hazaragi dialects are accurately a group of sub-dialects of Dari and not their own varieties of Persian.

=== Southwestern/Sistani ===
Afghanistan's Ministry of Education does not make a distinction between varieties of the Sistan region and the varieties in the Western group. However, Encyclopædia Iranica does consider the Sistani dialect to constitute its own distinctive group, with notable influences from Balochi.

== Phonology ==
=== Consonants ===
	Labial	Dental/ Alveolar	Post- alveolar	Palatal	Velar	Uvular	Glottal
Nasal	m	n					
Stop/ Affricate	p b	t d	tʃ dʒ		k ɡ	q	(ʔ)
Fricative	f	s z	ʃ ʒ		x ɣ		h
Tap		ɾ					
Approximant		l		j	w		

- Stops /t, d/ are phonetically dental [t̪, d̪].
- A glottal stop /ʔ/ only appears in words of Arabic origin.
- A flap sound /ɾ/ may be realized as a trill sound [r], in some environments, mostly word-final position; otherwise, they contrast between vowels wherein a trill occurs as a result of gemination (doubling) of [ɾ], especially in loanwords of Arabic origin. Only [ɾ] occurs before and after consonants; in word-final position, it is usually a free variation between a flap and a trill when followed by a consonant or a pause, but flap is more common, only flap before vowel-initial words.
- As in many other languages, /n/ is realized as bilabial [m] before bilabial stops (i.e., /p, b/), as velar [ŋ] before velar stops (i.e., /k, ɡ/), and uvular [ɴ] before uvular stops (i.e., /q/).
- /f/ is (often) voiced to [v] before voiced consonants.
- /w/ is (almost) always voiced as [w], as in Middle Persian.

=== Vowels ===
Standard vowel system
	Front		Back	
	long	short	short	long
Close	ـِی iː	ـِ ,ـِه ɪ ~ (ɛ)	ـُ ,ـُه ,ـُو ʊ ~ (ɔ)	ـُو uː
Mid	ـی eː	ـِ ,ـِه ɪ ~ (ɛ)	ـُ ,ـُه ,ـُو ʊ ~ (ɔ)	ـو oː
Open		ـَ ,ـَه a ~ æ		آ, ـا ,ـٰى ɑː

- Vowel length in Dari is generally perceptible in the urban dialects (especially in Kabul), but rural dialects tend to emphasize quality instead.
- Dari does not distinguish [ɪ] and [ɛ] in any position; these are distinct phonemes in English but are in unconditional free variation in nearly all dialects of Dari. There are no environmental factors related to the appearance of [ɪ] or [ɛ] and native Dari speakers do not perceive them as different phonemes (that is to say, the English words bet [bɛt] and bit [bɪt] would be nearly indistinguishable to a native Dari speaker). However, speakers in urban regions of Kabul, Panjshir and other nearby provinces in southern and eastern Afghanistan tend to realize the vowel as [ɪ]. Speakers of Dari in central Afghanistan (i.e. Hazaragi speakers) tend to realize the vowel in proximity to, or identically to, [i], unless the following syllable contains a high-back vowel. Speakers in western Afghanistan (such as in the Herat or Farah province) and some rural regions in the Kabul province (not the city) most commonly realize the vowel as [ɛ]. Additionally, in some varieties of Dari, the phoneme [ɛ] appears as an allophone of [a].

Palatal	Labial
ـُوی /uːi̯/	-
ـوی /oːi̯/	-
ـای /ɑːi̯/	ـاو /ɑːu̯/
ـَی /ai̯/~/æi̯/	ـَو /au̯/~/æu̯/

- When occurring as lax, the open vowels /a, ɑ/ are raised to [ɐ, ʌ].

== Political views and disputes on the language ==
Successive governments of Afghanistan have promoted New Persian as an official language of government since the time of the Delhi Sultanate (1206–1526), even as those governments were dominated by Pashtuns. Sher Ali Khan of the Barakzai dynasty (1826–1973) first introduced the Pashto language as an additional language of administration. The local name for the Persian variety spoken in Afghanistan was officially changed from Farsi to Dari, meaning "court language" (see Darbar, literally meaning "court"), in 1964. Zaher said there would be, as there are now, two official languages, Pashto and Farsi, though the latter would henceforth be named Dari. Within their respective linguistic boundaries, Dari Persian and Pashto are the media of education.

The term continues to divide opinion in Afghanistan today. While Dari has been the official name for decades, "Farsi" is still the preferred name to many Persian speakers of Afghanistan. Omar Samad, an Afghan analyst and ambassador, says of the dispute:

This debate pits those who look at language as a shared heritage that includes thinkers, writers, and poets of the Farsi language against those who believe that Dari has older roots and provides a distinct identity that cannot be confused with Iran's claim.

== See also ==
- Persian language
- Early New Persian
- Classical Persian
- Persian language in the Indian subcontinent
- Iranian Persian
- Tajik Persian
- Hazaragi dialects
- Languages of Afghanistan
