= Tehrani accent =

Dialect of modern Persian spoken in Tehran Province

Tehrani Persian
- Tehrani Accent, Tehrani Dialect
- لهجهٔ تهرانی, گویش تهرانی
- Pronunciation: Pārsi-e Tehrāni, Pārsi-e Teruni
- Language family: Indo-European: Indo-Iranian; Iranic; Western Iranic; Southwestern Iranic; Persian; Iranian Persian; Tehrani Persian
- Early forms: Old Persian: Middle Persian; Early New Persian
- Writing system: Persian alphabet

Language codes
- ISO 639-3: –
- IETF: pes-u-sd-ir07

The Tehrani accent (Persian: لهجهٔ تهرانی), or Tehrani dialect (گویش تهرانی), is a dialect of Persian spoken in Tehran and the most common colloquial variant of Western Persian. Compared to literary standard Persian, the Tehrani dialect lacks original Persian diphthongs and tends to fuse certain sounds. The Tehrani accent should not be confused with the Old Tehrani dialect, which was a Northwestern Iranian dialect, belonging to the central group.

Some of the words used in the Tehrani accent may derive from the northwestern Iranian language of Razi, such as sūsk "beetle; cockroach", jīrjīrak "cricket", zālzālak "haw(thorn)", and vejīn "weeding".

== History ==
The Tehrani dialect in its current form has existed since the Qajar era and is different from the language of the natives of Tehran; the old Tehrani dialect still exists in areas like Shemiran and Damavand, although it is subject to extinction.

In every part of Tehran, this dialect was influenced by the neighboring cities. The northern regions such as Vanak, Shemiran, and Tajrish had the Mazandarani dialect. The southern regions of Tehran, which are adjacent to the city of Ray, had the Raji (Razi) dialect. The western regions of Tehran towards Karaj were also affected from Tati.

== Differences between Standard Persian and Tehrani dialect ==
Supreme Leader Ali Khamenei speaking in Tehrani accent during the second Khutbah of Tehran Friday Prayer, 18 February 1994.

The following are some of the main differences between colloquial Tehrani Persian and standard Iranian Persian:

- Simplification of some internal consonant clusters:
  - Standard Persian /zd/ ↔ Tehrani /zː/. Example: دزدى /dozdi/ ↔ /dozːi/
  - Standard Persian /st/ ↔ Tehrani /sː/. Examples: دسته /dæste/ ↔ /dæsːe/; پسته /peste/ ↔ /pesːe/
- A number of vowel raising processes and diphthong loss:
  - Standard Persian آم،آن/ɒːn, ɒːm/ ↔ Tehrani /uːn, uːm/. Example: بادام /bɒːdɒːm/ ↔ /bɒːduːm/
  - Standard Persian /e/ ↔ Tehrani [i]. Examples: جگر /dʒegær/ ↔ [dʒigær]; شکار /ʃekɒːr/ ↔ [ʃikɒːr]; کشمش /keʃmeʃ/ ↔ [kiʃmiʃ]
  - The word-final /æ/ in Classical Persian became [e] in modern Tehrani Persian, both colloquial and standard dialects (often romanized as "eh"), meaning [e] is also an allophone of /æ/ in word-final position in modern Tehrani Persian) except for نه [næ] ('no'), but is preserved in the Dari dialects.
  - Standard Persian /ou̯/ ↔ Tehrani [oː]. Examples برو /borou̯/ ↔ [boroː]; نوروز /nou̯ruːz/ ↔ [noːruːz]
- غ and ق denoted the original Arabic phonemes in Classical Persian, the voiced velar fricative [ɣ] and the voiceless uvular stop [q] (pronounced in Persian as voiced uvular stop [ɢ]), respectively. In modern Tehrani Persian (which is used in the Iranian mass media, both colloquial and standard), there is no difference in the pronunciation of غ and ق. Both letters are pronounced as a voiced velar fricative [ɣ] when positioned intervocalically and unstressed, and as a voiced uvular stop [ɢ] otherwise. This allophony is probably influenced by Turkic languages like Azeri and Turkmen. The classic pronunciations of غ and ق are preserved in the eastern variants of Persian (i.e. Dari and Tajiki), as well as in the southern dialects of the modern Iranian variety (e.g. Yazdi and Kermani dialects). Example: دقيقه [dæɢiːˈɢæ] ↔ [dæɣiːˈɣe].
- -e as the 3rd person singular suffix for verbs instead of Standard Persian -ad: می‌خوره ['mi:xoɾe] ↔ می‌خورد ['mi:xoɾæd]
- Use of verbal person suffixes on nominals for the verb بودن [bu:dæn]

Iranians can interchange colloquial Tehrani and standard Persian sociolects in conversational speech.

== Sources ==
- Baghbidi, Hassan Rezai (2016). "The Linguistic History of Rayy up to the Early Islamic Period". Der Islam. 93 (2). De Gruyter: 403–412. doi:10.1515/islam-2016-0034.
