= Kabuli dialect =

Persian dialect of Kabul, Afghanistan

The Kabuli dialect is an eastern Persian dialect spoken in Kabul, Afghanistan, and its surroundings.

As Kabul was for a long time under the rule of dynasties in both Iran (under the Safavids) and India (under the Mughals), who chose Persian as their official language, the Kabuli dialect has enjoyed prominence as a dialect that has been widely spoken for many centuries.

== Sources ==
- Farhadi, R.; Perry, J. R. (2020). "Kāboli". In Yarshater, Ehsan (ed.). Encyclopædia Iranica (Online ed.). Brill. doi:10.1163/2330-4804_EIRO_COM_4180.
