= Gurjars in Punjab =

Ethnic group in larger Punjab region

Punjabi Gujjars
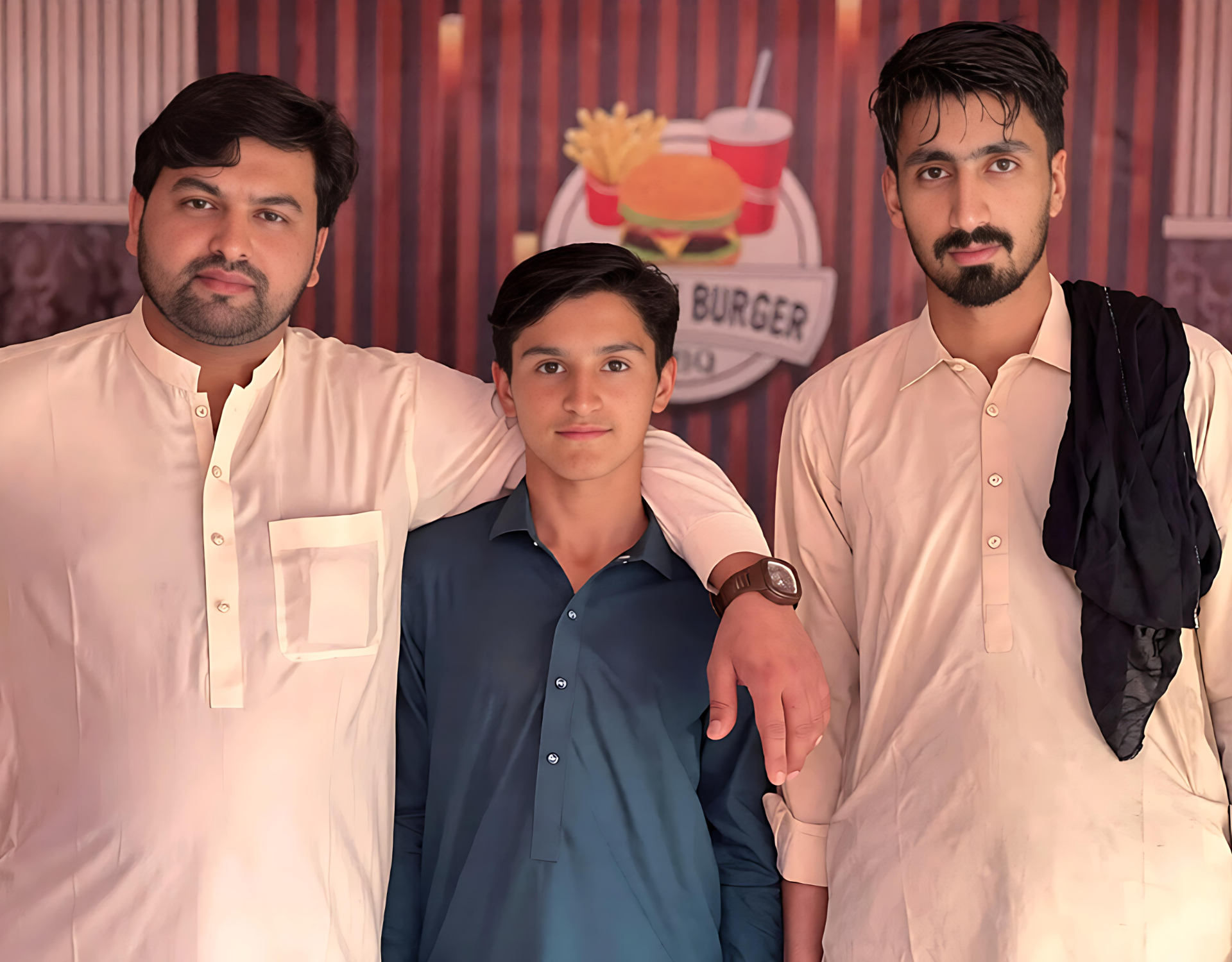
- Two Punjabi Gurjars with a Gurjar boy from Rawalpindi district, Punjab, Pakistan.

Total population
- ~2,737,706 (greater than these estimates) (Note: For Pakistani Punjab population estimates only included for northern Punjab (Pothohar region), and population estimates for central, eastern, and southern Punjab are not included.)

Regions with significant populations
- Pakistan India
- Punjab, Pakistan: 23,00,000 (only for Pothohar/north Punjab)
- Punjab, India: 4,37,706 (1951 census)

Languages
- • Punjabi (Note: Gurjars are a multilingual community in Punjab they speak Punjabi, Gujari, Saraiki, Hindi and Urdu languages.) • Gujari • Saraiki • Urdu • Hindi

Religion
- · Majority: Sunni Islam · Minorities: Hinduism, Sikhism

Related ethnic groups
- Gurjar, Muslim Gurjars, Punjabis
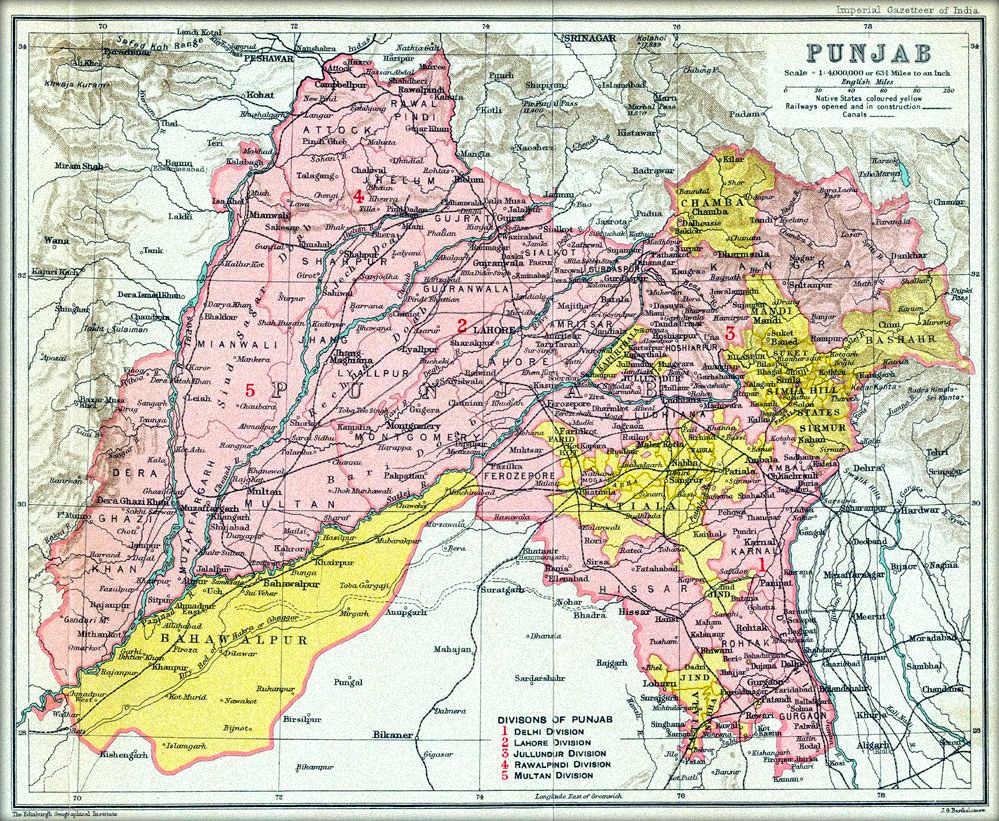
- Titles: Mihir, Mir, Mehr, Chaudhary Map of undivided Punjab region (now divided as Punjab, India and Punjab, Pakistan including Haryana and Himachal Pradesh).

Gurjars in Punjab or Punjabi Gujjars, are an ethnic community native to the larger region of Punjab now divided into Punjab, Pakistan and Punjab, India. They are descended from Gurjars who moved into this region during medieval times. They are scattered across almost all districts of Pakistani and Indian Punjab; They are densely populated in Rawalpindi, Sialkot, Lahore, Gujranwala, Gujrat, Jhelum, Faislabad, Bhakkar, Attock, Murree, Sargodha, Sahiwal, Dera Ghazi Khan, Mianwali, Multan, Okara, Hoshiarpure, Pathankot, Ludhiana, Rupnagar (Ropar), Nawanshahr, Amritsar, Firozpur, Jalandhar, Patiala, Kapurthala, Faridkot, and Malerkotla districts, while Barnala and Rajanpur have the smallest Gujjar population. They adopted Islam in the medieval period, mostly through the influence of Sufism, from the 11th century to the 16th century. Now in Punjab the majority of Gurjars are Muslims, with Hindu and Sikh Gurjars as minority ethnoreligious groups.

They accounted among the largest ethnic group in Pakistani Punjab, and in 1961 census of India, they were the 8th largest ethnic group in Indian Punjab. Gurjars make up majority in the western parts (West Punjab) and Jats make up majority in the eastern part (East Punjab) of the Punjab region.

In historical era they ruled and gave names to several places in Punjab region: these places include Gujrat, Gujranwala, Gujar Khan, Gojra and Dera Gujran. (Note: Gurjar is an important ethnic group of the Punjab region, they ruled and gave name to various places including: Gujranwala, Gujrat, Gujar Khan, Dera Gujran, & Gojra.)

In Indian Punjab, Muslim Gurjars live in isolation and have not maintained marital relationships with Sikh and Hindu Gurjars, whereas Sikh and Hindu Gurjars often have marital ties with each other.

Gurjar is a major landholding and agricultural ethnic group of the Punjab region along with Arain, Rajput, Jat, and other Punjabi communities. (Note: Gurjar is an agricultural and landholding community of Punjab.)

According to the 1931 census of British India, which was the last census to systematically count caste, the Gurjar population in the Punjab region was 6,96,442. Breaking down the population by religion, Muslim Gurjars made up about 75% (5,21,347), Hindu Gurjars accounted for around 24.5% (1,70,439), and Sikh Gurjars totalled about 0.5% (4,446).

In Punjab, they are part of the larger Punjabi community, holding a similar social standing to Rajputs, Jats, and other Punjabi communities, with no inherent hierarchy placing one above the others. (Note: Social status of Gurjars in Punjab, Pakistan is equal to all other Punjabi communities in the area.)

== History ==
Gurjars live in central and North Punjab, such as Gujrat and Gujranwala in Punjab, Pakistan. They are found from India to Afghanistan, traveling through Sindh and Punjab. They see themselves as a group of high status and respect. However, their way of life changes by location.

According to Romila Thapar, the Gurjars likely have origin from north India. Place names in the Punjab region, like Gujrat and Gujranwala districts, suggest they settled there. We also see Gurjar communities living in Kashmir. The presence of the Gurjar community in Maharashtra shows that they moved further south. The wide distance between these areas shows how much they migrated over time. Historian Richard V. Weekes, said that, Gurjars made their homes in Punjab, Kashmir, and parts of northwestern India. Places likes Gujranwala and Gujrat, now located in Punjab, Pakistan, still carry names that reflect the Gurjars's early presence in these regions, serving as evidence of their historical settlements.

According to Acharya S. K., the northern Indian communities including the Gurjars along with Jats and Ahirs mainly contributed to the formation of Punjabis of Punjab, Pakistan and Punjab, India and Haryanvis.

Some accounts suggest that the town of Gujrat was rebuilt by Gurjar rulers during the reign of Mughal emperor Akbar in the 16th century.

During the 1857 unrest, Sultan Ali, a Gujjar leader of the Kalas clan in Ajnala, Gujrat, kept his area safe from looters. The British government rewarded him with land and the title of Safed Posh for his bravery. His son, Fazal-e-Ali, continued doing good work by building schools, hospitals, and banks. People loved and respected him so much that the British government gave him the title of Nawab. He was popularly known as Sir Syed of the Punjab region. Nawab Fazal Ali had two sons Nawab Mehdi Ali and Nawab Asghar Ali. Nawab Mehdi Ali died in 1958. Nawab Asghar Ali held several positions, including chairman of the District Board and Central Co-operative Bank. He also contributes to education by developing Zamindara High school into a degree college.

=== Chiefs of Jhelum ===
In the 17th century in Punjab, Gurjars cleared the Chahal forest areas and established some settlements. Two Gurjar brothers of Poswal clan names Akbar and Shakar, arrived in Gujrat from the Jhelum area and founded two villages, Akbarpur and Shakarpur. Queen Sada Kaur wife of Gurbaksh Singh Kanhaiya merged these villages naming combined area "Kala", a term used in early Punjabi language to describe a large settlement. In Later years, Suleman Poswal, a Gurjar from the same family, established his power in the areas of "Kala" in present-day Gujrat and Jhelum cities. Suleman Poswal had seven sons: Jalal, Jamal, Handhal, Mubarak, Essa, Musa, and Habib.

According to scholar Mehakraj, Suleman Poswal Gurjar was a brave ruler of the Kala Gujran area, and he fought against the Gakhars of Jhelum and Janjuas for a long period. He ruled Kala Gujran, and areas near the Rohtas Fort were also under his control. It's said that when Ahmad Shah Abdali came to Punjab, one of Suleman Poswal 's elders, Abdul Rahim Poswal and Raja Himat Khan Gakhar attended Abdali's court. He was by their influence in their areas and he appointed Abdul Rahim and Himat Khan as his servants, assigning them some duties in Punjab.

=== Nawab of Dera Ghazi Khan ===
In the 18th century, Mahmud Khan Gujjar (or Mehmood) served as the de facto ruler and governor of the Dera Ghazi Khan from around 1738 to 1772. He was the son of Yusuf Khan. Previously he served as a grand wazir under Mirranis. He teamed up with the Durranis to overthrow Mirranis and then initiated a project to build and restore canals in D.G Khan. Punjab Government Gazetteer credit him with founding the settlement of Mahmud Kot and initiating canal works in the region.

=== Mughal period ===
It is believed that Gurjars in the Sutlej, Beas, and Kandi regions of Indian Punjab came from Delhi during the Mughal rule in India, when Delhi was part of the Punjab region.

In 1519, Babar Mughal, during his Punjab campaign, captured Bhera and the next year (1520) he invaded again, taking control of the territory up to Sialkot. He also forced the Gakhars and Gurjars to submission.

According to some historical accounts, when first Mughal emperor Babur invaded India in 1525, he found that the Gurjars of Punjab, especially in the northern parts, had already embraced Islam religion. The conversion of Gurjars to Islam in Punjab region continued until the 1700s, during the reign of the Mughal emperor Aurangzeb, suggesting a prolonged period of religious transitions in the region.

Babur's own account in the Babarnama of 1525, highlights the challenges he faced in Punjab. He noted that the Gurjars and Jats continued to resist even after he captured Sialkot district, targeting people affiliated with his camp. According to Babur, these groups would attack and loot travelers including the vulnerable, as they moved towards his camp. He wrote:

"The Jats and Gujjars come in huge numbers from the hills and plains to steal cattle. They attacked poor people leaving Sialkot for our camp and took everything they had."

— Babur,

In 1526, Babur arrived in Lahore and then headed towards Delhi in Punjab region. Although he faced significant challenges, including Ibrahim Khan Lodi's large army of 1,000 elephant and 100,000 soldiers, Babur's focus remained on reaching Delhi. Meanwhile, he received news of Uzbek attacks on Kabul and other rebellions in his Afghan territories. Additionally, his army was constantly harassed by "Gurjars of the Punjab" region. Babur prioritized his Delhi campaign, deciding not to Get sidetracked these problems right away, since he knew it would ruin his whole plan.

A Mughal-era historian, Abul Fazl, writes that Gurjars lived along the route through Sialkot (now Sialkot district of Punjab, Pakistan). Records from that era also show people in Bhimber and Sialkot districts complained about the Gurjars in these areas.

The rebellious Gujjars and Kharals of Rachna Doab region of Punjab, along with the defiant landowners near Multan, often threatened Mughal rule in Punjab. By 1714-15, the Mughals had lost control over at least part of Khushab pargana in Sindh Sagar Doab. Their disobedience was so strong that even Mughal government villages in Bahlolpur pargana were affected. In areas outside Mughal's Punjab, many landowners refused to help Banda Singh Bahadur, even though they also had conflicts with the Mughals. Banda also failed to join forces with the large Gujjar uprisings, even through they were happening at the same time as his attacks in the region. In Sikh stronghold areas, Gujjar and Rajput landowners, and most Afghan landowners, regularly backed the Mughal army's campaigns against Banda Singh Bahadur.

==== Conflict with Sikh gurus ====
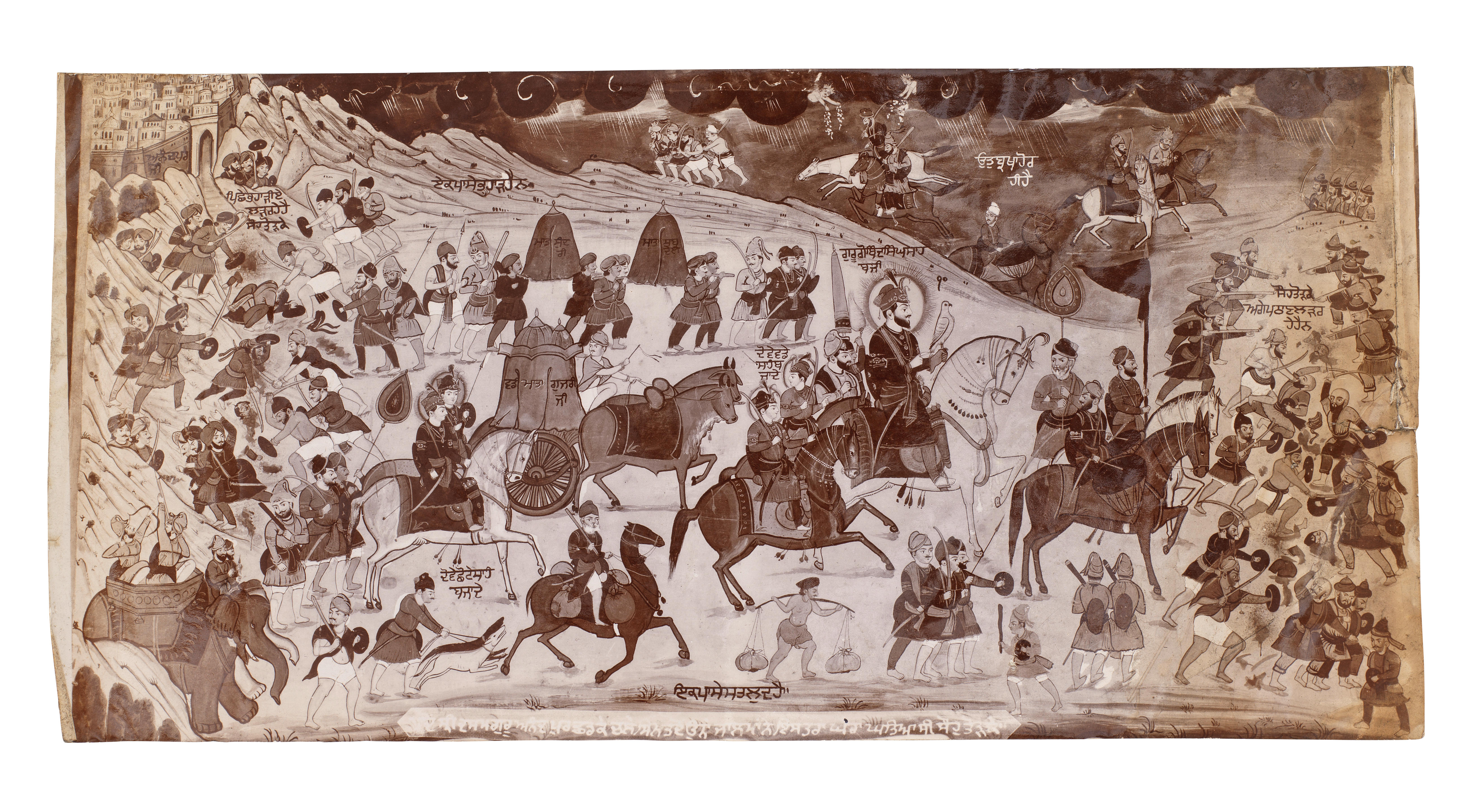
Painting depicting the Siege or Battle of Anandpur (1704–1705) in Punjab region under Mughal era.

In the 17th and 18th centuries, the Muslim Gurjars of eastern Punjab, along with the Ranghar Rajputs, were involved in a major conflict with the Sikh Gurus. They formed alliances with the hill chiefs of the Hill States in northern Punjab and the Mughal army. The Gurjars were led by a prominent leader named Azmatullah in this conflict. During the emergences of Sikhism in the Punjab region, there were Muslim Gurjars and Ranghars who often clashed with Sikh nobles. In the 17th century Ajmer Chand, the ruler of the Bilaspur state, got Gurjars and Rangars to join his army to fight against the Sikhs. These groups were Muslim by faith and loved in villages near present-day Anandpur Sahib in Punjab, India in his territory. They were organized into various clans, each with a leader, and had a history of causing trouble and robbing Sikhs traveling to Anandpur area. Ajmer Chand likely appealed to their communal feelings and tendency to cause trouble to get them to work together again the Sikhs.

Thereafter, the Mughal troops returned to Sirhind with unsure satisfaction of achieving although at a great cost, the limited objective of expelling the Khalsa from the territory of Ajmer Chand on the Eastern side of the River Sutlej. The Hill Rajas also withdrew to their respective states. Once Guru Gobind Singh and his family put up at the residence of the Raja while beautiful canopies were pitched in the suburb of the town for accommodating the Khalsa soldiers. The Guru stayed at Basoli for some days, resting and enjoying hunting and other sports. Soon, the Guru took initiative against Ajmer Chand leading incursions into his territory on the North of River Sutlej. He reached towards Anandpur. Later Guru Gobind Singh and his family stayed at the Raja's place, while fancy tents were set up outside the town for the Khalsa soldiers. The Gobind hung out in Basoli for a bit, chilling and doing some hunting and stuff. Before long, he started raiding Ajmer Chand's territory north of the Sutlej River.

Something else happened in Bajraur village of Anandpur that's important to Sikh history. Some Gurjars and Ranghars from Bajraur attacked a group of Sikhs heading to Anandpur Sahib in 1701, stealing all their stuff. The Sikhs with nothing and told Guru Gobind Singh what happened. Gobind Singh slowly made his way to Anandpur. At that time Gurjars and Ranghars from Kamlot village attacked the village. Jiwan Singh a notable Sikh general, died in the fight. Since Wazir Khan had left for Sirhind, Amjeer Chand thought he'd gotten rid of the Guru, But Gobind Singh returned to Anandpur, succeed in repairing damage, and restored the Anandpur's status as the headquarter of the Khalsa. The Hill chiefs had to retreat, but the hill chiefs were still dead set on kicking the Guru out. They got ready for war, roped in the Gurjars and Rangars, and asked the Mughals for help. The Mughals had been keeping and eye on the Sikhs and they directly got involved in the war.

=== Contributions for Punjabi literature ===
Gurjar personalities of Muslim Punjabi identity play an important role in the development of Punjabi literature.

Afarin Lahori (full name Faqirullah Afarin Lahori) was a 17th-century Punjabi poet from Lahore, born around 1660 and died in 1741. He's famous for his poem "Nāz - o - niaz or Hir-o-ranjha Ranjha, which tells the story of Heer and Ranjha. He mostly wrote in Punjabi and one book in Persian. He is respected in Punjab, Azad Kashmir and Hazara for his work for his contributions for Punjabi literature. He was born 1660 in Lahore, Punjab during the Mughal Empire, into the Juiya clan of Punjabi Muslim Gurjar family.

Ahmad Shah Gujjar was a 17th century Punjabi poet. He's known writing a version of the Heer Ranjha story offering a unique twist on the tale. "Here Ahonad", was popular among later Muslim poets, including Waris Shah, who wrote his famous version about 30 years later. Ahmad Gujjar was the first Muslim writer to create a poetic version of this story. He was born in a Punjabi speaking Gurjar family in 1617 AD.

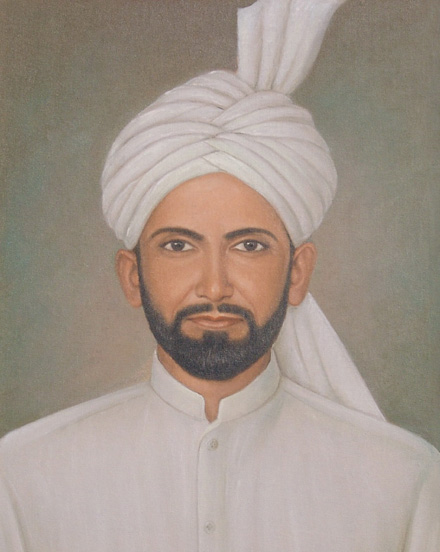
Ghulam Rasool Alampuri Punjabi poet.

Ghulam Rasool Alampuri was a 19th-century Punjabi poet. He was born on 29 January 1849, and passed away on 7 March 1892. He's known for his notable works like "Dastan-i Amir Hamza" and Ahsan al-qasas", which showcase his spiritual and literary contributions in Punjabi. He was born in Alampur village in Hoshiarpur district of Punjab, India in a Punjabi speaking family of Muslim Gurjars.

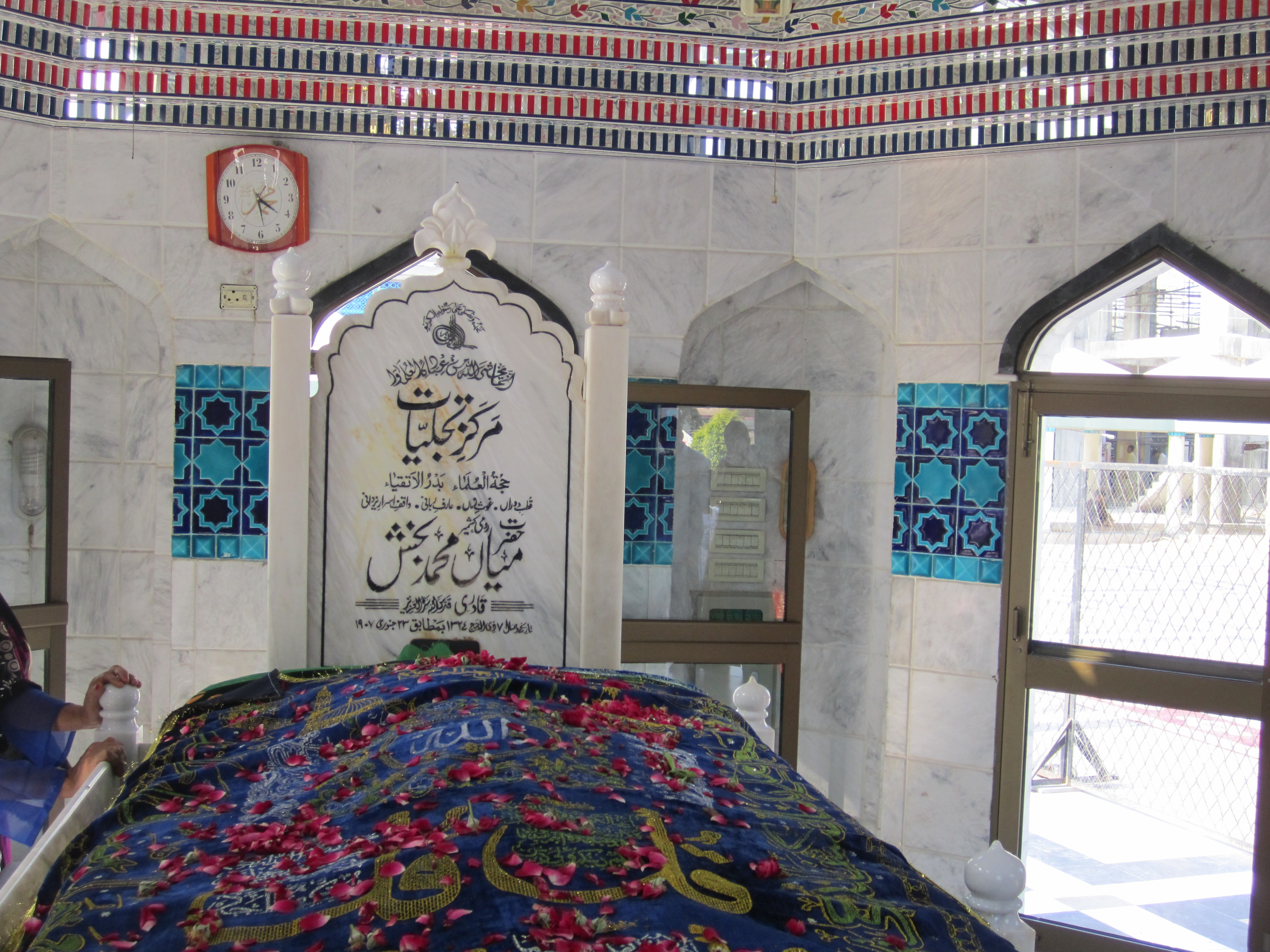
Shrine of Mian Muhammad Bakhsh in Khari Sharif, Azad Kashmir.

Mian Muhammad Bakhsh was a 19th-century Punjabi Gujjar Sufi poet from Khari Sharif, Azad Kashmir. He wrote total 18 books, including Saif-ul-Maluk and Mirza Sahiban, mostly in Punjabi, with one Book in Persian. He was born around 1830 in Khari Sharif, a place in what is now Azad Kashmir, Pakistan. He belonged to a Punjabi Muslim Gurjar family of the Poswal clan, originally from Gujrat district of Punjab, Pakistan.

=== British period ===
Carolyn Stedman describes the Gujjars in Rawalpindi district as excellent as cultivating. In Hoshiarpur district of Punjab, India Gujjars are known for being peaceful and well-behaved.

In 1857, Gurjars took arms against the Britishers in Punjab and the United province; the chaos gave locals a chance to loot business areas. The British government's presence vanished instantly. Apparently, the Muslim Gurjars and Ranghars put the Muslim green flags, and all sorts of troublemakers gathered around them.

In 1900, the British administrators in Punjab region introduced the "Punjab Alienation of Land Act", labeling certain groups as agricultural communities. This act created 'statutory casteism' by designating specific castes as castes as 'zamindar or agricultural tribes', effectively making Zamindar' synonymous with members of these agricultural castes. The goal was to protect Punjab's peasantry, who were heavily indebted and losing land to moneylenders, mainly from non-cultivating trading classes. This was crucial since these peasants were key recruits for the British army and their instability could threaten British Raj. In the region of Punjab, the agricultural communities were identified as Gurjar, Rajput, Jat, Sayed, Moghal, Ahir and some other communities of Punjab. In later years, Taga, Arain, Ahir, Saini, Chauhan, Gaud Brahman, and Qureshi were also included, distinguishing them from non-agriculturist groups like Brahman, Khatris, Banians, and Scheduled Caste groups.

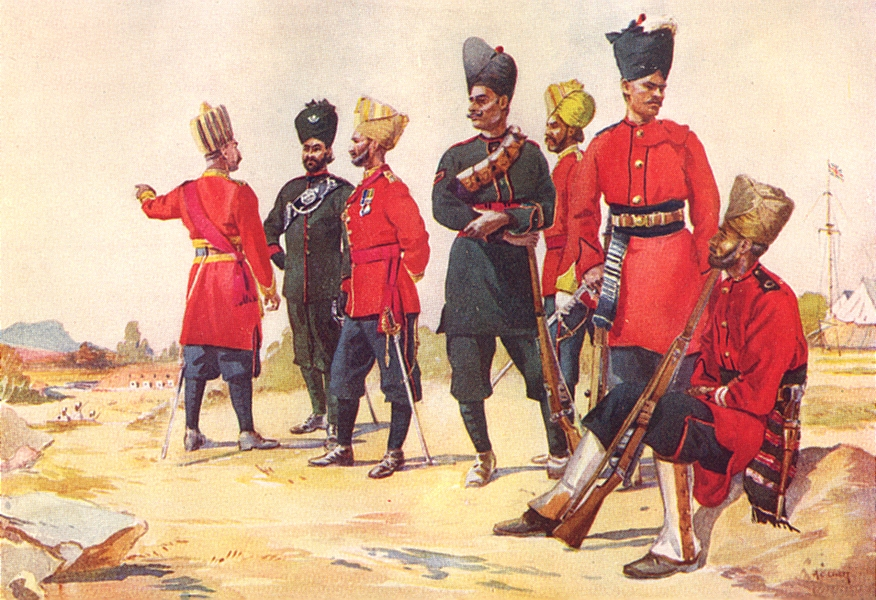
A depiction of three Gurjar subadar-major amongst other British Indian Army troops. (Left to right 1. "Gurjar of Punjab", 113th Punjab Infantry, 2. Gurjar of Gujarat, 104th Wellesley's Rifles, Gurjar of Jaipur, 119th Infantry (119th Infantry (Multan regiment), 4. other British subedar-major from Rajasthan.)

Lieutenant-colonel J.M. Wikeley, a recruiting officer for Punjabi Muslims, In 1915, wrote a handbook on the 'martial race' of Punjabi Muslims. He said term "Punjabi Musalman" refers to Muslim communities in a specific area of Punjab and West Frontier Province, bounded by the Indus and Sutlej rivers, and south of the Himaylayas. This region includes Hazara district, Rawalpindi district, and parts of Jammu and Poonch in Kashmir. It's a label used for British military recruitment, not an ethnic classification. These martial communities can be grouped into total four classes: Rajput, Jat, Gurjars, and other foreign tribes.

Lieutenant Colonel McMunn describes Gurjars, Jats, and Ahirs as distinct Hindu communities found in south-east Punjab, nearby Rajasthan, and western United Provinces (UP). He notes that Gurjars tend to be sturdy and are swarthier than Jats and Ahirs.

In the 1920s the Shuddhi movement by Arya Samaj in the Punjab region focused on purifying higher-caste converts like Muslim Gurjars, Muslim Jats, and Muslim Rajputs, aiming to reintegrate them into their original Hindu community. Many of these converts still practiced Hindu traditions, making reintegration seems feasible. However, despite purification rituals, they faced rejection from their original Hindu caste biradari, leading to humiliation. This rejection contributed to the movements failure and hundred attitudes among converted communities, pushing some back to Islam religion.

In the British colonial era, the Gujjar community was divided into various clans that played an important role in their social organization. British administrator Denzil Ibbetson, in his work "Castes of Punjab", notes a total of nineteen notable clans of Gujjars in British Punjab. These clans include: Tanwar, Chokhar, Rawal, Kalsian, Khatana, Kasana, Kalas, Gorsi, Chechi, Dhodar, Poswal, Lawi, Bijar, Khaindar, Melu, Thakaria, Chauhan, Monana, and Bhumls. According to Horace Arthur Rose, Chechi and Kasana were the major clans of Gujjars in the region of British Punjab.

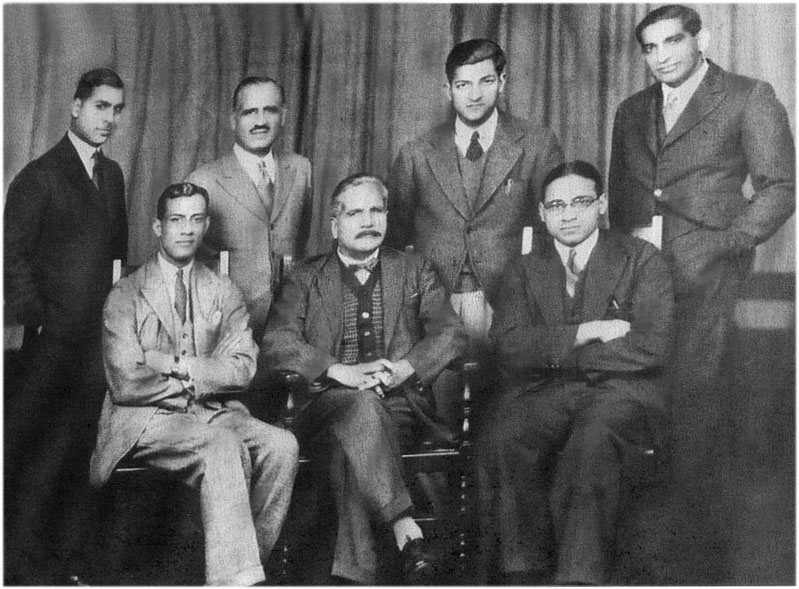
Choudhry Rehmat Ali (seated first from left) with Muhammad Iqbal (center), Khawaja Abdul Rahim (right) and a group of other young activists during Iqbal visit to England in 1932

In 1930s, Choudhry Rahmat Ali, a Punjabi Gurjar was a key figure in the independence movement of Pakistan, he credited with coining the term "Pakistan" for a separate Muslim country in British India. He was born in Balachaur, Hoshiarpure district, Punjab, he pursued education in Lahore before moving to the Cambridge university. In 1933 he published an influential pamphlet title "Now or Never; Are we to Live or Perish Forever?", referred to as the "Pakistan Declaration ". This pamphlet was aimed at British and Indian delegates attending the Third Round Table Conference in London. Initially, his ideas failed to gain traction with politicians and delegates, taking nearly a decade to gain recognition.

== Demographics ==
=== Punjab, Pakistan ===
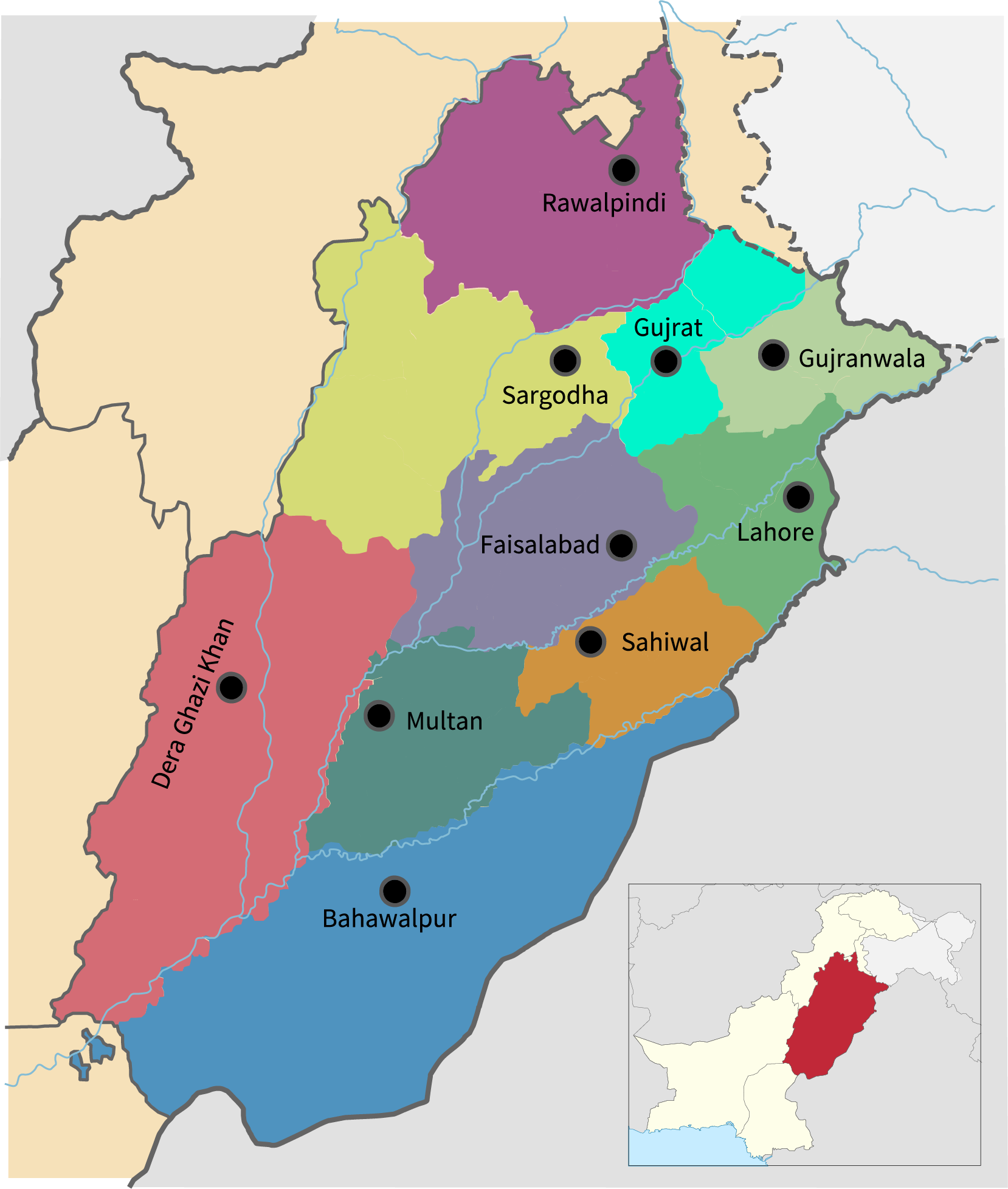
Divisions of Punjab, Pakistan

In Pakistani Punjab Gurjars scattered across almost all ten divisions including Rawalpindi, Lahore, Gujranwala, Gujrat, Multan, Dera Ghazi Khan, Sargodha, Bahawalpur, Faisalabad, and Sahiwal.

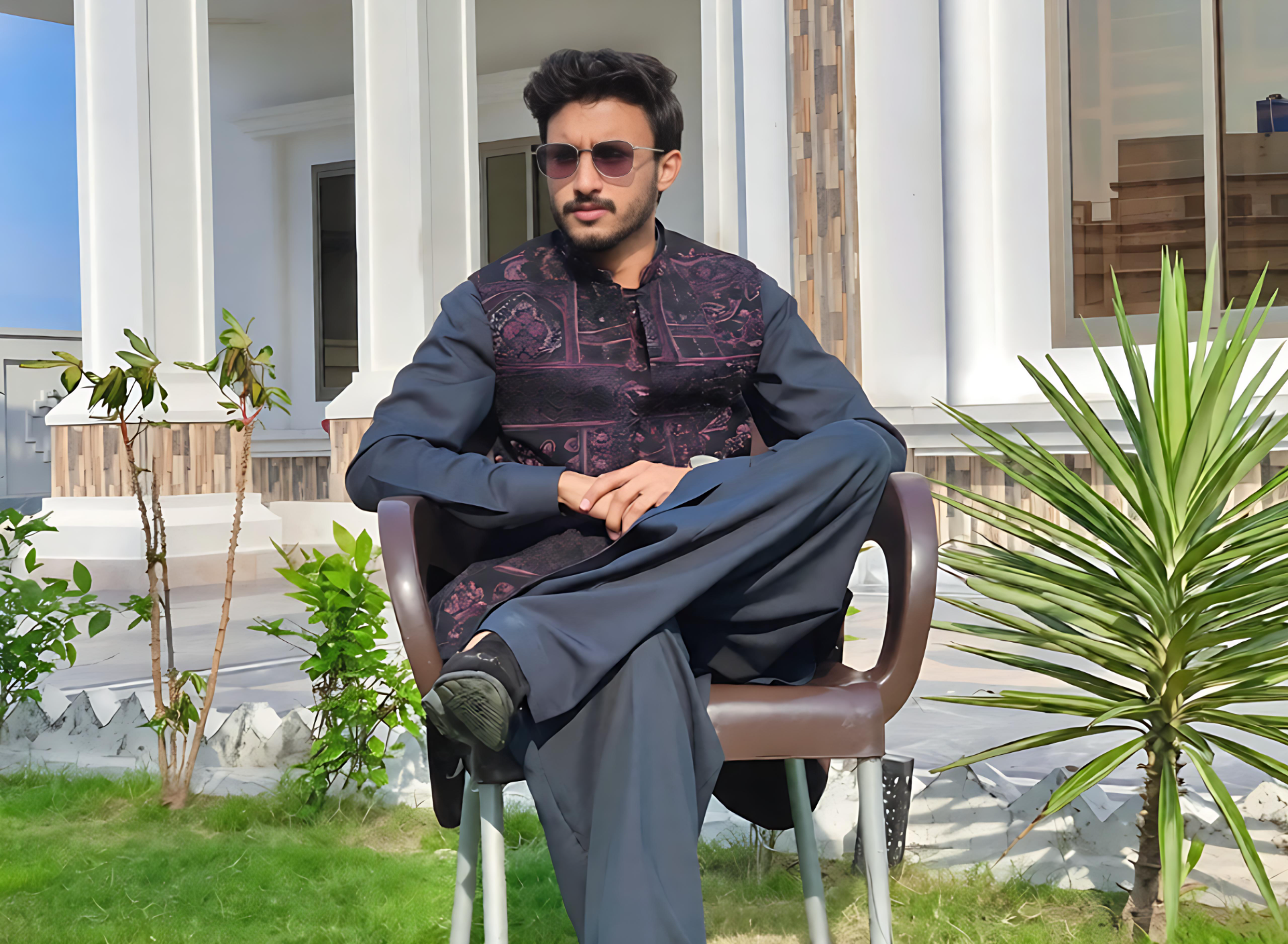
A Gurjar man in traditional Punjabi dress from Gujrat district, Punjab, Pakistan.

Gurjars make a majority population or significant population in Jhelum, Chakwal, Attock, Khanewal Sialkot, Narowal, Mandi Bahauddin, Gujrat and Gujranwala districts of Punjab, Pakistan.

==== Historical population ====
Population of Gujjars recorded in different census reports of the British India for present-day Punjab, Pakistan.

Historical population
Year	Pop.	±% p.a.
1911	201,995	—
1921	208,078	+0.30%
1931	227,015	+0.87%
source: 1911 census - 1921 census - 1931 census

=== Punjab, India ===
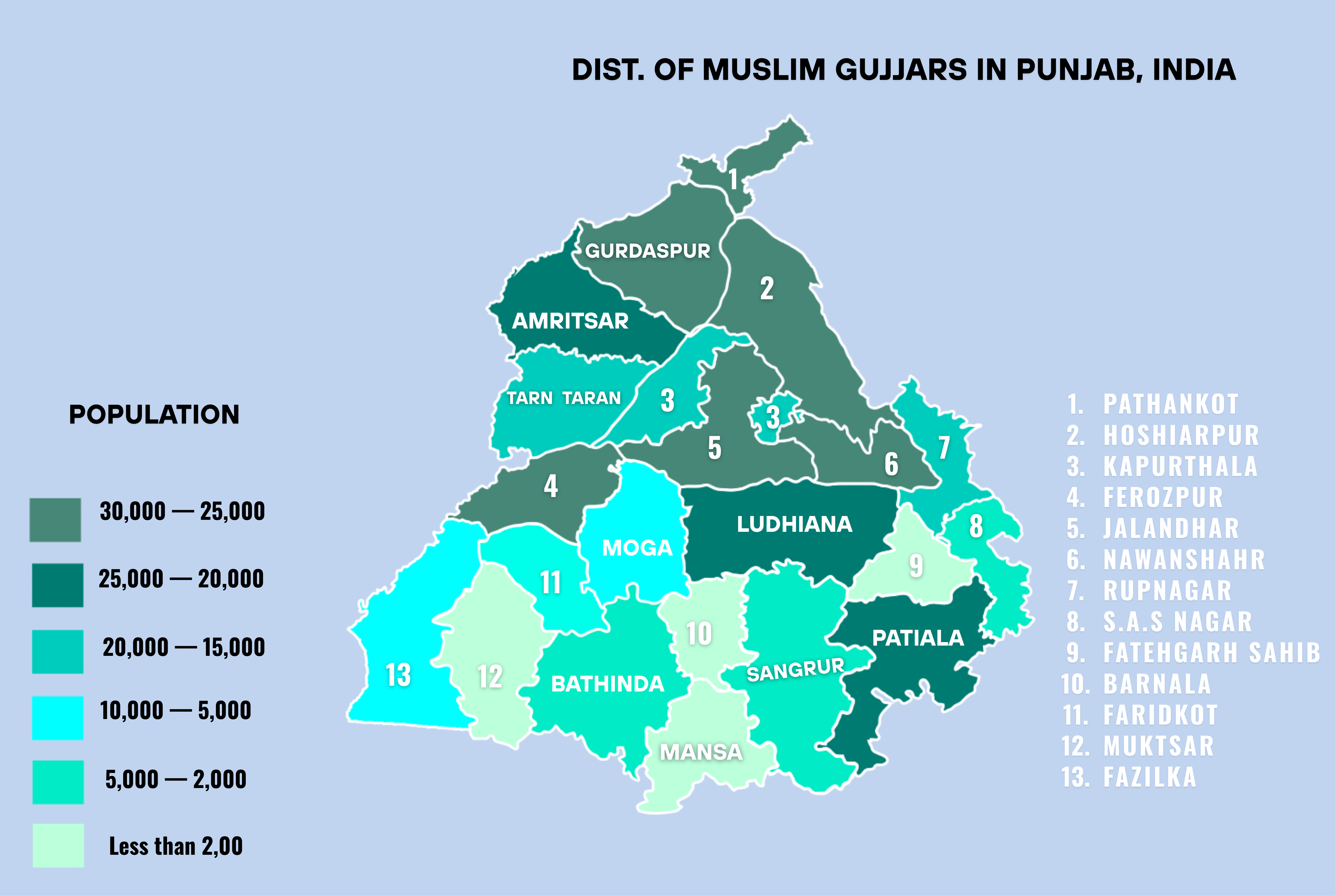
Population distribution of Gurjars on Punjab, India.

In Indian Punjab Gurjars scattered across almost all five divisions including: Jalandhar, Patiala, Firozepur, Faridkot, and Ropar (Rupnagar). The permanent settlements of Hindu and Muslim Gurjars' are located in the Beas, Kandi, and Shivalik hills regions of Punjab.

Gurjars population is distributed across various districts, with Muslim Gurjars being predominantly found in Hoshiarpure, Jalandhar, Firozepur, Pathankot, Gurdaspur, and Jalandhar districts. In contrast, Hindu Gurjars are mainly concentrated in Ropar, Hoshiarpure and Nawanshahr districts, whereas Sikh Gurjars are primarily located in Jalandhar and Ludhiana districts.

==== Historical population ====
Population of Gujjars recorded in different census reports of Indian Punjab.

Historical population
Year	Pop.	±% p.a.
1911	183,144	—
1921	202,402	+1.00%
1931	230,474	+1.31%
1951	291,601	+1.18%
source: 1911 census - 1921 census - 1931 census - 1951 census

In recent decades some tribal Gujjar families migrated from Jammu and Kashmir and Himachal Pradesh to Punjab, now they settled in the areas of Chabbewal, Chamkaur Sahib, Garshankar, Hoshiarpure, Ludhiana, Manchhiwara, Ropar, Nawanshahr, and Pathankot. Now some got settled permanently and obtained voting rights and Adhaar cards. But they weren't able to secure special rights like ST status or forest rights that they had in Himachal Pradesh or Kashmir.

When these Gurjars moved to Punjab plain, they socially were accepted as the part of already existing larger landlord Gurjar community of the area in Punjab, India by the non-Gujar communities.

== Social status ==
Social status of the Gurjars in Punjab, Pakistan is generally equal to all other ethnic groups of the region including, Rajputs and Jats. Gujjars have high social status along with other Punjabi communities because they own land and other resources like farms and industries.

In Indian Punjab Gurjars of all religious backgrounds are classified as other backward classes (OBC). In 1974, Gurjars in Indian Punjab were given OBC status for a period of 5 years, and then in 1979, this status was made permanent by the Government of Punjab, India.

=== Demands for ST status ===
Tribal Gurjars who have migrated in recent decades from Jammu and Kashmir are now settled in the northern areas of Punjab, India. They have demanded Scheduled Tribe status, but the Government of Punjab, India hasn't fulfill their demands yet.

In 2009, the Government of Punjab, India released a survey report based on 12 communities. Report said eight tribes, including Tribal Gurjars and seven others qualify as Scheduled tribes (ST) in Punjab, India.

== Clan system ==
Gurjars have a system of clans called gotras (tribes), which are passed down through the father's line. They believe these clans connect them to a shared ancestor. The gotra (clan) a person belongs to determines who they can marry.

Among Punjabi Gurjars, there are Dhai gots (clans), especially Kushan (Kasana), Gorsi, and Barkat (Bargar). Mostly these gots don't have strict rules against marrying within them a Gurjar person can marry someone from the same clan or from the different clan.

=== Clans ===
- Bajar (Bajjar)
- Bhumla (Bhoomla)
- Chechi
- Meelu
- Awana (Awan)
- Kushan (Kasana)
- Bhargar
- Bhatia
- Bhadana
- Baharwal
- Chaprana
- Chauhan
- Chhabri
- Dedhar (Deda)
- Doi
- Khatana
- Khaindar
- Miana
- Monan
- Karhana
- Sardhana
- Poswal (Poruswal)
- Chockar
- Gorsi
- Thikaria
- Lodha
- Lawi (Laur)
- Rawal

==== District wise ====
District wise population of some notable Gurjar clans in undivided region of Punjab.

District	clan	population	clan	population	clan	population	clan	population	clan	population	clan	population	clan	population
Ludhiana	Khatana	749	Kushan	695	Kalas	1,175	Gorsi	3,462	Cherhi	3,285	Chockar	0	Rawal	0
Jalandhar	Khatana	546	Kushan	388	Kalas	565	Gorsi	1,457	Chechi	1,152	Chockar	0	Rawal	0
Amritsar	Khatana	153	Kushan	134	Kalas	0	Gorsi	180	Chechi	645	Chockar	0	Rawal	0
Gurdaspur	Tanwar	1,140	Chockar	336	Khatana	2,750	Kushan	1,133	Kalas	0	Gorsi	17,72	Chechi	4,010
Lahore	Chockar	1	Rawal	13	Khatana	445	Kushan	82	Kalas	0	Gorsi	290	Chechi	1,020
Rawalpindi	Chockar	280	Rawal	0	Khatana	5,646	Kushan	612	Kalas	1,318	Gorsi	1,232	Chechi	3,207
Jhelum	Chockar	20	Rawal	0	Khatana	3,684	Kushan	882	Kalas	1,260	Gorsi	309	Chechi	1,621
Sialkot	Chockar	3	Rawal	10	Khatana	1,020	Kushan	349	Kalas	0	Gorsi	277	Chechi	692
Gujranwala	Chockar	0	Rawal	17	Khatana	125	Kushan	25	Kalas	60	Gorsi	38	Chechi	205
Firozepur	Chockar	0	Rawal	0	Khatana	1,138	Kushan	312	Kalas	166	Gorsi	870	Chechi	779
Gujrat	Chockar	269	Rawal	0	Khatana	21,449	Kushan	3,048	Kalas	3,560	Gorsi	3,312	Chechi	8,092

District	clan	population	clan	population	clan	population	clan	population	clan	population	clan	population	clan	population	clan	population	clan	population	clan	population
Ludhiana	Dedhar	1139	Poswal	1690	Lawi	613	Bijjar	1584	Khaindar	0	Meelu	400	Thikaria	29	Chauhan	518	Monan	30	Bhumla	0
Jalandhar	Dedhar	88	Poswal	1139	Lawi	173	Bijjar	683	Khaindar	0	Meelu	1	Thikaria	0	Chauhan	682	Monan	278	Bhumla	0
Amritsar	Dedhar	0	Poswal	197	Lawi	0	Bijjar	180	Khaindar	0	Meelu	0	Thikaria	0	Chauhan	146	Monan	69	Bhumla	0
Gurdaspur	Dedhar	215	Poswal	1687	Lawi	30	Bijjar	710	Khaindar	0	Meelu	0	Thikaria	880	Chauhan	1151	Monan	4749	Bhumla	0
Lahore	Dedhar	54	Poswal	198	Lawi	40	Bijjar	178	Khaindar	0	Meelu	17	Thikaria	4	Chauhan	194	Monan	91	Bhumla	0
Rawalpindi	Dedhar	310	Poswal	2417	Lawi	4	Bijjar	1041	Khaindar	0	Meelu	26	Thikaria	975	Chauhan	2361	Monan	344	Bhumla	0
Jehlum	Dedhar	451	Poswal	1349	Lawi	36	Bijjar	907	Khaindar	0	Meelu	0	Thikaria	758	Chauhan	1287	Monan	62	Bhumla	35
Sialkot	Dedhar	169	Poswal	541	Lawi	1	Bijjar	176	Khaindar	0	Meelu	0	Thikaria	0	Chauhan	517	Monan	0	Bhumla	0
Gujranwala	Dedhar	0	Poswal	27	Lawi	0	Bijjar	126	Khaindar	0	Meelu	0	Thikaria	43	Chauhan	221	Monan	0	Bhumla	0
Firozepur	Dedhar	338	Poswal	389	Lawi	114	Bijjar	215	Khaindar	0	Meelu	0	Thikaria	0	Chauhan	332	Monan	170	Bhumla	0
Gujrat	Dedhar	1921	Poswal	3491	Lawi	150	Bijjar	3592	Khaindar	0	Meelu	1380	Thikaria	3521	Chauhan	7985	Monan	382	Bhumla	2180

== Religion ==
In east Punjab they're divided into three Ethnoreligious groups: Muslim Gurjars, Hindu Gurjars and Sikh Gurjars. Muslim Gurjars are spread throughout the Punjab, Pakistan and can also be found in the Kandi, Majha, Doaba and Malwa regions of Punjab, India. Hindu and Sikh Gurjars found in southern and eastern parts of Punjab, India. Prior to the partition of Punjab, the Gurjars in the region practiced Islam, followed by Hinduism and Sikhism. Muslim Gurjars were predominantly located in western Punjab (present-day Punjab, Pakistan) and northern and western parts of present-day Punjab, India. The Hindu Gurjars were mainly found in the southeastern parts of Indian Punjab, and Sikh Gurjars were concentrated in Jalandhar and Ludhiana districts.

In Indian Punjab, some Hindu Gurjars also practice the tradition of ancestor worship. Every Gurjar clan have its own separate place of worship for ancestors.

=== Conversion ===
It is believed initially Gurjars of Punjab were Hindus. Later, they first embraced Islam between the 11th to 16th centuries, and then a small part of their community also embraced Sikhism in the 17th century. They mainly embraced Islam during the rule of Muslims in the Indian subcontinent.

In Punjab, they converted to Islam on different occasions, but most of their population converted to Islam in the 16th century. Hindu Gujjars of the Lahore district in present-day Punjab, Pakistan embraced Islam in the hands of Muslim saint Hazrat Data-Ali al-Hujwiri in the 11th century.

The Gurjars of the Gurdaspur and Jalandhar districts in Punjab, India embraced Islam during the rule of Mughal emperor Aurangzeb in the 17th century in Indian subcontinent.

Sir John Malcolm noted that the Jats, who largely made up the Sikh community, and the Gujars were among the primary groups that initially adopted Sikhism in the 17th century in Punjab. B.S Nijjar, noted that some Gurjars in certain areas of Hoshiarpure, Rupnagar, Nawanshahr districts in East Punjab became Sikh during and after Guru Gobind Singh's time in the 17th century, though they were relatively few in number.

== Culture ==
'Gurjars of Punjab' follow different religious practices. Hindu Gurjars are mainly Shaivism or Shaktism and are very devoted to worshiping Shitala Bhawanj, the goddess of smallpox. They also worship some minor gods including Chamar Pyareji, Baba Mohan Raam and Baba Sabha. Muslim Gurjars follow all Islamic laws and traditions and all of them are mainly Sunni Muslims.

=== Food ===
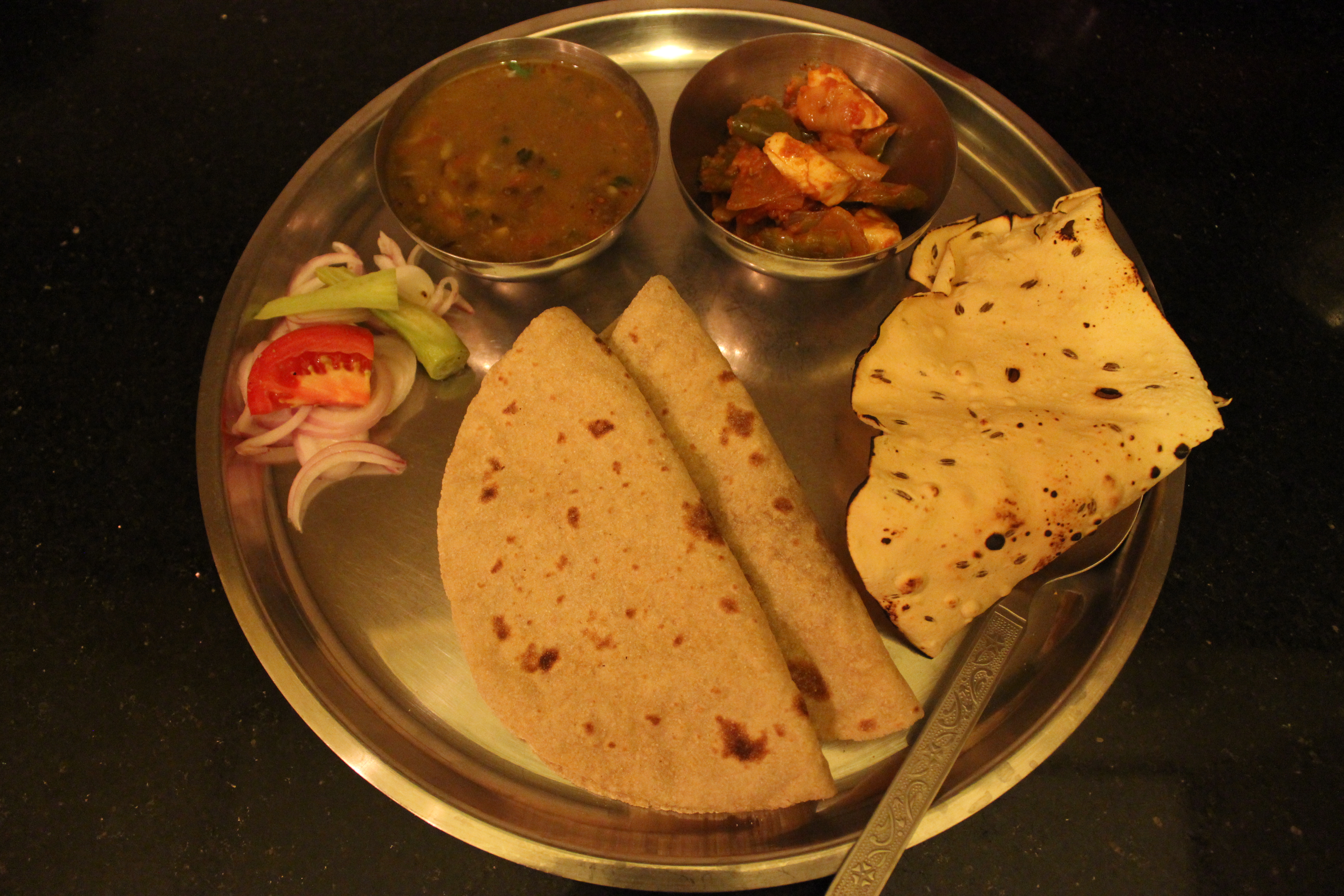
Typical Punjabi food (thali).

"Gurjars in Punjab", like other Punjabi communities, typically eat a simple diet that includes flatbread (Chhapati) made from wheat or corn, potatoes, very spicy onion curry, and lentils, and they usually don't eat meat. But on special occasions like Eid or other Muslim festivals, Muslim Gurjars eat meat dishes. They mostly drink milk, Lassi, and also eat butter with rotis. Gurjars like their tea sweet, and while they don't drink alcohol, they love Hookah, cigarettes and betel leaf.

=== Shrine visit ===
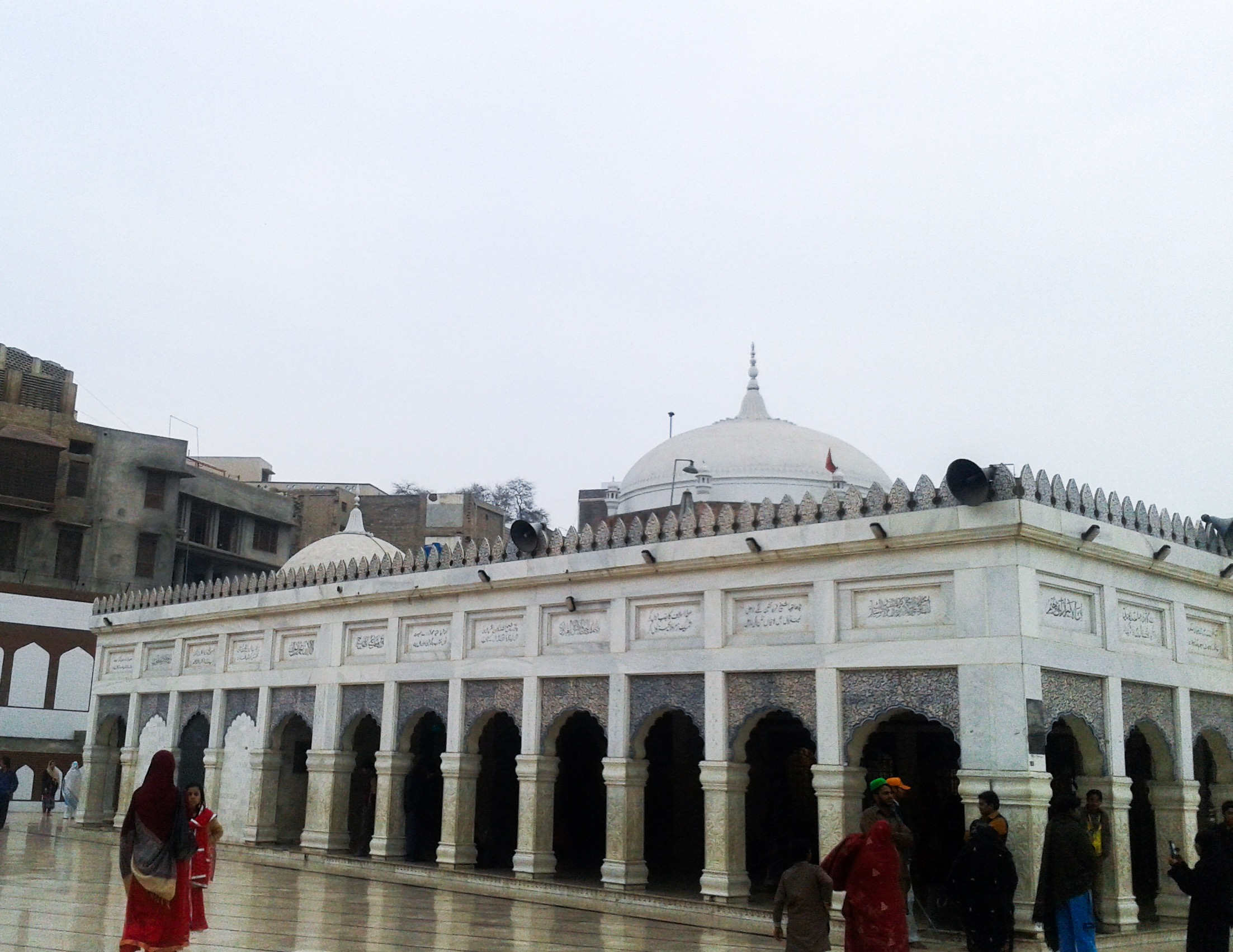
Shrine of Baba Farid.

Muslim Gurjars visit shrines of different Muslim saints including the shrine of Rauza Mandhali Sharif, Panj Pir Shrine, Sakhi Sarwar, Sharine of Data Ali Hajveri and the Shrine of Baba Farid. Although Punjabi Gurjars of all faiths in Punjab also visit shrines of Muslim Sufi saints.

Historian Varinder Shastri said, Hindu Gurjars in Punjab region often visit shrines of Muslim saints and they light candles there. Interestingly, Punjabi Sikh Gurjars also visit shrines. It seems that visiting shrines is a common practice among Gurjars of all religious backgrounds.

=== After death ===
Muslim Gurjars in Punjab on Thursday evenings (Jume-raat), offer food to their deceased ancestors. When someone dies, their family feeds beggars, hopping the food will reach the desceased in the afterlife.

=== Marriages ===
Most marriages among Punjabi Gurjars are based on parental approval, and they mostly prefer arranged marriages. Gurjar marriages usually happen when the kids are between 9 and 16 years old. In Gurjar communities girls aren't allowed to make their own decisions about getting married, and if an unmarried girl does something considered wrong, she's cut off from the community. She might be able to return if her partner is part of the tribe and she provides food for the community.

==== Marriage practices ====
Punjabi Gurjars follow different traditional marriage practices. Like other Muslim Gurjars communities Muslim Gurjars of Punjab usually have a nikah ceremony for weddings. Even so, many still follow some of their old customs. For example, when the bride arrives at her new home, her mother-in-law waves a tray (Parachhan/Chhadhar) over her head to keep away bad spirits. The wedding ceremonies are different Hindu Gurjars, but they often include giving away the bride (Kanyadan) and a procession where the couple walks around the wedding area (bhanwari).

==== Wedding rituals ====
The Gurjars in Punjab have some unique customs for weddings and births that blend Hindu and Muslim traditions. In Hoshiarpure district of east Punjab, there's a custom called "mudda ji rupaiya" where rich Gurjars give money to musicians (Mirasis) at weddings. They even give double to pregnant women.This makes them super respected, and they're called "gharbhan ka datu". Another custom, "bhaji", is like a long-standing financial connction between families. In the area of Nakodar, they still do some old-school stuff like "Pindwalna", where the groom's crew tries to surround the bride's village, but her peeps try to stop them. And in " Jhalka-bathi", girls won't let the brother-in-law light the wedding fire till he gets them a gift.

In Gurdaspur district Muslim Gurjars they make a cow dung idol when a son is born and have Brahmins bless the dad with sacred grass. They give gifts like clothes or money to the kid's female relatives. At weddings, they groom sits on a basket before getting dressed up, and they don't marry within their own clan (got/qabila). Some groups, like the Bhatia, don't follow this rule anymore. In Gujrat district of west Punjab, Muslim Gurjars follow similar customs with Muslim Jats. On Dhanteras, the mom takes a bath, and a Brahmin makes a Sacred square with a lamp. They. share food like rotis and halwa with clan members, but married daughters don't eat it since they're part of another clan group. At weddings, they do things differently than Hindu Gurjars.

==== Polygamy and Polyandry ====
In Punjab, Muslim Gurjars are mostly monogamous, but some also practice polygamy, where a man can have multiple wives. In contrast, Hindu Gurjars have traditionally practiced polyandry where a woman can have multiple husbands. Scholar Krishan Lal says that Hindu Gurjars used to practice polyandry where one woman would marry multiple brothers. This happened likely because of there weren't enough women in the tribe. The reason for this shortage was that people used to kill baby girls, a practice known as female infanticide, which was pretty common before the government made it illegal in 1870.

==== Cousins marriages ====
In Punjab, Muslim Gurjars often practice a type of marriage where people marry their cross-cousins, which creates repeating patterns of relationships between groups. With large families, it's not always possible to marry cross-cousins, so they look for more distant relatives or make new connections setting up future cross-cousins marriage.

=== Gender role ===
==== Men role ====
Men of the Gurjar communities typically spend their time looking after their fields, livestock, preparing food for them, selling dairy products, milk, and buying supplies from the market. The oldest man in the family is usually in charge, and older people are highly respected, getting to enjoy a more relaxed life compared to others. Many men take the lead in making decisions about religion and politics, but in some families, the oldest woman is the one who really calls the shots and has a lot of influence.

==== Women role ====
Gurjar women have a big role in their communities, and in traditional stories, they're often portrayed as brave and amazing. Gurjar women are in charge of cooking and cleaning. Often, each sister-in-law has her own cooking area in the hut, with continue to health issues like respiratory problems. While women fetch water, clean up, and cook, men typically relax, smoke, and sing. Women play a big role in family rituals and festivals, and they also pitch in with farm work, caring for animals, and gathering fuel when needed. The younger Gurjar women work really hard - they're up before anyone else and go to bed last. They cook meals, do laundry by hand, wash dishes, collect firewood, get food for the livestock, and do lots of other tasks throughout the day.

=== Language ===
The majority of 'Punjabi Gurjars' speak Punjabi as their primary language, with many also speaking additional languages such as Saraiki, Pahari-Pothwari, Hindi and Urdu. In northwestern areas of Punjab, Pakistan, some Gurjars also speak Gujari. In Punjab India certain Gurjar communities who have migrated from Jammu and Kashmir and Himachal Pradesh use Gujari as their mother tongue. Meanwhile, in southern areas of Punjab, Pakistan some Gurjars communicate in the Sarakai dialect of Punjabi.

In the 2011 Indian census, the Gujari-speaking population in Punjab, India was recorded as 7,024, spoken by Muslim Gujjars in the Hoshiarpur, Ludhiana, Amritsar, Gurdaspur, and Pathankot districts.

=== Gujari (raga) ===
Gujari, Gurjari, or Gujri Raga is a Raag in Indian classical music. It was originated in the Punjab region among the Punjabi Gurjars. It's also believed that the name of the raga is based on the traditional folk music of the tribal Gujars of Punjab region.

== Population ==
In 1951 census of India, the total Gurjar population in Punjab, India was 4,37,706. As per same census, 66.62% of the Gurjars followed Islam, while 33.38% were Hindus. The total Muslim Gujjar population was 2,91,601, (out of Punjab's total population of 91,60,500).

In recent decades, some tribal Gurjars migrated from Jammu and Kashmir and Himachal Pradesh to Punjab, India. Now there are approximately 4,000 Gurjars living in Indian Punjab, mainly belonging to the Bakarwal tribe.

In the northern parts of Pakistani Punjab, particularly in the Pothohar region, a total of 23,00,000 Gurjars reside there.

== Education ==
In East Punjab, most Tribal Gurjars lack basic education. Their kids often don't go to formal school. If they do, they usually don't go regularly. The problem is, school isn't taught in their native language, and it's hard for them to attend because they move around a lot. The teachers are also from different backgrounds and not from the Gurjar community. The few who start school tend to drop out because they aren't interested, their families need them to work, they can't afford things like transport and uniforms, or they get married young.

== See also ==
- Punjabi tribes
- Gurjars in Kashmir
- Gurjars in Khyber Pakhtunkhwa
- Gurjars in Maharashtra
- Gurjars in Himachal Pradesh
- Gurjars in Uttarakhand

== Notables ==
=== Politics ===
- Fazal Elahi Chaudhry, Pakistani politicians who served as President of Pakistan from (1973–1978)
- Chaudhary Rehmat Ali, founder of Pakistan's independence movement
- Fayyaz ul Hassan Chohan, politicians from Rawalpindi

=== Literature ===
- Afarin Lahori, Punjabi poet from Lahore
- Ahmad Shah Gujjar, Punjabi poet
- Mian Muhammad Bakhsh, Punjabi poet from Gujrat
- Ghulam Rasool Alampuri, Punjabi poet from Hoshiarpure
- Sahir Ludhianvi, Urdu poet from Ludhiana
- Tariq Gujjar, Punjabi poet from Layyah

=== Military ===
- Sawar Khan, former four-star general of the Pakistan Army and Governor of Punjab from Rawalpindi
- Fazal Din, British army officer in 7th Battalion, 10th Baluch Regiment British army from Hoshiarpure
- Tufail Mohammad, Pakistan military officer from Hoshiarpure
- Kuldip Singh Chandpuri, Indian army officer from Sahiwal

=== Bandits ===
- Jagga Gujjar, bandit from Islamia Park, Lahore, Punjab, Pakistan

=== Cricket ===
- Shoaib Akhtar
- Wahab Riaz
- Haris Sohail

== Bibliography ==
- Singh, Mamta (2016). Gujjar kabile da Sabyachaar [Cultural Aspects of Gurjar tribe] (in Punjabi (Gurmukhi script)). Gracious Books, Patiala.
- Sukhadewa Siṅgha, Sekhoṃ (2003). Gujjara kabīle dā loka sāhita: Saṅkalana, khoja te wishaleshaṇa [The Folk Literature of the Gujjara Tribe: Collection, Research and Analysis] (in Punjabi (Gurmukhi script)). Wārisa Shāha Phāuṇḍeshana (Warisa Shah Foundation).
- Bīta de gujjarāṃ dā sabbhiācāra [The culture of the Gujjars of Bīta] (in Punjabi (Gurmukhi script)). Pabalīkeshana Biūro Pañjābī Yūnīwarasiṭī (Publication Bureau Punjabi University, India). 2010.
- Bharadwaj, A. N. (1994). History and Culture of Himalayan Gujjars. Jay Kay Book House.
- Sharma, J. C., (1984). "Gujars". In Muslim Peoples: A World Ethnographic Survey. Vol. 1. edited by Richard V. Weekes. Westport, Conn.: Greenwood Press.
- Ibbetson, Denzil (1916). Panjab castes. University of California Libraries. Lahore : Printed by the Superintendent, Government Printing, Punjab.
- Singh, Pritam; Thandi, Shinder S. (1996). Globalisation and the region : explorations in Punjabi identity. Coventry, United Kingdom: Association for Punjab Studies (UK). ISBN 978-1-874699-05-7
- Sohrdvi, Kamran Azam (2012). Gujjar Qabail - گجر قبائل [Gujjar tribes] (in Urdu).
- Azam, Kamran (2012). Encyclopaedia aqwam-e-Pakistan.
