= Gurjars in Maharashtra =

Ethnic group in Maharashtra state

Marathi Gujjars

Total population
- 55,735 [only Gujari speaking (2011 census)] (Note: There were 55,735, Gujari-speaking Gurjars in Maharashtra in 2011 census of India. These numbers does not include Gurjars who speak other languages.)

Regions with significant populations

Languages
- • Marathi (Note: Gurjar is a multilingual community in Maharashtra they speak Marathi, Gujari, and Hindi languages.) • Gujari • Hindi

Religion
- Hinduism (Vaishnavism)

Related ethnic groups
- Gurjar, Muslim Gurjars, Marathis
- Surnames: Chaudhari, Patil, Deshmukh Map of Maharashtra state in Western India.

Gurjars in Maharashtra are an ethnic community native to the Indian state of Maharashtra. They are descended from Gurjars who moved into this region during medieval times. They are mainly found in the Nashik, Pune, Amravati and Konkan divisions and scattered across eastern, western, and northern districts of Maharashtra. They are densely populated in Jalgaon, Dhule, Nandurbar, Nagpur, Amravati, Bhandara, Kolhapur, Satara districts, while Ratnagiri and Chandrapur districts have the smallest Gurjar population.

Almost all Gurjars in Maharashtra are followers of Hinduism and are part of the larger Marathi speaking community. They mostly follow Maharashtrian culture and festivals.

According to the 1931 census of British India, which was the last census to systematically count caste, the Gurjar population in the Maharashtra region was 7,115. Gurjars in Maharashtra belong to the land owning, agricultural and industrialist communities of the state. (Note: Gurjar is a landowning, industrlist and agricultural community of Maharashtra.)

== History ==
According to Romila Thapar, the Gurjars likely have origin from India. Place names in the Punjab region like Gujrat and Gujranwala districts, suggest they settled there. We also see Gurjar communities living in Kashmir. The presence of the Gurjar community in Maharashtra shows that they moved further south.

In Maharashtra, they are not original inhabitants of the region and they mostly came from the Indian states of Rajasthan and Gujarat in the 14th or the 15th century.

According to Bishakha Datta, Gurjars in Maharashtra have distinct culture tied to Rajasthan and Gujarat states.

During British rule and before the partition of India, the Chopda area in the Khandesh region of Maharashtra was under the rule of the Dode clan of Gujjars.

In Khandesh region good governance and low land taxes attracted many Gurjar farmers from Gujarat and Marwar (Rajasthan) to the region. Cotton farming grew fast, so they started farming more land that their families could manage. Migration was slow before 1850, but it increased a lot by 1864 because of the cotton boom during the American Civil War. The government's policy of settling Bhils led them to occupy land north of the Tapi Basin. While the Tapi plains were turned into cotton fields. These were actually fertile lands with bushes and trees. The Bhils live off the land and, unlike Gurjar farmers did not have the resources to turn land into a commodity. As commercial farming of wheat, cotton, and sugarcane grew, Gurjars expanded the land market. More land under cultivation created a shortage of farm labour.

In the 1860s, Nandurbar had a cotton boom. The British ryotwari system let farmers own land and pay tax directly to the state, so peasants benefited and landlords stayed weak. The first farming boom in Khandesh was also tied to Gurjars migrating from Gujarat from the 1830s onward. They took over most farmland in Shahada taluka and Nandurbar. Gurjars already lived in eastern Khandesh, but this new wave settled the northwest. Business communities like Parsis from Gujarat and Marwaris from Rajasthan also arrived around the same time.

1850s British records only mentioned that more land was being plowed. After Gurjars migrants settled and took over land in Khandesh region of Maharashtra, the British records began to mention a lack of workers. Gurjars took advantage of British laws and the fact that Adivasi did not understand Land ownership. By using lies, very high interest loans, and outright cheating, they pushed Adivasis into a state almost like slavery. For Bhil farmers in northwest Khandesh, things were different. The Land there was mostly owned by Gurjar landlords, not by small farmers. Earlier, Build were willing to work for them if they got clothing, food and little money. Even though Bhil farmers were earning more for working Gurjar landlords. Gurjar landlords used debt and legal loopholes to keep them dependent. By adding heavy charges to loans and controlling the accounts, landlords took the entire harvest and left Bhils with only basic food and clothes. Caste was very important in Khandhesh's history because it shaped how people worked and produced things before modern capitalism. The practice of tying labour to debt first started and became common between Gurjar landlords and Adivasis.

It is believed that Gurjars in Ratnagiri district and settled there almost a century ago. The Gurjars originally moved to Dhule district during the 1830s to 1880s from Gujarat state.

Before the arrival of Gurjars, Dhule was a Bhil-dominanted area. Over the next hundred years, the Gurjars slowly took over the Bhils' land and forced many of them into labour. The British land and tax laws helped them do this. In West and South India, the British made a deal directly with each farmer, called a 'Ryot'. They set a tax that each 'Ryot' had to pay in cash. This was how Adhivasi farmers first started using money. The village headman, called the Patil, collected the tax and basically became the government's revenue officer. The Gurjars were originally farmers. They settled in the Dhule district after British rule in the area.

Later Gurjars became village Patils and we're put in charge of collecting taxes. They were initially poor farmers but later became wealthy. They charged farmers higher rents than the British required and kept the extra for themselves. Over time, they lent money to Adivasi farmers who had to pay their rent in cash. When Adhivasi couldn't pay back the loans, the Gurjar Patils took their land. Adivasi ended up as sharecroppers or yearly contract laborers working for the Gurjars.

In Maharashtra, especially in Jalgaon and Dhule districts, there are still some caste-related conflicts between the Adivasi and landlord Gurjar communities in the areas. In 1969, a centre for the upliftment of the Adivasi in these areas was set up, called Adhivasi Bhil Seva Mandal. But as they started building as office, the rich Gurjar farmers destroyed around forty homes of the Adhivasi community in Suratwanti village.

The take over of Adivasi land got much worse around 1970-72. Because of the 'Green Revolution', the Gurjars started growing much more sugarcane. Since Gurjars controlled the local government loans support for Co-ops, fertiliser, machine , and seeds to themselves. All sugarcane factories in the Dhule district were owned by the Gurjars. Leaders of the Adivasi community believed court cases would not solve the conflict with landlord Gurjars. They felt the only way forward was to build large people's groups and carry out strong protest actions. The next phase of the struggle started on 30 January 1972. That day in Shahada, a large meeting of Bhil farmers took place. It was called the "Bhu Mukti Conference", which means "Conference for freeing the land". Later, in 1972 Bhil landless farmers started the Shahada movement against landlord Gurjars in Khandesh region at mass level.

Ambarsingh was an Adivasi, a Bhajan singer and Secretary of the Sarvodaya office in Shahada. One day his parents said that a boy had stolen cow dung cakes from a rich Gurjar farmer. The Gurjar farmers beat the Adivasi for this act and many Adivasi fled the village. That made Ambarsingh decide to act. Ambarsingh asked the Deputy superintendent of police for protection for Adivasis. Later he reached the S.P and asked him to investigate his village after the investigation. In investigation Eight Gurjars found guilty of harassing Adivasis and expelled, but Shahada court acquitted them. Ambarsingh saw these all and started to take meetings on his own in the village. He complained to the villagers. They all planned to build an office on government land in Shahada for filing their complaints. In retaliation 61 huts in Ambarsingh's village were burned. He spent one year seeking help from government officials and police but failed.

After the conference, strikes ran 17–27 April. Unlike 1973, in 1974 the Gurjar landlords ignored worker demands and vowed to crush the Shramik Sangathna. They lured leader Kumar Siralkar to talk, then attacked him. A fight followed - 20 Gurjars hurt, fewer Adivasis. Police arrested Siralkar and 138 Adivasis. After the fight, Gurjars asked Chief Minister of Maharashtra to ban the Shramik Sangathna and replace local people. Police forces in Shahada and Taloda doubled, with armed units added to forests. Backed by police, Gurjars rejected workers demands, told strikers "work on our terms or leave", and brought in outside labour, leaving local workers jobless. The government played both sides: it promised Adivasis it would fix land problems, but also backed the Gurjars who supported the Congress Party. The Maharashtra Home Minister visited Dhule district's Adivasi area in summer 1974. Sharmik Sangathana later help landless bhils. Their agitation got 4,000 acres of land taken by Gurjar landlords returned to tribal control.

The history of village Mankheda also has a common story from Shahada Taluka — Gurjars dominating and Bhils being oppressed.The story starts in the early 1900s with two Bhil brothers, Lakira and Fakira. They were said to have received a lot of land from the British Government, but most of it was not fertile. Around the same time, two Gurjar brothers, Ramu and Shyamu, moved to Mankheda with their widowed mother after their father died. They came to farm 5 partans (about 15 acres) of land that belonged to their grandfather. Shyamu, the younger brother born in 1911, studied till 4th grade while living with his grandfather. Over the years, the two brothers used their savings and help from relatives to buy 45 acres more partans (about 135 acres).

They also dug a well to irrigate much of their land. Ramu died without any children. When Shyamu died, his six sons inherited all his land. Each son got about 25 acres. For many years, Bhils worked for them as saldara. Jaysing Sonawene Bhil's grandfather, Ripa Bhil, worked for them for 25 years from 1945 - 1970. After that, Jaysing's father worked for them from 1970-1979. In 1979, the Government of Maharashtra gave 14 acres from Shyamu's large land to Ripa Bhil and his family members. By then, Shyamu's land had already been divided among his Three sons and his second wife.

After the National Emergency imposed by prime minister Indira Gandhi, from 1975 to 1977, the Progressive Democratic Alliance (Bihar) came to power in Maharashtra. This government has strong socialist views. It banned the saldari system. It also appointed special officers called mamledars to take action on their own against land grabbing. This included cases where Bhils took land from other Bhils, and cases where household goods were taken to pay off old debts. These cases were taken to court and solved within days. From the mid-1980s , the Sharmik Sangathana began losing support among the Bhils. This happened because the power of the Gurjars and other groups that exploited them had recused a lot.

== Demographics ==
Gurjars are mostly found in five divisions of Maharashtra: Konkan, Pune, Nashik, Nagpur and Amravati divisions. They are densely populated in the Khandesh region of Nashik division. Most Gurjar settlements are found in Jalgaon, Dhule, Nandurbar, Nagpur, Amravati, Bhandara, Kolhapur, Satara, and Ratnagiri districts.

Demographic distribution of Gujari speaking Gurjars across various districts of Maharashtra in 2011 census.

They are major landlords in different districts of the Khandesh region, especially in districts like Nashik, Nandurbar, Jalgaon and Dhule. In Dhule district alone they almost own 70 to 80% Land.

Nandurbar district has a total of six talukas. Out of these six, Gujjar are in the majority in three talukas: Shahada, Nandurbar and Taloda.

== Clan system ==
Gurjars in Maharashtra are divided into many clans, similar to Gurjars in other regions of Indian subcontinent. In Khandesh region of Maharashtra Gurjars are organised into various clans with distinct names, following a patrilineal system.

=== Clans ===
- Barot
- Rewa
- Reve
  - Reve Gurjars claimed their origin from Lahu Raja of and his found sons of Ranthambor in Rajasthan.
- Leva, Leve or (Laur)
- Badgujar
- Dor (Dore or Dode)
- Gayari
- Rangari
- Londhare
- Kadwa (Khadwa, Karwa or Khari)
- Khapda
- Suryavanshi
- Porvad
- Nema
- Umad
- Khadayata
- Shrimali

=== Dore Gurjars ===
Dode Gurjars are further divided into different subclans (kulas) these include:

- Pawar
- Chavan
- Simal
- Gehlot
- Kaba
- Khavi
- Solanki
- Chauthan
- Mori
- Nikumbh
- Toka
- Gohil
- Chavda
- Zala
- Dodiya
- Vaghela
- Huna
- Sukhate
- Padhikar
- Nimbol
- Deore
- Bhagesar
- Kagwa
- Banhol
- Dode
- Tobar
- Khaper
- Khichi
- Jadhav
- Makvane
- Barod
- Dabhi
- Harihar
- Gaud
- Javkhede
- Sakhele
- Bhatele
- Suryavanshi
- Borshi
- Kalumba

== Religion ==
In 'Maharashtra Gurjars', predominantly follow Hinduism, and some also follow Jainism. Most Gurjars follow Vaishnavism and belong to the Vallabhacharya sect of Hinduism. The exceptions are the Porvad, Nema, and Umad clans of Gurjars, who are Jains and called Srāvaks.

== Culture ==
=== Attire ===
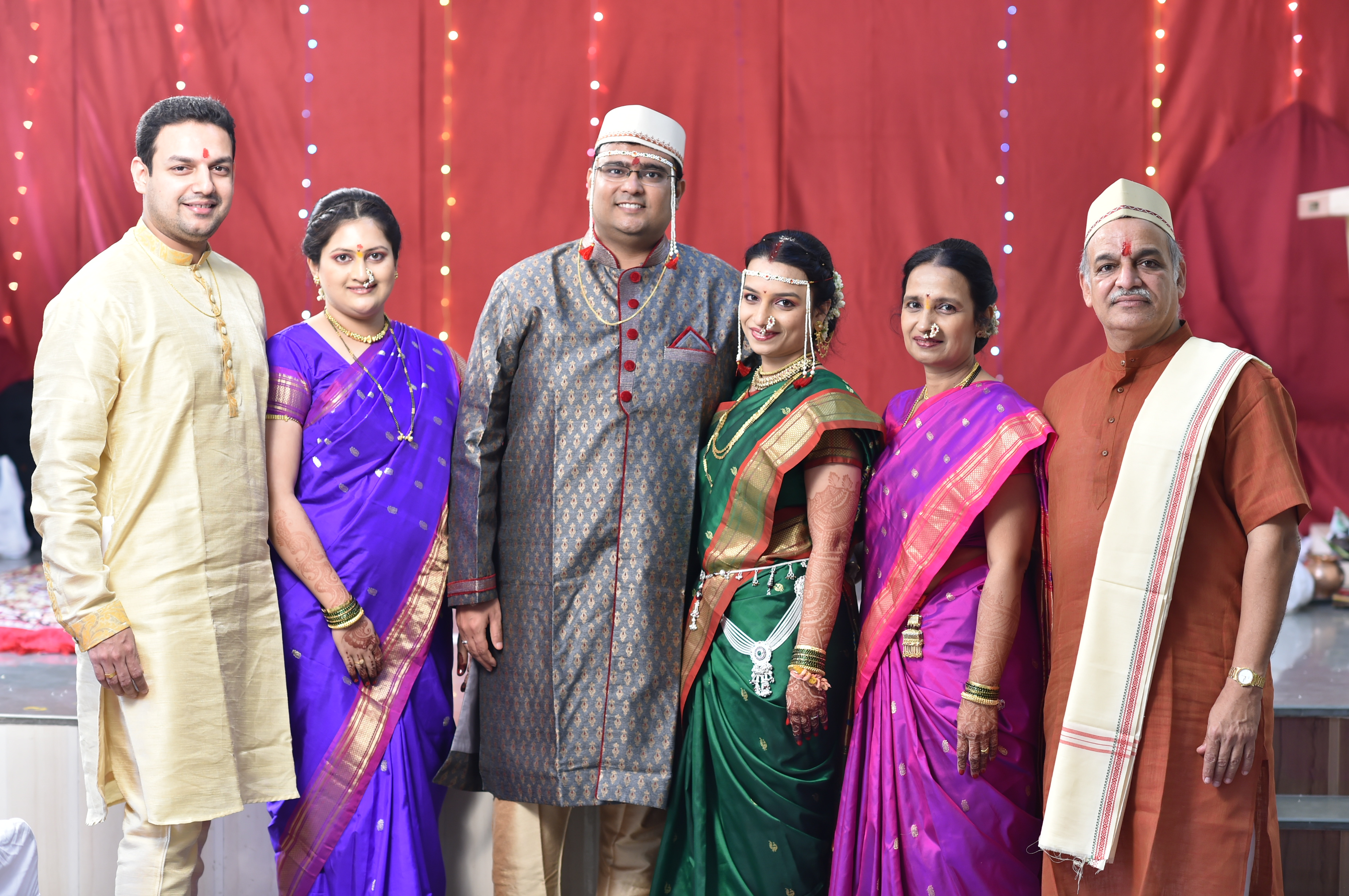
Traditional Maharashtrian Poshakh (Attire) of Men and women.

In Maharashtra Gurjar men traditionally, wore dhoti, shirt, and Pagri. Over time, their style changed. Nowadays, rural men often wear simple white pajamas, a white cap, and a long handkerchief. Gurjar Women typically wear 6 or 9-metre sari, draped with the pallav from right to left. Their wearing of saari style is similar to Marwadi and Gujarati women. Modern clothes like shirt-pant, safari suite s, and shoes are becoming more common, even in rural areas.

=== Food ===
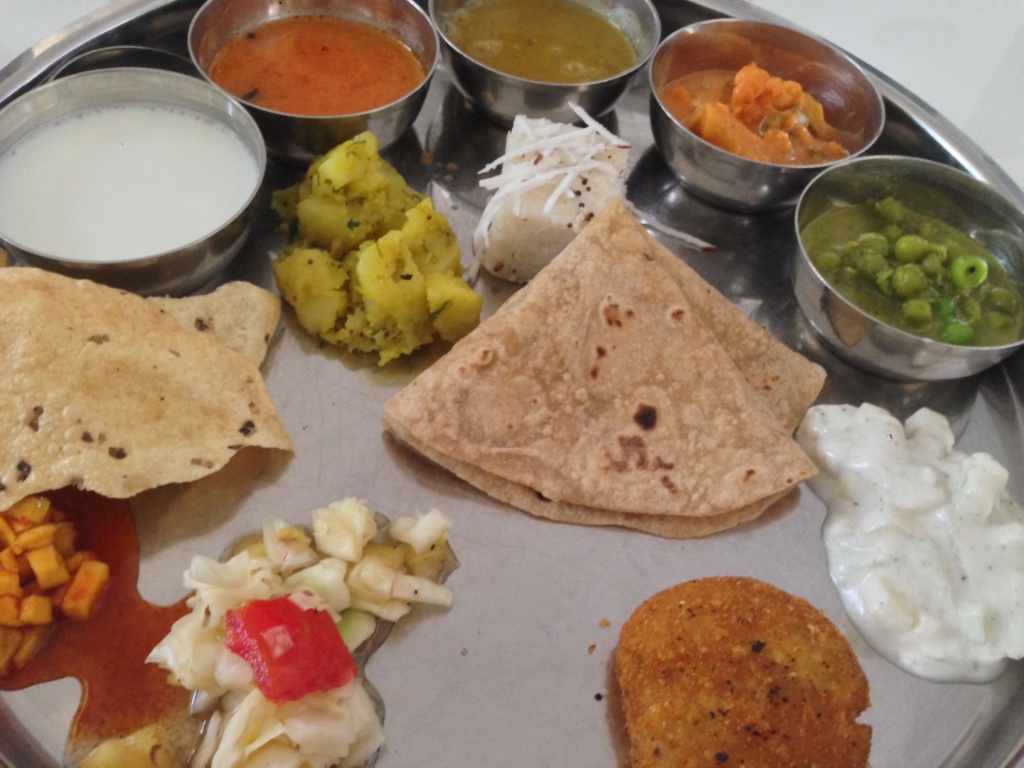
Typical vegetarian Maharashtrian Thali

Gurjar community eat similar food as others in Maharashtra, with both vegetarian and non-vegetarian options. They enjoy roti made from jowar, bajrra, or wheat, and dal rice on special days. Non-veg is common on Sundays. Some families are veg due to varkari influence. They also make special dishes like mande, puran poli, kheer, ladwe, and kanole for festivals like pola, Holi, and Akshay tritiya. Other treats include rasoi rice, bhajia, and dharya on naag panchami. Many of these dishes are unique to Gurjars and are cooked only in Gurjar families. Gurjars in Maharashtra are mostly vegetarians. For dinner they do not eat rice. Instead, they eat bread, lentils, and drink milk.

=== Family structure ===
In the Gurjar community of Maharashtra, joint families are common, with generations living together. A big family with 10-20 members is called a "Khatloo". Everyone in the family loves and supports each other, creating a strong bond. Childcare responsibilities are shared, making is easier to manage education, discipline, and care. The family head assigns tasks, and everyone pitches in. Elders guide the young, sharing their experience, while the senior woman handles guests, hospitality, and household duties.

=== Faith and belief ===
Marathi Gurjars are described as religious people who follow their faith. They have strong beliefs, including some superstitions. In the past, they believed in ghosts, magic, and demi-gods. Having a son is considered important among Gurjars. If a woman's children repeatedly died, they would be given unusual names like 'Bhikya' or 'Dhodhya' to ward off bad luck.

=== Marriages ===
Gurjars in Maharashtra follow the practice of endogamy and they don't marry within their own clan (kul). They don't take dowry in marriages, and the bride's family covers the wedding costs, so the groom's side doesn't have expenses. Thei weddings happen at the bride's place. Gurjars also allow window to remarry, so there's no social restriction on it.

==== Cousins marriages ====
In Maharashtra, the Gurjar community generally doesn't practice cousin marriages, standing for avoiding cross-cousin marriages. recently the Gurjar caste council allowed an exception, but only after intense debate and under certain restrictions.

=== Festivals ===
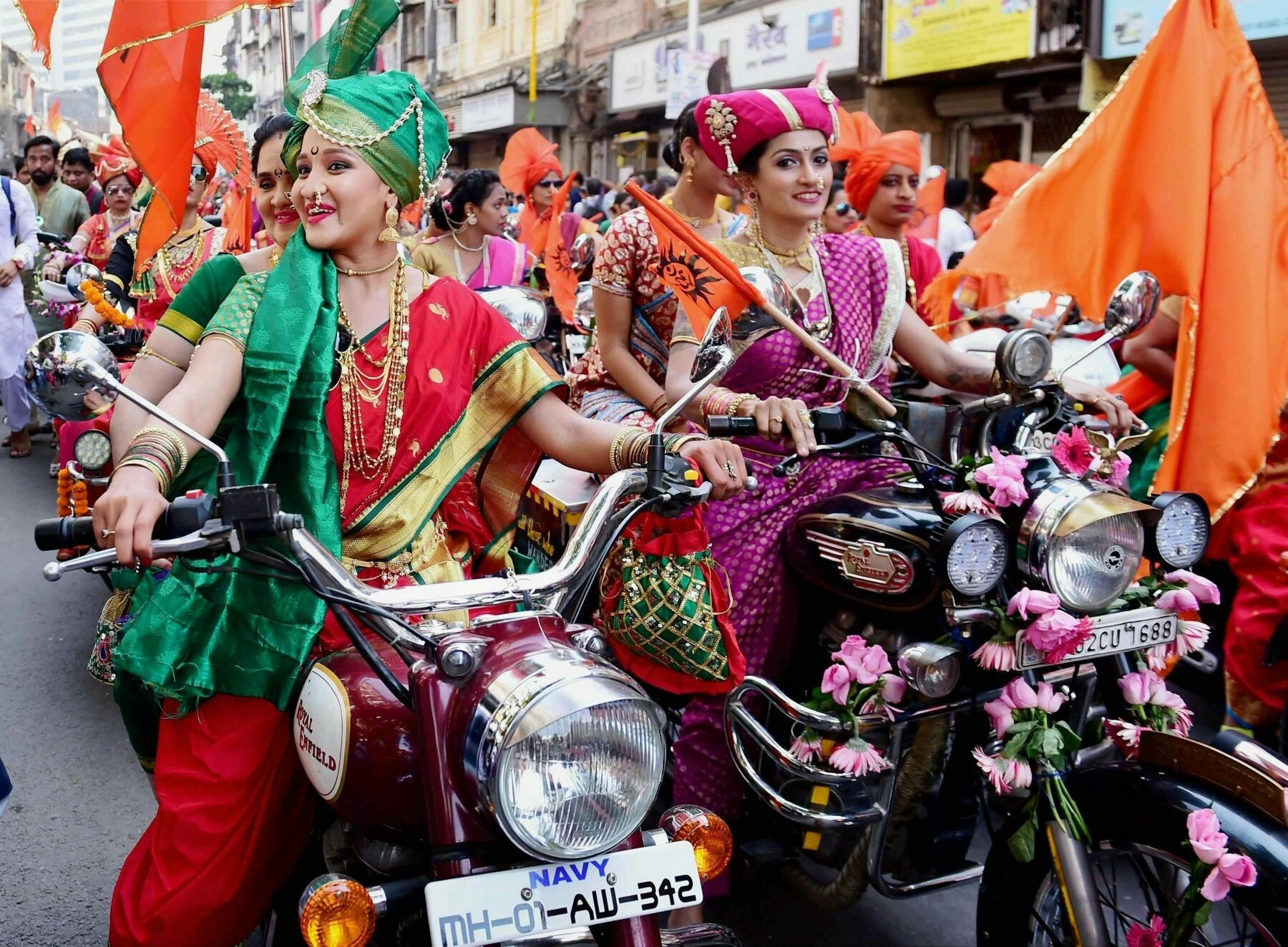
Padwa festival of Maharashtra.

Hindu Gurjars celebrate different festivals with enthusiasm, but their way of celebration is unique. Their traditions are influenced by where they live, so there's similarities and differences. Rich and poor alike celebrate festivals, showing their strong religious beliefs. The Hindu year starts with Chaitra, but June is a big month for students and farmers. For Maharashtrians, the year begins with Ghudhi Padwa and other festivals includes Akshay Tritiyor Akhaji also celebrated in these days. Hindu Gurjars mainly celebrate festivals including Vat Pournima, Raksha Banshan, Holli, Diwali, Hartalika, Rishi Panchami, Dashahara, Makar Sankranti, and family rituals like Munja, Veer, Jawool, Kanubai, Aasara, and Gulabai.

== Social status ==
The Gurjars of Maharashtra were classified as Other Backward Classes (OBC) under the Indian government's general reservation scheme of positive discrimination.

In 2024, the National Commission for Backward Classes (NCBC) under the BJP government announced the inclusion of 19 castes from Maharashtra in central OBC list. These communities include 5 Gurjars clans (Badgujar, Suryavanshi Gujar, Leve Gujar, Reve Gujar & Reva Gujar) along with Lodha caste, and Pawar/Powar castes.

== Occupation and businesses ==
=== Occupation ===
The main occupation of the Gurjar community in Maharashtra is agriculture and livestock, but now they're also focusing on education, doing government jobs and regional politics. Some Gurjars also work as traders and moneylenders, like the Gujarati Banias and Marwari communities.

In Maharashtra Gurjar farmers keep horses. They ride them to visit their crop fields.

According to 2013 findings, In Maharashtra 56.14% Gurjars were cultivators, 15.07% were farmers cum agricultural laborers, 9.19% were agricultural laborers, 14.37% were in government jobs, and 5.23% were in business.

A 2016 study of three villages in Nandurbar district, Maharashtra — Ambegaon, Anand Nagar and Mankheda — found that 100% all Gurjar men in these villages work only on their own farm land. The same study found that 100% all Gurjar women in these villages do only household work and childcare.

=== Businesses ===
Many shops and local businesses in Nandurbar district are owned by the Gurjars, especially in Shahada, Nandurbar and Taloda talukas. Out of 33 grocery and cloth shops, Gujjars own 3. All 3 fair price grain shops are also under Gujjars management. For medical stores, there are 2 in total and 1 belongs to a Gujjar. Among 15 hotels, the 3 most popular are owned Gurjars besides these, Gujjars also own 5 grinding mils, 10 pan-bidi shops, 20 saloons, 10 goldsmith shops, and 20 tailoring shops.

== Literacy rate and Education ==
=== Literacy rate ===
The literacy of Gurjars in Khandesh region of Maharashtra is 82.18% in Jalgaon, 85.88% in Dhule, and 79.86% in Nandurbar districts. The total literacy rate for the entire Khandesh is 77.71%.

In the 2011 census of India, the literacy of Gurjars in Khandesh region was 72.46%, and recently it has increased to 77.71%.

=== Education ===
According to a 2018 study, in Maharashtra, almost (81.80%) Gurjars finished high school. Only 18% study beyond that, and just 10% were college graduates. Their education level were generally low, even with a good literacy rate. More females than males finish secondary school, but fewer female pursue higher education.

As per 2016 findings from three villages in Nandurbar district — Ambegaon, Anand Nagar and Mankheda — Gurjar men had the following levels of education: 4% had 1-5 years of schooling, 54% had 6 to 8 years of schooling, 26% were graduates, and 16% had diplomas and vocational training.

The same study found that in these villages, about 12% of Gurjar women had 1 to 5 years of schooling, 14% had 6 to 8 years of schooling, 53% had 9 to 12 years of schooling, 18% were graduates and 3% had diplomas and vocational training.

== Population ==
The 1931 British Indian census, the final one that recorded caste in detail, counted the Gurjar population in the present-day Indian state Maraharashtra as 7,115.

The 2011 Indian census counted 55,735 Gurjars in Maharashtra who speak Gujari as their mother tongue. This total excludes Gurjars speak Marathi or other languages.

=== District wise population ===
Districts wise Gurjar population per 2011 census in Maharashtra.

2011 census
Districts	Population
Jalgao	35,236
Nandurbar	26,776
Dhule	5,580
Kolhapur	245
Nashik	199
Thane	157
Pune	149
Aurangabad	95
Raigarh	54
Sangli	44
Nagpur	38
Solapur	29
Amravati	22
Akola	23
Nanded	20
Satara	20
Mumbai Suburban	17
Yavatmal	10
Sindhudurg	10
Jalna	9
Washim	9
Buldhana	8
Chandrapur	7
Latur	6
Wardha	3
Gondiya	3
Ratnagiri	3
Gadchiroli	1
Osmanabad	1

== Politics ==
In Marathwada and western Maharashtra, Maratha people are more involved in local politics. After Marathas, the Gurjars and Lingayat are the most important groups among the intermediate castes in the local politics of these regions. Gurjars and Maratha are dominant communities in the local politics of Dhule district in Maharashtra, but caste conflicts between them have kept them from joining forces to protect their shared interests. Traditionally, Marathas backed the Indian National Congress Party, while Gurjars backed the Janata Party. In Dhulia, the Janata Party was mostly run by local Gurjars and led by the area's biggest landowner. That party led attacks on the Shramik Sangathana movement. The movement survived because the local Janata Party couldn't get support from the Government of Maharashtra.

In the 1967 Maharashtra Legislative Assembly election of Maharashtra Vidhan Sabha in Nandurbar district out of a total of sixteen seats Gujjar candidate won a total of 10 seats. Out of total 10 general seats Gujjar won 8 seats. One reserved seat for women was won by a Gujjar woman. The seat for cor-poorative society was also won by a Gujjar candidate.

Jalgaon district has 11 legislative assembly constituencies, which means 11 seats. There are 7 town places and about 14 (tehsils) in all. The total number of voters was 9 lakh and a little more in the district's 11 constituencies. Marathas formed the biggest group with around 3.5 lakh voters. Gujjars and Malis were next, with about 1.5 lakhs voters each. Dhangars had more than 80,00 voters, and Muslims had a somewhat smaller number of voters.

After a violent massacre of Adivasis in 1984, the state government of Maharashtra even set up a committee to look into the Janata Party's role in it. The Congress government in the state was mostly led by the Maratha community. It was likely unfriendly toward Gurjars because Gurjars had migrated from Gujarat and were seen as outsiders in Maharashtra. Later in Shahada, Maharashtra in Dhule district, the Gurjars were seen as oppressors.

One Gurjar leader Purshotam K. Patil also known as P.K Patil, was known for trying to create a private army for landlords in the 1980s. He started his career in 1969, he built many corporative organisations and helped bring the Gurjar community closer together. He was a big deal in Janta Dal party, but lost his seat in 1990. He blamed Sharad Anantrao Joshi for his loss in the election.

In Vitner area of Maharashtra, a Gurjar women named Indrabai Patil fought for women's property rights in her area. She later became the sarpanch and worked towards empowering women.

== Notables ==
- Prataprao Gujar, commander-in-chief under Maratha Empire
- Shalinitai Gujar: Indian politicians from Thergaon region in Pune, Maharashtra
- Girish Mahajan: politician from the Jalgaon district, Maharashtra

== See also ==
- Gujari
- Gurjars in Kashmir
- Gurjars in Punjab
- Gurjars in Khyber Pakhtunkhwa
- Gurjars in Himachal Pradesh
- Gurjars in Uttarakhand
- Marathi people

== Bibliography ==
- Patil, Dilip N. (2005). History and Short stories of Gujars [गुजरांचा इतिहास आणि लोककथा] (in Marathi).
- Deogaonkar, S.G (2013). महाराष्ट्रातील निवडक जाती आणि जमाती [Selected Castes And Tribes In Maharashtra] (in Marathi) (2 ed.).
- Thakur, Vikramaditya (13 October 2014), Rangarajan, Mahesh; Sivaramakrishnan, K. (eds.), "Logjam: Peasantization Caused Deforestation in Narmada Valley", Shifting Ground: People, Animals, and Mobility in India's Environmental History, Oxford University Press, doi:10.1093/acprof:oso/9780198098959.003.0010, ISBN 978-0-19-809895-9
