= Laur (clan) =

Gurjar clan

Laur, Lava, Lor
- Jāti: Gurjar (Gujjar)
- Religions: Hinduism, Sikhism
- Languages: Gujari, Punjabi, Gujarati, Haryanvi, Marwari and Hindi
- Country: India, Pakistan
- Region: Gujarat, Rajasthan, Haryana, Sindh
- Lineage: Gurjar
- Related groups: Gurjar clans

Laur, (also spelled Lava, Lavi or Lor) is a major clan of the Gurjar ethnic community of northern India.

Gurjars are divided into two groups in Gujarat and Rajasthan: the Khari and the Laur (or Lava). These two are further subdivided into a number of clans.

== Background ==
Lava and Khari Gurjars are equal in status. However, Laur Gurjars typically regard themselves as inferior to Khari or Khadwa Gurjars, and thus sometimes disregard intermarriage.

== Ethnography ==
Laur Gurjars are found in Gujarat and Rajasthan, including the Ahmedabad, Rajkot and Girnar districts of Gujarat state and Bharatpur, Jaipur, Alwar, Kota, Karoli, Jodhpur, Jaisalmer, Mewar, Sirohi districts of the state of Rajasthan.

== Subclans ==
Laur clan have over twenty sub-clans, some of which are listed below:

- Chechi
- Doi
- Khatana
- Nekari
