= Ghulam Rasool Alampuri =

Punjabi poet and saint (1849–1892)

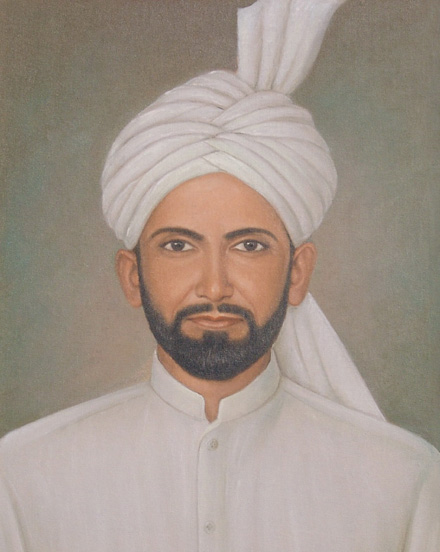
- Born: 29 January 1849; Alampur, Hoshiarpur District, Punjab
- Died: 7 March 1892 (aged 43); Alampur, Hoshiarpur District, Punjab
- Occupation: Poet

Ghulam Rasool Alampuri (Note: Punjabi: غلام رسول عالم پوری) (29 January 1849 – 7 March 1892) was a 19th-century Punjabi Muslim Sufi poet and author. He authored a rendition of the Yusuf-Zulaikha folktale in 1873.

== Biography ==
Ghulam Rasool was born on 29 January 1849 into a Gujjar family from the village of Alampur in Hoshiarpur District. He was only six months old when his mother died and was only 12 years old when his father died. He received primary education from Maulvi Hamid Sahib of his village. He worked as a school teacher in Meerpur (a village in present-day Haryana), from 1864 to 1878. His formal teaching profession ended in 1882 at his resignation from his last school in Mahesar. He died young at an age of 43 on 7 March 1892. Unlike many other Punjabi poets, Ghulam Rasool was not affiliated with any Sufi order.

== Works ==
Several minor works of Ghulam Rasool were collected as Satt phull (“Seven flowers”). However, his fame rests chiefly on his two major works. First is Dāstān-i Amīr Ḥamza, a lengthy epic based on the life of Hamza, the uncle of prophet of Islam. It was completed in 1869, when he was only twenty. Second is Aḥsan al-qaṣaṣ, based on the long popular romance of the Yusuf and Zulaikha, and completed in 1873.

== Legacy ==
One PhD in Patiala, India, and two PhDs in Punjab, Pakistan, have been awarded on his life and works. At his 119th death anniversary, seminars were organized in Punjab of both Pakistan and India. In Pakistan, a seminar organized by Pakistan Academy of Letters (PAL), a book written on him by his grandson Masud Ahmed was inaugurated.

In 2014, his shrine got media attention in India when the owner of the land, who had taken the adjoining land on lease from the Waqf Board, refused to allow passage to Alampuri's grandson who had come from Pakistan to visit the grave of his grandfather.
