= Siege of Ranthambore =

Siege of Ranthambore may refer to:

- Siege of Ranthambore (1291), which the Delhi Sultanate ruler Jalaluddin Khalji withdrew and retreated
- Siege of Ranthambore (1299-1300), Ulugh Khan and Nusrat Khan of Delhi sultanate were defeated by Chahamana generals.
- Siege of Ranthambore (1301), in which the Delhi Sultanate ruler Alauddin Khalji defeated the Chahamana king Hammiradeva
- Siege of Ranthambore (1568), in which the Mughal emperor Akbar defeated Surjan Hada

== See also ==
- Ranthambore (disambiguation)
