= Meelu =

Meelu, (also spelled) Melu, Meehlu or Meeloo is a prominent clan of the Indian and Pakistani Gurjar ethnic community.

== Distribution ==
The Meelu (Mehlu) Gujjars are the followers of Hinduism, Sikhism, Islam and they live in Indian Punjab, Himachal Pradesh, Haryana, Jammu Kashmir, Azad Kashmir, Pakistani Punjab, Balochistan, Khyber Pakhtunkhwa and Gilgit Baltistan.
