= Jagga Gujjar =

20th century Lahore bandit

Jagga Gujjar جگا گجر
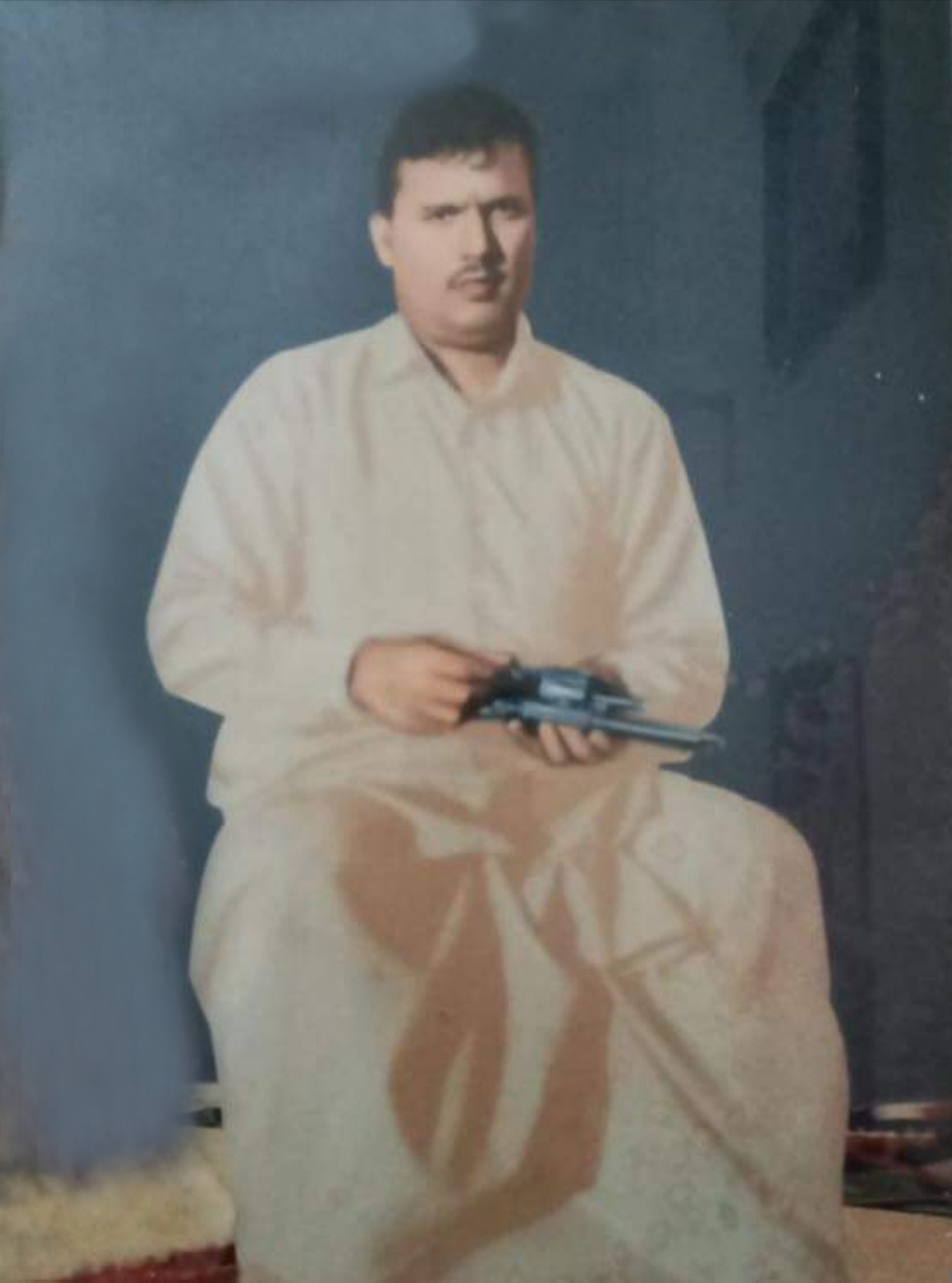
- Jagga Gujjar in 1968
- Born: Chaudhry Muhammad Sharif Gujjar c. 1940; Lahore
- Died: 3 July 1968; Lahore, Punjab, Pakistan
- Known for: Introducing 'Jagga Tax'
- Opponent: Achha Shukar Wala
- Parent: Chaudhry Bhuddha Khan Raees Gujjar

Jagga Gujjar (born Chaudhry Muhammad Sharif Gujjar; c. 1940 - 3 July 1968) was a bandit in Lahore, Pakistan during the 1950s and 1960s. He is notable for the tax he imposed on the rich called 'Jagga Tax', using that money for the welfare of the poor. He was a resident of Lahore's area Islamia Park, near Chauburji.

== Release from jail ==
Gujjar was released from the jail on early parole in January 1968. By that time, General (Retd) Muhammad Musa Khan had become the governor of West Pakistan. When he came out of the jail, he was received by a large crowd at the city's Mozang Chowk.

He got married after coming out of the jail.

== End ==
After coming out of jail, Gujjar organized a gang and started collecting forced tax from the butcher community. This tax got the name of 'Jagga Tax'. In Pakistan, even today this type of tax is called 'Jagga Tax'. The center of his highhandedness was Lahore's Bakra Mandi (cattle market) area where he collected rupee one (Re 1) from every butcher on purchase of one goat. Finally, Gujjar along with his accomplice Raju Gujjar was killed in an encounter with police near his home in Nawan Kot area of Lahore in July 1968. The next day's newspapers published the news of his murder very prominently. The police party who killed them was given Rs 300 in reward. Fateh Khan Bandial was Lahore's deputy commissioner while Haji Habib ur Rehman, superintendent of police at that time.

== In popular culture ==
Name Jagga was already being used in the titles of Punjabi films before Gujjar's death like 'Jagga' (1958). After his death, a number of Punjabi language movies were made on topic of Gujjar starting from 1970s by the Lahore's film industry. Some of films having either Jagga or Gujjar in their titles included 'Bala Gujjar' (1973), 'Jagga Gujjar' (1976), 'Wehshi Gujjar' (1979), 'Gujjar', 'Jagga Tay Shera' (1984), 'Putar Jaggay Da' (1990), 'Jagga Tax' (2002) and 'Buddha Gujjar' (2002). Some of these movies were made by the family members of Jagga Gujjar who entered in the film business after he was killed. The noted film makers of this family include Chaudhry Miraj Din and Chaudhry Imtiaz Gujjar. It is interesting to note that their rival family had entered the business of movie making much before them and also made a number of good films. Famous film makers of the rival family include Achha Shukar Wala himself and Kamran Chaudhry. Their most famous was 1965 film Malangi. Both the families have since ended their enmity.
