= Ranthambore =

Ranthambore may to refer :

- Ranthambore National Park, a national park in northern India
- Ranthambore Fort, a fort within the Ranthambore National Park
- Ranthambore Express, superfast train service in Indore and Jodhpur
- Ranthambore railway station, a railway station in Sawai Madhopur district, Rajasthan

== See also ==
- Siege of Ranthambore (disambiguation)
