= Meerpur =

- village
- Location within Madhya Pradesh Location within India
- Coordinates: 23.2765156°N 77.3008506°E
- Country: India
- State: Madhya Pradesh
- District: Bhopal
- Tehsil: Huzur
- Elevation: 513 m (1,683 ft)

Population (2011)
  - Total: 14
- Time zone: UTC+5:30 (IST)
- ISO 3166 code: MP-IN
- 2011 census code: 482462

Meerpur is a village in the Bhopal district of Madhya Pradesh, India. It is located in the Huzur tehsil and the Phanda block.

== Demographics ==
According to the 2011 census of India, Meerpur has 3 households. The effective literacy rate (i.e. the literacy rate of population excluding children aged 6 and below) is 40%.

Demographics (2011 Census)
	Total	Male	Female
Population	14	9	5
Children aged below 6 years	4	1	3
Scheduled caste	10	8	2
Scheduled tribe	0	0	0
Literates	4	4	0
Workers (all)	9	7	2
Main workers (total)	4	4	0
Main workers: Cultivators	0	0	0
Main workers: Agricultural labourers	0	0	0
Main workers: Household industry workers	0	0	0
Main workers: Other	4	4	0
Marginal workers (total)	5	3	2
Marginal workers: Cultivators	0	0	0
Marginal workers: Agricultural labourers	0	0	0
Marginal workers: Household industry workers	0	0	0
Marginal workers: Others	5	3	2
Non-workers	5	2	3
