= Baba Mohan Ram =

Hindu folk deity

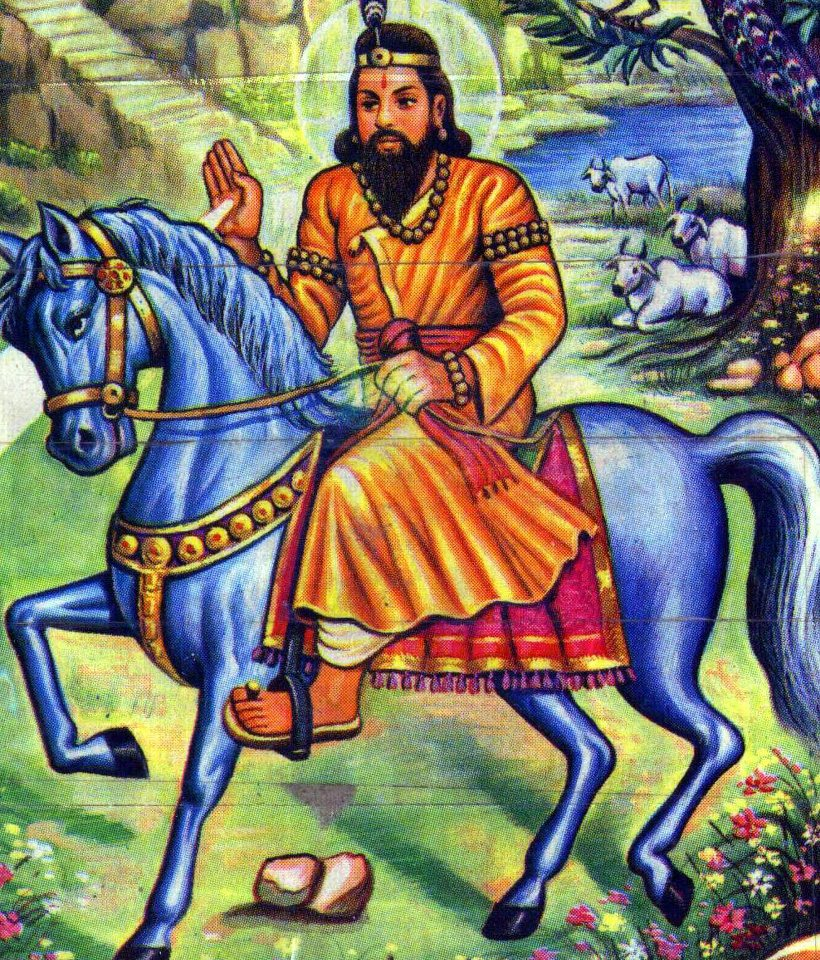
- The deity depicted riding his blue horse at Kali Kholi
- Affiliation: Vaishnavism
- Abode: Kali Kholi
- Day: Dwitiya (द्वितीया ) also known as Doj
- Color: Blue
- Region: Haryana, Rajasthan, Uttar Pradesh
- Temple: Cave of Baba Mohan Ram, Kali Kholi, Bhiwadi; Milakpur
- Festivals: Doj (Dvitiya) Mela, Dhulandi (Holi), Phalguna Doj, Bhadra Doj

Baba Mohan Ram (Hindi: बाबा मोहन राम) is a Hindu deity. He is considered by his adherents to be an avatar of the deity Krishna, who appeared during the Dvapara Yuga.

== Iconography ==
Head Adornments: Central to his appearance is a prominent gold crown encircling his head. His locks are embellished with a striking peacock feather, evoking a celestial elegance and representing divine sovereignty.

Facial Features: His countenance embodies a blend of Krishna's charm and celestial luminescence, characterized by a serene yet radiant visage akin to the glow of the moon. The serenity and magnetic appeal of his face draw devotees to his divine presence.

Garland: Draped around his neck is a resplendent garland crafted with pearls and a sacred rudraksha bead, symbolizing purity, spiritual depth, and divine protection.

Mount - Blue Horse: Baba Mohan Ram is often portrayed riding a majestic blue horse, believed to embody the manifestation of Shesha, the divine serpent. This equine form signifies strength, agility, and spiritual transcendence.

Attire: Typically attired as a Brahmin, he is adorned in simple yet dignified clothing, reflecting humility and spiritual connection. Wooden slippers adorn his feet, representing groundedness and simplicity amidst divine grandeur.

Baba Mohan Ram is primarily worshipped in his distinctive divine form, characterized by intricate details. However, his blessings manifest in various divine incarnations. For instance, when granting blessings to Pandit Nandu, Baba Mohan Ram appeared as Vamana, embodying the divine essence of a celestial child.

In another instance, Baba Mohan Ram revealed himself to Pandit Kanha in a different divine form—a captivating child accompanied by lions, signifying strength and grace, adorned with enchanting brown dreadlocks.

Additionally, near the sacred Kali Kholi pond, devotees experienced a vision of Baba Mohan Ram as Shri Krishna, engaging in divine leelas with the gopis. This multifaceted display of forms showcases Mohan Ram's diverse appearances, each bestowing unique messages and blessings upon his devotees.

== Nomenclature ==
Shri Mohan Ram is regarded by devotees as a manifestation of Krishna in the Kali Yuga, the current age according to Hindu cosmology. The name "Mohan" is associated with an "enchanting" or "captivating" quality traditionally attributed to Krishna. While Krishna is traditionally considered an incarnation of Vishnu, some traditions hold that Shri Mohan Ram represents a distinct manifestation of Krishna specifically for the present era.

Baba Mohan Ram is associated in devotional tradition with qualities attributed to both Krishna and Rama. He is venerated by followers as a symbol of love, righteousness, and devotion.

According to this belief, Shri Mohan Ram's appearance in the Kali Yuga serves as a beacon of spiritual guidance and a source of divine inspiration for devotees. His divine attributes, mirroring the eternal values of truth, righteousness, and compassion, resonate with seekers of spiritual enlightenment in the modern era.

Baba Mohan Ram, celebrated for his allure akin to Lord Krishna and the moral values akin to Lord Rama, holds a revered place in Hindu mythology and spiritual narratives. His divine presence serves as a reminder of the eternal teachings and the timeless virtues embedded within Hindu philosophy, attracting devotees seeking spiritual solace and enlightenment in the contemporary world.

== Meeting the Divine ==
=== Pandit Nandu ===
According to legends, he manifested in the Milakpur hills, where a Brahmin named Nandu used to herd cow. Nandu was deeply devoted to Lord Shri Krishna, and his unwavering faith in the deity was evident as he constantly meditated upon Krishna's feet. Over time, his devotion intensified, and his primary activities involved tending to cow and worshiping Lord Krishna.

Witnessing Nandu's unshakable faith, Lord Krishna decided to reveal himself. He orchestrated a divine play where a cow would visit Nandu's cow regularly. As Nandu attended to his herd during the day, the cow would join them, but in the evenings, when Nandu led his cow down from the hills, the cow would mysteriously move in a different direction, away from the other cows.

Curious about the cow's behavior, Nandu decided to follow it one day. He observed the cow entering a cave, and he followed it inside. Within the cave, he discovered a radiant sage immersed in deep meditation. Recognizing the sage's divine aura, Nandu bowed in reverence.

The sage, affectionately addressing Nandu, welcomed him and expressed his delight at Nandu's year-long care for the cow. The sage bestowed upon Nandu a boon, offering to fulfill any wish he desired. However, Nandu humbly expressed that the sight of the sage itself was more than enough for him.

The sage, with a gentle smile, insisted that Nandu accept a blessing. He declared Nandu as his foremost devotee, assuring him that whoever sought blessings in his name at Nandu's behest would have their desires fulfilled. This pledge extended through seven generations of Nandu's lineage, ensuring the presence of the sage's devotees for ages to come.

Baba Mohan Ram became synonymous with fulfilling the wishes of those who approached his devotees with reverence and seeking blessings. His legacy continues to be revered, perpetuating the belief in his divine presence and his ability to grant blessings to the faithful.

=== Pandit Kanha ===
In the village of Aalupar, there lived a prominent cow owner known for his fierce demeanor. Residing with him was Pandit Kanha, who tended to his cow and managed household chores. Pandit Kanha, deeply devoted to Baba Mohan Ram, engaged in regular worship and revered the deity immensely.

One day, the cow owner instructed Pandit Kanha to deposit money in the nearby town. As the day passed and the task completed, nightfall loomed, with the journey back possibly traversing through a dense forest. Fearful of the wild animals, the cow owner ordered Pandit Kanha to delay the return until the next day. Enraged by this order, the cow owner subjected Pandit Kanha to severe punishment, including walking barefoot on a path laden with thorns and stones, causing injuries.

Amidst this ordeal, Pandit Kanha fainted. In a dream-like state, he encountered a divine figure resembling a young boy radiating a celestial glow. The apparition consoled Pandit Kanha, revealing its true identity as Baba Mohan Ram, promising to visit Pandit Kanha's home at midnight.

Overwhelmed with joy and gratitude, Pandit Kanha eagerly awaited Baba Mohan Ram's arrival. True to the promise, at midnight, a disguised Baba Mohan Ram appeared at Pandit Kanha's doorstep. Prostrating before the deity, Pandit Kanha and his wife performed elaborate rituals and expressed their devotion.

Impressed by their devotion, Baba Mohan Ram extolled the virtues of love and devotion over rigid religious practices, narrating instances from various historical eras where simple devotees attained divine presence through pure love and faith. Baba Mohan Ram guided Pandit Kanha to a sacred spot beneath a banyan tree, where he discovered invaluable divine artifacts.

In adherence to Baba Mohan Ram's teachings, Pandit Kanha performed daily worship of these artifacts. However, faced with opposition from his wife, he attempted to dispose of them. During the disposal, he encountered a ferocious lion, which led to his wife's fainting due to fear.

Witnessing these events, Pandit Kanha's beliefs were reinforced, and he continued to devoutly worship the divine artifacts, emphasizing the significance of love and faith in spiritual devotion.

=== Sekhu Mirasi ===
Sekhu Mirasi, a humble cowherd in a serene village, encountered a sage whose divine aura bestowed upon him a legacy of melodies. Though initially silent, it was an encounter with Mohan Ram that unlocked Sekhu's gift, weaving celestial verses into songs of cosmic wisdom:

"निराकार ज्योति स्वरूप जाने दिये ब्रह्मांड रचाय अजी यू पानी से पैदा करे बन्दे तू वा पैदागर न धाय"

His melodies reachedaudiences, interested in soirtual and philosophical themes, symbolizing cosmic harmony, and revealing the interconnectedness of existence. Sekhu Mirasi's songs remain a part of his musical legacy.

== Veneration ==
Baba Mohan Ram's Cave is in the mountain of Kali Kholi, in Bhiwadi, where his akhand jyoti (eternal fire) is present. Devotees come in large numbers during the Doj and the Chemai Doj (Six Month Festival). Devotees offer ghee to his akhand jyoti, which removes their problems, and they offer bhog and uppla (cow dung cake) to his ever lasting dhuni, which also cures all the problems caused to his devotees. According to legend, the temple is surrounded by miracles and divine energy, and any service that people do there benefits them, like sweeping the temple floor, donating food to poor, providing water to the bird feeders, and feeding animals, especially cows. The temple is surrounded by trees and birds of various species. It is said that the deity commanded his devotees to build a temple in his name in the village of Milakpur, where his first devotee, Nandu Ji, lived.

== Festivals ==
Baba Mohan Ram's fairs are held around Holi and Raksha Bandhan, while smaller gatherings take place on the second lunar day of each month called Doj. Devotees from Rajasthan, Haryana, Uttar Pradesh and Delhi visit the fair.

In March 2026, a three day fair at the temple was expected to attract more than one million devotees with around 900 police and home-guard personnel deployed for security.
