= Nekari =

Muslim community in India

Nikari People
নিকারী

Total population
- Bangladesh 85,000; India 70,000

Regions with significant populations
- Bangladesh (Khulna District); West Bengal (North 24 Parganas, South 24 Parganas)

Languages
- South Bangali or Rarhi (native); Standard Bengali (mostly spoken as an L2)

Religion
- Sunni Muslim

Related ethnic groups
- Mahimal Mahifarash Bengalis

The Nekari, also known as Nekri, Nikari (Bengali: নিকারি) or Nikeri (Bengali: নিকেরি), are a Muslim community found in northeast India, particularly in South Bengal. In Bengal the Nekari are part of the fishing community.

== Origin ==
The community is traditionally associated with selling fish. According to their traditions, the community gets its name from the word Urdu work nek, which means honest, and kar meaning living, so the Nekari literally means those who make an honest living. Alternatively, it may stem from the Persian word nek, which means good; in which case Nikari means 'doer of good work'. There is some evidence to suggest that the community are converts from the Hindu Jele caste. The Nekari are found mainly in the district of 24 Parganas, in particular along the banks of the rivers Ischamati and Raimangal. They speak Bengali and belong to the Sunni sect of Islam.

== Present circumstances ==
Nikaris are mainly Muslim wholesalers of fish and fruit. They mainly fish in the Sundarbans region. A majority however are now daily wage labourers. They are strictly endogamous, and marry close kin. Their customs are similar to those of other Bengali Muslim communities.

== See also ==
- Mallaah
