= Afarin Lahori =

Punjabi poet

Faqirullah Afarin Lahori, commonly known as Afarin (Punjabi: آفرین لاہوری, c. 1660 – d. 1741), was a Punjabi poet from Lahore, which until about 2 years before his death was part of the Mughal Empire, some of the time being the capital of the empire. He wrote many books during his lifetime of 81 years, especially remembered for his romantic epic poem, "Nāz o nīāz", also known as Hīr o Ranǰha in which he wrote the traditional Punjabi story of Heer and Ranjha, who lives in Takht Hazara by the river Chenab in Punjab, Heer Ranjha into a poem. Most of his work is in Punjabi, with the exception of the book "Kuliyate Afarin (Kuliyate)", written in Persian.

Faqirullah is revered throughout the Punjab, Hazara and Kashmir. He maintained good relationships with local scholars and Mughal officials before opting for a secluded life. His work earned respect from contemporary and subsequent writers and poets.

== Early life ==
Faqirullah Afarin Lahori was born in c. 1660 in Lahore, Punjab during the Mughal Empire, into the Juya clan of Punjabi Shia Muslim Gujjars. He was probably born in Lahore, although the original place of origin is uncertain. Although a Sufi by nature, he was not affiliated to any Sufi order, and spent a life of seclusion at Lahore.

== Poetic works ==
The "Kuliyate Afarin" is considered his masterpiece. In its ending verses, Afarin Lahori listed major genres of Punjabi poetry and his predecessor Punjabi. His Mathnawis attained much fame were;

- The Kuliyate Afarin (Kollīyāt) is a comprehensive collection of Faqirullah Afarin Lahori's works. The first volume contains his lyrical poetry and a selection of his panegyric verses. The forthcoming second volume will include an additional 38 panegyrics.
- The Nāz o nīāz, also known as Hīr o Ranǰhā, composed in 1707 during the lifetime of sixth Mughal emperor Aurangzēb.
- The Anbān-e maʿrefat was written in 1730 during the rule of thirteenth Mughal emperor Muhammad Shah.
- The Abīad-e fekr was written in 1734 during the reign of Mughal ruler Moḥammad Shah.

== Sources ==
- Ahmad, Z.; Kirmani, W. (1983). "Āfarīn Lāhūrī". In Yarshater, Ehsan (ed.). Encyclopædia Iranica. Vol. I/5: Adat–Afghanistan. London and New York: Routledge & Kegan Paul. ISBN 978-0-71009-094-2.
- Kia, Mana (2020). Persianate Selves: Memories of Place and Origin Before Nationalism. Stanford University Press. ISBN 978-1-5036-1196-2.
- Delhi, Library of Congress Library of Congress Office, New (1992). Accessions List, South Asia. E.G. Smith for the U.S. Library of Congress Office, New Delhi. p. 1085.
- Geiger, Wilhelm; Kuhn, Ernst (2011). Litteratur, Geschichte und Kultur, Register zum II. Band (in German). Walter de Gruyter. p. 253. ISBN 978-3-11-084120-6.
