= Poswal =

Poswal, Poruswal, or Paswal is a clan of Gujjar ethnic group, who mainly reside in North India, Pakistan and Afghanistan.

== Famous people from this clan ==
- Mian Muhammad Baksh
