= Panjpeer Shrine =

The Panjpeer (literally: five peers) shrine in Abohar, Punjab, India is a dargah dedicated to the five peers who are said in local legends to have destroyed the ancient city of Abunagar that formerly occupied the place now known as Abohar. The shrine is considered holy by members of various religions.

== Legend ==
In the twelfth century, King Hari Chand was the ruler of Abunagar. The king fell ill with leprosy, and was advised that only the holy blood of the horses of the Panjpeers of Multan could cure his disease. With the king was on the verge of death, his only daughter decided to go to the Panjpeers. She stole the 81 horses of the Panjpeers and brought them back to Abunagar. Unfortunately, the king had succumbed to the disease before she could return. The Panjpeers sent requests that their horses be returned, but the princess refused, so the Panjpeers traveled in person to Abunagar to plead for their return. Again, in spite of many humble requests by the Panjpeers, the princess refused to give back the horses. Thus angered, the Panjpeers destroyed the place with their holy powers. Due to their curse the region became deserted.

== Devotions ==
Devotees offer kheer, chaddar, salt and milk. A huge fair is held every year on the 15th of Sawan.
