= Doi (clan) =

Doi clan of the Gujjar ethnic group found in Pakistan, Afghanistan and India

Doi Doi
- Ethnicity: Gujjar
- Location: Pakistan, India, Afghanistan
- Descended from: Khatana
- Language: Punjabi, Hindko, Urdu, Hindi, Gujjari, Pahari, Koshur

Doi is a Punjabi sub-clan of the Gujjar ethnic group of Pakistan, Afghanistan and India.

Families related to this clan speak many local languages (including Kashmiri, Punjabi) and this clan is found in Punjab, Azad Kashmir, Khyber Pakhtunkhwa and Islamabad regions of Pakistan. In India they are found in Rajasthan, Madhya Pradesh, Jammu and Kashmir, Himachal Pradesh, Uttar Pradesh and Delhi. They are a sub-clan of the Khatana Gurjars.
