= Khatana =

Gujar clan in South Asia

- Ethnicity: Gujar
- Location: Pakistan, India, Afghanistan
- Language: Punjabi, Hindko, Urdu, Hindi, Gujjari, Pahari, Koshur

Khatana (کھٹانہ) is a sub-clan of the Gujar ethnic group found in India, Afghanistan and Pakistan. They follow different religions, such as Hinduism, Islam, and Sikhism.

== Offshoots ==
Khatana Gujars have many sub-branches/sub-sections such as:

- Awana
- Kunduana
- Amrana
- Bukkan
- Bhand
- Topa
- Gajgahi
- Debar
- Doi
- Thilas
- Jangal
- Lohsar

== Geographic distribution ==
They are found in all regions and provinces of Pakistan, including Punjab, Sindh, Balochistan, Khyber Pakhtunkhwa, Hazara, Gilgit-Baltistan, Azad Kashmir, and Islamabad Capital Territory.
