= Gurjars in Khyber Pakhtunkhwa =

Ethnic group in Khyber Pakhtunkhwa

په خیبر پښتونخوا کې ګجر

Total population
- 1,21,510 (1931 census) (Note: These figures excluded data from British Administrated Tribal Areas (later Federally Administered Tribal Areas) and princely states of Chitral, Dir, Swat, Amb, and Phulra.)

Regions with significant populations
- (Pakistan) Khyber Pakhtunkhwa

Languages
- L1: Pashto, (Note: Gurjars speak various languages in Khyber Pakhtunkhwa as their mother tongues, including Pashto, Gujari, Hindko Khowar, and additional languages Urdu and Punjabi.) Gujari, Hindko, Khowar (native languages); L2: Urdu, Punjabi (additional languages)

Religion
- Sunni Islam

Related ethnic groups
- Gurjar, Muslim Gurjars, Punjabi Gujjars, Awan
- Titles: Khan, Malik, Khaghan, Sardar, Chaudhary, Mian

Gurjars in Khyber Pakhtunkhwa, Gurjaras in Khyber Pakhtunkhwa, Gujjars in Khyber Pakhtunkhwa or Gujars in KPK, (Note: Locally in Khyber Pakhtunkhwa they are also known as Gurjara, Gujara, Gujar, Gujjro, Gojar, or (Gujar qawm / ګوجر قوم). Pashto: (په خیبر پښتونخوا کې ګجر); Gujari: (خیبر پختون خواہ ماں گرجر); Hindko: (خیبر پختونخوا اچ گرجر); Khowar: (خیبر پختونخواہو گوجر لو)) are an ethnic community native to the Khyber Pakhtunkhwa (formerly NWFP) province of Pakistan. They are descended from Gurjars who moved into this region during classical period. They are scattered across almost all districts of Khyber Pakhtunkhwa: They are densely populated in Mansehra, Swat, Haripur, Battagram, Malakand, Torghar, Bajaur, Swabi, Upper Chitral, Lower Chitral, Abottabad, Buner, Upper Dir, Lower Dir, Kolai-Palas Kohistan, Lower Kohistan, and Peshawar districts, while Kurram, Khyber, and Dera Ismail Khan districts has the smallest Gujjar population.

Gurjars are an important ethnic group in Khyber Pakhtunkhwa. In terms of population, they rank after the Pashtuns and Awans. The majority of Gurjars in K.P.K speak both Pashto and Gujari as their mother tongues. A significant population of Gurjars also speak Hindko as their mother tongue. Some also speak Khowar as their mother tongue.

In K.P.K they are part of the larger Hindkowan and Pashtun linguistics communities of Khyber Pakhtunkhwa. The majority of Gurjars in Khyber Pakhtunkhwa belong to agricultural and settled communities of the province. (Note: In K.P.K Gurjars are mainly involved in agricultural activities.) Some are also nomads; these tribal or nomad Gujars are further divided into Ajar and Shapunkis subgroups. (Note: There are also some tribal Gurjars in Khyber Pakhtunkhwa known as Ajars and Shapunkins.)

The Gurjars are believed to be the original and oldest inhabitants of the Swat valley, the Hindu Kush mountains, Malakand District, Peshawar, and the Hazara region of Khyber Pakhtunkhwa.

According to the 1931 census of British India, which was the last census to systematically count ethnicity/tribe, the Gurjar population in the Khyber Pakhtunkhwa region was 1,24,510. They were predominantly Muslims and constituted 15% of the total population of the Hazara region.

In the northern regions of Pakistan, there are almost one hundred one clans or Khels of Gurjars, out of a total around forty-five Gurjar clans scattered across the Hazara region of Khyber Pakhtunkhwa. Gurjars in Khyber Pakhtunkhwa live in isolation and do not marry outside their own community. (Note: Gurjars of Khyber Pakhtunkhwa mostly marry within their own community.)

== History and origin ==
=== Origin ===
Gurjars are considered the first people to live in the Hazara region of Khyber Pakhtunkhwa. They are believed to have been living there even before the arrival of Islam.

Gurjars in the Hindu Kush mountain of Khyber Pakhtunkhwa are likely the original inhabitants of the area. Another theory is that they have originated from the Punjab region. Linguistics similarities between the Gujari and Punjabi languages also suggest that their origin lies in Punjab. They first settled in Punjab around the 6th century. In the 7th century, they moved to mountain valleys northwest in the northwest of the Indian subcontinent. Today they live in mountain areas from Uttar Pradesh In the east to the Hindu Kush mountain in the west.

The Gurjars of Swat and Mardan districts in Khyber Pakhtunkhwa, as well as those in Kashmir and eastern Afghanistan, claim that they are originated from the larger region of Punjab.

According to Syed Jabir Raza, the ancestors of the Gurjars likely lived in this region before the Afghans settled in the Peshawar plain. As the lowland areas became occupied, they gradually moved to the nearby hills that were more accessible. This theory was also supported by the scholar Abdur Rehman.

According to Fedrik Barth, Gurjars likely came to Swat state about 400 years ago. Kohistanis were the first to settle in Swat, while Pashtuns gradually settled in the area between 11th and 16th centuries.

According to Alain Mario Viaro and Inam-ur-Rahim, their origin is linked with Gurjars of Punjab and their Gujari language has some affinities with Punjabi.

According to scholar Wayne E. Losey, a considerable number of Pashto and Gujari speaking Gurjars emigrated from the Dir area and settled in Haripur district in the late 20th century.

=== History ===
As per the old inhabitants of the Mittikot village in Mansehra district, Baba Ransi Ullah, an elder who belong to Bakarwal community, was the first to settle in the village. Afterward, the Bakarwals invited Dedar Gurjars to come to Mittikot for protection and defense. Following this, the other Gurjars clans — the Khatana, Chechi, Kohli, and Thekri Gurjars — also arrived and made their homes in Mittikot.

In 1849, the British government took control of all parts of Mansehra. While the Western Pashtun tribes agreed to British rule, the Gurjars chose to fight against Britishers. The fighting caused heavy losses on both sides. Many Gurjars men were killed, and the Pashtuns also lost a large number of people. After about 18 months, the Gurjars and Pashtuns made a brotherhood pact and joined together to fight the British government. In these battles, they lost nearly 70,000 soldiers, but they were still willing to continue the fight. At that time, James Abbott was working as the commissioner of both Mansehra and Abbottabad. The British government pulled out of Mansehra but held on to full control of Abbottabad. Because of their heavy losses, the British government divided the Hazara District into three tehsils. Mansehra was placed under Gurjar rule, Abbottabad remained under British rule, and Haripur was placed under Pashtun rule.

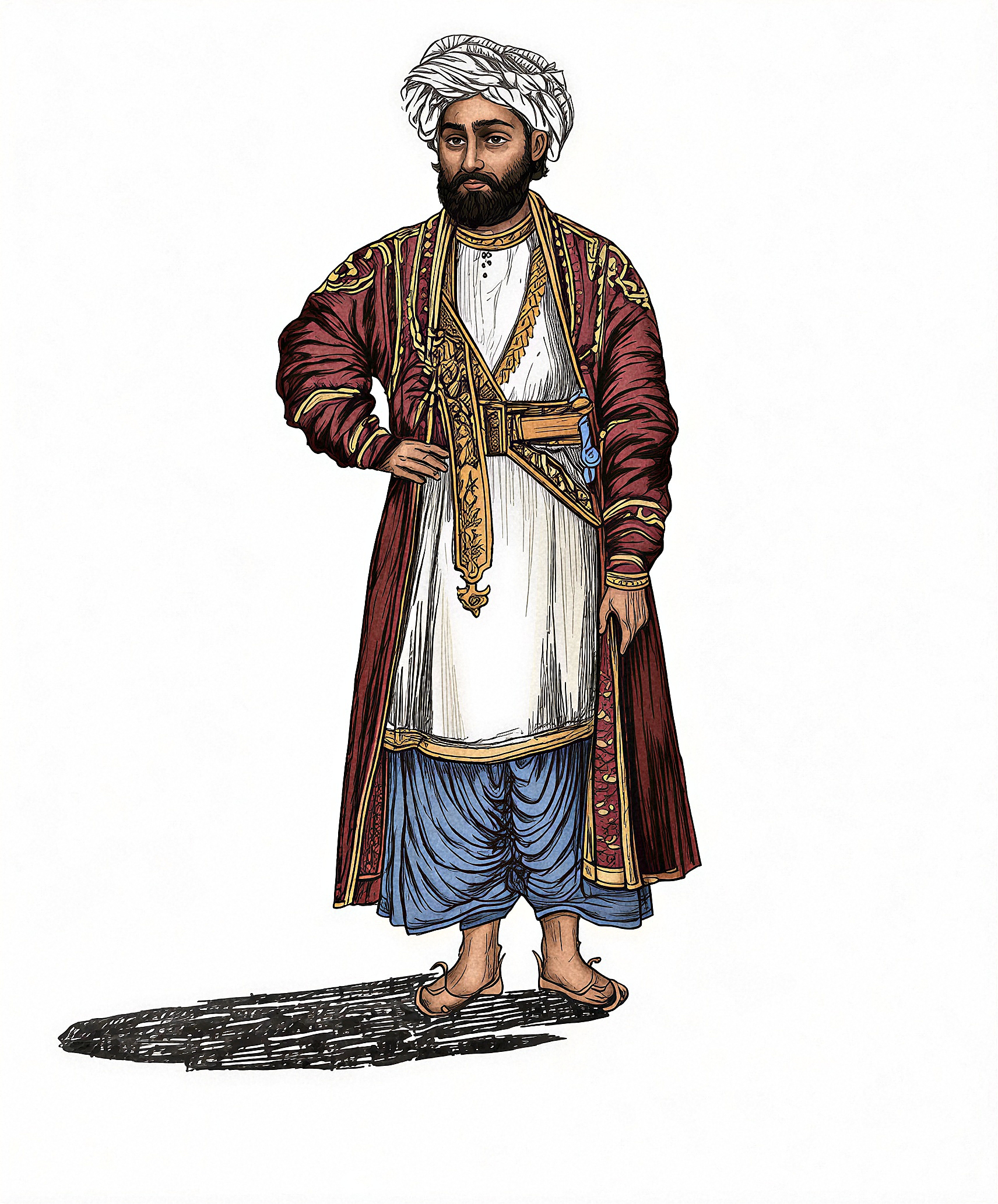
Muqaddam Musharaf, a Gurjar ruler of Kotnajibula in Hazara region, Khyber Pakhtunkhwa.

In the early 18th century, a Gujjar of the Khatana clan in the Hazara region of Khyber Pakhtunkhwa was the chief of Jagir of Kot Najibula. Later, he lost his Jagir to Tareen tribe. In the 18th century, Ranjit Singh, the founder of the Sikh Empire, again granted Muqaddam Musharaf, the Jagir of Kot Najibula consisting of eight villages in the Hazara region in exchange for 15,000 rupees. The villages comparised Kokalia, Pandori, Jharr, Dedra, Dingi, Chamba Pind-Gujran, Kot Najibullah and some other. After the death of Muqaddam General Sir James Abbott gave the Jagir to his son, Mir Muqaddam Ahmad. Mir Ahmad died on 12 October 1849. After Ahmad's death, Jagir was given to his elder son, Mir Ghulam Muhammad. Ghulam Ahmad died on 1 May 1880, and later his jagir was given to his elder son, Mir Abdullah.

== Divisions ==
In Khyber Pakhtunkhwa, the Gurjars are divided into many named patrilineal tribes, called Khels or clans. There are often myths about how a clan started, and these stories are usually used to explain the meaning of the clan name. Gurjar clans vary in size, and only small clans live in one area. Family ties are based on short, father-line groups. Gurjars with the same clan name feel a stronger bond, even if they are not directly related. Among Gurjars, the clan does not determine marriages, and Gurjars strictly marry within their own community.

In northern Pakistan, there are almost 105 clans or Khels of Gurjars, out of a total around 45 Gurjar clans scattered across the Hazara region of Khyber Pakhtunkhwa. In swat, they share similar clan groups with the Gurjars of Punjab.

=== Subgroups ===
Gurjars in Khyber Pakhtunkhwa are divided into two major Subgroups Ajars and Shpankiyans to nomadic class of the Gurjars.

==== Ajars ====
Ajars are a subgroup of the Gujjars of Khyber Pakhtunkhwa. They raise sheep and goats. In summer, they move with their livestock to the upper valleys of KPK.

==== Shapunkis ====
Shpankiyans or Shpankiyans are a subgroup of the Gujjars of Khyber Pakhtunkhwa.

=== Clans ===
- Khatana
- Awan (Awana)
- Bajwal
- Bajjar
- Bajral
- Beema
- Bhatti
- Barwal (Baharwal)
- Chachi
- Dedar (Dedhar)
- Kohli
- Thekri
- Dhodi
- Gaursi
- Gidar
- Qambhar
- Jarah (Jharah)
- Janghar
- Katarian
- Killah
- Barwal (Baharwal)
- Bagar (Burgat)
- Kushan (Kasana)
- Chechi
- Jaghal (Jagal)
- Gorsi
- Sarju
- Katharis
- Nekari (Nikadi)
- Hakla
- Tota Khel
- Dora Khel
- Jagar Khel
- Kana Khel
- Kalu Khel
- Chauhan
- Poswal (Paswal)
- Khttan khel
- Poswar
- Thakar
- Thakarya (Thikariya)

== Demographics ==
Gurjars in Khyber Pakhtunkhwa are mainly found in the Malakand, Swabi, Peshawar, Buner and Hazara divisions. They are almost found across all valleys of Khyber Pakhtunkhwa, especially in the Siran, Dir, Shishikoh, Swat, Golen, Miandam, Madaklasht, Mankial, Alexander valley, Patrak, Naran, Kaghan, three Kalasha valleys, Palas valley, and Gabral valley.

Distribution of Gujari-speaking Gurjars in various districts of Khyber Pakhtunkhwa.

A large settlements of Gurjars in Khyber Pakhtunkhwa found in the Mansehra, Malakand, Haripur, Abbottabad, Buner, Swabi, Battagram, Torghar, Chitral, Dir, Swat, and Upper Kohistan districts.

They own a good amount of land in the districts like Malakand, Haripur, Abbottabad, Dir, Swat, and Mansehra. In Mansehra district alone, they own almost 25% of the district's land.

== Religion ==
Almost all Gurjars of Khyber Pakhtunkhwa are the follower of Islam religion and they belong to the Sunni sect of Islam.

== Population ==
In the 1931 census of British India, the total Gurjar population in present-day Khyber Pakhtunkhwa province was 1,21,510. This figure excluded British Administrated Tribal Areas (later Federally Administered Tribal Areas) and princely states of Chitral, Dir, Swat, Amb, and Phulra. Almost all of them were Muslims, with fewer less than 150 being Hindus.

=== Historical population ===
Population of Gurjars recorded in different census reports of the British India for North-West Frontier Province (now Khyber Pakhtunkhwa, Pakistan).

Historical population
Year	Pop.	±% p.a.
1901	108,000	—
1911	113,571	+0.50%
1921	85,590	−2.79%
1931	121,510	+3.57%
source: 1901 census - 1911 census - 1921 census - 1931 census

== Culture ==
=== Dwelling ===
Most Gurjars in Khyber Pakhtunkhwa live in "pacca" (concrete) houses. Some who live in mountain areas also have kachcha or temporary houses. Gujjar houses are usually simple huts made of concrete, wood, or sometimes mud. Each house generally has two rooms - one for people and one for guests or their livestock. Some mud-made houses have walls made of rough, irregular stones without mud plaster.

In the mountain areas of Swat valley in Khyber Pakhtunkhwa, houses of Gurjars and Pashtuns live in temporary Kuchha houses. These houses are built on man-made terraces that follow the slopes. The houses are arranged in rows. This layout places them near farmland and makes irrigation easier. In narrow valleys, Ajars and Gujars often keep livestock inside their houses. Their dwellings typically consist of one room for the family and stored fodder, and another for livestock.

A 2008 study conducted in Hilkot watershed, a small water catchment area in Mansehra, found that 23% of Gurjars have pakka or concrete houses and 77% have kaccha houses. Same study also found, that among Gurjars, the average home size was 4.75 marlas.

=== Food ===
Gurjars in Khyber Pakhtunkhwa follow a simple diet they mostly eat roti (chapati) an unleavened bread made from grain flour.

=== Marriages ===
==== Endogamy ====
In KPK, Gurjars live in relative isolation and do not enter into marriages outside their own community. Within Gurjar community, clan affiliation does not determine marriage partners. Marriage is strictly practiced within the Gurjar community.

=== Language ===
In Khyber Pakhtunkhwa, the Gurjars are a multilingual community. They speak three major languages as their mother tongues, Pashto followed by Gujari and Hindko. Some Gurjars in Upper and Lower Chitral Districts also speak Khowar as their mother tongue. Additional languages like Punjabi and Urdu also spoken by Gujars. Gujari as mother tongue is approximately spoken by 2,50,000 Gujjars of Khyber Pakhtunkhwa.

== Education and literacy rate ==
A 2008 study conducted in Hilkot watershed, a small water catchment area in Mansehra, found that average literacy rate in the area was found to be about 46.7%. Among Gurjars, the average literacy rate was 49% for male members and about 33% for females members.

== Land ownership and disputes ==
=== Land ownership ===
In Khyber Pakhtunkhwa, most land is owned by Pashtuns and Gurjars, and owning land also means access to forest resources. To encourage tree planting, the Forest Department of Khyber Pakhtunkhwa offered a deal: landowners plant trees, get free seedings and money for care, and after 5 years they can cut and sell the timber. Most people choose fast-growing eucalyptus. The problem is, the policy assumes everyone owns land, so people without land can't benefit from it. In Mansehra district alone, they own almost 25% of the district's land.

In some areas of Swat and Gabral valleys they also own a good amount of land, however they don't have ownership over forest resources.

=== Land disputes ===
Gurjar farmers in Balakot tehsil have a long history of fighting for land rights. During British colonial rule, land settlements favoured only Syed and Pashtuns landlords. Their struggle led to the Tenancy Laws of 1939 and 1957, which gave more protection to farmers. In the 1970s, Gujjars supported the Pakistan People's Party, but we're disappointed when it did not carry out promised land reforms or support them during Kissan movement in 1974. In Shishikoh valley of Upper Chitral District Gurjar community has a rivalry with the Khowar, Pashtun and Persian communities of the area over the control of forest resources. As the Gurjars mostly live in forest areas, they have taken control of large areas of forest land by force and have an advantage over other communities. Because of this conflict, the communities have filed cases in the local High Court to claim ownership of the forest areas. These conflicts have divided the communities of Shishikoh valley into rivalry groups and weakened social ties. The ongoing court cases over ownership have added to the economic burden of poor communities.

In Swat valley, Gurjars living on the Eastern bank of the Swat River claimed ownership of the lands they occupied. However, in the past the ownership of these lands was already disputed between the former rulers of Swat (princely state) and local Khans. Most of these disputed lands were located on Mount Illam. During the government of Zulfikar Ali Bhutto, land in six villages near the Swat River in Swat Valley was mainly purchased by tenant tribes, including Ajars and Gujars. However, land disputes between Pashtuns and Gujjars still persist in these areas. Almost 8% of Gujjars now own land that they purchased in Swat Valley. In villages such as Gado, Gujars and Ajars own 33% of the land, 15% in Dadahara, and 3% in Koza Bandaier the merger of Swat State, restrictions on the sale of land to non-locals were lifted. Changes in land ownership were recorded during the period of 1971-77, with land purchases in Mingora by non-locals and hillside land purchases by tenants (Ajars) and Gujars. Gujars employed overseas used remittances to purchase land in Mingora, Swat. This land was sold by Pashtuns to resolve land disputes. Pashtun landowners later became confined to the valley floor around their households, while hillside lands were largely purchased by tenants, Gurjars, and Ajars. Land prices increased after the Zia-ul-Haq regime due to competition among remittance earners. Tenant and Gurjars ownership of hillside land led to more effective management than tenancy. Market expansion and cash crops brought marginal lands into cultivation, while fertile urban land was lost to construction.

According to a claim of the Badakhshi people of the Madaklasht valley in Lower Chitral District, Muzzafar ul-Mulk Mehtar, the last ruler of the Katoor dynasty, took land from the Badakhshi people in the villages of Kotik, Balpanch, Shalik, and Kawash, and gave it to tribal Gurjars. The Gurjars received the land on the condition that they would pay Qalang, which was a tax for grazing their livestock.

Gurjar and Akazai tribes also had land disputes in some areas of Mansehra and Torghar Districts. In September 2018, the administration of the Torghar district held a local Jirga to resolve a land dispute between the Gurjars and Akazai tribe of Pashtuns in the districts of Torghar and Mansehra. The Guejars filed a case in the Senior Civil Judge's (SCJ) court, and after the court's order Gurjars were permitted to harvest their wheat and grass crops on the disputed land. As a result of the court order, 90% of the disputed land in Torghar district was given to the Gurjars. In 2023, Haji Zarin Khan chief of Gujar Qaumi Movement (GQM), said in Malakand district that the local government was trying to remove Gurjars from their own land in the name of land settlement process of the Government of Khyber Pakhtunkhwa. He further said local landlords and the government wanted to seize Gurjar land. He stated that Gurjars have owned land and properties in Malakand district for centuries and that no one can take their land away.

== Occupation and economy ==
=== Occupation ===
In terms of occupation, the Gurjars are one of the diverse communities of Khyber Pakhtunkhwa, and they have many different occupations. The main occupations of the Gurjars in Khyber Pakhtunkhwa are Agriculture, dairy farming, hunters, carpet weavers, and labours. In KPK, some Gurjars so work as tenants or labour for other groups. Many settled Gurjars do own land. However, only a few men are educated, and very few hold important positions outside their own village.

The Gurjars of Upper and Lower Chitral Districts work as Hunters. They depend on hunting wild animals and eating wild fruits to make a living, and they follow this practice as a hobby. In Kaghan Valley, the Gurjars produce very fine blankets, through the designs on those blankets are quite simple. The making Nakhai, pile-carpets, and other similar items is a highly skilled occupation, and Gurjars along with many other people work in this trade. In Swat valley, some Ajars, Gujars, Kohistanis, Khatak, and Mohmand belong to tenants groups.

In the Taar and Mulkhow areas of Upper Chitral District of Khyber Pakhtunkhwa, the occupations of the Gurjars have changed. Most of them now work as Shopkeepers, transporters and Construction workers. This change is due to an increase in literacy rate and education among communities of these areas.

In recent decades many Gurjars found jobs in big cities across Pakistan and overseas. The money they sent home helped families feel less worried about poverty. In the Islamabad Capital Territory, many Gurjars who migrated from Khyber Pakhtunkhwa mainly work as Imams or Maulvis in local mosques. Gurjars of Northern Pakistan traditionally held important religious positions in Islamabad. Many also work at Agricultural Development Bank in G-7 sector of Islamabad.

=== Economy ===
In Khyber Pakhtunkhwa, the Gurjar economy is mainly based on agriculture and herding live stocks. Along with livestock they also grow grains, maize, wheat, or millet on their own land. They grow these grains on small farms in high-alitide areas, or they trade butter, meat, and wool to get them. To meet their basic needs, two subgroups of tribal Gurjars — Ajars and Shpankiyans — live in two different ways: transhumance, where they move seasonly with animals and nomadism, where they move from place to place more frequently.

In Khyber Pakhtunkhwa, Gurjars, Ajars and Kohistanis communities often go for hunting. Their hunting activities cover fishing, catching birds that migrate, and tracking both plant-eating wild animals. Kids and teens usually hunt birds and other small wild animals using a traditional slingshot known as a "Leenda". Gurjars in the forest areas of Mansehra district depend a lot of forest resources. They use wood for fuel and for building their houses.

The mountain areas of Malakand are used by landowners, tenants, and Gurjars for grazing livestock and for collecting shrubs used as fuel, cattle bedding, and roof thatching. High demand on forest resources has led to disputes between different groups over access rights. This continued until the start of the Malakand Social Forestry Project.

== Politics ==
In rural areas of Khyber Pakhtunkhwa, especially in the west and south, people often vote based on tribe, biradari, or family connections rather that political party policies. This is called vertical alignment. Horizontal alignment means people support a party because of its ideology. In Mansehra, tribal leaders won the National Assembly seats in the 1990, 1993, and 1997 elections. There was also competition between Gurjars and Sayeds. Because Gurjars had a larger population in Mansehra district, the Pakistan Muslim League – Nawaz gave the election ticket to a Gujjars leader, who then won the seat. Gurjars is an influential community in local politics of Khyber Pakhtunkhwa, especially, in the Abbottabad, Haripur, Battagram, Malakand, Dir, and Mansehra districts of Hazara and Malakand Divisions.

In 1971, the Gurjars realized that their population size had grown large enough to make them an important factor in election results. The first sign of this awareness appeared in the 1971 elections. In that year, Sardar Abdur Rahman Gujjar contested against a Sayyid candidate. By entering the race, he showed that for the first time the Gurjars were ready to assert themselves further directly and challenge the secure leadership in the area through elections. Sayed Qasim Ali Shah, a inferior landowner, joined the Gurjars to defeat feudalistic head, Muzammal Shah. Qasim Ali managed to win the National Assembly seat while the Gurjar leader, Qari Aziz Jalali secured the Provincial Assembly seat. They stayed allied through the 1980s, trading Gurjar votes for development work. In the ripe 1980s, Sardar Yusuf and Mian Wali Ur Rahman also entered mainstream politics.

In the 1970s Pakistan people party's social reform policies in mountain areas of Swat district brought a new group in Swati politics: the poor and landless. For the first time, they started taking an active role in local politics to protect their own interests. One key PPP measure was the push to redistribute land. A major change came with the Pakistan People's Party's policies on tenant rights and the end of compulsory labor. These reforms challenged the traditional authority of landlords over their tenants. The effects were most visible in the highland areas, where Gurjar tenants lived in scattered, isolated homes in the valleys. Inspired by the PPP tenancy policy, Gurjars organized against their landlords and claimed ownership of the land. This led to violent clashes. The Gurjars resisted and, in the fighting some Pashtuns were killed by Gurjars. In the 1970s under Zulfiqar Ali Bhuto's government, Kissan movement in Swat demanded tenants rights and ended up forced labour. In the mountain areas of Swat some Gurjars lived as tenants. During this movement there were clashes between Gurjars and Pashtuns that led to the deaths of some Pashtuns. The Kissan movement led to the Gujjar movement in Swat and Malakand districts. Gurjars from Barikot and Matta tehsils, supported by the Mazdur Kisan Party took over lands of Upper Swat.

In the 1990s, the relations between the Sayeds and Gurjars became tense. Anti-Sayed sentiment among the Gurjars was at an all-time high in the northern areas of Khyber Pakhtunkhwa which consequently resulted in instances of violence. This scenario saw the rise of 'Gujjarism' as a common slogan which was almost like an ideology; "Gujjarism" allowed Gurjar leaders to have political power in the area. In 1990, Sardar Yusuf ventured into politics by forming Kisan Mahaz Tanzeem or Farmers Front. He waged a battle for the liberation of Gurjars from the rule of Sayed and Swati landlords and at the same time fought cases for their rights in the courts against various feudal landlords including Sayed Muzammal Shah. Throughout the 1990s, the Gurjar candidates, including Yusuf won assembly seats with the assistance of Jamba party but could not become part of the federal and provincial cabinets thereby being prevented from providing services to the public.

Syed Abdul Khaliq Shah joined Sardar Yusuf in contesting the tehsil nazim elections in the union council. Negotiating the union council elections together was a strategy aimed at strengthening the candidates' positions in the tehsil and district. Sardar Muhammad Yusuf and Mian Wali-Ur-Rahman had previously won three elections during 1990s, but did not deliver services to the electorates as commanded by them in Mansehra district where Gurjars comprised the majority. Former senator Shah Mohamed was defeated in Lassan Nawab union council as voters had become averse to identity politics. It indicated that the election remained an identity-based voting culture in the villages where Gurjars, Swatis and Sayeds vote for their own elected representatives.

== Notables ==
=== Royalty ===
- Saidu Baba, Sufi saint and ruler of Swat princely state
- Miangul Aurangzeb last ruler of Swat princely state

=== Politics ===
- Fanoos Gujjar, founder of Awami Workers Party and politicians from Buner district.
- Sardar Muhammad Yousuf, minister for Religious Affairs and Interfaith Harmony and politicians from Mansehra district.

== See also ==
- Gurjars in Kashmir
- Gurjars in Punjab
- Gurjars in Maharashtra
- Gurjars in Himachal Pradesh
- Gurjars in Uttarakhand

== Bibliography ==
- Ṣābir, Sult̤ān Muḥammad (2006). Baloch aw Puṣhtūn: da tārīkh pahʼ hīndārah kṣhe (بلوڅ او پښتون د تاریخ په هنداره کې ) [Baloch and Pashtun in the mirror of history] (in Pashto). Hewād Pablīkeshanz.
- Shah, Mujahid; Bashir, Huma (2025). "A Comparative Ethnographic Study of Language Shift and Language Maintenance in the Home Domain: Highlighting the Role of Mothers". The International Journal of Communication and Linguistic Studies. 23 (4): 169–183. doi:10.18848/2327-7882/CGP/v23i04/169-183. ISSN 2327-7882.
- Stein, Sir Aurel (1929). On Alexander's Track to the Indus Personal Narrative of Explorations on the North-West Frontier of India. Macmillan. ASIN 9380852975.
- Horace Arthur Rose (1911) A Glossary of the Tribes and Castes of the Punjab and North-West Frontier Province. 1st ed. was printed by Government Printing Press Lahore.
