= Tajiks in Pakistan =

Tajik Pakistanis
Regions with significant populations
- Gilgit-Baltistan; Punjab; Khyber Pakhtunkhwa; Balochistan; Islamabad-Rawalpindi; Karachi

Languages
- Persian (Dari, Tajik, and Madaklashti); Urdu

Religion
- Sunni Islam

Related ethnic groups
- Other Tajiks, Farsiwan, Aimaqs, Hazaras, Dehwars

Tajiks in Pakistan are residents of Pakistan who are of Tajik ethnicity or citizenship. The Tajiks are a Persian-speaking Iranic ethnic group native to Central Asia, living primarily in Afghanistan, Tajikistan, and Uzbekistan. There are 1.88M Tajiks living in Pakistan.

There are also Afghan Tajik refugees in Pakistan. According to the Ministry of States and Frontier Regions in 2005, at least 7.3% of all Afghans living in Pakistan, or roughly 221,000 individuals, were categorised as ethnic Tajiks. There are also expatriates from Tajikistan.

== History ==
Pakistan and Tajikistan are separated by a narrow strip of Afghan territory known as the Wakhan Corridor. Historically, the Ghurid dynasty (a dynasty of presumed Tajik origin) controlled parts of Pakistan in the early 13th century.

== Demographics ==
=== Wakhi people ===
The Gojal, Ishkoman, and Yasin valleys of Gilgit-Baltistan, as well as the neighbouring Chitral district in northern Pakistan, are home to a significant native population of Pamiri Tajiks, known as the Wakhis. They speak the Wakhi language, which is an Eastern Iranian language distantly related to Persian. The Wakhi Tajik Cultural Association represents and promotes Wakhi culture in Pakistan.

=== Madaklashti people ===
The Madaklasht Valley in Chitral is home to a Tajik-Persian-speaking community that settled there centuries ago. The archaic dialect of Badakhshani Tajik spoken in the valley is known as Madaklashti. Its population is estimated to be around 4,000 as of 2024.

=== Tajik refugees from Afghanistan ===
There were 221,725 Tajik refugees from Afghanistan living in Pakistan in 2005, according to a census by the Ministry of States and Frontier Regions. They were part of the massive influx of Afghan immigrants to Pakistan that followed the outbreak of the Soviet–Afghan War in 1979, while others arrived during the Afghan civil wars beginning in 1992 and 1996, to escape the Taliban regime, or more recently, the post-2001 war in Afghanistan. Tajiks comprised 7.3% of the Afghan population in Pakistan, making them the second largest ethnicity after Pashtuns, who formed 81.5% of the immigrants. The census showed that they were divided into 42,480 families. In terms of sex ratio, 112,819 individuals (50.9%) were male, and 108,906 (49.1%) were female.

Obtaining updated figures remains elusive, as many Tajiks have returned to Afghanistan or migrated abroad in recent years, while some end up overstaying their visas or lack valid documentation of their stay and travel when questioned by law enforcement agencies.

In Balochistan, around 43,000 Afghan nationals living in the province as of 2005 were identified as Tajiks. Tajiks in Quetta worked mainly in clerical jobs and as teachers. They enjoyed a higher socioeconomic status compared to their Afghan counterparts of other ethnicities.

A small number of Tajiks also live in the Islamabad-Rawalpindi metropolitan region, and in Karachi, Sindh, where their population was up to 20,000 in 2004. Assimilating into Karachi's social and economic city life tends to be more challenging for Tajiks and other smaller communities than it is for Afghan Pashtuns, who are comparatively well integrated.

=== Refugees from Tajikistan ===
During the 1990s, as a result of the Tajikistani Civil War, between 700 and 1,200 Tajikistanis arrived in Pakistan, mainly as students or as the children of Tajikistani refugees in Afghanistan. In 2002, around 300 requested to return home and were repatriated to Tajikistan with the help of the IOM, UNHCR, and the authorities of both countries. As of 2009, there were around 140 Tajikistani students pursuing education at Pakistani universities.

== Organisations ==
Tajikistan has an embassy in Islamabad, and honorary consulates in Karachi, Lahore, and Peshawar. Airlines such as Tajik Air and Somon Air have expressed commercial interest in, and previously operated, flights linking Dushanbe to Pakistan in order to facilitate the movement of Tajiks between the two countries. National festivities such as Afghan Independence Day and Tajik Independence Day are observed by the Tajik diaspora.

== Notable people ==
- Abdul Sattar Afghani (1930–2006), two-time Mayor of Karachi and a member of the National Assembly of Pakistan; of Afghan Tajik heritage.
- Muhammad Siddiq (1933–2020), goalkeeper who played for the Pakistan national football team.

== See also ==
- Afghanistan–Pakistan relations
- Pakistan–Tajikistan relations
