= Eastern Persian =

Eastern Persian or Eastern Farsi may refer to:

- Aimaq dialect
- Bukharian (Judeo-Tajik dialect)
- Dari
- Dehwari language
- Hazaragi dialect
- Pahlavani language
- Tajik language

== See also ==
- Western Persian or Western Farsi
