= Tajiks in Afghanistan =

In Afghanistan, Tajiks are primarily Dari or Persian-speaking Sunni Muslims who usually refer to themselves by the region, province, city, town, or village from which they originate, such as Badakhshi, Baghlani, Mazari, Panjsheri, Kabuli, Herati, Kohistani, and others. Tajiks make up about 25–39% of Afghanistan's population. Nevertheless, no official data regarding ethnic populations exists in Afghanistan due to a lack of census.

Ethnic groups in Afghanistan as of 1997; Tajiks being shaded brown in northeast (predominantly in Badakhshan, Panjshir, and much of Baghlan, Parwan and Takhar), with scattered populations in southwest (notably in Herat; also known as Farsiwan)

== Society and culture ==
Unlike Pashtuns or Hazaras, Tajiks are not traditionally organized around tribal or kinship structures, and the term itself has historically functioned more as a residual label for Persian-speaking, sedentary Sunni Muslim populations without a common ancestry or tribal affiliation. From the mid-20th century onward, the political and academic discourse increasingly started to treat Tajiks as a distinct ethnic category.

The term Farsiwan (or Farsizabān) further complicates categorization: in western Afghanistan, particularly around Herat, it typically refers to Shia Persian speakers, distinguishing them from Sunni Dari speakers, while in broader usage it may encompass any non-Hazara Dari-speaking people, including Qizilbash and Aimaq communities. In the past some non-Pashto-speaking tribes were identified as Tajik—for example, the Furmuli.

== History ==
Historically, Tajiks formed majority of the Emirate of Badakhshan which was annexed in 1873.

== Geographic distribution and demographics ==
Tajiks (or Farsiwans, respectively) are predominant in four of the largest cities in Afghanistan—Kabul, Mazar-e Sharif, Herat, and Ghazni—and constitute a qualified majority in the northern and western provinces of Badakhshan, Panjshir, and Balkh, while making up significant portions of the population in Takhar, Kabul, Parwan, Kapisa, Baghlan, Badghis, and Herat. Despite not being Tajik, the westernmost Indo-Aryan Pashayi people of north-eastern Afghanistan have deliberately been listed as Tajik by census takers and government agents. This is probably because Pashayi-speaking Nizari Isma'ilis refer to themselves as Tajik.

Some sources like Encyclopædia Britannica previously stated that they constituted about 12–20% of the population before the War in Afghanistan from 2001 to 2021, which mostly excludes Persianised ethnic groups such as some Pashtuns, Uzbeks, Qizilbash, and Aimaqs, who, especially in large urban areas like Kabul and Herat, have assimilated into the respective local culture.

== See also ==
- Tajiks in China
- Tajiks in Uzbekistan
- Tajiks in Pakistan
