= Shishikoh valley =

Valley in Pakistan

The Shishikoh (Khowar, Urdu: ششیکوہ) also known as Shishikuh, is a valley located in Lower Chitral District of Malakand Division, Khyber Pakhtunkhwa. The valley has elevations ranging from approximately 1,420 m (4,660 ft) to 4,200 m (13,780 ft). It has a distance of 127.68 mi (205.48 km) from the Peshawar capital of Khyber Pakhtunkhwa.

The main ethnic group in the valley is the Gurjar. They came to this area in the beginning of the nineteenth century.

Languages spoken in the valley are Khowar, Gujari, and Pashto. In the areas of Madaklasht Gujari, Pashto, and Persian languages mainly spoken.
