= Pakistan–Tajikistan relations =

- Pakistan: Tajikistan

Diplomatic mission
- Pakistani Embassy, Dushanbe: Tajik Embassy, Islamabad

Envoy
- Ambassador Tariq Iqbal Soomro: Ambassador Sherali Jononov

Pakistan and Tajikistan are two countries that are only 16 kilometres (10 mi) apart at their closest point. The Wakhan Corridor is a narrow strip of territory in northeastern Afghanistan that extends to China and separates Tajikistan from Pakistan.

== History of relations ==
Relations between the two states were established when the republic of Tajikistan became independent following the collapse of the USSR. Trade and cooperation has steadily grown between the two nations, with several summits being held on how to improve bilateral trade. In March 2008 Said Saidbaig, the Tajik Ambassador, announced that his country would be able to export cheap electricity to Pakistan and Iran.

In 2019, Pakistan announced visa-on-arrival facilities for Tajik passport holders.

== Tajiks in Pakistan ==
There are at least 1.8 million Tajiks living in Pakistan. In recent years, many Tajiks from Tajikistan have settled in Pakistan due to the economic conditions prevalent in their home country, many have settled in the northern city of Ishkuman. In 1979, with the invasion by the Soviet Union of Afghanistan, a large number of Tajik refugees from that country came and settled throughout Pakistan. Exact numbers are difficult to ascertain as many don't have official identity cards or are counted as being Chitrali or Gilgiti in official census figures. There also large number of Tajiks from Afghanistan that have settled in Pakistan permanently. Many Tajik refugees from Tajikistan lived in Pakistan and some of them returned to Tajikistan.

== Strategic commitments ==
In November 2015, a meeting was held at Governor house Islamabad, the Tajik President and Pakistani Prime Minister affirmed plans to connect Pakistan and Tajikistan through road networks, such as from Chitral-Ishkashim-Dushanbe. In June 2021, President of Tajikistan visited Pakistan on the request of Pakistan's Prime Minister and both countries signed memorandums of understanding (MOU) for cooperation in various sectors, including the sale of Pakistan-manufactured arms to Tajikistan.

On September 17, 2021 Prime Minister of Pakistan, Imran Khan, announced that Pakistan will upgrade the bilateral relations to the level of a long-term strategic partnership.

In this regard, the two leaders further agreed to work towards signing of a Strategic Partnership Agreement. The leaders accorded particular focus on further strengthening of reliable and constructive high-level contacts, inter-parliamentary ties, defence and security relations between the two countries.

The two leaders underscored the importance of expansion of mutually beneficial economic and trade cooperation, improvement of investment and trade environment between the two countries.

== Cultural relations ==
Upper Chitral District, due to its proximity to Tajikistan, shares substantial cultural similarities

During the Soviet era, Tajik and Pakistani intellectuals collaborated on themes of anti-colonialism, drawing from their shared Persianate heritage.

== See also ==
- Foreign relations of Pakistan
- Tajiks in Pakistan
