= Madaklashti dialect =

Dialect of the Persian language spoken in Madaklasht, Pakistan

Madaklashti
- زبانِ مداکلاشتی
- Native to: Pakistan
- Region: Lower Chitral
- Ethnicity: Madaklashti Tajiks
- Native speakers: 3,964 (2013)
- Language family: Indo-European: Indo-Iranian; Iranian; Western; Southwestern; Persian; Eastern Persian; Madaklashti
- Writing system: Persian alphabet (Nastaliq)

Language codes
- ISO 639-3: –

Madaklashti is a dialect of Persian spoken in the Madaklasht Valley of the Chitral region in northern Pakistan. It is closely related to the Eastern Persian dialects spoken in the Badakhshan region of Afghanistan and Tajikistan.

The total population of Persian speakers is estimated to be about 4,000. They are believed to have migrated from Badakhshan to Chitral in the 18th century. Persian is completely isolated from other languages in the area and rarely draws any loanwords from Khowar, the dominant language of Chitral, although the community itself has undergone influences from the Kho culture.

== See also ==
- Dehwari, a Persian dialect spoken in Balochistan, southwestern Pakistan
- Hazaragi, a Persian dialect spoken by the Hazara diaspora in Pakistan
