= Dehwar =

Pakistani-Iranian ethnic group

The Dehwar are an ethnic group of the Balochistan region of Pakistan and Iran. They have traditionally been settled agriculturalists (in contrast to the nomadic Baloch). They speak Dehwari, a variety of Persian close to Dari and Tajik. They may be descendants of settled local populations predating the Baloch migration. In the Khanate of Kalat from the 17th century and later, the community was the source of recruits for the state's bureaucracy.

== Bibliography ==
- Spooner, Brian (2010). "Baluchistan i. Geography, History and Ethnography". Encyclopedia Iranica. Available online in two parts part 1 and part 2.
