= Dehwari language =

Persian language of Pakistan

Dehwari
- دهواری; Dehwārī
- Native to: Pakistan
- Region: Balochistan province: Kalat and Mastung
- Ethnicity: Dehwar, Brahui
- Native speakers: 19,000 (2018)
- Language family: Indo-European: Indo-Iranian; Iranian; Western Iranian; Southwestern Iranian; Persian; Eastern Persian; Dehwari
- Early forms: Old Persian: Middle Persian
- Writing system: Persian alphabet

Language codes
- ISO 639-3: deh
- Glottolog: dehw1238

Dehwari (دهواری, Dehwārī) is a Persian dialect spoken by some 19,000 Dehwar people in Balochistan, Pakistan as of 2018. Most Dehwari speakers are concentrated in Mastung, Khuzdar, Nushk, Kharan, Sarlath District, Dalbandin, and Kalat.

== Interaction with Brahui ==
Dehwari was introduced to the Brahui in the seventeenth century and the modern-day language uses many Dehwari loanwords in its vocabulary. In turn, Brahui has heavily influenced the language, which has made Dehwari a Persian dialect containing heavy Brahui (Dravidian) adstratum. This has made Dehwari speakers bilingual in both Dehwari and Brahui, and some in Balochi, Urdu, and even English.

== Decline ==
The drop of speakers in Dehwari was recorded in the 1921 Indian Census, with Pashto facing the same consequences in Kalat and Mastung. In the 1931 Indian Census, the Dehwari population outside of Kalat and Mastung was only 1,795.

== See also ==
- Madaklashti, a Persian dialect spoken in Chitral, northern Pakistan
- Hazaragi, a Persian dialect spoken by Hazara diaspora in Pakistan
