= Pahlavani language =

Extinct Persian language of Afghanistan

Pahlavani
- پهلڤانی
- Native to: Afghanistan
- Region: Chakhansur District
- Extinct: (date missing)
- Language family: Indo-European: Indo-Iranian; Iranian; Western; Southwestern; Persian; Eastern Persian; Pahlavani
- Writing system: unwritten, possibly Persian alphabet

Language codes
- ISO 639-3: phv
- Glottolog: pahl1240
- Linguasphere: 58-AAC-cf

Pahlavani is an extinct variety of Persian that was spoken in the Chakhansur District, in the Nimruz Province of Afghanistan. It was reportedly an unwritten language that is believed to be similar to Dari.
