= Jabir Raza =

Jabir Raza (born 1 August 1955) is an Indian historian, and a researcher in the history stream. Presently, he is retired, used to work as a professor at the department of history and prior to that was working as a lecturer at Department of History in Women's College of Aligarh Muslim University. He is from Nalanda, Bihar.

== Academic qualification ==
S. Jabir Raza has pursued Masters in Arts, and a M.Phil degree. He has also done Ph.D. with a specialization in Medieval India. He has also received the Charles Wallace fellowship from the School of Oriental and African Studies, University of London, in 1996.

== Books and research papers published ==
- The Jats of Punjab and Sind: Their Settlements and Migrations (c. 5th-12th AD)
- The Martial Jats: Their conflict with the Ghaznavid Sultans
- Ghaznavid Origins of the Administrative Institutions of the Delhi Sultanat
- Epigraphic Evidence for Officials and Administrative Offices in the Delhi Sultanate
- Nomenclature and Titulature of the Early Turkish Sultans of Delhi Found in Numismatic Legends
- Iqta' system in the pre-Ghurid kingdoms and its antecedents
- The Afghans and their relations with the Ghaznavids and the Ghurids
- Sultan Mahmud's Military Route to Kannauj
- S. Jabir Raza has published 20 papers.

== Notability ==
- One of the paper published by S. Jabir Raza was selected by the University Grants Commission (India) for its model curriculum: History and Archaeology, 2002.
- Two of the papers by him has been included in the syllabus of Jamia Hamdard University (New Delhi) and Centre Of Advanced Study in History, Aligarh Muslim University.
