= Mankial =

Valley in Khyber Pakhtunkhwa

Coordinates: 35°19′39″N 72°36′47″E

Mankial or Mankiyal is a valley and a town located in Swat District of Khyber Pakhtunkhwa, Pakistan. It has an area of 13063 hectacres and its elevation is 1430-5800 meters. It is located in Hindu Kush mountain range in northern Pakistan.

== See also ==
- Mankiala, a union council
