= Farsiwan =

Name of Persian speakers, esp. in Afghanistan

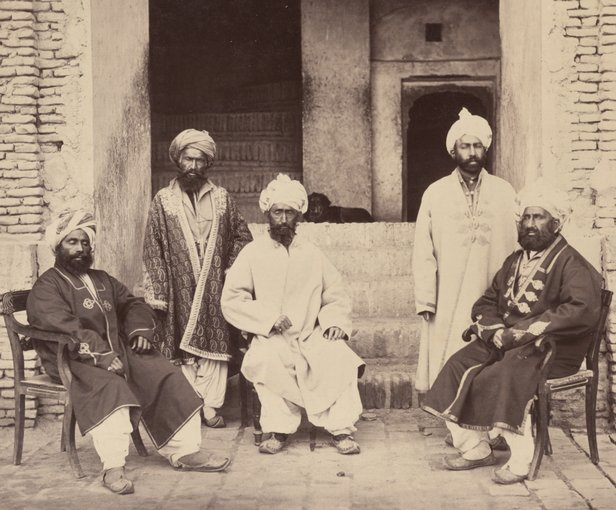
Group of Farsiwans, Kandahar, Afghanistan (1878-1880)

Fārsīwān (Persian: فارسیوان or its regional forms: Pārsīwān or Pārsībān meaning Persian speaker) is a contemporary designation for Persian-speaking communities in Afghanistan and its diaspora. Historically, the term was used to refer to settled farmers and urban dwellers who spoke Persian, and who are largely identified with the Tajik population.

The name combines the word "Fārsī" with the Persian suffix "wān". "Wān" is the local colloquial pronunciation of the more commonly known Persian suffix "bān". The exchange of the "b" sound for the softer "w" sound is common in the Persian spoken in Afghanistan, as in "āb", meaning water, being pronounced as "aw".

Although Farsiwans are sometimes erroneously referred to as Tajiks in literature, the term primarily denotes Persian-speaking, sedentary communities, historically distinguished by their adherence to Shia Islam and their roles as farmers and urban dwellers. The term Farsiwan has sometimes been applied by Pashtuns to refer both to Tajiks and to the other settled Persian-speaking groups.

== Historical Usage ==
Historical sources from the nineteenth century often used the terms Farsiwan and Tajik interchangeably to refer to Persian-speaking sedentary populations of Afghanistan and neighbouring regions. The British diplomat Mountstuart Elphinstone wrote in Account of the Kingdom of Cabul that these two terms are used interchangeably in Afghanistan

The names of Taujik and Parseewaun are used indiscriminately both in Afghanistan and Turkestan.

— Mountstuart Elphinstone, Account of the Kingdom of Cabul (1815)

Afghan historical literature also associates the term with Persian-speaking Tajik populations. The historian Muhammad Hayat Khan wrote in Hayat-i Afghani that the real Farsiwan of Afghanistan were Tajiks. Modern historian Mohiyuddin Mehdi likewise notes that the term historically referred to Persian-speaking settled populations commonly identified with Tajiks in earlier sources.

Historical studies of Mughal-period Kabul describe the Persian-speaking population of the region as “Tajik or Parsiwan.” According to the historical study Suba of Kabul Under the Mughals, a large portion of the inhabitants of Kabul consisted of Tajiks, also referred to as Parsiwan because of their use of the Persian language.

A much larger ethnic group, widespread in Kabul was Tajik or Parsiwan. They spoke Afghan Persian or Dari, quite similar to the Persian spoken in eastern Afghanistan.

— Suba of Kabul Under the Mughals

Historical sources also emphasize the long-standing presence of Persian-speaking populations in the region. As described in Seistan, these communities were identified as part of the Tajik or Farsiwan (Persian-speaking) races.

Both these persons belong to the Tajik or Farsi-wan (Farsi-khwan or Persian-speaking) races, which represent at the present day the ancient Iranian race that formed the bulk of the population down to the first quarter of the 13th century of our era when the irruption of the hordes of Chingiz Khan shattered and overthrew the civilization which Islam had crystallized into a form that had endured for over six centuries of time.

— Seistan

Taken together, these historical sources show that the term Farsiwan has long been used to denote Persian-speaking sedentary populations in Afghanistan, often interchangeably with Tajik. While originally a linguistic designation, the term was also applied ethnically to settled communities across Kabul, Herat, Sistan, and neighbouring regions. This historical usage underscores that Farsiwan is not a separate group from the Tajiks, but rather a term reflecting language, settlement, and continuity of Iranian cultural heritage in the region.

== Characteristics ==
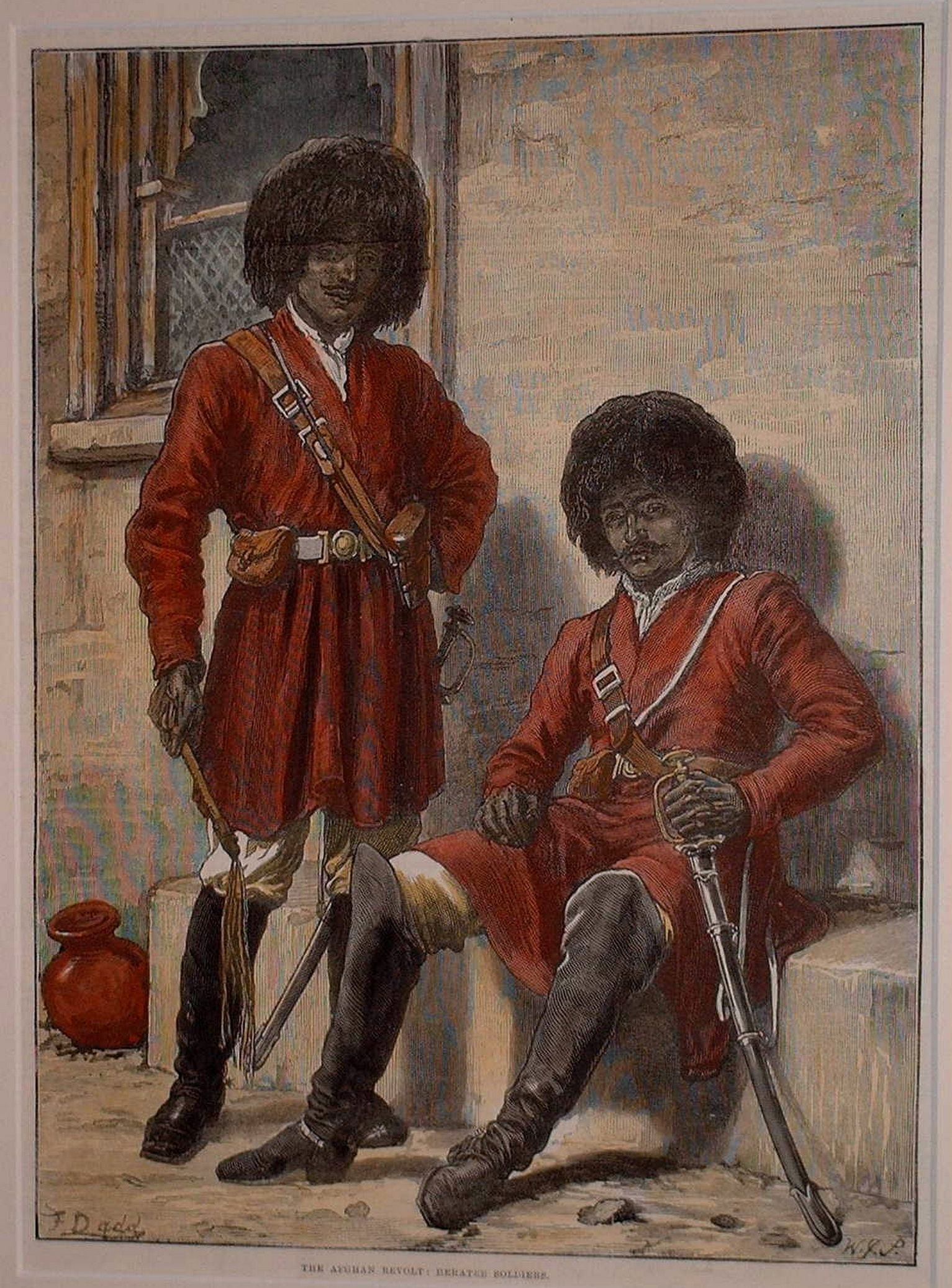
Two soldiers from the Afghan Revolt, 1879: a Herati (Tajik) soldier from Herat and a Ghilji soldier from Qalati Ghilji. Drawn by Frank Dadd

Like the Persians of Iran, the Farsiwan are often distinguished from other Tajiks by their adherence to Shia Islam as opposed to the Sunni Islam favored by the majority of Tajiks. However, there are also minor linguistic differences especially among the rural Farsiwan. The Farsiwan sometimes speak a dialect more akin to the Darī dialects of the Persian language, for example the dialect of Kabul, as opposed to the standard Tahrānī dialect of Iran. However, most of the Fārsīwān speak the Khorasani dialect, native to the Afghanistan–Iran border region, namely Harāt and Farāh, as well as the Iranian provinces of Khorasan. Unlike the Hazara, who are also Persian-speaking and Shia, the Farsiwan do not show any, or very limited, traces of Turkic and Mongol ancestry. Although the Qizilbash of Iran and Afghanistan are also Persian-speaking Shias, they are usually regarded as a separate group from the Farsiwan.

An alternative name used locally for Farsiwan, and for Tajiks in general, is Dahqān (or Dihqān), which means "a person who cultivates the land" or "farmer" was historically used in Afghanistan to refer to settled Persian-speaking Tajiks in contrast to nomadic populations in the region.

== Geographic distribution ==
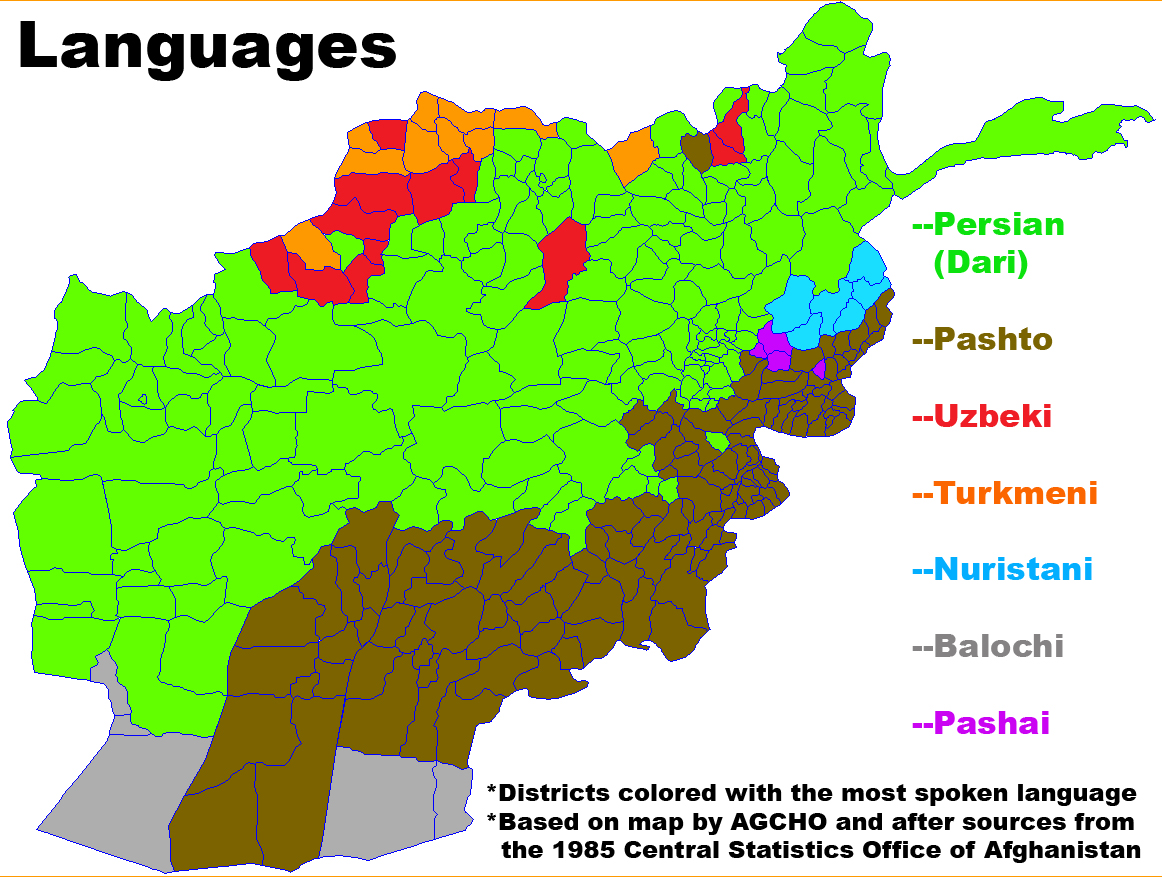
Map of Languages (in Districts) in Afghanistan

Farsiwan are Persian-speaking sedentary communities in Afghanistan, historically associated with the Tajik population. As of 1997, the largest concentrations were in the western and northwestern provinces, including Herat, Farah, Ghor, and Mazar-i-Sharif. They form the majority of the population in the city of Herāt.

Smaller Farsiwan communities exist in Kabul, Kandahar, and Ghazni.

Historically, Farsiwan settlements correspond to areas of agricultural development and urban centers, reflecting their traditional roles as Dehgān (land-cultivating) communities, craftsmen, and traders. Although often distinguished from Sunni Tajiks due to their adherence to Shia Islam, they are not a separate ethnic group but rather a socially and linguistically defined subgroup of Persian-speaking Tajiks.

Some sources note smaller diaspora communities in Iran, particularly in Mashhad and Tehran, resulting from migration during the late 20th century.

== See also ==
- Tajiks
- Persians
- Persian language
- Dari
- Demography of Afghanistan
