= Kot Najeebullah =

Coordinates: 33°56′N 72°51′E

Kot Najibullah کوٹ نجیب اُللہ
- City
- Interactive map of Kot Najibullah
- Country: Pakistan
- Province: Khyber Pakhtunkhwa
- District: Haripur
- Elevation: 520 m (1,710 ft)

Population (2017)
  - Urban: 50,000
- Time zone: UTC+5 (PKT)
- Postal code: 22660
- Dialling code: 0995

Kot Najeebullah (Hindko: کوٹ نجیب اُللہ (Shahmukhi)), also Spelled Kot Najibullah, is one of the 44 union councils, administrative subdivisions, of Haripur District.

Kot Najibullah In Khyber Pakhtunkhwa Is Located In Pakistan About 18 mi (or 29 km) North-West Of Islamabad, The Country's Capital Town.

There are several Unesco World Heritage Sites nearby. The closest heritage site is Taxila at a distance of 11 mi (or 18 km), South.

== See also ==
- Haripur
- Abbottabad
- Manshera
- Balakot
- Hattar
