= Hilkot =

Coordinates: 34°37′N 73°10′E

- Village and union council
- Interactive map of Hilkot
- Country: Pakistan
- Region: Khyber Pakhtunkhwa
- District: Mansehra District

Government
  - Type: Democracy
- Time zone: UTC+5 (PST)

Hilkot is a village and union council (an administrative subdivision) of Mansehra District in the Khyber Pakhtunkhwa province of Pakistan. It is located to the north of Mansehra, the district capital, and southeast of Batagram city and lies in an area affected by the 2005 Kashmir earthquake. There are four village councils (VCs): VC 1. Hilkot, VC 2. Kund Bala, VC 3. Sathan Gali, and VC 4. Balimang. The languages spoken here are Pashto, Gojri and Hindko. Major castes are Swati & Gujjar. The Kund Bala and Sathan Gali VCs are a totally hilly area inhabited mostly by the Gujjar clan, while the Hilkot & Balimang VCs are most populated by Swati & Syed families. There are green fields and most of land is hilly and occupied by forests. The main crops are maize, wheat and some rice. There are orchards of apple, apricot, pear, plums and date-plum. Natural water rich in herbs comes from hills. The literacy rate is growing gradually. The local population faces difficulties due to lack of hospitals in the area as well as absence of any public college for boys or girls. Mostly people moved for jobs & businesses and support their families & serving in different departments of country (in government private & public sectors) & abroad. Farming is only way of earning but due to hilly area and weather conditions its not fulfill requirements of area.
