= Madaklasht =

Madaklasht Madaklashti: مدکلاشت Urdu: مدک لشٹ Khowar: مدگلاشٹ
- valley
- Location within Khyber Pakhtunkhwa
- Coordinates: 35.7737°N 72.0312°E
- Country: Pakistan
- Province: Khyber Pakhtunkhwa
- District: Lower Chitral
- Elevation: 2,581 m (8,468 ft)

Population
  - Total: 3,964

Languages
  - Official: Urdu
- Time zone: UTC+05:00 (PKT)

Madaklasht (Urdu: مدک لشٹ) is a valley located in Lower Chitral District, Khyber Pakhtunkhwa, Pakistan.

== Geography ==
Madaklasht is located in the extreme north of Shishikoh Valley, which is part of the Lower Chitral District. It is 40 km from Chitral city. The average elevation is around 8,500 feet above the sea level.

The geographical features of the valley include the Andiveer Glacier, Kurdoodh waterfall, water springs of Darbar Shahi, and trekking routes to Golen in northwest. It is an off-grid valley where the only source of electricity is the local micro hydro power plant constructed by AKRSP-PEDO. Road from Drosh to Madaklasht is around 40 km and is non-metallic. There is a government dispensary and a Aga Khan Health Center.

== History ==
The people of Madaklasht came to Chitral during the late 16th century. It is said some seven people from Badakhshan region in Afghanistan and Tajikistan came to Chitral to produce firearms for the Mehtar of Chitral. The people were known by Khowar speakers as Badakhshani and Tajiki and were ironmongers.

=== Religion ===
The majority of the population in Madaklasht follows the Ismaili sect of Islam.

=== Language ===
A Persian dialect is the mother tongue in Madaklasht.
