= Topa, Jammu and Kashmir =

Topa
- Village
- Location in Jammu and Kashmir, India Topa (India)
- Coordinates: 33.60°N 74.11°E
- Country: India
- Union Territory: Jammu and Kashmir
- District: Poonch
- Tehsil: Mendhar
- Elevation: 1,126 m (3,694 ft)

Languages
  - Spoken: Pahari, Gojri
- Time zone: UTC+5:30 (IST)
- PIN: 185211
- Vehicle registration: JK-12
- Website: poonch.nic.in

Topa is a village in Mendhar Tehsil, Poonch district in the Indian union territory of Jammu and Kashmir. During the Indo-Pakistani War of 1965, the Battle of Topa was fought here by 5 Gorkha Rifles.

== History ==
=== Battle of Topa (1965) ===
From anti-infiltration operations conducted by the battalion from 5 August 1965 onwards in Rajouri and Mendhar Sectors of Jammu and Kashmir, it was evident that many strong infiltrating columns of the Pakistani Army had been sent into our territory as part of Pakistan's ‘Operation Gibraltar’. By the third week of August 65, Headquarter 52 Mountain Brigade (Brigadier later Lieutenant General R D Hira, MVC) had been inducted into the sector for clearance of infiltrators from Mendhar, Surankot and Krishna Ghati area. For the operations, 4/5 GR (FF), 14 Kumaon and 3/11 GR were put under command of the brigade and made responsible for anti-infiltration operations in Mendhar in the South and Krishna Gati (KG) area of 93 Infantry Brigade Sector. Reports of major infiltration in Mendhar and Balnoi had been received and some of the roads had been blocked by Paki troops. Closer to Mendhar, Paki's had occupied Topa feature, which effectively dominated fair weather road Mendhar - Balnoi, thus cutting off Balnoi and Krishna Ghati (93 Infantry Brigade). They had also established defences at a place called OP Hill, on the ridgeline across Mendhar River. The first priority of the brigade was to cut off maintenance routes of these Paki troops and clearance of road to Balnoi and KG. Alfa Company of 21 AK Battalion Pakistan Army, with additional troops and Razakars, were reported to be occupying Topa Height (Pt 4571) and had effectively interdicted road communications in the area.

Topa feature, Pt 4571, a dominating hill, was about 1.5 kilometres away from the Mendhar – Balnoi Road. The position had three hubs; Point 4571 (Topa Top); Gujar Kotha, a feature on its southern slopes; and a Ring Contour further to the south, called Jungle Tekri overlooking the road. It was, therefore, decided to launch a deliberate attack to capture these positions and open the road. The task of capturing Topa was given to 4/5 GR (FF). The battalion concentrated on 25 August 1965 at Mendhar for the task.

On 26 August, after having concentrated in the area, own troops were fired upon from Jungle Tekri and Gujar Kotha. In the initial operations, launched the same day, the area of Jungle Tekri was captured by B Coy led by Major (later Colonel) Sunit Singh, and 2 POWs, apart from the recovery of weapons and ammunition. This position, apparently, was a forward element of Topa defences. It was decided to launch a deliberate attack the next day, 27 August, to capture the feature. The task of the capture of Topa Top was given to Delta Company (Captain (later Colonel) Bikram Katoch) with Bravo Company (Sunit Singh) and Charlie Company (Major later Major General Ashok Mehta, AVSM, FRGS) as a firm base and reserve company respectively. The orders to Bikram Katoch by Commanding Officer (CO) late Lieutenant Colonel (Later Colonel) M L Bhatia were; "'Topa lai capture Gariyo Bhane Kasto Hola'" followed by brief orders (Translated from Gorkhali: ‘How about capturing Topa?’). Colonel Bhatia did not restrict himself with brief orders for the attack but was all along with the leading Company, just behind the leading Platoon.

On 27th, Captain Bikram Katoch led the assault of his company. CO, Lieutenant Colonel (Later Colonel) M L Bhatia, followed the leading platoon of D Company. As soon as the troops reached closer to the Gujar Kotha, they were fired upon. They unsheathed their Khukri's and amidst the war cry of Ayo Gorkhali assaulted the position. By about by 27th-afternoon area Gujar Kotha, position below Pt 4571 (Topa Top) was captured. The defences had mostly been captured but Pt 4571 (Topa Top) was still held. D Company pressed on and by evening Topa Top was also captured. Battalion thereafter firmed in, reorganised on the objective and road communication was opened. Two more POWs, many dead bodies of Paki soldiers and a lot of arms and ammunition were found. On 28 August 1965, during further combing operations towards the north of the ridge, Senior Junior Commissioned Officer (JCO - Subedar) of the Pak Company (JC 824 Subedar Abdul Rahman of A Coy 21 AK Battalion) was captured from a Gujjar Hut, with an injury to his right arm. He revealed that the injury was by a direct hit of a 2-inch mortar bomb, fired by mortar detachment of D Company under Naik Bir Bahadur Pun. However, Naik Bir Bahadur Pun had gallantly laid down his life, when he was hit by a bullet in the head. C Company was thereafter tasked to hold the area as the battalion less C Company moved out of the area, for further operations in the sector, which continued till the ceasefire on 22 September 1965.

== Geography ==
Topa is located at 33.65°N 74.11°E. It has an average elevation of 1,126 metres (3,694 feet). The village is located 55 kilometres from district headquarters Poonch and 1 km from tehsil headquarters Mendhar.

== Demographics ==
According to the 2011 census of India, Topa had 313 households. The literacy rate of Topa village is 63.59%. In Topa, Male literacy stands at 77.45% while the female literacy rate was 51.29%.

Demographics (2011 Census)
	Total	Male	Female
Population	1742	851	891
Children aged below 6 years	355	199	156
Scheduled caste	0	0	0
Scheduled tribe	1019	507	512
Literacy	63.59%	77.45%	51.29%
Workers (all)	186	172	14
Main workers (all)	85	–	–
Marginal workers (total)	101	98	3

== Transportation ==
=== Air ===
Poonch Airport is a non-operational airstrip in the tehsil headquarters Poonch. The nearest airport to Poonch is Sheikh ul-Alam International Airport in Srinagar, located 175 kilometres from Topa.

=== Rail ===
There is no railway connectivity to Topa. There are plans to construct a Jammu–Poonch line which will connect Jammu with district headquarters Poonch via railways. The nearest major railway station is Jammu Tawi railway station located 210 kilometres from Topa.

=== Road ===
The village is well-connected to other places in Jammu and Kashmir and India by the NH 144A and other intra-district roads.

== See also ==
- Poonch
- Jammu and Kashmir
- Rajouri
- Surankote
- Jammu
