= Bhata Dhurian =

- Village
- Location in Jammu and Kashmir Bhata Dhurian (India)
- Coordinates: 33.68715°N 74.374°E
- Country: India
- Union Territory: Jammu and Kashmir
- District: Poonch
- Tehsil: Balakote

Languages
  - Official: Urdu
  - Spoken: Pahari, Gojri
- PIN: 185121
- Vehicle registration: JK-12
- Website: poonch.nic.in

Bhata Dhurian is a village in Poonch district, Jammu and Kashmir, India.

== Geography ==
Bhata Dhurian is a village in lying near the LOC of Poonch district and Rajouri district. It is 30 kilometres (19 mi) south of its district headquarters at Poonch, 15 kilometres (9.3 mi) from Balakote, 129 kilometres (80 mi) from the state's summer capital at Srinagar and 200 kilometres (120 mi) from its winter capital at Jammu. NH 144A passes from this village to Poonch.

Draba (18 km), Nar (3 km), Potha Upper (11 km), Surankote (13 km) are the nearby villages to Bhata Dhurian. Bhata Dhurian is surrounded by Bufliaz block to the north, Manjakote block to the south, Thanamandi block on the east, and Mendhar block to the west. Rajouri and Poonch are the nearest cities to Bhata Dhurian.

== Climate ==
It is moderate in summer. Snow falls at the end of January in its peaks. Bhata Dhurian has summer highest day temperature is between 19 °C to 32 °C. The average temperature of January is −8 °C, February is 11 °C, March is 1 °C, April is 21 °C, May is 30 °C.

== Demographics ==
According to the 2001 Census of India, the population of the village was 2897, of which females constituted 1425. The literacy rate was 56.3%, with that for females being 20.3%. Children aged 0–6 accounted for 47.2% of the population.

== Parnai Power project ==
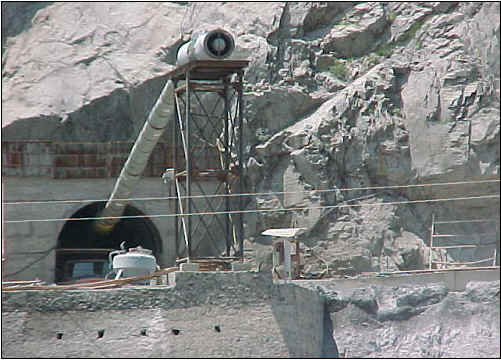
Parnai Project

The Parnai power project which is under development adjoins the Bhata Dhurian tunnel and will produce 37.5 MV electricity.

== Transportation ==
=== Air ===
Poonch Airport is a non-operational airstrip in the district headquarters Poonch. The nearest airport is Sheikh ul-Alam International Airport in Srinagar, located 195 kilometres from Bhata Dhurian.

=== Rail ===
There is no railway connectivity to Bhata Dhurian. There are plans to construct a Jammu–Poonch line which will connect Jammu with Poonch via railways. The nearest major railway station is Jammu Tawi railway station located 190 kilometres from Bhata Dhurian.

=== Road ===
The village is well-connected to other places in Jammu and Kashmir and India by the NH 144A, the Mughal Road and other intra-district roads.

== See also ==
- Poonch
- Jammu and Kashmir
- Rajouri
- Surankote
- Jammu
