= Bhimber Gali =

- Village
- Interactive map of Bhimber Gali
- Location in Jammu and Kashmir, India Bhimber Gali (India)
- Coordinates: 33°33′03″N 74°13′08″E
- Country: India
- Union Territory: Jammu and Kashmir
- District: Poonch
- Tehsil: Mendhar

Languages
  - Spoken: Pahari, Gojri
- Time zone: UTC+5:30 (IST)
- PIN: 185211
- Vehicle registration: JK-12
- Website: poonch.nic.in

Bhimber Gali is a village in the Poonch district of Jammu and Kashmir, India. It is often called BG locally as an abbreviated form of Bhimber Gali. It is named after a mountain pass "Bhimber Gali" on the mountain ridge separating the Poonch River and the Rajouri Tawi basins. Bhimber Gali is the point at which four roads meet, one from Hamirpur Balakote, second from Rajouri via Manjakote, third from Mendhar Tehsil and fourth from Poonch Via Surankote. This area borders Pakistan administered Kashmir and thus the surrounding areas often remain in news for cross LoC ceasefire violations.

== Transportation ==
=== Air ===
Poonch Airport is a non-operational airstrip in the district headquarters Poonch. The nearest airport is Sheikh ul-Alam International Airport in Srinagar, located 170 kilometres from Bhimber Gali.

=== Rail ===
There is no railway connectivity to Bhimber Gali. There are plans to construct a Jammu–Poonch line which will connect Jammu with Poonch with railways. The nearest major railway station is Jammu Tawi railway station located 185 kilometres from Bhimber Gali.

=== Road ===
The village is well-connected to other places in Jammu and Kashmir and India by the NH 144A and other intra-district roads.

== See also ==
- Haji Pir Pass
- Leepa Valley
- Jammu
