= Ari (Jammu and Kashmir) =

- Village
- Location in Jammu and Kashmir Ari (India)
- Coordinates: 33.57°N 74.18°E
- Country: India
- Union Territory: Jammu and Kashmir
- District: Poonch
- Tehsil: Mendhar

Population (2011)
  - Total: 7,772

Languages
  - Spoken: English, Pahari, Urdu
- Time zone: UTC+5:30 (IST)
- PIN: 185211
- Vehicle registration: JK-12
- Website: poonch.nic.in

Ari is a village situated in Poonch district of Jammu and Kashmir, India. It is one of the largest villages in Jammu and Kashmir. It is located approximately 5 kilometers away from Mendhar Tehsil and 44 kilometers away from Poonch district

== Demographics ==
According to the 2011 Indian Census, the village consists of a total population of 7,772 people. The literacy rate of the Ari village is 74.48 per cent which is higher than the literacy rate of 67.16 per cent of Jammu and Kashmir.

== Transportation ==
=== Air ===
Poonch Airport is a non-operational airstrip in the district headquarters Poonch. The nearest airport is Sheikh ul-Alam International Airport in Srinagar, located 180 kilometres from Ari.

=== Rail ===
There is no railway connectivity to Ari. There are plans to construct a Jammu–Poonch line which will connect Jammu with Poonch with railways. The nearest major railway station is Jammu Tawi railway station located 195 kilometres from Ari.

=== Road ===
The village is well-connected to other places in Jammu and Kashmir and India by the NH 144A and other intra-district roads.

== See also ==
- Poonch
- Jammu and Kashmir
- Rajouri
- Surankote
- Jammu
