= Dhargaloon =

Dhargaloon Dhargloon
- Village
- Nickname: Mini Kashmir
- Location in Jammu and Kashmir, India Dhargaloon (India)
- Coordinates: 33.52°N 74.20°E
- Country: India
- Union Territory: Jammu and Kashmir
- District: Poonch
- Tehsil: Balakote

Government
  - Type: Panchayat
  - Body: Local Rural
- Elevation: 1,500 m (4,900 ft)

Population (2011)
  - Total: 1,035

Languages
  - Spoken: Paharhi, Gojri language, Urdu
- Time zone: UTC+5:30 (IST)
- PIN: 185111
- Vehicle registration: JK-12
- Website: poonch.nic.in

Dhargloon (also spelled as Dargaloon or Dhargalon) is a village, located in Mendhar Tehsil of Poonch district in Indian administered union territory of Jammu and Kashmir. Its district headquarters are located in Poonch and administrative units in "Mendhar"(temporarily). This village comes under the "Balakote" block which is its local administrative unit. The village is located close the border with Pakistan and is largely influenced by the border forces. Residents of Dhargaloon staged a protest in May 2017 because of water and power shortages.

== Demographics ==
According to the 2011 census of India, Dhargaloon has 1,062 households. The literacy rate of Dhargaloon was 70.20% compared to 67.16% of Jammu and Kashmir. In Dhargaloon, Male literacy stands at 81.12% while the female literacy rate was 60.07%.

Demographics (2011 Census)
	Total	Male	Female
Population	6005	2952	3053
Children aged below 6 years	988	537	451
Scheduled caste	0	0	0
Scheduled tribe	1418	701	717
Literacy	70.20%	81.12%	60.07%
Workers (all)	2669	1307	1362
Main workers (all)	739	–	–
Marginal workers (total)	1930	823	1107

== Transportation ==
=== Air ===
Poonch Airport is a non-operational airstrip in the district headquarters Poonch. The nearest airport is Sheikh ul-Alam International Airport in Srinagar, located 175 kilometres from Dhargaloon.

=== Rail ===
There is no railway connectivity to Dhargaloon. There are plans to construct a Jammu–Poonch line which will connect Jammu with Poonch with railways. The nearest major railway station is Jammu Tawi railway station located 191 kilometres from Dhargaloon.

=== Road ===
The village is well-connected to other places in Jammu and Kashmir and India by the NH 144A and other intra-district roads.

== See also ==
- Poonch
- Jammu and Kashmir
- Rajouri
- Surankote
- Jammu
