= Seri Khawaja =

Seri Khawaja Serikhawaja
- Village
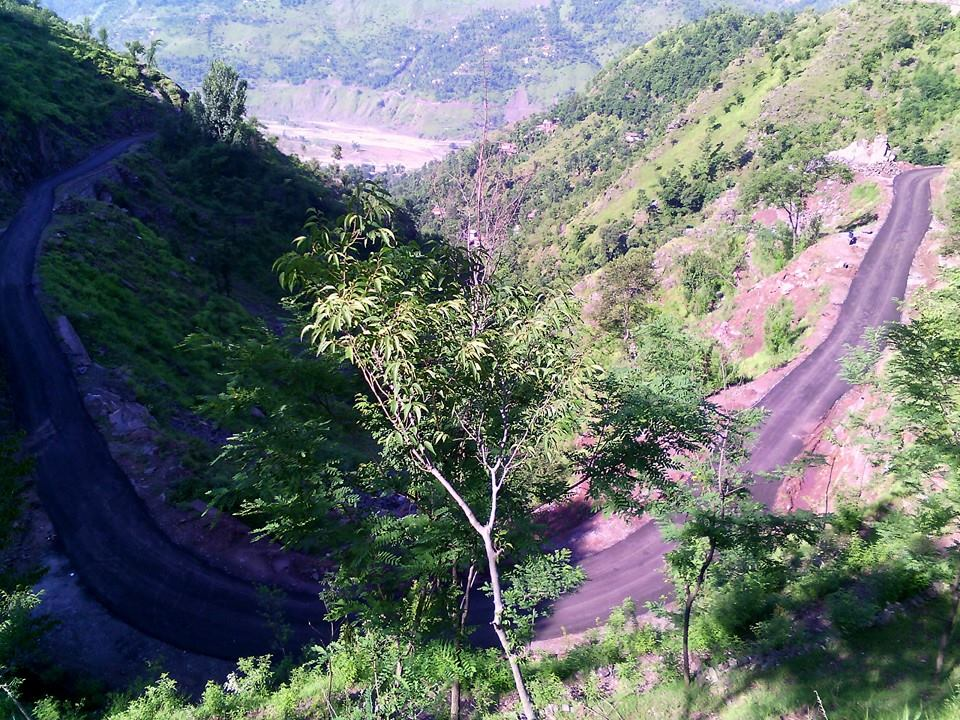

- Location in Jammu and Kashmir, India Seri Khawaja (India)
- Coordinates: 33.69°N 74.22°E
- Country: India
- Union Territory: Jammu and Kashmir
- District: Poonch
- Tehsil: Haveli

Population (2011)
  - Total: 3,557

Languages
  - Spoken: English, Hindi, Urdu
- Time zone: UTC+5:30 (IST)
- PIN: 185121
- Vehicle registration: JK

Seri Khawaja is a village in the Surankote Tehsil of Poonch district in the Indian union territory of Jammu and Kashmir. It is located 17 kilometres (11 mi) east of the city of Poonch on the Jammu-Poonch highway.

Although located among mountainous terrain, Seri Khawaja enjoys a moderate climate with light snow in winter and cool summer weather moderated by the stream that flows through the village. The economy is agrarian, with residents producing two or three different crops each year.

The population of Seri Khawaja has declined in recent years, with many leaving the small village for opportunities in nearby larger cities.

Literacy of the village was quite low in the past but now has recently increased. Educational infrastructure includes a higher secondary school, five middle schools, four primary schools and five AWCs. Other facilities within the village include health centres and an animal husbandry education centre.

Seri Khawaja has gained prominence as a new link of the Mughal Road between Mandi and Bufliaz is being constructed through this village.
