= Mandi Tehsil =

Tehsil in Jammu and Kashmir, India world

Mandi
- Tehsil
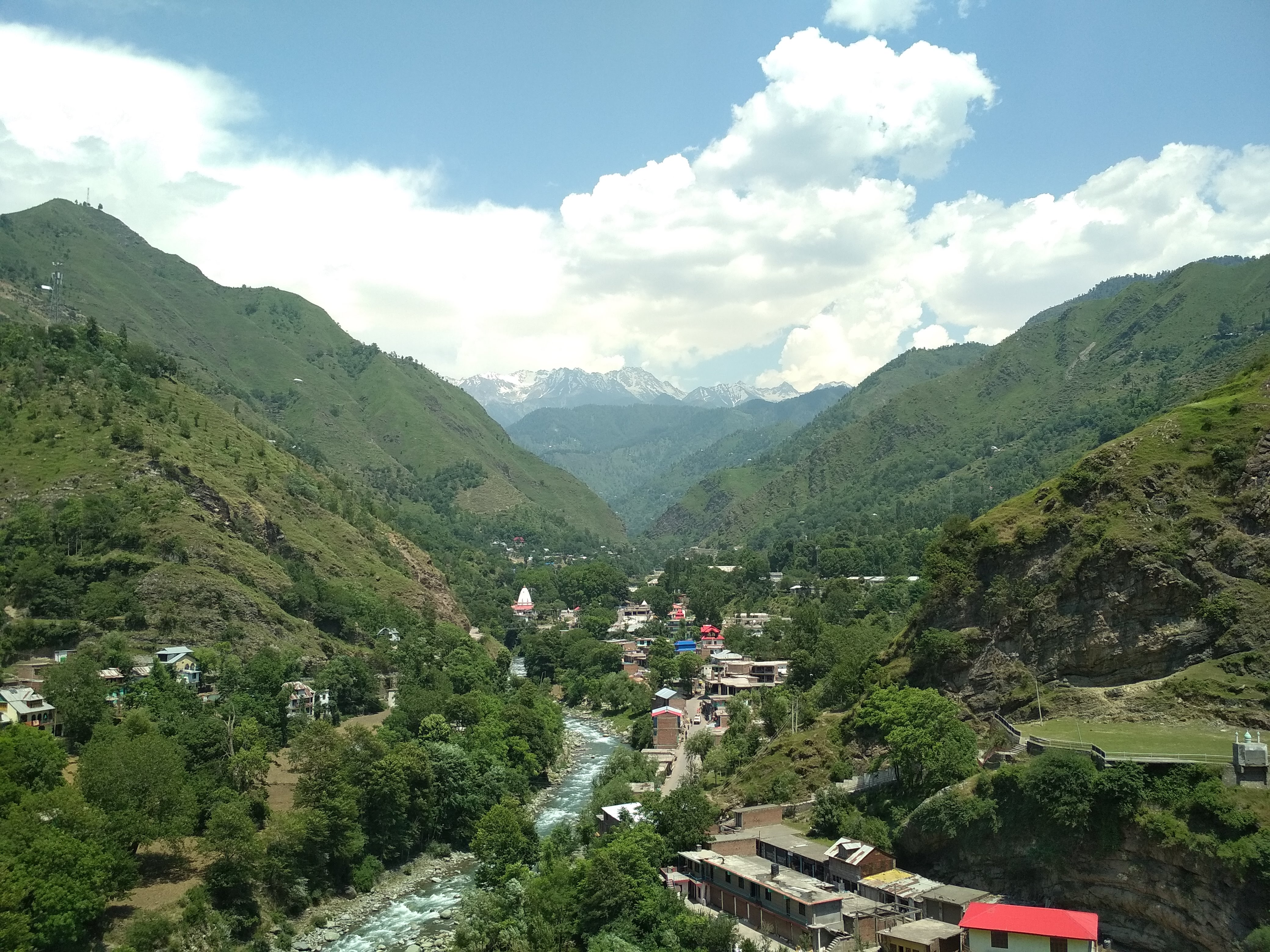
- A view of Mandi from the Western Hills

- Location in Jammu and Kashmir, India Mandi (India)
- Coordinates: 33°47′46″N 74°15′14″E
- Country: India
- Union Territory: Jammu and Kashmir
- District: Poonch
- Headquarters: Mandi

Government
  - Type: Tehsil
  - Body: Tehsildar

Population (2011)
  - Total: 77,947

Languages
  - Official: Gojari, English, Hindi, Kashmiri, Urdu
  - Spoken: Gojari, Kashmiri, Pahari
- Time zone: UTC+5:30 (IST)
- PIN: 185102
- Telephone code: 01965
- Vehicle registration: JK-12
- Literacy: 58.28%
- Website: www.poonch.nic.in

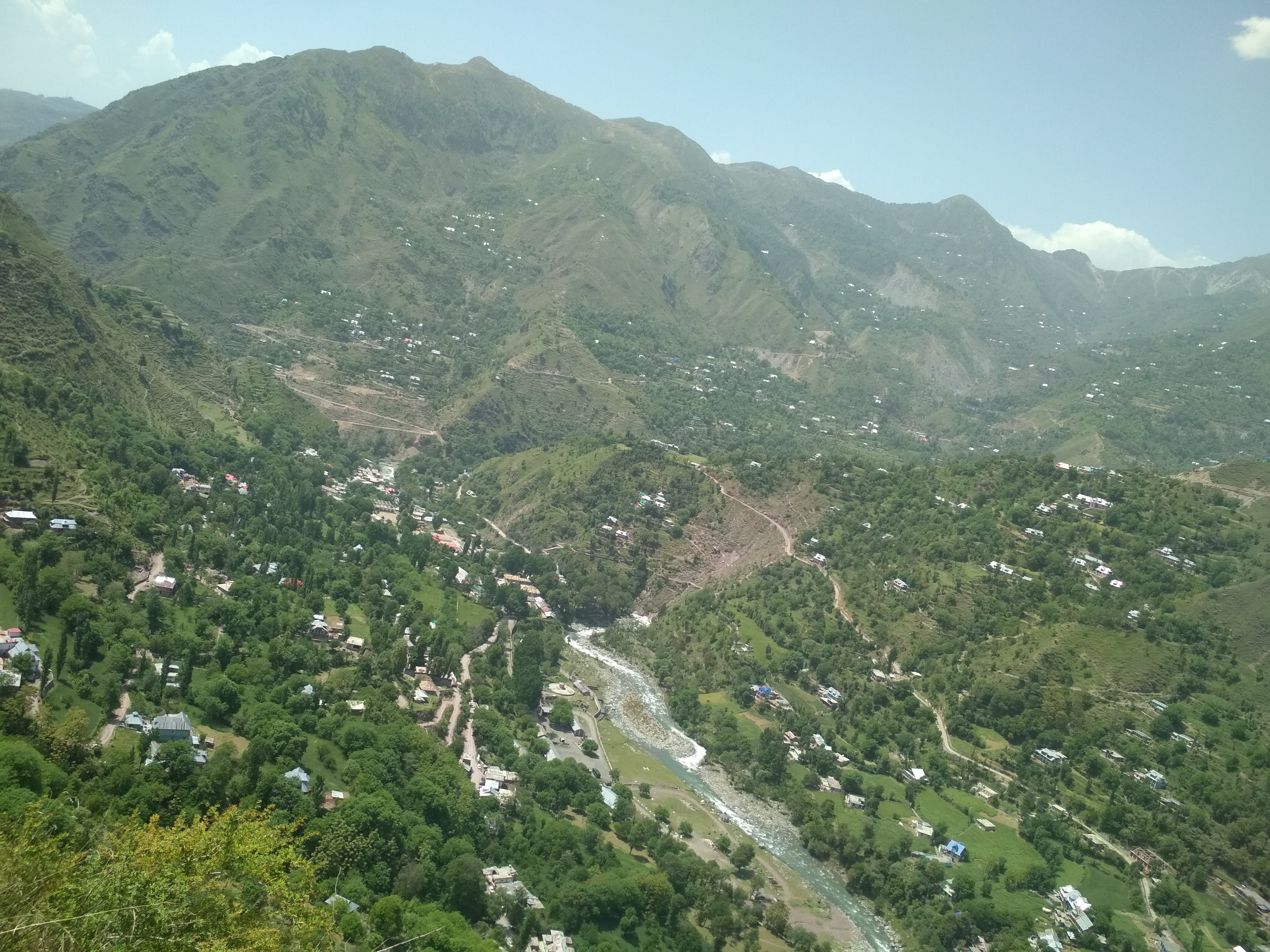
A view from Eastern Hills

Mandi is a town and a tehsil in the Poonch district of the Indian union territory of Jammu and Kashmir in the disputed Kashmir region. Mandi is located in east of the Poonch district, about 171 kilometres (106 mi) from Srinagar and 1 kilometre (0.62 mi) south of the Line of Control with Pakistan. The Ancient Hindu temple Baba Budha Amernath is located here.

== Demographics ==
Religion in Mandi Tehsil (2011)
1. Islam (96.1%)
2. Hinduism (2.94%)
3. Sikhism (0.43%)
4. Christianity (0.15%)
5. Buddhism (0.01%)
6. Not Stated (0.34%)

The total projected population of Mandi Tehsil is 77,947, with 41,365 males and 36,582 females according to the 2011 census of India. The population includes Gujjars, Bakerwals, Pahari-Pothwari Speakers, which is intermediate between Lahnda and Punjabi. and Kashmiris.

== Transportation ==
=== Air ===
Poonch Airport is a non-operational airstrip in the district headquarters Poonch. The nearest airport to Mandi is Sheikh ul-Alam International Airport in Srinagar, located 180 kilometres from Mandi.

=== Rail ===
There is no railway connectivity to Mandi. There are plans to construct a Jammu–Poonch line which will connect Jammu with Poonch with railways. The nearest major railway station is Jammu Tawi railway station located 240 kilometres from Mandi.

=== Road ===
The tehsil is connected to other places in Jammu and Kashmir and India by the NH 144A and other intra-district roads.

== See also ==
- Poonch
- Jammu and Kashmir
- Rajouri
- Surankote
- Jammu
