= Military operations in Poonch (1948) =

Part of Indo-Pakistani war, 1947–1948

Operation Easy. Poonch link-up 1 November 1948 – 26 November 1948

Military operations took place in Poonch district, then part of the princely state of Jammu and Kashmir, in 1948 during the conflict in Jammu and Kashmir between the Indian Army and Pakistani and Azad Kashmir rebel forces. Poonch withstood a siege by these forces from November 1947 until relieved by an Indian offensive, Operation Easy on 20 November 1948. The besieged garrison, commanded by Brig. Pritam Singh, was maintained by air supply. Military operations ended with Poonch town and the eastern part of Poonch district in Indian hands and western part of the Poonch district in Pakistani hands.

== Threat to Poonch ==
Poonch is a small town in Western Jammu, on the confluence of Batar and Suran rivers, which forms the Poonch river. In 1947, it was the seat of the Raja who was a vassal of Maharaja Hari Singh of Jammu and Kashmir. Prior to 1947, communications with Poonch were through the Punjabi town of Jhelum; towns in the east such as Rajauri, Naushera and Jammu being connected only by fair-weather tracks.

Pakistan had targeted Poonch district, which had a large population of Muslim serving and retired soldiers, as an important objective. Pakistani forces comprised regular soldiers, ex-servicemen of Royal Indian Army (AKRF – Azad Kashmir Regular Force) and Pashtun tribals, along with Muslim Poonchies inflamed by reports of massacre of Muslim refugees during the communal violence of partition.

The attackers infiltrated Poonch, as part of Operation "Gulmarg", as a springboard to capture the Jammu region. The town was threatened by the raiders when the headquarters of Jammu and Kashmir forces decided to reinforce it from the North.

The relief of Poonch from Jammu was exacerbated by the fact that it lay across many kilometers of hilly terrain with poor communications. Paucity of troops, the need to secure the line of communication and to establish a firm base delayed its relief. The massacre of the populations of the surrounding areas, not only swelled the refugee population in Poonch, but also led to Pandit Nehru's insisting that it be held.

== Reinforcement of Poonch ==
A total of 40,000 refugees sheltered in Poonch fleeing from tribal atrocities in the West. Since the state forces were grossly inadequate to fend off the raiders, a decision to reinforce the garrison was made by Maj Gen Kalwant Singh, commander of Jammu and Kashmir forces. An attempt by 50 Parachute Brigade, under Brig. Y.S. Paranjpye, was planned. The brigade faced difficult terrain and tough opposition and was not able to relieve Poonch. 161st Infantry Brigade, which had pushed the raiders back to Domel on the Muzzafarabad-Srinagar route, was tasked to link up with Poonch from the North.

Just before Poonch was contacted by the raiders, the town was reinforced on 22 Nov 47 by a column from 161 Brigade which left behind an infantry battalion, 1st Battalion (Parachute), Kumaon Regiment (1 KUMAON) under Lieutenant Colonel (later Brigadier) Pritam Singh who became the commander of Poonch garrison. There was also an understrength brigade of J&K State Forces under Brig. Kishen Singh already present in Poonch which came under command of the Indian Army.

In January 1948, another battalion of infantry, the 3rd Battalion, 9 Gorkha Rifles (3/9 GR) was airlifted into Poonch to bolster the defences.

== Siege of Poonch ==
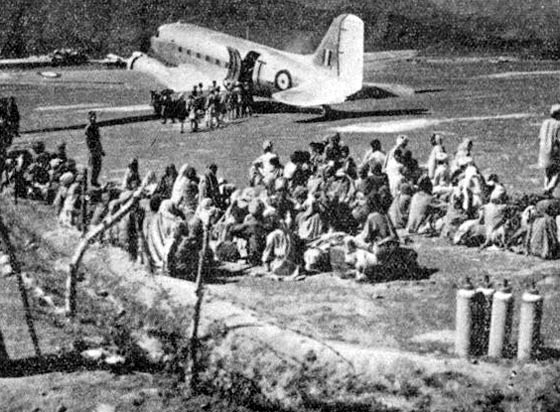
Refugees awaiting evacuation by Dakota on Poonch airstrip, December 1947.

Poonch was isolated by the raiders soon after the reinforcement. Brig. Pritam Singh organised the defenses with regular troops, stiffening them with the State Forces and two ad hoc militia battalions, organised from the refugees. The defenders kept the besiegers at bay by vigorous patrolling and fierce small unit actions. An air strip suitable for Dakotas was fashioned using the besieged civilians as labour.

On 12 December 1947, Wing Commander Mehar Singh, accompanied by Air Vice Marshal Subroto Mukerjee, carried out a daring trial in a Harvard on the makeshift airstrip. The same day, the first Dakotas landed on Poonch airstrip carrying with them a complete section of mountain artillery. Thereafter the fledgling Royal Indian Air Force began what they called the "Punching" drive, an air bridge of Dakotas, first by day and later by night. The air bridge flew in supplies and flew out refugees, despite interdiction by Pakistani mountain artillery, to counter which Indian 25 pounder guns were flown in.

The air force also attacked the Pakistani columns with Tempests and Harvards. Attacks on Poonch reduced during summer due to the protracted operations in the Uri sector and were resumed in August 1948, necessitating an immediate relief of Poonch.

Poonch was referred to as the "Tobruk of Kashmir", though unlike Tobruk, it never fell.

== Operation Easy ==
A relieving force under Brig. Yadunath Singh was assembled at Rajauri, which eventually grew to be division-sized, comprising 5 and 19 Infantry Brigade as well as "Rajauri column" with supporting field artillery and two troops of Sherman tanks of the Central India Horse. The codename of the operation was "Operation EASY" to make the complex operation appear psychologically easier to execute.

The operation commenced on the night of 6/7 November with 5 Brigade advancing on the right of the axis of advance and 19 Brigade on the left flank. Bhimber Gali, captured by the two brigades, and Ramgarh fort, captured by Rajauri Force, were the first features to be captured. In the meantime, 268 Infantry Brigade carried out OP RANJIT in which it captured Pir Badesar, a tactically strong locality overlooking the Seri valley which protected Jhangar from the north and posed a direct threat to Kotli and thus protected the flank of the advance from a Pakistani threat to the line of communication near chingas.

19 Infantry Brigade came across determined opposition at Point 5372, a feature southeast of Mendhar, which guarded the route to Kotli. Continuing to demonstrate against Point 5372 as a ruse, the major force was switched to the right flank where opposition was light. These two brigades then captured Pt 5982 and Topa ridge south of Poonch. On 20 November, the Poonch garrison broke through to the south over the hills for the linkup. On 23 November, Mendhar was a captured in a pincer move by 19 Infantry Brigade from the South permitting the Engineers to construct a jeep track via Mendhar to Poonch.

Operation Easy resulted in capture of 800 square miles (2,100 km^{2}) of territory. Large numbers of refugees, including 10,000 Muslims were able to get away and obtain relief from the state administration.

== Aftermath ==
While Poonch was secured, costly gains made by the Indian 161st Infantry Brigade and 77th Parachute Brigade in the Uri sector were lost by ill-advised vacation of Led Gali and Pir Kanthi picquets in the Haji Pir region for the winter by the Indian brigade commander responsible, allowing Pakistan to reoccupy these picquets and occupy a large salient centred on the Haji Pir pass. Before any action could be taken by the Indians to reduce the salient, ceasefire was declared on 2 January 1949 leaving these locations secure in Pakistani hands. Poonch continues to be a border outpost on the Line of Control in between the Indian and Pakistani administered regions of Jammu and Kashmir.

The decision to hold and relieve Poonch saved thousands of civilian lives but at the military cost of diverting troops from the capture of Domel and Muzzafarabad during a period of vulnerability as well as diverting troops from the capture of Mirpur and Bhimber, a more meaningful strategical gambit.

== See also ==
- Indo-Pakistani War of 1947–1948
- 1947 Poonch rebellion
- Operation Datta Khel
- Siege of Skardu
