= Balnoi =

- Village
- Location in Jammu and Kashmir Balnoi (India)
- Coordinates: 33.61°N 73.98°E
- Country: India
- Union Territory: Jammu and Kashmir
- District: Poonch
- Tehsil: Mendhar

Population (2011)
  - Total: 2,425

Languages
  - Spoken: Hindi, Gojri, Pahari, Urdu
- Time zone: UTC+5:30 (IST)
- PIN: 185211
- Vehicle registration: JK-12
- Website: poonch.nic.in

Balnoi is a village and municipality in Poonch district of the Indian union territory of Jammu and Kashmir. The village is located 24 km (15 mi) from the district headquarters, Mendhar.

== Demographics ==
According to the 2011 census of India, Balnoi has 435 households. The literacy rate of Balnoi was 51.03% compared to 67.16% of Jammu and Kashmir. In Balnoi, Male literacy stands at 63.74% while the female literacy rate was 39.47%.

Demographics (2011 Census)
	Total	Male	Female
Population	2425	1167	1258
Children aged below 6 years	538	268	270
Scheduled caste	0	0	0
Scheduled tribe	1286	620	666
Literacy	51.03%	63.74%	39.47%
Workers (all)	897	492	405
Main workers (all)	160	–	–
Marginal workers (total)	737	364	373

== Transportation ==
=== Road ===
Balnoi is well-connected by road to other places in Jammu and Kashmir and India by the NH 144A and other intra-district roads.

=== Rail ===
The nearest major railway stations to Balnoi are Jammu Tawi railway station and Awantipora railway station located at a distance of 233 km (145 mi) and 177 km (110 mi) respectively.

=== Air ===
The nearest airport to Balnoi is Srinagar International Airport located at a distance of 203 km (126 mi) and is a 6.5-hour drive.

== See also ==
- Jammu and Kashmir
- Poonch district
- Poonch
- Chandimarh
