= Mandi (Jammu and Kashmir) =

- Village
- Location in Jammu and Kashmir, India Mandi (India)
- Coordinates: 33.79°N 74.25°E
- Country: India
- Union Territory: Jammu and Kashmir
- District: Poonch
- Tehsil: Mandi

Population (2011)
  - Total: 3,045

Languages
  - Spoken: Hindi, Kashmiri, Pahari, Urdu
- Time zone: UTC+5:30 (IST)
- PIN: 185102

Mandi is a village and municipality in Poonch district of the Indian union territory of Jammu and Kashmir. The town is located 20 km (12 mi) from the district headquarters Poonch.

== Demographics ==
According to the 2011 census of India, Mandi has 855 households. The literacy rate of Mandi was 97.51% compared to 67.16% of Jammu and Kashmir. In Mandi, Male literacy stands at 98.37% while the female literacy rate was 91.71%.

Demographics (2011 Census)
	Total	Male	Female
Population	3,045	2,620	425
Children aged below 6 years	75	36	39
Scheduled caste	57	56	1
Scheduled tribe	46	42	4
Literacy	97.51%	98.37%	91.71%
Workers (all)	2,727	2,497	230
Main workers (all)	2,336	–	–
Marginal workers (total)	391	229	162

== Transport ==
=== Road ===
Mandi village is well-connected by road to other places in Jammu and Kashmir and India by the Rajouri Highway.

=== Rail ===
The nearest major railway stations to Mandi are Jammu Tawi railway station and Awantipora railway station located at a distance of 238 km (148 mi) and 153 km (95 mi) respectively.

=== Air ===
The nearest airport to Mandi is Jammu airport located at a distance of 280 km (170 mi) and is a 10-hour drive.

== See also ==
- Jammu and Kashmir
- Poonch district
- Poonch
- Mandi river, tributary on which the latter Town is located
