= Haveli Tehsil, Jammu and Kashmir =

Haveli
- Tehsil
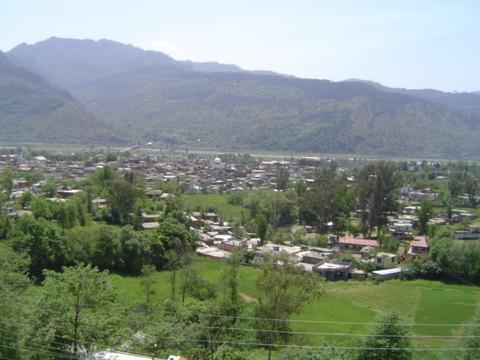
- View of Poonch Town

- Location in Jammu and Kashmir, India Haveli (India)
- Coordinates: 33.77°N 74.24°E
- Country: India
- Union Territory: Jammu and Kashmir
- District: Poonch
- Headquarters: Poonch

Government
  - Type: Tehsil
  - Body: Tehsildar

Languages
  - Official: Gojri, Urdu, English, Hindi, Kashmiri
  - Spoken: Gojri, Kashmiri, Pahari
- Time zone: UTC+5:30 (IST)
- PIN: 185101
- Vehicle registration: JK-12
- Major highways: NH 144A
- Website: www.poonch.nic.in

Poonch district tehsils

The Haveli Tehsil is a tehsil of the Poonch district in the Indian union territory of Jammu and Kashmir. It is headquartered at the Poonch Town.

== History ==
The History of Poonch District of the princely state of Jammu and Kashmir had four tehsils: Haveli and Mendhar in the east, and Bagh and Sudhanoti in the west.

As a result of the First Kashmir War of 1947, the Haveli tehsil got bifurcated, with the northern half passing into Pakistani control and the southern half remaining in Indian-administered Kashmir. The Pakistani half of the tehsil has now been made into a district.

The Haveli tehsil of the Indian-administered Kashmir was further bifurcated into the present Haveli tehsil and the Mandi tehsil based at Mandi.

== Administration ==
The Haveli tehsil is headquartered at Poonch.

== Demographics ==
Religion in Haveli Tehsil (2011)
1. Islam (78.8%)
2. Hinduism (13.8%)
3. Sikhism (6.88%)
4. Christianity (0.35%)
5. Buddhism (0.01%)
6. Not Stated (0.14%)

The total projected population of Haveli Tehsil is 132,767, with 71,538 males and 61,229 females according to the 2011 census of India. The population includes Paharis, Gujjars, Bakerwals and Kashmiris.

== Transportation ==
=== Air ===
Poonch Airport is a non-operational airstrip in the tehsil headquarters Poonch. The nearest airport to Poonch is Sheikh ul-Alam International Airport in Srinagar, located 180 kilometres from Poonch.

=== Rail ===
There is no railway connectivity to Poonch yet. There are plans to construct a Jammu–Poonch line which will connect Jammu with Poonch with railways. The nearest major railway station is Jammu Tawi railway station located 235 kilometres from Poonch.

=== Road ===
The tehsil is well-connected to other places in Jammu and Kashmir and India by the NH 144A and other intra-district roads.

== See also ==
- Poonch
- Jammu and Kashmir
- Rajouri
- Surankote
- Jammu
