= Kallai =

Kallai may refer to:

- Kallayi, a town in Kerala, India
- Kallai River, a river of Kerala, India
- Kallai, Poonch District, Jammu and Kashmir, India
- Kállai, a Hungarian surname
- Kallai (biblical figure)

== See also ==
- Kallai Mattum, a song
- Kallay
