= Mankote =

- Tehsil and Village
- Location in Jammu and Kashmir, India Mankote (India)
- Coordinates: 33.59°N 74.07°E
- Country: India
- Union Territory: Jammu and Kashmir
- District: Poonch
- Tehsil: Mankote

Population (2011)
  - Total: 4,866

Languages
  - Spoken: Gojri, Pahari
- Time zone: UTC+5:30 (IST)
- PIN: 185211

Mankote is a village and tehsil in Poonch district of the Indian union territory of Jammu and Kashmir. The village is located 91 kilometers from the district headquarters in Poonch. The 2 most spoken languages spoken in Mankote is Gojri and Pahari.

== Demographics ==
According to the 2011 census of India, Mankote has 956 households. The literacy rate of Mankote was 54.53% compared to 67.16% of Jammu and Kashmir. Male literacy stands at 66.31% while the female literacy rate was 42.92%.

Demographics (2011 Census)
	Total	Male	Female
Population	4866	2425	2441
Children aged below 6 years	912	463	449
Scheduled caste	0	0	0
Scheduled tribe	2565	1239	1326
Literacy	54.53%	66.31%	42.92%
Workers (all)	1399	924	475
Main workers (all)	464	–	–
Marginal workers (total)	935	516	419

== Transport ==
=== Road ===
Mankote is connected by road to other places in Jammu and Kashmir by the NH 144A and other roads passing through Balnoi

=== Rail ===
The nearest major railway stations to Mankote are Jammu Tawi railway station and Awantipora railway station located at a distance of 246 kilometres and 184 kilometres respectively.

=== Air ===
The nearest airport to Mankote is Srinagar International Airport located at a distance of 210 kilometres.

== See also ==
- Jammu and Kashmir
- Poonch district
- Mankote
