= Colonels Colony =

Area of Jammu and Kashmir, India

Colonels Colony is an area in Jammu within the union territory of Jammu and Kashmir, India. It is surrounded by Talab Tillo Road, Camp Road and Anand Nagar. The population is around 3,000. Most residents are Hindus—Dogra people and Kashmiri Pandits—along with a very small Muslim population along with Sikhs

There is one Hindu temple in the colony, Saraswati Temple, where all the Hindu gods are worshipped.

There is a good road system in the colony. It is connected with Hazuri Bagh in the south. A few nearby places are Akhnoor Road, Talab Tillo, Bohri, Udhayoala, Anand Nagar, Domana and Pounichak. The nearest landmark to the colony is the wine factory Dewan's Modern Breweries.
