= Pritam Singh (soldier) =

Indian general

Brig. Pritam Singh is an Indian Army Officer, born in Dina Village in Ferozpur, Punjab, India. He fought in the Battle of Singapore in 1942. After the war, he was promoted to Lt. Colonel. In 1947, he fought against Pakistan in Poonch.

== Army career ==
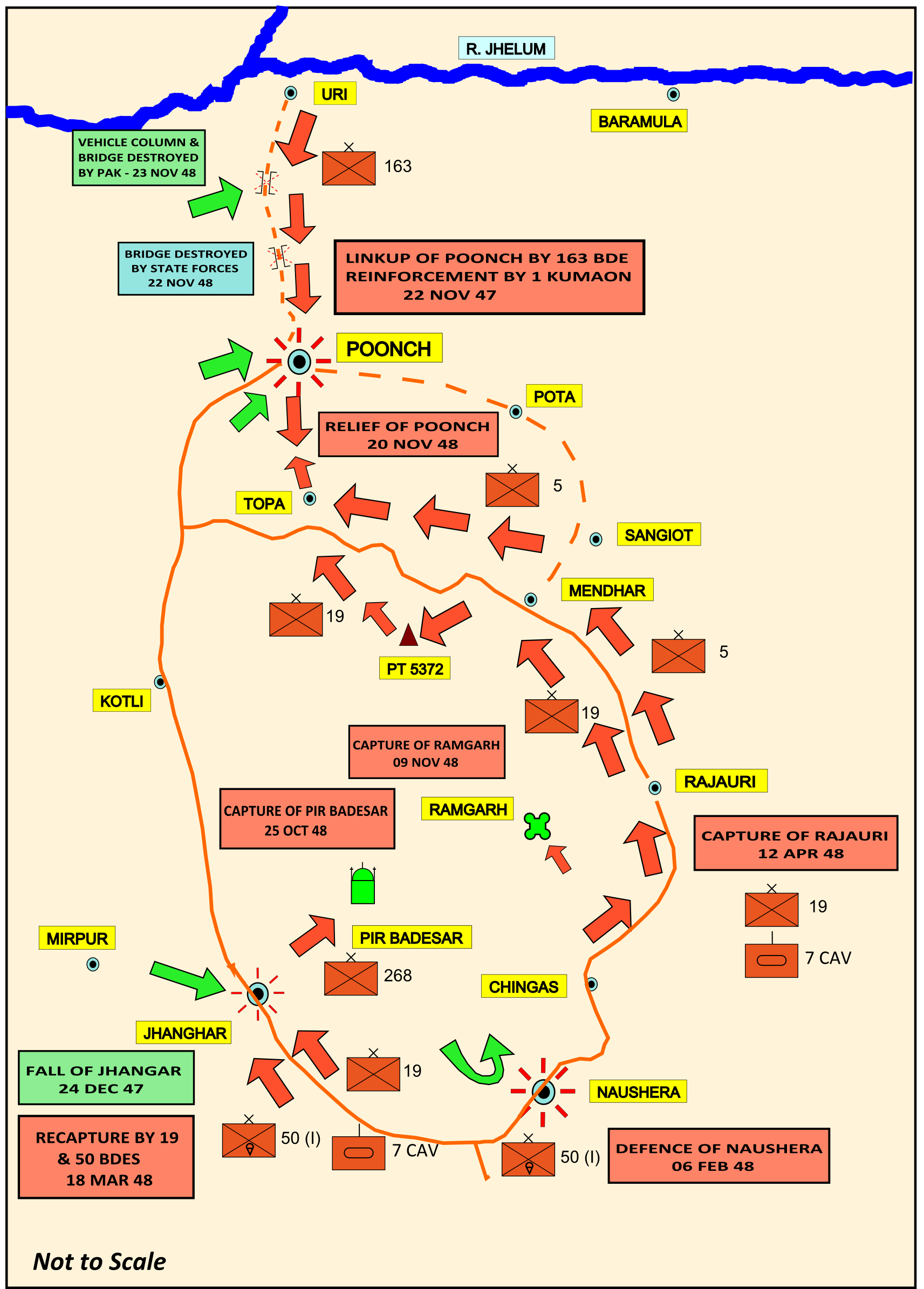
Operation Easy. Poonch link-up 1 November 1948 - 26 November 1948

As a young officer, Pritam Singh fought in the Battle of Singapore in 1942 and was wounded badly. He was imprisoned by the enemy, but escaped from the army camp, and after six months reached Manipur, India. Later, he was awarded the coveted Military Cross for his bravery. Lt Col Pritam Singh was promoted to the rank of Brigadier in December 1948. Poonch withstood a siege by the Pakistan Army from November 1947 till relieved by an Indian offensive, Operation Easy on 20 November 1948. The besieged garrison Singh commanded was maintained by air supply. Military operations ended with Poonch town and the eastern part of Poonch district in Indian hands and western Poonch in Pakistani hands. In 1951, Singh faced a court-martial.

== See also ==
- The Saviour Brig. Pritam Singh
