= Dager =

Dager is a surname and a given name. Notable people with the name include:

- Charles Dager (1927–2016), Republican member of the Pennsylvania House of Representatives
- Dad Dáger (born 1967), Venezuelan actress
- Elwood Dager Cromwell (John Cromwell) (1886–1979), American film and stage director and actor
- Holmes E. Dager (1893–1973), career officer in the United States Army
- Peter "ppd" Dager, aka ppd, American professional Dota 2 player

== See also ==
- Dori Dager, village in Jammu and Kashmir, India
- Dager Ort lighthouse, symbol and tourist site on the Estonian island of Hiiumaa
- Loden Dager, menswear collective based in New York City
