= Bharda Kalan =

Bharda Kalan is a village in Akhnoor Tehsil, Jammu district in Jammu and Kashmir, India.
