= Streptomyces caldifontis =

Scientific classification
- Domain: Bacteria
- Kingdom: Bacillati
- Phylum: Actinomycetota
- Class: Actinomycetia
- Order: Streptomycetales
- Family: Streptomycetaceae
- Genus: Streptomyces
- Species: S. caldifontis

Binomial name
- Streptomyces caldifontis Amin et al. 2017

Type strain
- CPCC 204147, KCTC 39537, NCCP-1331

Species of bacterium

Streptomyces caldifontis is a bacterium species from the genus of Streptomyces which has been isolated from soil from a hot spring from Tatta Pani in Pakistan.

== See also ==
- List of Streptomyces species
