= National Highway 144 (India) =

National highway in India

National Highway 144
- Map of the National Highway in red

Route information
- Auxiliary route of NH 44
- Length: 79 km (49 mi)

Major junctions
- East end: Domel
- West end: Bamla

Location
- Country: India
- States: Jammu and Kashmir
- Primary destinations: Katra

Highway system
- Roads in India; Expressways; National; State; Asian
← NH 44	→ NH 144A

National Highway 144 is a national highway in the union territory of Jammu and Kashmir in India. NH 144 is a branch of National Highway 44.

== History ==
The 8 km section of this highway from Domel to Katra was previously named National Highway 1C before the new numbering system for national highways was introduced.

== Route ==
Domel, Katra, Reasi, Pouni, and Bamla.

== Junctions ==
NH 44 Terminal at Domel junction (formerly NH 1A).
NH 144A Terminal near Bamla.

== See also ==
- List of national highways in India
- List of national highways in India by state
- National Highways Development Project
