= Haveli Tehsil =

Haveli Tehsil may refer to:

- Haveli Tehsil, AK, Azad Kashmir, Pakistan
- Haveli Tehsil, J&K, Jammu and Kashmir, India
