= Balakote =

Balakote Bala Kote
- Village
- Location in Jammu and Kashmir Balakote (India)
- Coordinates: 33.49°N 74.17°E
- Country: India
- Union Territory: Jammu and Kashmir
- District: Poonch
- Tehsil: Balakote

Population (2011)
  - Total: 461

Languages
  - Spoken: Pahari, Gojri
- Time zone: UTC+5:30 (IST)
- PIN: 185211
- Vehicle registration: JK-12
- Website: poonch.nic.in

Balakote (also known as Bala Kote) is a village and tehsil in Poonch district of the Indian union territory of Jammu and Kashmir. The village is located 63 km (39 mi) from the district headquarters, Poonch.

== Demographics ==
According to the 2011 census of India, Balnoi has 103 households. The literacy rate of Balakote was 79.89% compared to 67.16% of Jammu and Kashmir. In Balakote, Male literacy stands at 91.77% while the female literacy rate was 71.16%.

Demographics (2011 Census)
	Total	Male	Female
Population	461	216	245
Children aged below 6 years	88	58	30
Scheduled caste	0	0	0
Scheduled tribe	55	20	35
Literacy	79.89%	91.77%	71.16%
Workers (all)	314	132	182
Main workers (all)	46	–	–
Marginal workers (total)	268	104	164

== Transportation ==
=== Road ===
Balakote is well-connected by road to other places in Jammu and Kashmir and India by the NH 144A and BG Surankote Road.

=== Rail ===
The nearest railway stations to Balakote are Jammu Tawi railway station and Awantipora railway station located at a distance of 199 km (124 mi) and 161 km (100 mi) respectively.

=== Air ===
The nearest airport to Balakote is Srinagar International Airport located at a distance of 187 km (116 mi) and is a 6-hour drive.

== See also ==
- Jammu and Kashmir
- Poonch district
- Poonch
