= Mangnar =

Mangnar Magnar
- Village
- Location in Jammu and Kashmir, India Mangnar (India)
- Coordinates: 33.68°N 74.09°E
- Country: India
- Union territory: Jammu and Kashmir
- District: Poonch
- Tehsil: Haveli

Population (2011)
  - Total: 3,664

Languages
  - Spoken: English, Hindi, Urdu
- Time zone: UTC+5:30 (IST)
- PIN: 185211
- Vehicle registration: JK

Mangnar is a village in Poonch district, India, Jammu and Kashmir, India. The name is a combination of two words 'mang' means plain and 'nar' means mountain. So this village has mountains in its upper area and has plain in the lower area. Milk selling, agriculture, livestock and government jobs are the main occupation of people. The village has a Gurudwara Sahib, a Temple and a Mosque.

Here, a Madrasa namely Madrsa Kanzul Iman teaches many students about Islamic studies. and also a mosque namely Masjid Taqwa
