= Liaqat Jafri =

Poet and scholar (b. 1971)

Dr.Liaqat Jafri
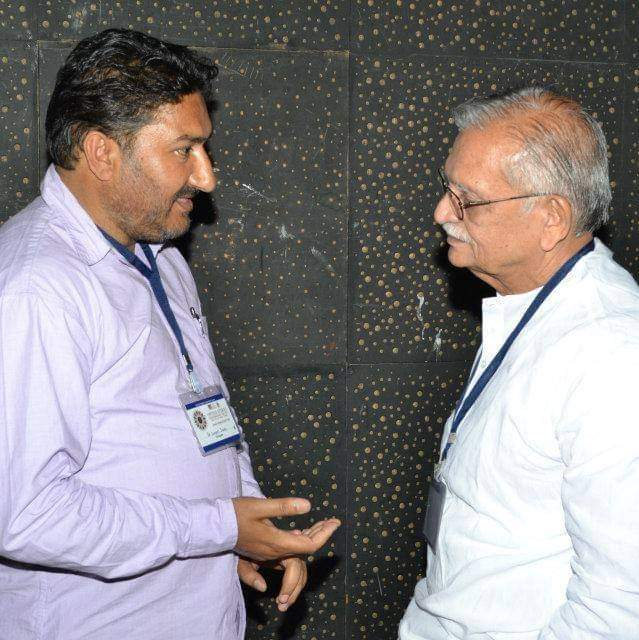
- Born: 18 February 1971 (age 55); Poonch, India
- Education: MA, PhD
- Occupations: Poet, Lyricist
- Writing career
- Genre: Ghazal Song Writer Bollywood
- Subjects: Literature, Philosophy

Liaqat Jafri (born 18 February 1971) is an Indian poet, scholar and researcher of Urdu. He has authored books and serves as editor of Alla Taleem magazine, published by Department of Higher Education, Government of Jammu and Kashmir. He represented Jammu and Kashmir in International Festivals and Mushairas held in UAE, South Asia and elsewhere. His poems have gone viral including his popular poem about Narendra Modi. He writes songs for Bollywood movies.

== Early life ==
He was born in Poonch, a border district in Jammu and Kashmir.He did Ph.D. from University of Jammu in 2003 . Jafri presently lives in Jammu and Kashmir, serving in the Higher Education Department as Professor of Urdu in Jammu and Kashmir. He is an alumnus of University of Jammu.

== Career ==
In 2014, he was appointed as Convenor by Jammu and Kashmir Government to head a Committee constituted for the "Promotion & Protection of Urdu Language in J&K" to formulate the constitution/ bylaws of Jammu and Kashmir Urdu Council. As an Urdu poet he traveled throughout the world in connection with Mushairas, conferences, seminars, etc. Di Liaqat was a member of the Urdu Syllabus experts of J&K State Board of School Education helping prepare textbooks in Urdu for Schools of Jammu and Kashmir. He served on national organisations, including Joint Secretary, Anjuman Taraqqi e Urdu Hind (J&K Chapter), general secretary, Krishan Chander Foundation for Art & Literature J&K, Secretary, Jammu Civil Society for Art & Literature Jammu, Convener, Molana Charagh Hasan Hasrat Award Committee J&K, Member, J&K Urdu Academy Srinagar, Member, Anjuman Farogh e Urdu Jammu and Member, Rangyug Theatre Group Jammu.

== Recognition ==
His awards include:

- Shaheed Lala Jagat Narain Award in 2017 from Hind Samachar Group of Publication.
- Robe of Honour, Government of Jammu and Kashmir, in 2014 .
- Sahita Smriti Yuva Puruskar from Yuva Hindi Lekhik Sangh, Jammu in 2008
- Iftikhar e Adab Award by Himalayan Education Mission, Rajouri J&K in 2011 for his contribution towards Urdu literature.

== List of Books ==
Following main books of Dr. Liaqat Jafri published during last one decade.

- Bayaaz (Poetic Collection of Urdu Ghazal & Nazm's)
- Jadeediyat, Ma’baad Jadeediyat (Research/Criticism)
- Jadeediyay, Faiz se Zafar Iqbal tak (Research/Criticism)
- Jadeed Urdu Shairi, Nazm (Research/Criticism)
- Dabistan E Farsi (Translation Persian to Urdu)
- Ghazalkaar (Hindi Magazine's Guest Editor)

== Other Links ==
- Wasim Barelvi
- Bashir Badr
- Javaid Rahi
