= Battle of Haji Pir Pass =

Part of Indo-Pakistani war of 1965

- Part of the Indo-Pakistani war of 1965
Date	26–28 August 1965 (2 days)
Location	Haji Pir, Pakistan-administrated Kashmir 33°58′46″N 74°05′02″E
Result	Indian victory
Territorial changes	India captures Haji Pir Pass and the 430 km^{2} (170 sq mi) Haji Pir Bulge

Belligerents
India	Pakistan

Commanders and leaders
Brigadier Zorawar Chand Bakshi; Major Ranjit Singh Dyal	Unknown

Units involved
1 Para; 4 Rajput; 19 Punjab; 6 JAK RIF; 4 Sikh LI; 164 Field Regiment; 144 Mountain Battery; B Troop 39 Medium Regiment; 18 Field Battery	1 Brigade and a few Azad Kashmir Regular Force battalions, supported by artillery

Casualties and losses
	Most were killed and captured

The Battle of Haji Pir pass was a military engagement from 26 to 28 August 1965, during the Indo-Pakistani War of 1965 and resulted in India capturing the entire Haji Pir bulge including the 8,652 feet high Haji Pir pass in Pakistan-administered Kashmir.

== Background ==
In April 1965, there were a number of ceasefire violations by Pakistan and in May, Pakistani forces occupied three hill features overlooking the Srinagar – Leh Highway and commenced accurate artillery fire on the highway.

In early August 1965, Pakistan launched Operation Gibraltar with the aim of clandestinely infiltrating a large number of guerrillas into Kashmir to destabilise the region through subversive activities including inciting the local population to rebellion and guerrilla attacks to destroy infrastructure, followed by overthrowing the administration and installing a puppet government. However, Operation Gibraltar failed because the local population did not revolt as expected and also on finding out Pakistan's plans, India launched a counter operation against the infiltrators who were identified, engaged and liquidated.

In response to Pakistan's repeated infiltrations and attempts to destabilise Kashmir, the then Prime Minister of India Lal Bahadur Shastri made a statement "India cannot go on pushing the Pakistanis off its territory. If infiltration continues, we will have to carry the fight to the other side."

== Preliminaries ==
On 15 August 1965, the Indian Army crossed the Ceasefire line (CFL) and recaptured the three hill positions that had been earlier occupied by Pakistan and were being used to disrupt traffic on the Srinagar – Leh Highway. A decision was also taken to capture the Haji Pir Bulge, which was a key hub and ingress route for infiltrations into India.

The plan of attack was a pincer movement, to avoid a frontal assault in order to minimise casualties. The movement from the west [from Uri side] was codenamed Operation Bakshi, and the 19th Infantry Division was tasked with capturing Haji Pir pass and the bulge, and 68 Infantry Brigade was placed under the 19th Infantry Division. The movement from the east was codenamed Operation Faulad and the 25th Infantry Division was tasked with linking up from Poonch in the south of the bulge. 1 Para, 19 Punjab and 4 Rajput were identified as the main strike units while 6 JAK RIF and 4 Sikh LI were held in reserve.

D-Day for the operation was set as 26 August.

== The battle ==
On 26 August 21:30 hours, 1 Para battalion crossed the Ceasefire Line to the west towards Sank, which had well prepared defenses, barbed wires and minefields. The Brigade commander Brigadier Bakshi was himself part of the assaulting force. The assault was carried out in very difficult circumstances, across steep terrain and under heavy rain. However, with covering artillery fire on the Pakistani defenders, the Indian troop was able to advance and by 0415 hours the next morning, the force had attained the objective of Sank. The Pakistan defenders were taken completely unawares, panicked and fled, leaving behind their heavy weapons. After capturing Sank the battalion continued with its advance towards the next features of Sar and Ledi Wali Gali and captured both on the same day.

Major Ranjit Singh Dyal requested and procured permission to press on to Haji Pir Pass. On reaching Haji Pir Pass, they encountered a counterattack by Pakistani forces. Leaving 1 platoon to engage the Pakistani forces, Major Dyal led the rest of his troop and climbed the steep western shoulder of the pass while carrying heavy loads through the rain. Out-flanked, the Pakistani defenders abandoned their weapons and fled down the hill. By 1030 hours on 28 August, Haji Pir pass had been captured. The Pakistani brigade counterattacked on 29 August, but 1 Para repulsed the attack as well as captured a few other features and consolidated its position.

In the meanwhile, 19 Punjab captured Pathra on 26 August. However, 4 Rajput was unable to capture Bedori due to highly rugged and precipitous terrain and having suffered heavy casualties, was forced to pull back. The commander of 19 Punjab volunteered to attack Bedori from a different direction and by 29 August had attained his objective in the face of intense resistance from defending forces. On 5 September, 4 Rajput captured Bisali, but had to fall back to Sank due to an intense counterattack by Pakistani forces. By 10 September, the 93 infantry brigade had linked up with the units and the entire Haji Pir bulge came under Indian control.

== Aftermath ==
India's capture of the entire Haji Pir bulge and Haji Pir pass was a major strategic victory as it neutralised the logistical set up and plugged the ingress routes of infiltrators as well as brought the Poonch - Uri road under Indian control, thus reducing the road distance between these 2 towns from 282 km to 56 km. It was a major achievement for the units involved, who had conducted assaults in extremely difficult terrain and adverse weather conditions against well entrenched Pakistani defences to capture the objectives given.

Brigadier Bakshi and Major Dyal were awarded the Maha Vir Chakra. 1 Para was awarded the Battle Honour Hajipir and Theatre Honour Jammu and Kashmir (1965).

In the subsequent Tashkent agreement, India handed back the hard-won Haji Pir bulge to Pakistan. The handing back of Haji Pir bulge has been criticised by Indian strategic planners because the majority of infiltrations by militants from Pakistan into Jammu & Kashmir continues to happen from this area.

== See also ==
- Bhimber Gali
- Leepa Valley
