= Dori Dager =

Dori Dager is a village located in the Jammu district in the union territory of Jammu and Kashmir, India. Located 75 km (47 mi) from Jammu, Dori Dager is located on the Himalayas. It is also part of proposed Jammu–Poonch line. It is famous for historic Dori Dager Mela. The Mela is a bi-annual feature organised on the eve of Jesth Purnima in summer and Katrik Purnima in winter. Thousands of devotees on these occasions visit the shrine to seek the blessings of Baba Mai Mal Ji.

== Geography ==
Dori Dager is located at 33.02°N 74.54°E and is about 28 km far from Kaleeth. It is a hilly region which falls under chambh sector. It lies near to the border of Pakistan.
