= Kaleeth =

- village
- Location in Jammu and Kashmir, India Kaleeth (India)
- Coordinates: 32.878849°N 74.542820°E
- Country: India
- State: Jammu and Kashmir
- District: Jammu

Languages
  - Official: Urdu Dogri
- Time zone: UTC+5:30 (IST)
- Vehicle registration: JK02

Kaleeth is a village panchayat located in the Jammu district in the union territory of Jammu and Kashmir, India. Located 40 km (25 mi) from Jammu, Kaleeth is located in the foothills of the Himalayas. It is also part of proposed Jammu–Poonch line.

== Geography ==
Kaleeth is located about 18 km far from Akhnoor. It is a hilly region which falls under chambh sector. It lies near to the border of Pakistan. The border of Pakistan can clearly be seen from the height of this place. Kaleeth also have ancient temples, mosques, and a churches. Mainly it was known as a strategic advantage point to be used in war because of the Fort that was made there and was awarded to Colonel Shiv Ram Singh along with the nearby forest land by the Ruler of Riyasat of Jammu and Kashmir.
