= Kállai =

Kállai is a surname. Notable people with the surname include:

- Ákos Kállai (born 1974), Hungarian modern pentathlete
- Ernő Kállai (1890–1954), Hungarian art critic
- Ferenc Kállai (1925–2010), Hungarian film actor
- Gábor Kállai (1959–2021), Hungarian chess grandmaster
- Gyula Kállai (1910–1996), Hungarian politician
- Kevin Kállai (born 2002), Hungarian footballer, brother of Zalán
- Lipót Kállai (1912–1989), Hungarian footballer
- Mária Kállai (born 1957), Hungarian politician
- Norbert Kállai (born 1984), Hungarian footballer
- Zalán Kállai (born 2004), Hungarian footballer
- Zoltán Kállai (born 1984), Hungarian artistic gymnast

== See also ==
- Kállay
- Kallai (disambiguation)
