= Kallai, Jammu and Kashmir =

Kallai Kalai
- City
- Location in Jammu and Kashmir, India Kallai (India)
- Coordinates: 33.68°N 74.19°E
- Country: India
- Union Territory: Jammu and Kashmir
- District: Poonch

Languages
  - Spoken: English, Hindi, Gujari, Pahari, Urdu
- Time zone: UTC+5:30 (IST)
- PIN: 185101

Kallai is the twin city of Poonch in the Indian union territory of Jammu and Kashmir. Most inhabitants are literate and are associated with agriculture.
