= Bhambla =

Village panchayat in India

Bhambla is a village panchayat in the Reasi district in the union territory of Jammu and Kashmir, India. It is also part of proposed Jammu–Poonch line. Kaleeth is located at 33.03°N 74.59°E and is about 36 km from Akhnoor. It is a hilly region which falls under chambh sector. It lies close to the Pakistan border.
