= Khour Deonian =

Indian town

Khour Deonia
- Town
- Location in Jammu and Kashmir, India Khour Deonia (India)
- Coordinates: 32.550°N 74.756°E
- Country: India
- Union Territory: Jammu and Kashmir
- District: Jammu
- Elevation: 279 m (915 ft)

Population (2011)
  - Total: 2,480

Languages
  - Official: Hindi, Punjabi, Dogri
- Time zone: UTC+5:30 (IST)
- PIN: 181101
- Vehicle registration: JK02

Khour Deonia is a town, near the city of Jammu in Jammu district in the Indian union territory of Jammu and Kashmir. The town is named after a Rajput clan Deonia who are settled here for many decades.

== Geography ==
Khour Deonia is located at 32.550°N 74.756°E. It has an average elevation of 279 metres (915 feet).

== Demographics ==
As of 2011 India census, Khour Deonia had a population of 2,480 with 547 households. Males constitute 53.5% of the population and females 46.5%. Khour Deonia has an average literacy rate of 71%, higher than the national average of 59.5%: male literacy is 56.3%, and female literacy is 43.7%. In Khour Deonia, 11% of the population is under 6 years of age. Majority of the residents are Hindu Rajput with Manhas being the largest clan, and there is also a prominent population of Sikhs.
