= Kállay =

Kállay, or Kallay, is a surname. Notable persons with that name include:

- Kállay family, a Hungarian noble family
  - Béni Kállay (1839–1903), Austro-Hungarian statesman
  - Tibor Kállay (1881–1964), Hungarian politician
  - Miklós Kállay (1887–1967), Hungarian politician
- Gyula Kállai (1910–1996), Hungarian Communist politician
- Gabor Kallai (1959–2021), Hungarian chess Grandmaster
- Norbert Kállai (born 1984), Hungarian football player
- Foday Kallay, Sierra Leonian rebel group leader

== See also ==
- Kállai
