= Chowki Choura =

Sub-Division in Jammu and Kashmir, India

Chowki Choura, Akhnoor, is a subdivision in Jammu district in Jammu and Kashmir, India.

Located 50 km (31 mi) from Jammu and 640 km from National Capital Delhi, Chowki Choura is located in the foothills of the Himalayas. The town is located on the bed of Kali Dhar Range surrounded by Khadhandhara Valley on east side of it. The Chowki Choura used to be in Akhnoor Tehsil. On 21 October 2014 Chowki Choura was bifurcated from Akhnoor Sub-Division. Chowki Choura subdivision comprises Chowki Choura tehsil, Chowki Choura block, and Chowki Choura Education. It is also part of the proposed Jammu-Akhnoor-Rajouri-Poonch Rail Line. Chowki Choura Tehsil comprises Ghar Majoor, Chowki Choura, and Rah Salyote Niabats.

== Geography ==
Chowki Choura, Akhnoor, Jammu is located at 32.87°N 74.73°E. It has an average elevation of 301 metres (988 ft). Chowki Choura is located at the right bank of the Tawi River. The Tawi merges with Chenab River at Kathar Village (Mera Mandrian Tehsil). On the north and east, the Shiwaliks, Kali Dhar and Trikuta range surround it. Chowki Choura lies on Jammu-Rajouri-Poonch National Highway 144-A about 28 km away from Akhnoor. It connects with Rajouri District on North, Reasi district on the east and Khour tehsil on the west.

== Demographics ==
As of 2011 India census, Chowki Choura had a population of 1,145. Males constitute 52% of the population and females 48%. Chowki Choura has an average literacy rate of 78%, higher than the national average of 59.5%; with 56% of the males and 47% of females literate.

The languages spoken are Dogri followed by Gojri, Hindi and English.
