= Tatta Pani, Azad Kashmir =

Tatta Pani
- Village
- Tatta Pani hot water springs
- Interactive map of Tatta Pani
- Coordinates: 33.6055693°N 73.9481382°E
- Country: Pakistan
- Territory: Azad Kashmir
- District: Kotli District
- Elevation: 682 m (2,237 ft)
- Time zone: PKT
- Postal code: 11160

Tatta Pani (Urdu: تتہ پانی, lit. 'Hot waters') is a settlement in Kotli District of Azad Kashmir, administered by Pakistan. The area which lies on the riverside of Poonch at a distance of 26 kilometres (16 mi) from the district headquarters Kotli, is known for its hot water springs.

== Source ==
- Anees, Muhammad; Shah, Mumtaz M.; Qureshi, Aziz A. (2015). "Isotope Studies and Chemical Investigations of Tattapani hot Springs in Kotli (Kashmir, NE Pakistan): Implications on Reservoir Origin and Temperature". Procedia Earth and Planetary Science. 13: 291–295. Bibcode:2015PrEPS..13..291A. doi:10.1016/j.proeps.2015.07.068.

Media related to Tatta Pani, Azad Kashmir at Wikimedia Commons
