= Poonch River =

River in India and Pakistan

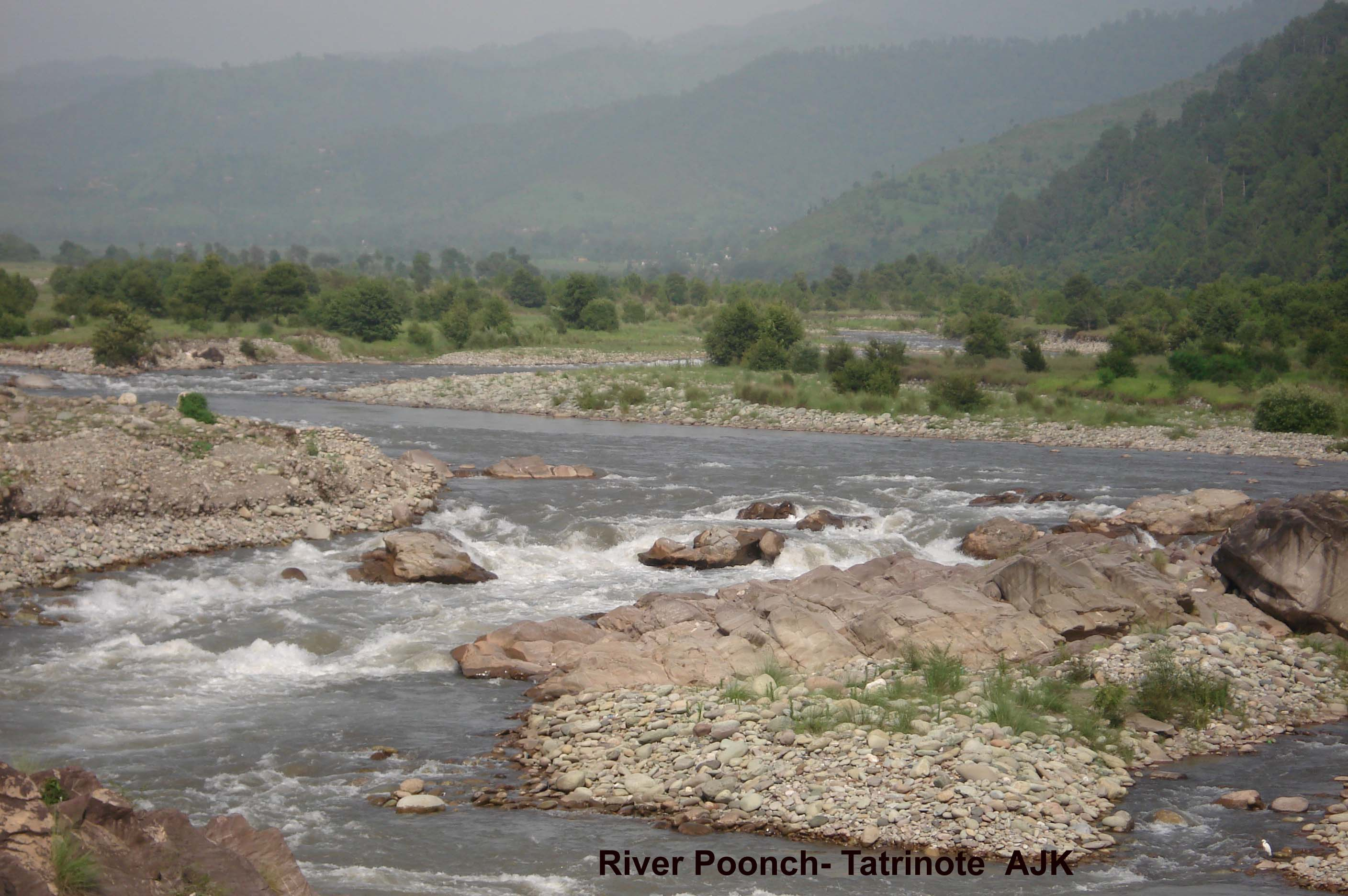
- Poonch River

- Location within Kashmir

Location
- Countries: India, Pakistan
- Provinces: Jammu and Kashmir, Azad Kashmir

Physical characteristics
- Source
  - location: Poonch district, Jammu and Kashmir, India
  - coordinates: 33.64511°N 74.43532°E
- Mouth
  - location: Mangla Reservoir, Kotli District, Azad Kashmir, Pakistan
  - coordinates: 33.2896°N 73.7414°E

The Poonch River (also known as Punch River, Punch Tohi, Pulast, and Tohi of Punch (Note: The older forms of "Punch" include "Prunts", "Pulast" and "Parnotsa".)) is a tributary of the Jhelum River that flows through Jammu and Kashmir in India, and Azad Kashmir in Pakistan.

== Name ==
According to Georg Bühler, the ancient form of the word Tohi is Taushi mentioned in the Rājataraṅgiṇī and the Nīlamata Purāṇa. In the latter work, Āpagā (Aik Nala of Sialkot), Tauśī and Candrabhāgā are named together. Probably, the word is connected with the Sanskrit tuṣāra, 'cold', i.e. 'snow'.

== Course ==
The river originates in the south-facing foothills of Pir Panjal range, in the areas of Neel-Kanth Gali and Jamian Gali. It is called 'Siran' (Suran) in this area. It flows south and then west until it reaches the town of Poonch, after which it bends southwest, finally draining into the Mangla Reservoir near Chomukh. The towns of Poonch, Sehra, Tatta Pani, Kotli and Mirpur are situated on the banks of this river.

== Tributaries ==
Frederic Drew wrote of the Poonch river in 1875:

it drains a large area of mountain country, collecting a number of streams that rise in the lofty Panjäl Range; indeed it combines all those which spring from that part of the Range north or north-west of the branching off of the Ratan ridge. It drains also a considerable area occupied by the mountains of intermediate height, and no small space of the lower, outer, hills.

The prominent tributaries of the river are:

- Mandi (33.7409°N 74.1869°E),
- Nimbal Katha (33.7560°N 74.1432°E),
- Darungli (33.7613°N 74.1319°E),
- Betaar (33.761°N 74.0777°E),
- Ranguri (33.7548°N 74.0357°E),
- Rangar (33.7238°N 73.9526°E),
- Menthar (33.6558°N 73.9714°E),
- Nail (33.5354°N 73.9155°E),
- Baan (33.5021°N 73.8774°E),
- Mahuli (33.4233°N 73.8506°E), and
- Khad (33.3492°N 73.7621°E).

The Betaar Nala, which originates in the Azad Kashmir's Haveli District and flows southwest to join the Poonch river near the Poonch town, is sometimes called the 'Punch River'. (The upstream part of Poonch river is then called the Suran river.)

== Environment ==
The Mughal Road from Shopian circles around the origin of the Poonch River and runs along its banks.

The Parnai hydropower project, under construction near Bafliaz in India's Poonch district, is expected to generate 37.5 Mega Watt power and also irrigate vast tracts of agricultural land in the district. The project was set for completion in 2017–18 but is delayed.

The 100 MW Gulpur Hydropower Project is located on this river in Azad Jammu and Kashmir.
