= Jammu–Poonch line =

Jammu–Akhnoor-Sunderbani-Nowshera-Rajouri-Poonch Railway line

Overview
- Status: Proposed
- Locale: Jammu and Kashmir, India
- Termini: Jammu Tawi; Poonch

Service
- Services: Jammu Tawi–Akhnoor–Kaleeth–Dori Dager–Chowki Choura–Bhambla–Sunderbani–Nowshera–Rajouri–Poonch

Technical
- Line length: 234.12 km (145.48 mi)
- Number of tracks: 1
- Track gauge: 5 ft 6 in (1,676 mm)
- Electrification: proposed

The Jammu–Akhnoor-Sunderbani-Nowshera-Rajouri-Poonch Railway line is a proposed railway line from Jammu Tawi station via the Historic City of Akhnoor to Poonch via Kaleeth-Dori Dager-Chowki Choura-Bhambla-Nowshera-Rajouri. Union Railways Minister Ashwini Vaishnaw’s announcement of revival of Jammu-Rajouri railway project has been widely welcomed in the Jammu region. The twin border districts of Rajouri and Poonch are not connected by railways though there is heavy deployment of security forces on the Line of Control (LoC). Strategically, the railway line can prove to be a game changer as it will pass through vulnerable spots like Akhnoor, Nowshera and onwards to Rajouri town.

The ex-railway minister of India, Mukul Roy announced that he is pursuing the inclusion of four critical projects as national projects, which include Bilaspur–Leh line, Jammu–Poonch line, Tanakpur–Bageshwar line and Rupai Siding–Parshuram Kund line.

The new railway line will cost Rs. 7227.85 Crore.

Its also a strategic railway line which helps Army for transporting troops & equipments and other military logistics. Member of Parliament from Jammu-Poonch Lok Sabha Constituency Shri Jugal Kishore Sharma ji also requested that survey for laying of Jammu to Rajouri and Poonch railway line has been completed and provision of funds should be made available soon for laying this new railway line.
