= Akhnoor =

- Town
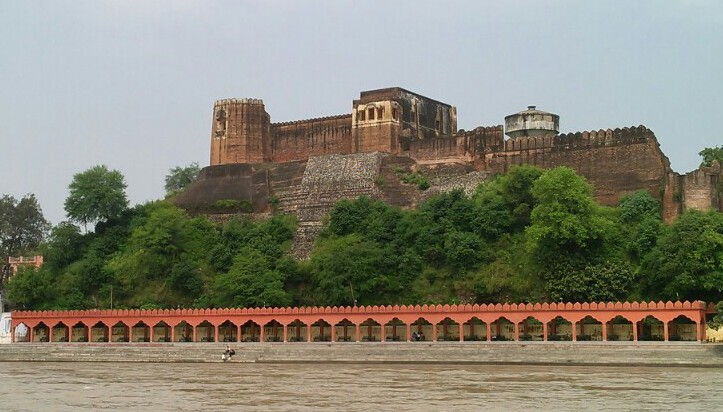
- Akhnoor Fort in Akhnoor, Jammu district, Jammu and Kashmir, India

- Location in Jammu and Kashmir, India Akhnoor (India)
- Coordinates: 32.87°N 74.73°E
- Country: India
- Union Territory: Jammu and Kashmir
- District: Jammu

Government
  - Type: Municipal Committee
  - Body: Municipal Committee Akhnoor
- Elevation: 301 m (988 ft)

Population (2019)
  - Total: 20,756

Languages
  - Official: Hindi

Languages
  - Secondary official: Dogri
- Time zone: UTC+5:30 (IST)
- PIN: 181201
- Telephone code: 91 1924
- Website: www.jammu.nic.in

Akhnoor is a town and municipal committee, near city of Jammu in Jammu district of Indian union territory of Jammu and Kashmir. It lies 28 km away from Jammu city. Akhnoor is on the bank of the Chenab River, just before it enters the Pakistani Punjab. Its border location gives it strategic significance. The Akhnoor area is divided into three administrative sub-divisions - Akhnoor, Chowki Choura and Khour; Seven Tehsils - Akhnoor Khaas, Chowki Choura, Maira Mandrian, Jourian, Kharah Balli, Khour & Pargwal.

== History ==
=== Ancient ===
The place is believed to be the ancient city of Virat Nagar mentioned in the Mahabharata however, Bairat, a town in northern Jaipur district of Rajasthan is more established as the ancient Virat Nagar. The place is one of the most important historical sites in Jammu and Kashmir. Excavations by the Archaeological Survey of India have established the fact that Akhnoor was one of the last bastion of the Indus Valley civilization and Manda, Akhnoor is the northernmost site. Terracotta figures and other anthropological objects belonging to the later Indus period have been found during the excavations. Beyond Akhnoor, towards the upper hilly area that joins Sivalik Hills, there has been no trace of any object that could show that Harappans moved any further beyond this town.

Oil-on-canvas portrait of Virendra Mohan Dar by Thomas Hickey, 1816, Dacca.

Excavations at Ambaran-Pamberwan sites have proved that the place was a prominent abode of Buddhism during the Kushan period and Gupta period. Apart from an ancient an eight-spoke Stupa (a mound-like structure containing Buddhist relics, made of high-quality baked bricks and surrounded by stone pathways, meditation cells and rooms), life sized Terracotta busts of Buddha and coins belonging to those periods were also excavated from the sites. The 14th Dalai Lama visited the place in August, 2012. Buddhist relics from the Pre-Kushan reign and silver caskets, gold and silver leaves, pearls, corals and three copper coins from the Gupta period are reported to be found. The location of the Stupas is such that it lies on the ancient routes from Pataliputra, in present-day Patna, Bihar, in India to Taxila now in Punjab Province, Pakistan. Dar, the now small village in Akhnoor, was a Zamindari Estate to the Dhar family established by Maharaja Virendra Mohan Dar, which later shifted to Dhamrai and Rajrajeshwar in Bangladesh. Among other find of historical importance that indicates the place inhabited by people pre-dominantly belonging to Hinduism is the green coloured Trimurti idol made up of a single stone at Ambarran Village.

=== Modern ===
See Operation Grand Slam in the Chumb-Jourian-Akhnoor sector.

== Etymology ==
The town is believed to have been named Akhnoor by Mughal Emperor Jahangir who once visited the area and the fort on the advice of a saint when his eyes got infected while returning from Kashmir. Amazingly, Jahangir's eyes were fully cured by the fresh air of the town blowing over the Chenab. He called the town Aankho-ka-Noor (light of the eyes) and since then the place has come to be known as Akhnoor. Some believed another etymology which is published in the official site of Akhnoor goes like this:

... it came to be known as Akhnoor during the Mughal reign. The reason behind this is that the Mughal emperor's wife had vision problem in her eyes and she was prescribed to wash her eyes with the holy water of Chenab using some ayurvedic medicines by a local Hindu priest. The queen strictly followed the prescription and her vision was restored. Hence the city was named Akhnoor as in Urdu the word 'noor' means vision/glow/shine and the word 'aankh' means the eye.

— Akhnoor Sub-Division Administration

== Geography ==
Akhnoor is located at 32.87°N 74.73°E. It has an average elevation of 301 metres (988 ft). Akhnoor is located at the right bank of the mighty Chenab. Chenab enters plains at Kathar (Khadhandhara Valley) in Maira Mandrian tehsil of Akhnoor. On the north and east, the Shiwaliks, Kali Dhar and Trikuta range surround it. Akhnoor lies on National Highway 144A that runs between Jammu and Poonch, about 28 km away from Jammu. It connects with Rajouri district on the north, Reasi district on the east and the Khour tehsil (Kharah Balli Tehsil) on the west. It has humid subtropical climate.

== Demographics ==
Religion in Akhnoor City (2011)
1. Hinduism (92.4%)
2. Islam (2.70%)
3. Sikhism (1.91%)
4. Christianity (2.38%)
5. Buddhism (0.05%)
6. Jainism (0.03%)
7. Others (0.05%)
8. Not Stated (0.50%)

As of 2011 India census, Akhnoor had a population of 11,225. Akhnoor is governed by Municipal Committee of Akhnoor having 13 wards. Males constitute 54% of the population and females 46%. Akhnoor has an average literacy rate of 78%, higher than the national average of 74%; with 56% of the males and 47% of females literate.

The languages spoken are Dogri followed by Punjabi, Urdu, Hindi and English.

=== Religion ===
Hinduism is the largest religion in Akhnoor with 92.37% followers. Sikhism, Islam and Christianity are followed by 1.91%, 2.70% and 2.38% people respectively.

== See also ==
- Line of Actual Control (LAC)
- Akhnoor Bulge
- Chicken's neck
- Chicken's neck corridors of Bangladesh and Pakistan
