= Mendhar Tehsil =

Mendhar Dharamsal
- Sub Division
- Location in Jammu and Kashmir Mendhar (India)
- Coordinates: 33.60°N 74.11°E
- Country: India
- Union Territory: Jammu and Kashmir
- District: Poonch
- Headquarters: Mendhar

Government
  - MLA: Javad Ahmed Rana

Languages
  - Official: Gojri, Dogri, English, Hindi, Kashmiri, Urdu
  - Spoken: Gujari, Pahari
- Time zone: UTC+5:30 (IST)
- PIN: 185211
- Telephone code: 01965
- Vehicle registration: JK-12
- Website: poonch.nic.in

Mendhar is a Sub Division (administrative district) in the Poonch district of the Indian union territory of Jammu and Kashmir in the disputed Kashmir region. It is located in the foothills of Pir Panjal range within the Himalayas. The Mendhar Tehsil headquarters is in Mendhar town. It is located 60 km (37 mi) south of the Poonch City, the district headquarters and 210 km (130 mi) from the state winter capital Jammu. It has a total area of 425 km^{2}.

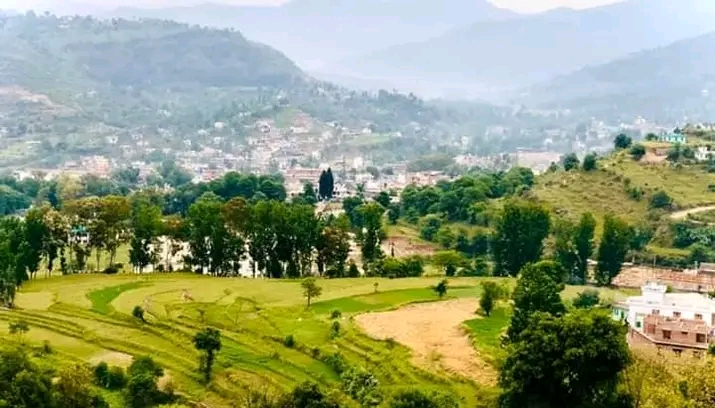
Mendhar Town (Mendhar sub Division, Poonch)

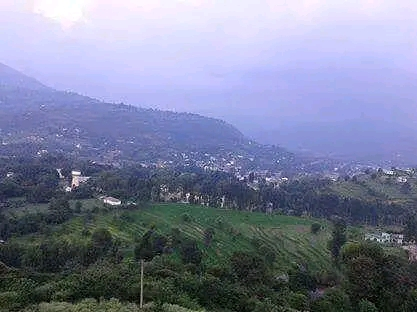
Mendhar town

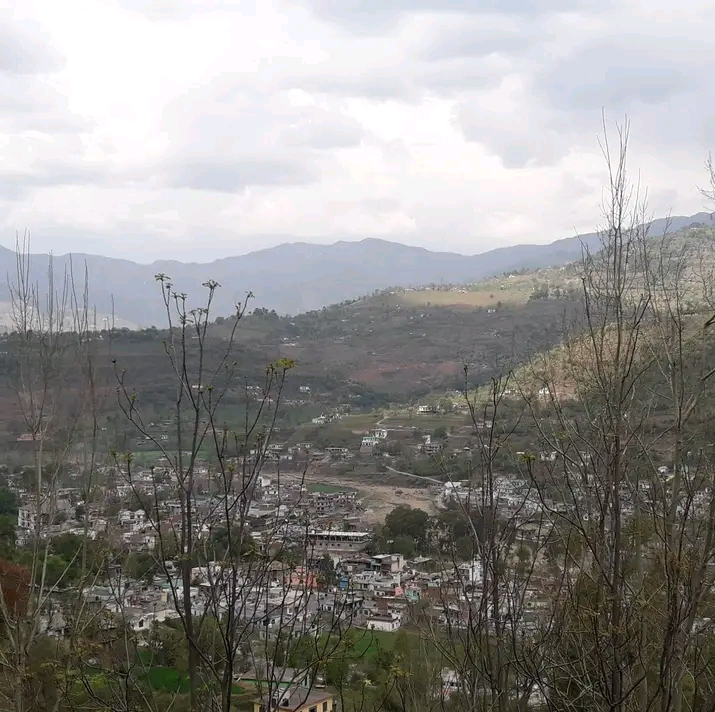
View of Mendhar Town from Gholad village

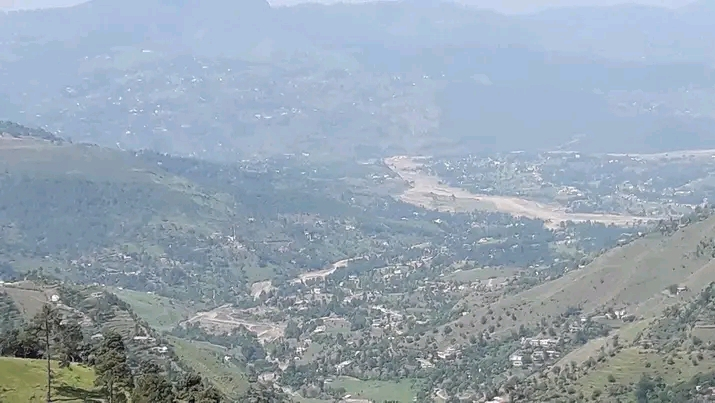
View of Village Salwah from Shahsatar

== Climate ==
The highest summer temperature is in between 19–35 °C (66–95 °F).

The average temperature in January is 9 °C (48 °F); February is 13 °C (55 °F); March is 19 °C (66 °F); April is 24 °C (75 °F); and May is 30 °C (86 °F).

== Demographics ==
Religion in Mendhar Tehsil (2011)
1. Islam (92.7%)
2. Hinduism (6.24%)
3. Sikhism (0.79%)
4. Christianity (0.13%)
5. Buddhism (0.04%)
6. Not Stated (0.12%)

The total projected population of Mendhar Tehsil is 112,723, with 57,723 males and 55,000 females according to the 2011 census of India. The population includes Paharis, Gujjars, Bakarwals and Kashmiris. There are three blocks; Balakote, Mankote, and Mendhar. There are a total of 50 villages and 50 panchayats in Mendhar Tehsil.

== Places of interest ==
=== Krishna Ghati ===
Krishan Ghati is a hilly forest area, located 30 km (19 mi) from Mendhar. The areas near it are dangerous due to continuous ceasefire violations.

=== Ram Kund ===
Ram Kund is the oldest Hindu temple in the Poonch region. It is located in the village of Chajjla, 6 km (3.7 mi) from Mendhar. This temple was built by Lalitaditya between 724 and 761. Ramkund is 8–19 km (5.0–11.8 mi) from Mendhar bus stand. Pilgrims visit during the month of March in Chaitra chawdish.

== See also ==
- Poonch
- Jammu and Kashmir
- Rajouri
- Surankote
- Jammu
