= Poonch Airport =

Airport of Poonch, India

Poonch Airport पुंछ हवाई अड्डे پونچھ ہوائی اڈہ
- IATA: none; ICAO: none

Summary
- Airport type: Military/Public
- Operator: Airports Authority of India
- Location: Poonch, J&K, India
- Coordinates: 33°46′13″N 074°04′59″E

Map
- Location in Jammu & Kashmir, India Poonch Airport (India)

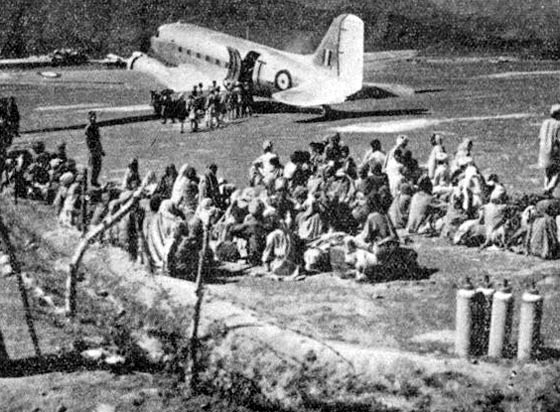
Refugees awaiting evacuation by air on Poonch airstrip, with a RIAF Dacota in the background. c. December 1947

Poonch Airport (also known as Poonch Airstrip) is an airport located in the Poonch district of Jammu and Kashmir, India. Though no scheduled flights operate from Poonch, in 2005, then Chief Minister of Jammu and Kashmir, Ghulam Nabi Azad made a suggestion to Air Deccan that they start flying small aircraft to Poonch. The then Chairman of Air Deccan, Captain Gopinath said that Air Deccan would consider flying helicopters to Poonch.

== History ==
Poonch is of strategic importance, as via Poonch easy access to the Kashmir Valley can be gained. During the Indo-Pakistani War of 1947, the Pakistan Army had surrounded Poonch on 21 November 1947, thereby cutting off all communications with the rest of India. Then Prime Minister of India, Jawaharlal Nehru insisted that the Poonch must not be surrendered, though British Lieutenant General Russel then Commander-in-Chief of the Indian Army thought it was "sheer suicidal" to try to retain Poonch. Though supplies were airdropped, it was not sufficient for the army plus 40,000 refugees.

Lieutenant-Colonel Pritam Singh, commanding the forces in the area decided to build an airstrip in Poonch. 6000 refugees teamed up with army personnel to build a 600-yard dirt strip in 6 days. While the construction activity was taking place, Royal Indian Air Force Spitfire and Tempest aircraft engaged the Pakistani raiders, to make sure they did not intervene in construction efforts. The First RIAF Dakota landed in Poonch on 12 December 1947 carrying in reinforcements and carrying out refugees. The landing was more of a test for the pilot since the area was surrounded by hills on three sides, all of which were occupied by the Pakistani raiders. Many aircraft were hit and damaged in the area. The airstrip was constantly targeted by the Pakistani raiders, especially when an aircraft was about to land. It required courage and piloting skill to land while under enemy fire. Wing Commander Mehar Singh, the first pilot to land in Poonch also became the first pilot to land in Poonch at night, with the help of oil lamps. He did so without any landing aids.

== Incidents ==
- In 2002, the Pakistan Army fired at the airport from across the border. The shelling did not cause any damage at the airport.
- In 2003, a terrorist from the Lashkar-e-Taiba opened fire in the area, injuring an airport guard.
