= National Highway 144A (India) =

National Highway in India

National Highway 144A
- Map of the National Highway in red

Route information
- Length: 230 km (140 mi)

Major junctions
- South end: Jammu
- North end: Poonch

Location
- Country: India
- States: Jammu and Kashmir
- Primary destinations: Akhnoor, Rajauri, Sunderbani, Kalakote

Highway system
- Roads in India; Expressways; National; State; Asian

National Highway 144A, also called the Golden Arc Road, is a national highway in the union territory of Jammu and Kashmir in India. NH-144A is a spur road of National Highway 44 that runs between Jammu and Poonch and is only source of transport for towns including Akhnoor, Sunderbani, Kalakote, Naushera and Rajouri. Many more towns of Rajouri and Poonch district are connected with NH-144A via single or double lane roads.

== Route ==
Jammu, Akhnoor, Bhambla, Sunderbani, Nowshera, Rajouri, Poonch.

== Junctions ==
NH 44 Terminal near Jammu.
NH 144 at Bhambla.

== Tunnels ==
Following four tunnels, listed northwest to southeast, provide all-weather connectivity to the crucial strategic border districts like Rajouri and Poonch while reducing the Jammu-Poounch route length by 32 kilometers and the earlier trave time of 8-10 hours to 4.5 hours.

- Bhimber Gali Tunnel (1.1 km): Part of a larger 16.1 km Kalalali-Bhadadorya bypass aimed to reduce the highway distance by 10.8 kilometers, has target completion date of late 2027.
- Nowshera Tunnel (700 m): Operational, was completed in early 2026.
- Sungal Tunnel (2.79 km): Will reduce travel time across Kalidhar Range by 45 minutes. Expected completion by 20 June 2026.
- Kandi Tunnel (260 m): Operational, was completed in mid 2025.

== See also ==
- List of national highways in India
- List of national highways in India by state
