= Poonch district, India =

Poonch district
- District of Jammu and Kashmir administered by India
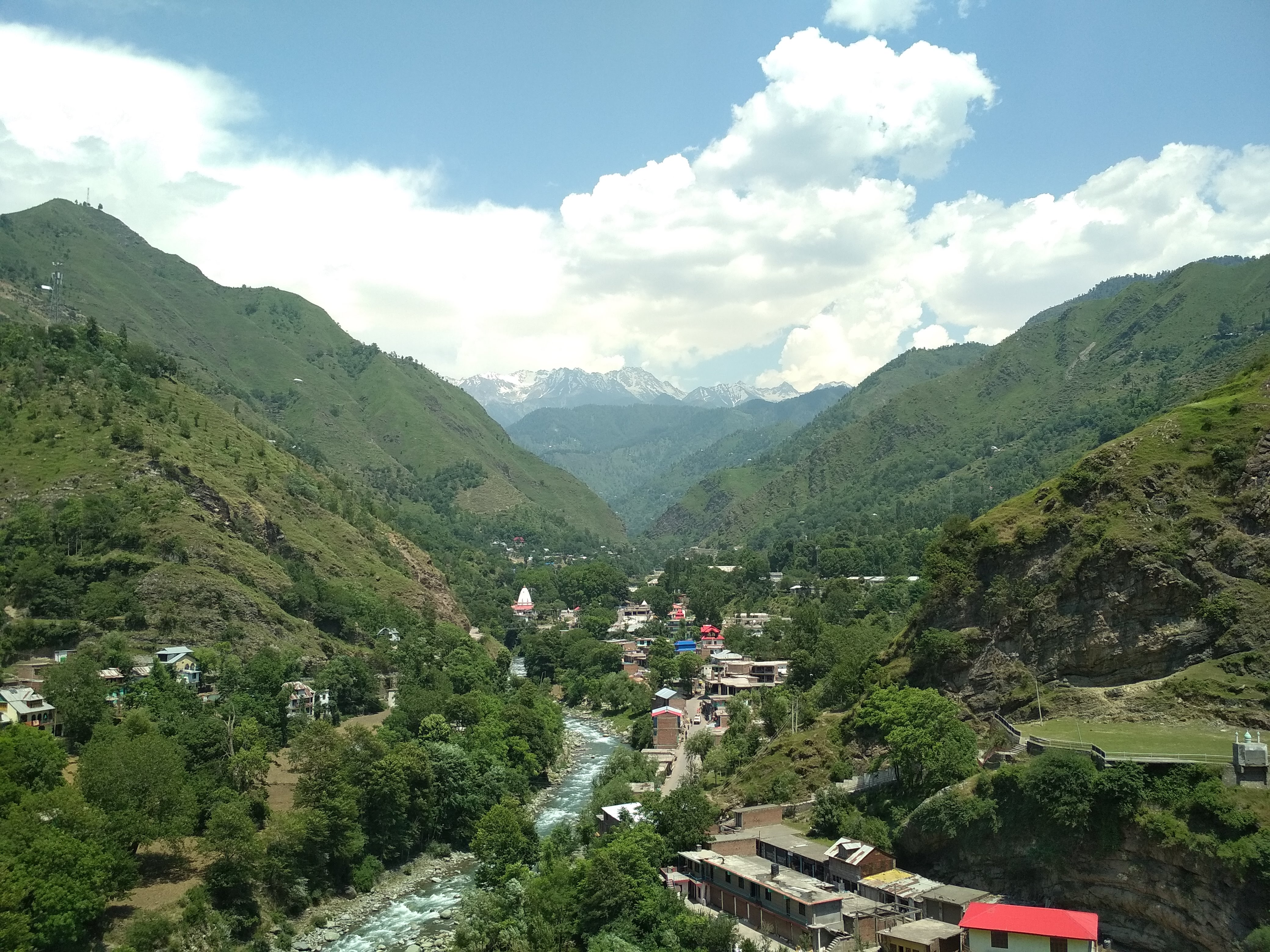
- View of Mandi Town in Poonch
- Interactive map of Poonch district
- Poonch district
- Coordinates (Poonch (town)): 33°42′N 74°14′E
- Administering country: India
- Union Territory: Jammu & Kashmir
- Division: Jammu
- Capital: Poonch
- Headquarters: Poonch
- Tehsils: 1. Balakote, 2. Haveli, 3. Mandi, 4. Mankote, 5. Mendhar, 6. Surankote

Government
  - Lok Sabha Constituency: Anantnag - Rajouri
  - MP: Mian Altaf Larvi, JKNC
  - Vidhan Sabha constituencies: 3 constituencies
  - District Magistrate: Mr. Ashok Kumar Sharma, JKAS

Area
  - Total: 1,674 km^{2} (646 sq mi)
- Highest elevation: 4,760 m (15,620 ft)
- Lowest elevation: 1,007 m (3,304 ft)

Population (2011)228
  - Total: 476,835
  - Density: 284.8/km^{2} (737.8/sq mi)
  - Urban: 8.1%

Demographics
  - Literacy: 66.74%
  - Sex ratio: 893 ♀/ 1000 ♂

Languages
  - Official: Dogri, Kashmiri, Urdu, Hindi, English
  - Spoken: Pahari, Gujari, Kashmiri
- Time zone: UTC+05:30 (IST)
- Vehicle registration: JK-12
- Major highways: NH 144A
- Website: poonch.nic.in

Poonch district or Punch district is a district of the Indian-administered Jammu and Kashmir in the disputed Kashmir region. With headquarters in the town of Poonch, it is bounded by the Line of Control (boundary between Indian and Pakistan administered Kashmir) on three sides (north, west and south). The 1947–48 war between India and Pakistan divided the earlier district into two parts. One went to Pakistan and the other became part of the then-Indian state of Jammu and Kashmir.

== Geography ==
Poonch district has a total area of 1,674 square kilometres (646 sq mi). The district is bordered by Kulgam district, Shopian district and Budgam district in the east, Rajouri district to the south and Baramulla district and Haveli district, Pakistan administered Jammu and Kashmir to the north and Poonch district, Pakistani administered Kashmir to the west.

The district also de jure includes the areas of Poonch Division under Pakistani control (Bagh District, Haveli District, Poonch District, Sudhanoti District).

== Demographics ==
=== Population ===
Historical population
| Year | Pop. | ±% |
|---|---|---|
| 1901 | 102,011 | — |
| 1911 | 112,009 | +9.8% |
| 1921 | 117,759 | +5.1% |
| 1931 | 127,477 | +8.3% |
| 1941 | 140,446 | +10.2% |
| 1951 | 147,489 | +5.0% |
| 1961 | 154,532 | +4.8% |
| 1971 | 170,787 | +10.5% |
| 1981 | 224,197 | +31.3% |
| 1991 | 290,727 | +29.7% |
| 2001 | 372,613 | +28.2% |
| 2011 | 476,835 | +28.0% |
† 1951 and 1991 populations are estimated Source: Census of India

According to the 2011 census Poonch district, India has a population of 476,835, roughly equal to the nation of Suriname. This gives it a ranking of 548th in India (out of a total of 640). The district has a population density of 285 inhabitants per square kilometre (740/sq mi). Its population growth rate over the decade 2001-2011 was 27.97%. Poonch has a sex ratio of 893 females for every 1000 males (which varies with religion), and a literacy rate of 68.69%. 8.10% of the population lives in urban areas. The Scheduled Castes and Scheduled Tribes account for 0.12% and 36.93% of the population of the district. The district is 90.45% Muslim.

=== Social groups ===
Gurjar is a major ethnic group along with Bakarwal of the Poonch district they make up around 48% of the district's total population. Other groups in the district are Mughals, Syeds, Paharis, Kashmiris and Muslim Rajputs.

=== Language ===
Languages of Poonch district (2011)
1. Pahari (50.2%)
2. Gujari (40.4%)
3. Kashmiri (5.37%)
4. Hindi (1.86%)
5. Others (2.17%)

Muslim Gujjars and Bakarwals (subgroup of nomadic Gujars) speak Gujari & Pahari, apart from Kashmiris who speak Kashmiri the rest of the population speak Pahari-Pothwari, mostly Poonchi, which is written in nastaliq script presently, with references of Takri/Tankri as ancient script of the region like other Pahari languages of Himachal Pradesh and Jammu and Kashmir

=== Religion ===
Religion in Poonch district (2011)
| Religion | Percent |
| Islam | 90.45% |
| Hinduism | 6.84% |
| Sikhism | 2.35% |
| Other or not stated | 0.36% |

As of 2011, the proportions of different religions in the district were as follows: Islam (90.45%), Hinduism (6.84%), Sikhism (2.35%), Christianity (0.20%), not stated (0.15%), and others (0.02%).

| Tehsil | Muslim | Hindu | Sikh | Others |
|---|---|---|---|---|
| Haveli | 78.83 | 13.79 | 6.88 | 0.50 |
| Mandi | 96.13 | 2.94 | 0.43 | 0.50 |
| Mendhar | 92.69 | 6.23 | 0.79 | 0.29 |
| Surankote | 96.71 | 2.56 | 0.49 | 0.24 |

=== Sex ratio & literacy rate ===
Only 8.1% of the district's population lived in urban areas. The proportions of religions in urban areas differed from the district as a whole, being: Islam (51.38%), Hinduism (32.82%), Sikhism (14.62%), Christianity (0.96%), not stated (0.20%), and others (0.03%).

Sex Ratio in Poonch District in 2011 Census. (no. females per 1,000 males)
| Religion (and population) | Sex Ratio |
| Muslim (pop 431,279) | 955 |
| Hindu (pop 32,604) | 377 |
| Sikh (pop 11,188) | 722 |
| Other (pop 1,764) | 630 |
| Total (pop 476,835) | 893 |

Poonch district: religion, gender ratio, and % urban of population, according to the 2011 Census.
| | Hindu | Muslim | Christian | Sikh | Buddhist | Jain | Other | Not stated | Total |
|---|---|---|---|---|---|---|---|---|---|
| Total | 32,604 | 431,279 | 958 | 11,188 | 83 | 10 | 2 | 711 | 476,835 |
| Total | 6.84% | 90.45% | 0.20% | 2.35% | 0.02% | 0.00% | 0.00% | 0.15% | 100.00% |
| Male | 23,684 | 220,636 | 614 | 6,497 | 76 | 5 | 1 | 386 | 251,899 |
| Female | 8,920 | 210,643 | 344 | 4,691 | 7 | 5 | 1 | 325 | 224,936 |
| Gender ratio (% female) | 27.4% | 48.8% | 35.9% | 41.9% | 8.4% | 50.0% | 50.0% | 45.7% | 47.2% |
| Sex ratio (no. of females per 1,000 males) | 377 | 955 | 560 | 722 | – | – | – | 842 | 893 |
| Urban | 12,677 | 19,848 | 371 | 5,647 | 8 | 3 | 0 | 76 | 38,630 |
| Rural | 19,927 | 411,431 | 587 | 5,541 | 75 | 7 | 2 | 635 | 438,205 |
| % Urban | 38.9% | 4.6% | 38.7% | 50.5% | 9.6% | 30.0% | 0.0% | 10.7% | 8.1% |

== Administration ==
Poonch district tehsils

The district headquarters is in the Poonch city. Presently, district Poonch in Jammu and Kashmir is divided into six tehsils:

- Haveli Tehsil
- Mandi Tehsil
- Mendhar Tehsil
- Surankote Tehsil
- Mankote Tehsil
- Balakote Tehsil

Each tehsil has its Tehsildar, who is the administrative head. The district is further divided into eleven blocks: Poonch, Mandi, Loran, Sathra, Mendhar, Mankote, Balakote, Surankote, and Buffliaz. The administrative head of each block is the Block Development Officer (BDO). Each block consists of a number of panchayats. Poonch district has a total of 179 villages.

== Economy ==
The local economy depends on agriculture. Industrial environment is absent and commercial activity exists on a very low scale. Peoples have small pieces of land for cultivation of fruits and crops. In 2006, the Ministry of Panchayati Raj named Poonch one of the country's 250 most backward districts (out of a total of 640). It is one of the three districts in Jammu and Kashmir currently receiving funds from the Backward Regions Grant Fund Programme (BRGF).

== Politics ==
Poonch district has three assembly constituencies: Surankote, Mendhar and Poonch Haveli. Poonch district comes in Anantnag-Rajouri constituency. The present MP of Anantnag-Rajouri constituency is Mian Altaf Ahmed Larvi of JKNC.

The current MLAs of Poonch Haveli and Mendhar are Ajaz Ahmed Jan and Javed Ahmed Rana of the JKNC. While Surankote is represented by Independent politician Choudhary Mohammad Akram.

== Transportation ==
=== Air ===
The Poonch Airport is a non-operational airstrip located in Poonch which is mainly used by the Indian Army. The nearest airport is Sheikh ul-Alam International Airport in Srinagar which is located 174 kilometres from Poonch town.

=== Rail ===
There is no railway connectivity to Poonch yet. There are plans to build the Jammu–Poonch line in the near future to connect Poonch with Jammu. The nearest major railway station is Jammu Tawi railway station which is located 235 kilometres from district headquarters Poonch.

=== Road ===
Poonch district is connected to the summer capital Jammu by the NH 144A alongside other intra-district roads. It also has road connectivity with Srinagar through the picturesque Mughal Road. There are plans to upgrade the existing NH 144A to four-lane for faster movement of traffic. A bus across the LOC, the Poonch–Rawalakot Bus has helped to re-establish ties across the border.

== Education ==
The urban area has both govt and private schools but the no of govt schools is significantly higher in rural areas. Most of the govt schools have a MDM(MID DAY MEAL) of nutritious food on a regular basis. The city also has a college named Shri Krishan Chander degree college Poonch offering bachelor courses in fields of humanities, science, commerce, languages, etc. Most schools are affiliated to JKBOSE, whereas schools having CBSE, and ICSE boards are also there.

== Tourism ==
Poonch is well known for its tourism across the country. It has the famous, Budda amarnath temple located in Mandi zone. Other places which are well known are Ziarat Sain Miran Sahib, LOC Trade Centre, Mughal Road & Pir ki Gali, Than Pir, Noori chammb waterfall, Nandishool Waterfall, Poonch view(Mountain Top). Every year in the month of August, a yatra known as chhadi yatra takes place in which people from all over India travel to the city and join the yatra to seek blessings.

The annual Shri Budha Amarnath Ji Yatra remains a significant religious pilgrimage in Poonch, drawing thousands of devotees from across India. Despite intermittent cross-border shelling and civilian casualties caused by Pakistani artillery, the pilgrimage continues with full support from the administration, security forces, and religious organizations. The Budha Amarnath Ji Mela and associated spiritual events are held each year with elaborate arrangements to ensure the safety and well-being of pilgrims.

== Food ==
The city is known for its delicious vegetarian, non-vegetarian and vegan cuisines. Most people here follow a non-vegetarian diet, followed by lacto-ovo-vegetarian, lacto-vegetarian diet. People here follow diet due to personal, cultural, or religious reasons. Various non-vegetarian restaurants serve finger-licking delicious meat dishes of kashmiri cuisine. People here eat a variety of meat like poultry, mutton, lamb, beef, fish and lean meats. The city also serves few vegetarian and vaishnav food in various restaurants. Most fast foods are non-vegetarian. Since the majority is Muslim, halal meat is available in abundance.

== Notable people ==
- Krishan Chander, short stories writer and novelist.
- Chiragh Hasan Hasrat, Urdu poet
- Liaqat Jafri, poet and author
- Ajaz Ahmed Jan, politician
- Aslam Chowdhary Mohammad, former minister
- Javaid Rahi, prominent tribal researcher of India. During last two decades, he wrote around 25 books and edited well over 300 publications/books—covering tribal history, folklore, language, and culture.
- Javed Ahmed Rana, politician

== Gallery ==
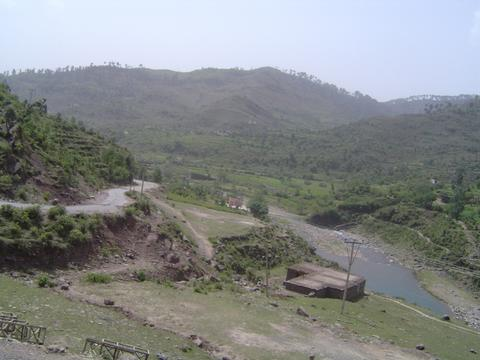

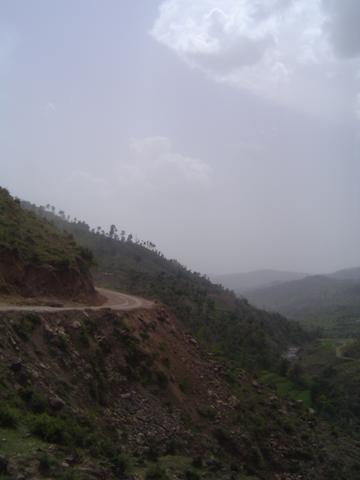

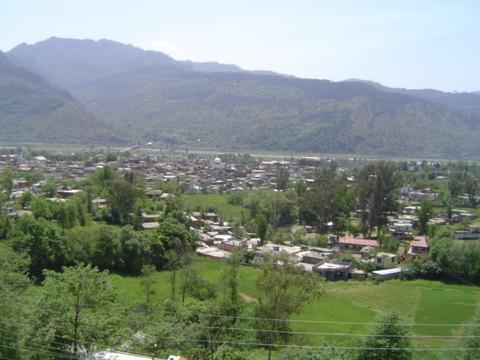

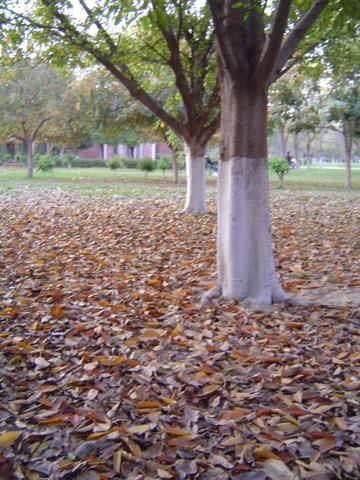

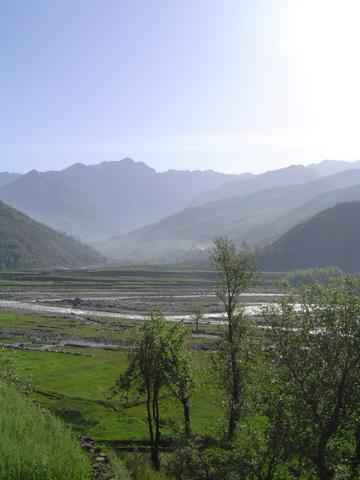

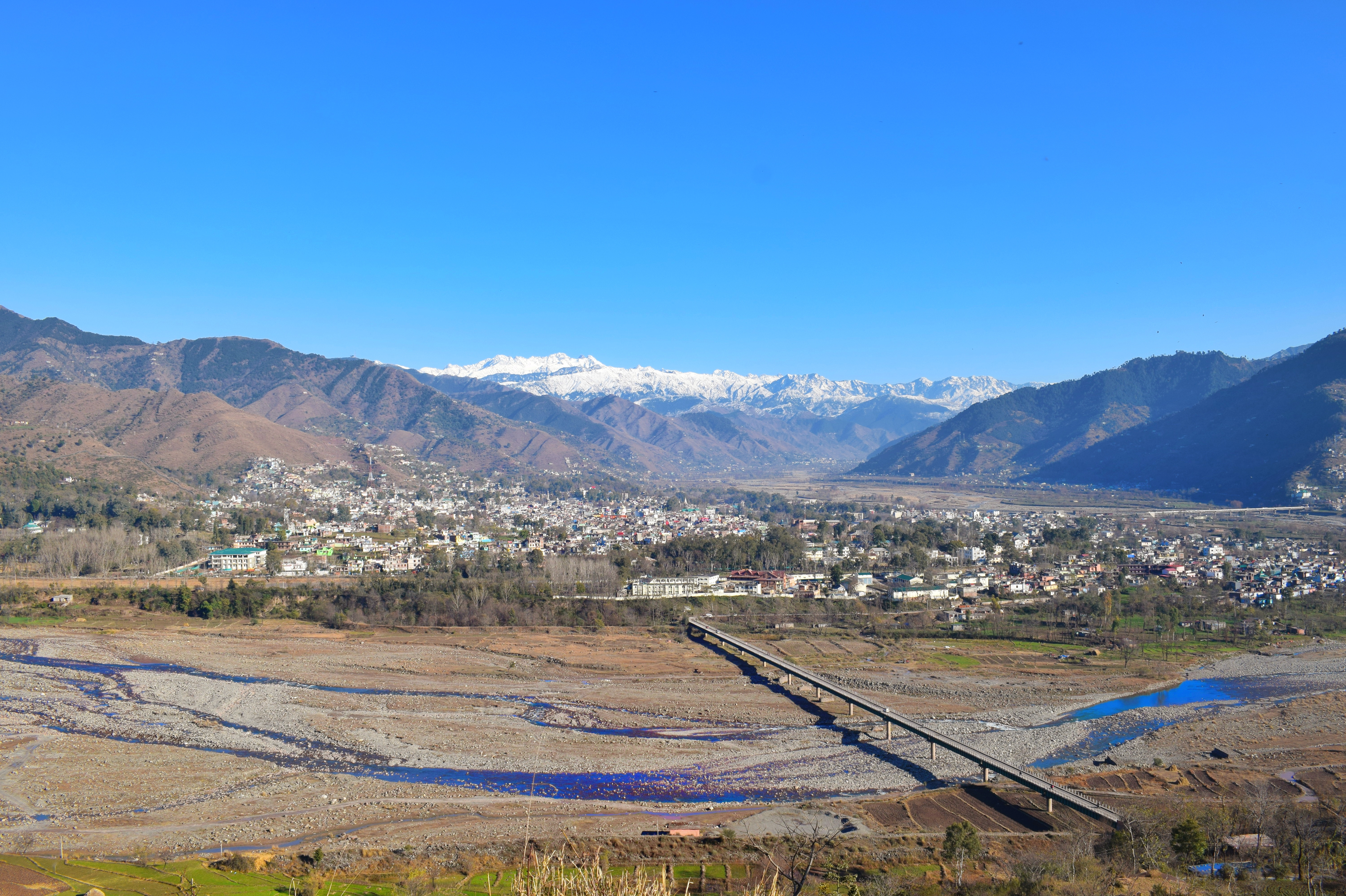
By Naeem

== See also ==
- People from Poonch District, India
- 1947 Poonch Rebellion
- 1963 Poonch Indian Air Force helicopter crash
- Poonchi (disambiguation)
- Moghul road
- Pir Panjal
- Poonch Division (Pakistan)
