= Poonch (town) =

Poonch Prunts Punch
- City
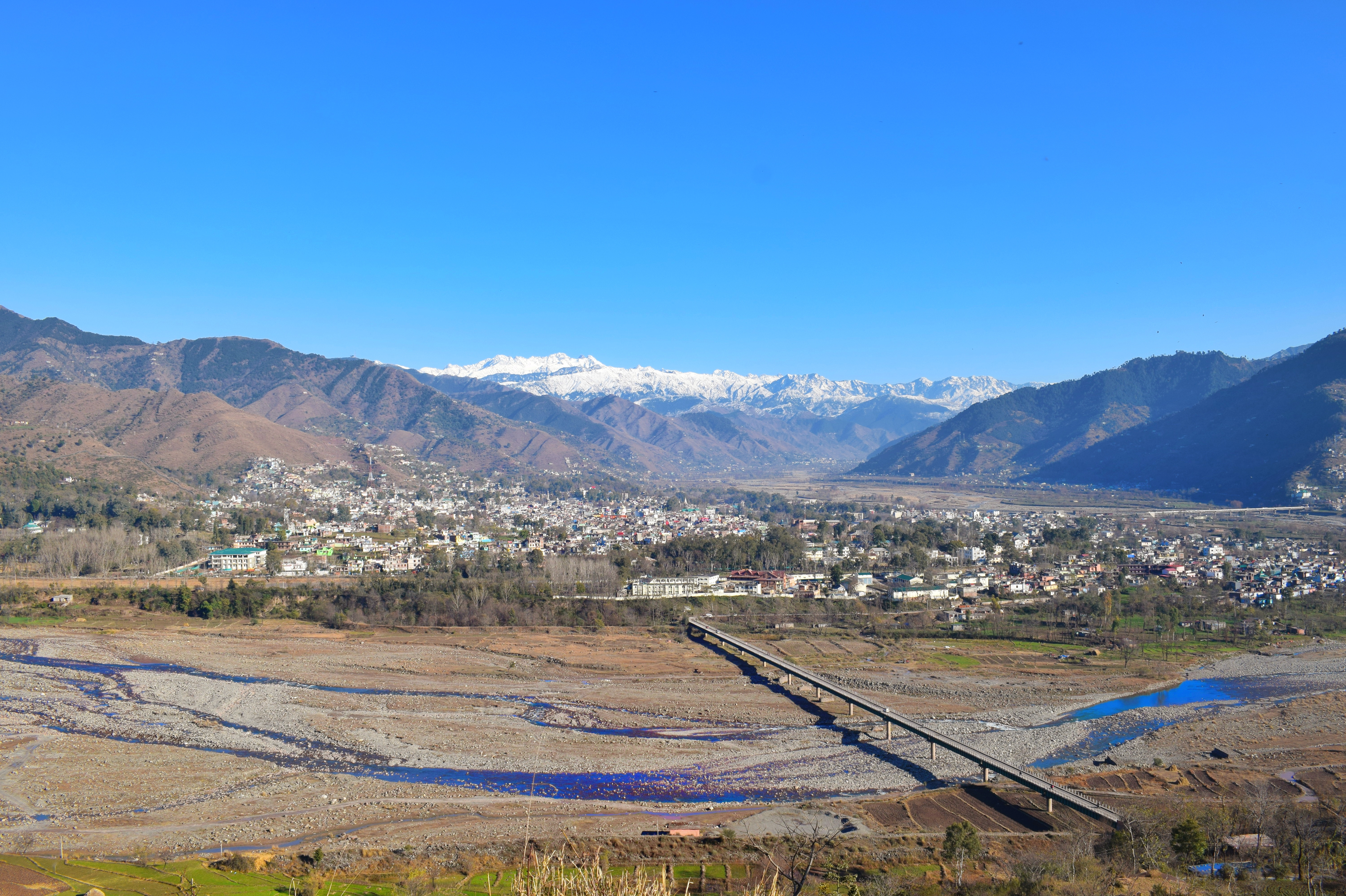
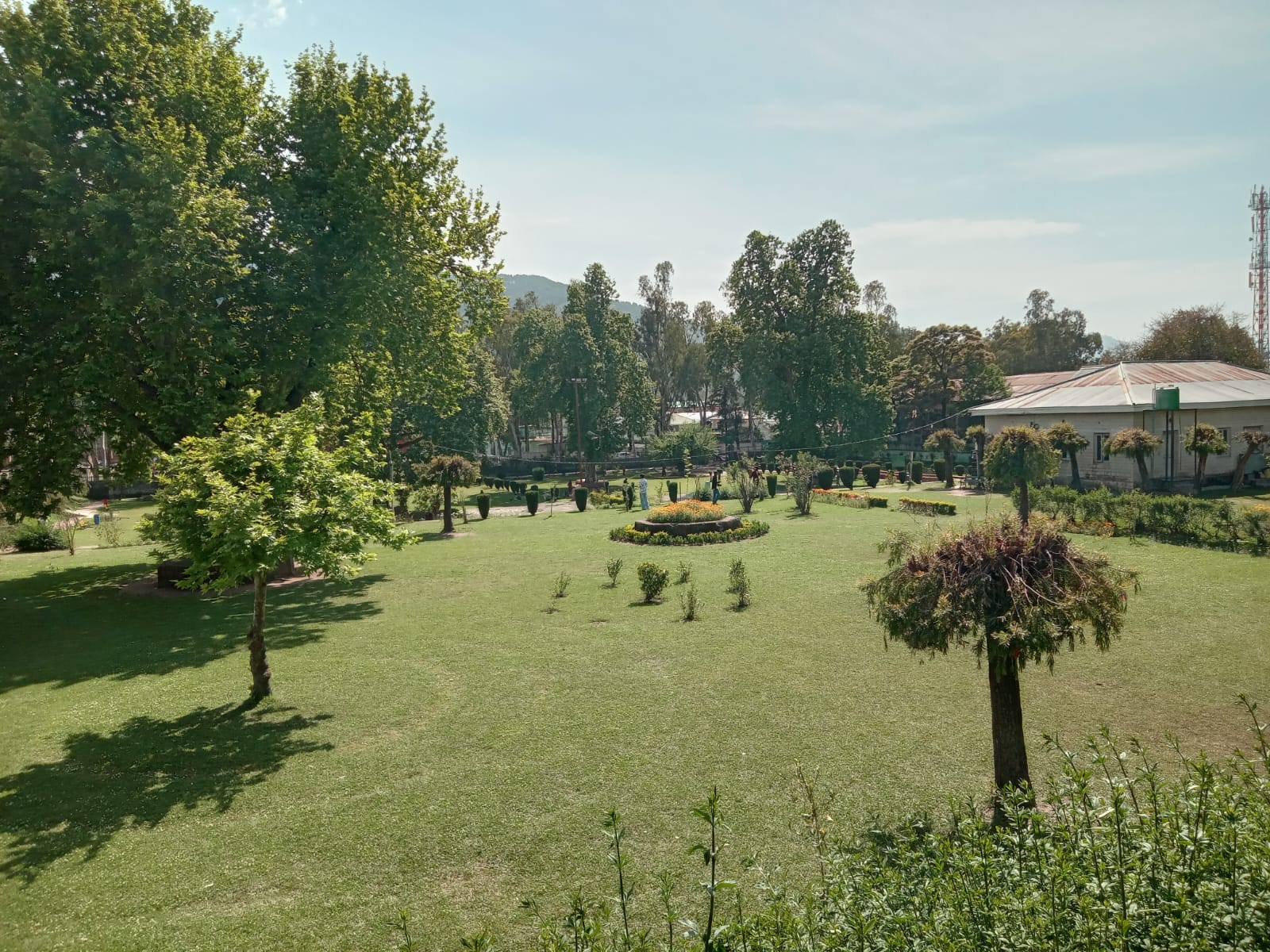
- Panorama Krishan Chander Park Poonch city
- Nickname: Mini Kashmir
- Location in Jammu and Kashmir, India Poonch (India)
- Coordinates: 33.7703°N 74.0925°E
- Country: India
- Union Territory: Jammu & Kashmir
- Division: Jammu
- District: Poonch
- Tehsil: Haveli

Government
  - Vidhan Sabha Constituency: Poonch–Haveli
  - MLA: Ajaz Jan (NC)
  - DDC: Tazeem Akhter, Independent

Area
  - Total: 10.36 km^{2} (4.00 sq mi)
- Elevation: 1,021 m (3,349 ft)

Population (2011)
  - Total: 26,854
  - Density: 2,592/km^{2} (6,713/sq mi)
- Demonym: Poonchi

Languages
  - Official: Hindi, Dogri, English, Kashmiri, Urdu
  - Spoken: Pahari, Gojri, Kashmiri
- Time zone: UTC+5:30 (IST)
- PIN: 185101
- Vehicle registration: JK-12
- Website: poonch.nic.in

Poonch (or Punch), (called Prunts in the Kashmiri, Gojri & Pahari languages) is a city and the administrative headquarters of the Poonch district, of the Indian-administered union territory of Jammu and Kashmir, which is part of the larger disputed territory of Kashmir. It is located near the Line of Control – the de facto border in the disputed region. Poonch shares a de facto border with the Poonch district of the Pakistan-administered, self-governing territory of Azad Kashmir.Poonch is also, often referred to as “Mini Kashmir” due to its landscape and climate.

== History ==
Based on the Mahābhārata mythology, and the evidence from the seventh-century Chinese traveller Xuanzang, the districts of Poonch along with Rajauri and Abhisara were under the sway of the Republican Kambojas during epic times.

Poonch has witnessed many historical eras. Around 326 BC when Alexander the Great invaded the lower Jhelum belt to fight with Porus, this region was known as Dravabhisar. In the sixth-century AD, the famous Chinese traveller Huien Tsang passed through this area. According to his observation, this region was known as part of Kashmir also known as mini Kashmir. Around 850 AD Poonch became a sovereign state ruled by Raja Nar, who was basically a horse trader. According to Rajatarangani, Raja Trilochanapala From Mangral Rajput Dynasty of the Poonch area gave a tough fight to Mahmood Ghaznvi, who invaded this area in 1020 A.D.

Poonch came under the Kashmir Sultanate during late 15th century through the military campaigns of Malik Tazi Bhat, a general of the Sultanate. He led military campaigns that resulted in the conquest and administration of several regions, including Poonch, Jammu, Rajouri, Bhimber, Jhelum, Sialkot, and Gujrat, from 1475 to 1487. Following its incorporation, Poonch was administered as a vassal state under the Kashmir Sultanate. Local rulers retained a degree of autonomy but were required to acknowledge the suzerainty of the Sultan and provide tribute and military support when necessary. This arrangement persisted until the late 16th century, when the region came under Mughal influence.

In 1596, the Mughal emperor Jahangir made Raja Siraj-Ud-Din Rathore, the descendant of Rao Jodha and Rao Suraj Singh, the new ruler of Poonch. Siraj-Ud-Din and his descendants Raja Shahbaz Khan Rathore, Raja Abdul Razak Rathore, Raja Rustam Rathore and Raja Bahadur Rathore ruled this area up to 1798 AD.

From 1819 to 1846, Poonch was a part of the Sikh Empire of Maharaja Ranjit Singh. Maharaja granted it as a jagir to Raja Dhian Singh, one of his nobles and a brother of Dogra Rajput Raja Gulab Singh of Jammu. In 1846 Poonch was part of the territories transferred to Gulab Singh, who became the Maharaja of Jammu and Kashmir under the suzerainty of the British Raj. However, Poonch remained a jagir under the descendants of Dhian Singh. In the 1930s, on the recommendation of the Glancy Commission, a 75-member Legislative Assembly had come into existence under the name of Praja Sabha. Two seats were allotted to the Poonch principality. In the 1940s, Maharaja Hari Singh started integrating it with Jammu and Kashmir, as a de facto district.

In 1947, after the Partition of India, a rebellion started in the western part of the Poonch district (in the Bagh and Sudhanoti tehsils) against the Maharaja's rule and demanding accession to the newly independent Pakistan. The rebels were armed and supported by Pakistan and they evicted the State Forces, who became ensconced in their garrison at the Poonch town. The town remained besieged for almost a year, until it was relieved by the Indian Army on 20 November 1948. The western part of the district remained under the control of the rebels, who joined Pakistan as the state of Azad Kashmir. The Line of Control between the two parts of the district runs to the west of the Poonch town.

=== Recent developments ===
During the 2019 India-Pakistan standoff, the Pakistan Air Force conducted an airstrike in Poonch as part of a larger operation in Indian-administered Kashmir. This standoff was the first time since 1971 that the Line of Control was violated by fighter aircraft.

After the 2025 Pahalgam terror attack, India blamed Pakistan-based militant groups and a diplomatic crisis ensued between the two countries. Pakistan resorted to shelling across the Line of Control on the border regions including the Poonch town, starting 24 April 2025. After the Indian missile strikes on Pakistani terror infrastructure on 7 May, extensive shelling followed, killing 13 people, including four children and a Sikh ragi. It also damaged a Sikh gurdwara, an Islamic school (madrasa) and dozens of houses.

Historical population
Year	Pop.	±%
1911	7,564	—
1921	7,026	−7.1%
1931	8,152	+16.0%
1941	8,608	+5.6%
1951	9,402	+9.2%
1961	10,196	+8.4%
1971	11,981	+17.5%
1981	14,171	+18.3%
2001	23,978	+69.2%
2011	26,854	+12.0%

== Geography ==
The town is at an elevation of 1,021 m (3,349 ft), on the bank of the Poonch River at its point of confluence with the Betar Nala. The Poonch river originates in the Pir Panjal range and flows west until the town of Poonch, after which it turns southwest. The Betar Nala originates northeast of the Poonch town, in the Pakistan-administered portion of the former district.

== Climate ==
Poonch has a humid subtropical climate (Köppen Cfa), which is much cooler than much of the rest of India due to its moderately high elevation and northerly position. Winters are cool, with January daytime temperatures averaging 2.5 °C (36.5 °F) and nighttime temperatures falling below freezing. Summers are short and generally pleasant, with temperatures rarely exceeding 31 °C. Winters are marked by rainfall due to western disturbances, and snowfall is quite common in January and February.

The Pir Panjal range of mountains separates the Poonch Valley from the Kashmir Valley. With the completion of the Mughal Road in 2010, via the Pir Panjal Pass, there is now a direct road link between the two areas.

== Demographics ==
As of 2011 India census, Poonch had a population of 26,854, of which 16,063 were male (60%), and 10,791 were female (40%). Poonch has an average literacy rate of 79%: male literacy is 84%, and female literacy is 77%. In Poonch, 13% of the population is under 6 years of age.

Hinduism is the largest religion in the Poonch town, followed by 44.19% of people. Islam is the second-largest religion with 33.49% adherents. Christianity and Sikhism form 1.28% and 20.79% of the population respectively.

Religion in Poonch Town (2011)
1. Hinduism (44.2%)
2. Islam (33.5%)
3. Sikhism (20.8%)
4. Christianity (1.28%)
5. Buddhism (0.03%)
6. Jainism (0.01%)
7. Others (0.00%)
8. No Religion (0.22%)

== Transportation ==
=== Road ===
A bus across the LoC, the Poonch-Rawalakot bus, has helped to re-establish ties across the border. The NH 144A starts from Jammu and ends at Poonch, thus connecting Poonch to the rest of Jammu Division and India beyond. The Mughal Road via the Pir Panjal Pass connects Poonch to the Kashmir Valley.

=== Rail ===
There is no rail connectivity to Poonch yet. Jammu–Poonch Railway Line is a proposed railway line from Jammu Tawi station via the Historic City of Akhnoor to Poonch. The nearest major railway station to Poonch is Jammu Tawi railway station, located at a distance of 236 kilometres and is a 6 hr drive. The nearest railway stations are Bijbehara railway station and Anantnag railway station, both located at a distance of 152 kilometres from Poonch Town.

=== Air ===
Poonch Airport is a small airstrip which was constructed during Indo-Pakistani War of 1947. The airport is currently non-operational. The nearest airport is Srinagar International Airport located at a distance of 177 kilometres and is a 5.5 hr drive.

== See also ==
- 1947 Poonch Rebellion
- Kallai, Poonch District
