= Pilgrimage places in India =

Religion and spirituality, a pilgrimage is a long journey or search of great moral significance. Sometimes, it is a journey to a sacred place or shrine of importance to a person's beliefs and faith. Members of every major religion participate in pilgrimages. A person who makes such a journey is called a pilgrim. One of the greatest pilgrimages of the recent times is for the Kumbh Mela 2025. One of the oldest and famous pilgrimage centres is Hemis, near Leh, for Mahayana Buddhism in the world.

== Hinduism ==
Most Hindus who can afford to go on such journeys travel to numerous iconic sites including those below:

- Ainavilli
- Allahabad
- Amararama
- Amarkantak
- Amarnath
- Anandashram, Kanhangad
- Annavaram
- Antarvedi
- Arasavalli
- Attukal
- Avittathur
- Ayodhya
- Baba Dhansar
- Badrinath
- Barsana
- Basistha Ashram
- Batu Caves
- Belur Math
- Bhadrachalam
- Bhattiprolu
- Bhavani
- Bhimashankar Temple
- Biccavolu
- Vrindavan
- Chebrolu, Guntur district
- Chennai
- Chitrakuta
- Chidambaram
- Dakor
- Dharmasthala
- Draksharama
- Dwaraka Pītha
- Dwarka
- Dwaraka Tirumala
- Gajanan Maharaj
- Gangotri
- Gaya, India
- Ghatikachala
- Godachi Veerbhadhreshwar Temple
- Gor Khuttree
- Gosaikunda
- Govardhana matha
- Govindavadi
- Guruvayur
- Hajo
- Haridwar
- Hemkund
- Hornad, Annapurnadevi Temple
- Idagunji
- Jonnawada
- Jyotirlinga
- Jyotirmath
- Kabir Dharm Nagar Damakheda
- Kalaram Temple
- Kaleshwaram
- Kalighat Temple, Kolkata
- Kancheepuram, Tamil Nadu
- Karanja Datta Mandir
- Kataragama
- Kateel
- Katra
- Kedarnath
- Kodlamane Shree Vishnumurthy Temple, Karnataka
- Kolhapur
- Kollur
- Konark
- Kotappakonda
- Ksheerarama
- kuchanpally
- Kukke Subramanya Temple
- Kumararama
- Kumbakonam
- Kumbh Mela
- Kurukshetra
- Kurupuram
- Madurai Meenakshi Temple
- Kullu
- Maihar Devi
- Mahur, Renuka Devi
- Mehandipur Balaji, Rajasthan
- Mandher Devi temple in Mandhradevi
- Manikaran
- Mayapur
- Mantralayam, Raghavendr Swamy Temple
- Mount Abu
- Mount Kailash
- Mukhalingam
- Narasimha Konda
- Narayanalayam
- Narmada River
- Nashik
- Nellitheertha
- Omkareshwar
- Palani
- Pancharama Kshetras
- Panchavati
- Pandharpur
- Parshuram Kund
- Pithapuram
- Puri
- Pushkar
- Puttaparthi Sri Sathya Saibaba
- Ramatheertham
- Rameswaram
- Rishikesh
- Ryali
- Sabarimala Swamisaranam
- Salasar Balaji, churu Rajasthan
- Sangam, Srikakulam district
- Saptashrangi
- Shirdi
- Shivkhori
- Shri Kali Temple, Sanganeri Gate, Jaipur (Rajasthan)
- Shri Mahadev Mandir
- Simhachalam
- Sivagiri, Kerala
- Somarama
- Sree Padmanabhaswamy Temple, Thiruvananthapuram
- Sri Kurmam
- Sringeri Sharada Peetham
- Srirangam
- Srisailam
- Talapady
- Thanjavur
- Thiruchendur
- Thirumanthamkunnu Temple
- Thrissur
- Tirtha and Kshetra
- Tirupati
- Trimbakeshwar Shiva Temple
- Tripuranthakam
- Tuljapur Bhavani temple
- Udupi
- Ujjain
- Undavalli, Undavalli Caves
- Vaishno Devi
- Vani (Nashik)
- Varanasi
- Vijayawada, Kanaka Durga Temple
- Vindhyachal
- Vithoba
- Vrindavan
- Yamunotri
- Yadagirigutta

These Hindu pilgrimage sites can be divided into dhams, kumbhs, jyotirlingas, devi sites etc. Every category has got its own significance. It is believed that visiting char dhams help one to attain salvation. There are four dhams and twelve jyotirlings along with 51 shakti Peeths in India.

== Islam ==
- Rauzaa of Shah-e-Alam, Ahmedabad, Gujarat
- Furfura Sharif, Hooghly, West Bengal
- Hazratbal Shrine, Srinagar
- Ajmer Sharif Dargah - the dargah of Moinuddin Chishti, Ajmer
- Haji Ali Dargah, Mumbai
- Bibi Ka Maqbara, Aurangabad
- Rauza Sharif - the rauza of Sheikh Ahmad Sirhindi, in Sirhind-Fategarh, Punjab State
- Dargah of Khawaja Kanoon Sahib, Madhya Pradesh
- Mazar-e-Najmi, Ujjain, Madhya Pradesh
- Buddishai Baba Dargah in Telangana
- Cheraman Perumal Juma Masjid, Kerala
- Dargah of Nizamuddin Chishti, Delhi
- Valley of Saints at Khuldabad
- Thiruparankundram Dargah in Thiruparankundram, Tamil Nadu
- Dargah-e-Ala Hazrat - Dargah of Imam Ahmed Raza Khan Barelvi, in Bareilly, Uttar Pradesh

In addition to being places of ziyarat, dargahs and rauzas have often served as places for Islamic education and the training of new ulema, as centres of Sufi turuq. For example, many Sunni ulema educated in the Chishti Order were educated in Delhi, where the tomb of Nizamuddin Auliya is and where his students are well established. Movements within the ulema, such as the Deobandi or Barelvi movements, are so named because they are associated with particularly influential seminaries and madrassahs (like the Darul Uloom Deoband in Deoband, or the Urs-e-Razavi in Bareilly, the latter of which is so named because it is located at the rauza of Imam Ahmad Raza Khan).

During the Mughal era, Surat was a common port for Muslims across North and West India to depart for the Hajj.

== Buddhism ==
- Amaravati Stupa and Dharanikota
- Bavikonda:
- Bhattiprolu:
- Bodh Gaya: the place of his Enlightenment (in the current Mahabodhi Temple).
- Chandavaram, Chandavaram Buddhist site:
- Gudivada
- Guntupalle, Guntupalli Group of Buddhist Monuments:
- Hemis
- Jaggayyapeta:
- Kusinara: (now Kusinagar, India) where he died.
- Nagarjuna Konda:
- Nelakondapalli
- Rajgir: Place of the subduing of Nalagiri, the angry elephant, through friendliness. Rajgir was another major city of ancient India. It has strong connection with buddhism.
- Salihundam
- Sankasia: Place of the descending to earth from Tusita heaven (after a stay of 3 months teaching his mother the Abhidhamma).
- Sarnath: (formally Isipathana) where he delivered his first teaching.
- Sravasti: Place of the Twin Miracle, showing his supernatural abilities in performance of miracles. Sravasti is also the place where Buddha spent the largest amount of time, being a major city in ancient India.
- Vaishali: Place of receiving an offering of honey from a monkey. Vaishali was the capital of the Vajjian Republic of ancient India.

Some other pilgrimage places in India and Nepal connected to the life of Gautama Buddha are: Pataliputta, Nalanda, Vikramshila, Gaya, Kapilavastu, Kosambi, Sanchi, Varanasi, Kesariya, Devadaha, Pava and Mathura, Uttar Pradesh, Dhauli Stupa, near Puri, Odisha, etc.

There are many places scattered across mainland India, where one can find the relics of ancient Mauryan and the Gupta Empire, who championed and help propagate the Buddhist faith across most of India, South East and far East Asian countries.

== Jainism ==
- North India: Hastinapur, Taxila, and Ashtapada
- South India: Shravanabelagola, Moodabidri, Humbaj, Anantnath Swami Temple near Kalpetta
- Eastern India: Shikharji, Pawapuri, Champa, Pundravardhan
- Western India: Palitana, Girnar, Mount Abu, Mahavirji, Shankheshwar, Mahudi
- Central India: Vidisha, Kundalpur, Sonagir

== Zoroastrianism ==
The Zoroastrians take pilgrimage trips in India to the eight Atash Behrams in India and one in Yazd.

== Christianity ==
- Goa. St. Francis Xavier
- St. Thomas Mount. Place where St. Thomas was martyred, Chennai, Tamil Nadu, India.
- St. Thomas Syro-Malabar Church, Malayattoor is one of the eight international shrines in the world, situated in Malayattoor Angamaly, Ernakulam district of Kerala, India.
- Basilica of Our Lady of Good Health, Velankanni. 16th-century Marian apparition site, Velankanni, Tamil Nadu, India.
- St. Andrew's Basilica Arthunkal, Alleppey/Alappuzha, Kerala.
- St. Thomas Church, Thumpoly (Thumpoly Church) Alleppey/Alappuzha, kerala.
- Our Lady of Assumption Church, Poomkavu Alleppey/Alappuzha, kerala.
- Thodupuzha. Divine Mercy Shrine of Holy Mary - Marian apparition site.
- Shrine of the Infant Jesus, Nashik, Maharashtra.
- St. Jude Shrine, Jhansi
- Mount Mary Church, Bandra, Mumbai, Maharashtra
- St Peter's and St Paul's Orthodox church (Parumala church), Parumala, Kerala.
- St George Orthodox church, Puthupally.
- Kattachira St Mary's Orthodox Church.
- Niranam St Mary's Orthodox church.
- St. Mary's Syro-Malabar Catholic Church, Bharananganam, tomb of Saint Alphonsa, the first woman of Indian origin to be canonised as a saint by the Catholic Church, and the first canonised saint of the Syro-Malabar Church
- St. Joseph's Pilgrim Church, Peringuzha, Muvattupuzha, Kerala
- Santa Cruz Cathedral Basilica Fort Kochi
- Holy Cross Church, Mattanchery, Kochi
- St Antony's Forane Church & St Joseph's Miraculous Shrine, Kannamaly Kochi.
- Our Lady Of Velankanni Church, Maruvakad, Chellanam.Kochi
- St Antony's Church, Arookuty, Paduvapuram.
- St Lawrence Church, Edacochin
- St Mary's Forane Church, Thankey
