= 2024 Reasi attack =

Terrorist attack in Jammu and Kashmir, India

- Part of the Insurgency in Jammu and Kashmir
- Location: Reasi, Jammu & Kashmir, India
- Date: 9 June 2024
- Target: Hindu pilgrims
- Attack type: Mass shooting
- Weapon: M4 carbines
- Deaths: 9
- Injuries: 41
- Perpetrators: Lashkar-e-Taiba (Claimed by Jammu and Kashmir Police); The Resistance Front (Initial claim)
- Motive: Kashmiri Separatism

The 2024 Reasi attack was a terrorist attack that occurred on 9 June 2024 in the Reasi district of the Jammu division of Jammu and Kashmir, India. Several unidentified Islamist terrorists opened fire on a passenger bus transporting Hindu pilgrims from the Shiv Khori cave to Katra, causing it to lose control and plummet into a deep gorge, followed by further firing at the crashed bus by the gunmen. Nine people were killed in the attack, and an additional 41 were injured.

The Resistance Front (TRF) initially claimed responsibility for the ambush but later denied involvement, while the Jammu and Kashmir Police believes that the ambush was carried out by the Lashkar-e-Taiba, of which the TRF is considered an offshoot.

== Background ==
The Jammu and Kashmir region, which both India and Pakistan claim fully but only exert partial administration, has been the pinpoint of a decades-long conflict between the two states. They have fought two wars over the territory since 1947. Since 1989, the conflict has devolved into an armed resistance against Indian control. India has claimed Pakistan of backing and harbouring the terrorists, which it denies.

Eight civilians were killed in the territory in the first five months of 2024. Terrorist attacks in the Poonch and Rajouri districts of Jammu division have risen over the past four years, with mainly security forces being targeted.

== Attack ==
At approximately 6:15 p.m. on 9 June 2024, terrorists armed with firearms ambushed a 53-seater Yatri passenger bus carrying Hindu pilgrims in Teryath village, firing between 25 and 30 gunshots indiscriminately. The driver was struck by gunfire, causing them to lose control and plunge into a gorge. Even after the bus crashed into the gorge, the firing continued. Nine people, including a two-year-old and a 14-year-old, were killed and 41 were injured. The victims were from Jammu and Kashmir, Uttar Pradesh and Rajasthan. At least ten victims had gunshot wounds, and empty cartridges were recovered at the scene. The ambush happened about an hour before Narendra Modi took the oath as Prime Minister.

== Responsibility ==
Three foreign militants and one suspected local, who acted as a lookout, partook in the ambush. The gunmen reportedly used American-made M4 carbine assault rifles, similar to the weapons leftover after the American withdrawal from Afghanistan. The Resistance Front (TRF), an offshoot of Lashkar-e-Taiba, initially claimed responsibility for the ambush but later denied involvement. People's Anti-Fascist Front and Revival of Resistance, both offshoots of JeM, also denied involvement. The Jammu and Kashmir Police stated that it believed the Lashkar-e-Taiba was responsible. The actual perpetrators are yet to be determined by the Indian investigators. Fifty people were detained in relation to the ambush by the Reasi district police. A local of Rajouri district was arrested on 19 June over allegations of sheltering the militants and acting as their guide.

== Aftermath ==
A search and rescue operation was conducted following the ambush, during which security personnel and a military helicopter were dispatched. Survivors were treated at nearby hospitals. Lieutenant Governor of Jammu and Kashmir Manoj Sinha announced a compensation of one million (10 Lakhs) Indian rupees for the dead and 50,000 rupees for the injured.

The Jammu and Kashmir Police, Indian Army, and Central Reserve Police Force launched a manhunt for the militants. The search was concentrated around the Teryath-Poni-Shiv Khori area, and included unmanned aerial vehicles (UAVs), detection dogs, and village defence committees. At least two of the militants are reportedly hiding in the upper region of Reasi, which is forested and could hamper search attempts. The investigation of the ambush was transferred to the National Investigation Agency by the Ministry of Home Affairs on 17 June.

=== Further attacks and incidents ===
A series of fresh militant attacks has been taking place since December 2023, when militants killed four Indian soldiers. Several armed encounters happened in the Jammu Division within days of the attack in Reasi. On 11 June, one civilian was shot at by a terrorist in Kathua's Hira Nagar area, and a second encounter took place in Doda's Chattergala area, in which seven security forces' personnel were wounded. A search operation was launched by security forces in Kathua, during which a gunfight broke out between them and militants, resulting in the deaths of a CRPF soldier and both of the militants. Several Pakistan-made items were found in the possession of the two militants, including ₹500 notes worth ₹1 lakh. They also possessed Pakistan-made chocolates, dry channa, stale chapatis, medicines, painkiller injections, two packs of A4 battery cells, and one handset with an antenna and two wires hanging from it. According to the police in Kathua, the militants had one M4 carbine and one AK-47 rifle. Another encounter ensued on 12 June in Doda's Gandoh area, in which one policeman was injured.

On 6 July, six militants were killed by security forces in twin gunfights in Kulgam district. Two soldiers lost their lives during the separate encounters.

On 8 July, five Indian Army personnel, including a junior commissioned officer were shot dead, and as many were injured when militants ambushed an Army convoy on a rugged mountainous road in Kathua district.

The Indian Army foiled an infiltration bid on July 14 along the Line of Control (LoC) in Kupwara district and killed three militants.

On 15 June 2024, a gunfight broke during a search and cordon operation wherein four Army personnel including a cop (Captain Brijesh Thapa, Naik D Rajesh, Sepoy Bijendra and Sepoy Ajay Naruka) were gunned down in action in the Doda district, about 55 km away from the Doda town. The attack was claimed by 'Kashmir Tigers', a shadow group of Pakistan-backed militant group JeM. According to the Army's 16 Corps, also known as White Knight Corps, contact with militants was established at about 9 pm when a heavy gunfight occurred.

== Reactions ==
=== Local ===
Prime Minister Narendra Modi reviewed the situation after the attack, while Lieutenant Governor of Jammu and Kashmir Manoj Sinha stated that Modi has told him to monitor the situation. President Droupadi Murmu said that she was anguished by the attack, and Union Minister Amit Shah vowed that the perpetrators would face "the wrath of the law". Minister of State for Social Justice and Empowerment Ramdas Athawale vowed to go to war with Pakistan if such attacks persisted.

Congress leader Rahul Gandhi called the attack cowardly and said that he was deeply saddened by it. Opposition leader Mallikarjun Kharge condemned it, and said that "[Modi's] chest-thumping propaganda of bringing peace and normalcy ... rings hollow".

Several political organizations condemned the attack, including All Parties Hurriyat Conference and Communist Party of India (Marxist). A number of Muslim parties also joined in condemning it. The Indian Youth Congress held a candle march for the victims, while several anti-Pakistan protests broke out across the Jammu division.

=== Media ===
Several Indian celebrities condemned or voiced condolences over the attack, including Alia Bhatt, Priyanka Chopra, Kangana Ranaut, Rashmika Mandanna, Kajal Aggarwal, Samantha Ruth Prabhu, Ajay Devgn, Varun Dhawan, Ayushmann Khurrana, Rajkummar Rao, Preity Zinta, Rakul Preet Singh, Raai Laxmi, Esha Gupta, Bipasha Basu, Atlee, Varun Tej, Riteish Deshmukh, Sudhanshu Pandey, Urfi Javed, Anupam Kher, Soni Razdan, Kapil Sharma, Hina Khan, and Aly Goni.

=== Pakistani reaction ===
Pakistani cricketer Hasan Ali and his wife Samiya condemned the militant ambush, by posting a story on Instagram with an AI-generated image, with added text saying "All Eyes on Vaishno Devi Attack". The post went viral and social media reactions to Ali's post were mixed, winning loads of praises from Indians and receiving negative reactions from Pakistanis. Ali responded to the reactions by posting a second story on his Instagram, maintaining his stance, and stating that he always stands for peace.

=== International ===
Geert Wilders, Leader of the largest party in the Netherlands, slammed Pakistan for sheltering terrorists and stated, "Don’t allow Pakistani terrorists in the Kashmir Valley killing Hindus. Protect your people India!"

(France) French Ambassador to India, Thierry Mathou expressed deepest condolences to the families of the victims and wished the injured a speedy recovery, stating, "We stand in full solidarity with India."

== Subsequent developments ==
On March 16, 2025, Abu Qatal, a senior Lashkar-e-Taiba (LeT) operative and mastermind behind the Reasi attack, was shot dead by unidentified assailants in Pakistan's Jhelum district. Qatal had a long history of orchestrating terror attacks in Jammu and Kashmir. Notably, he was implicated in the January 2023 Dhangri village attack in Rajouri, which resulted in seven civilian deaths, including two children. The National Investigation Agency (NIA) had charge-sheeted him for his involvement in this incident. Beyond direct attacks, Qatal played a pivotal role in establishing proxy terror outfits like the People's Anti-Fascist Force (PAFF) and The Resistance Force (TRF). These groups served to obscure the activities of established organizations such as LeT and Jaish-e-Mohammed.

== See also ==
- 2017 Amarnath Yatra attack
- 2023 Rajouri attacks
- 2025 Pahalgam attack
- List of terrorist incidents in India
