= Siar Baba Waterfall =

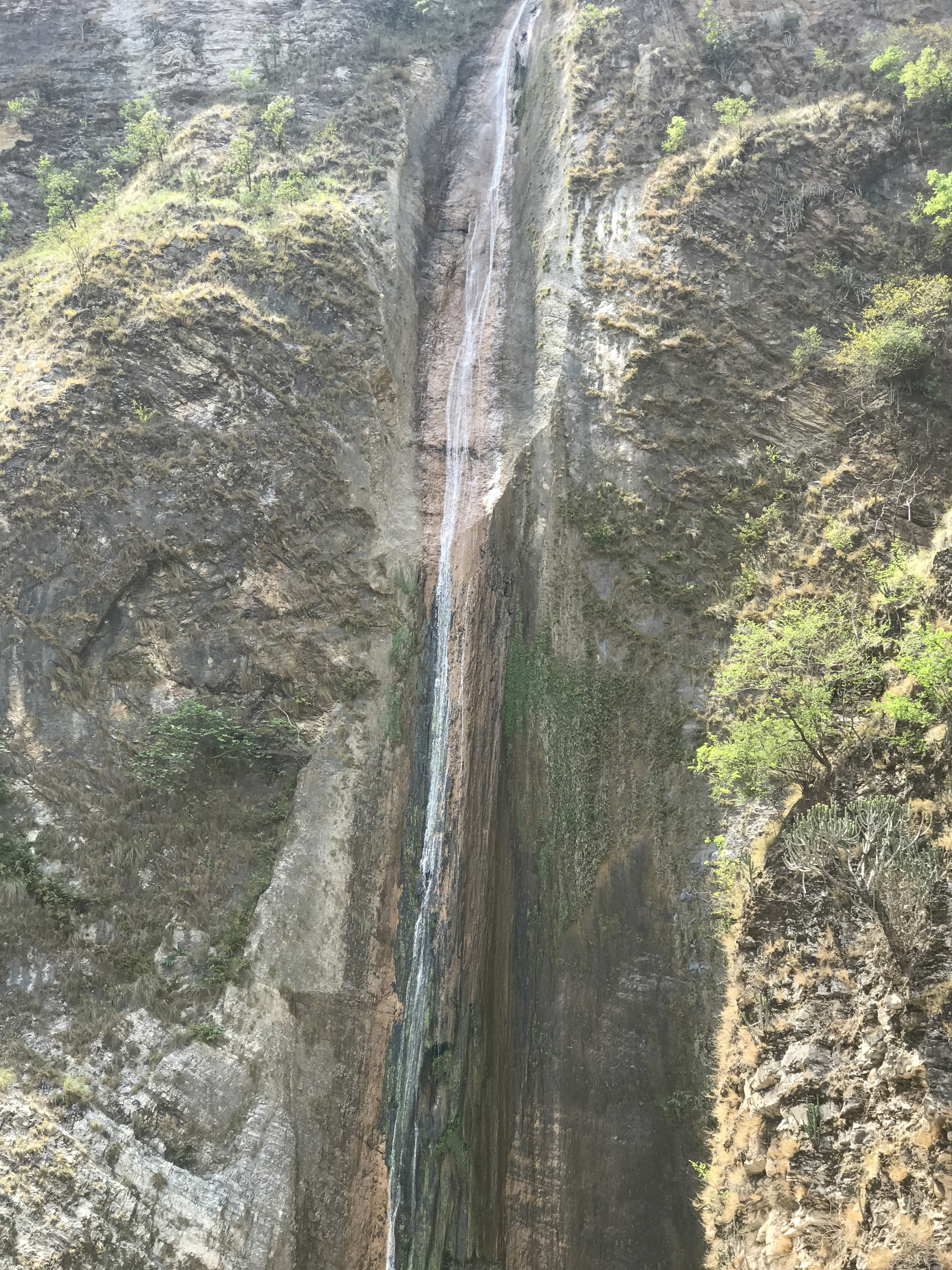
- Interactive map of Siar Baba Waterfall
- Location: Reasi, Jammu and Kashmir
- Coordinates: 33.14°N 74.55°E
- Elevation: 1,528.87 ft (466.00 m)
- Total height: 100 ft (30 m)

Siar Baba Waterfall is a waterfall near the Siar Baba temple, situated on the Chenab River in Kotla village of Reasi district, Jammu and Kashmir which comes under the region of Jammu division. The Siar Baba Waterfall is around 52.8 kilometres (32.8 mi) away from Reasi town towards south via NH144, 109 kilometres (68 mi) from Jammu Airport towards south via NH144, and 106 kilometres (66 mi) from Tawi River by crossing the Katra and Vaishno Devi. The waterfall descends from over 30.48 metres (100.0 ft).

Siar Baba Waterfall

Its distance from Reasi town is 11 km.
