= Indian temple tokens =

Token coins popular at temple sites in India

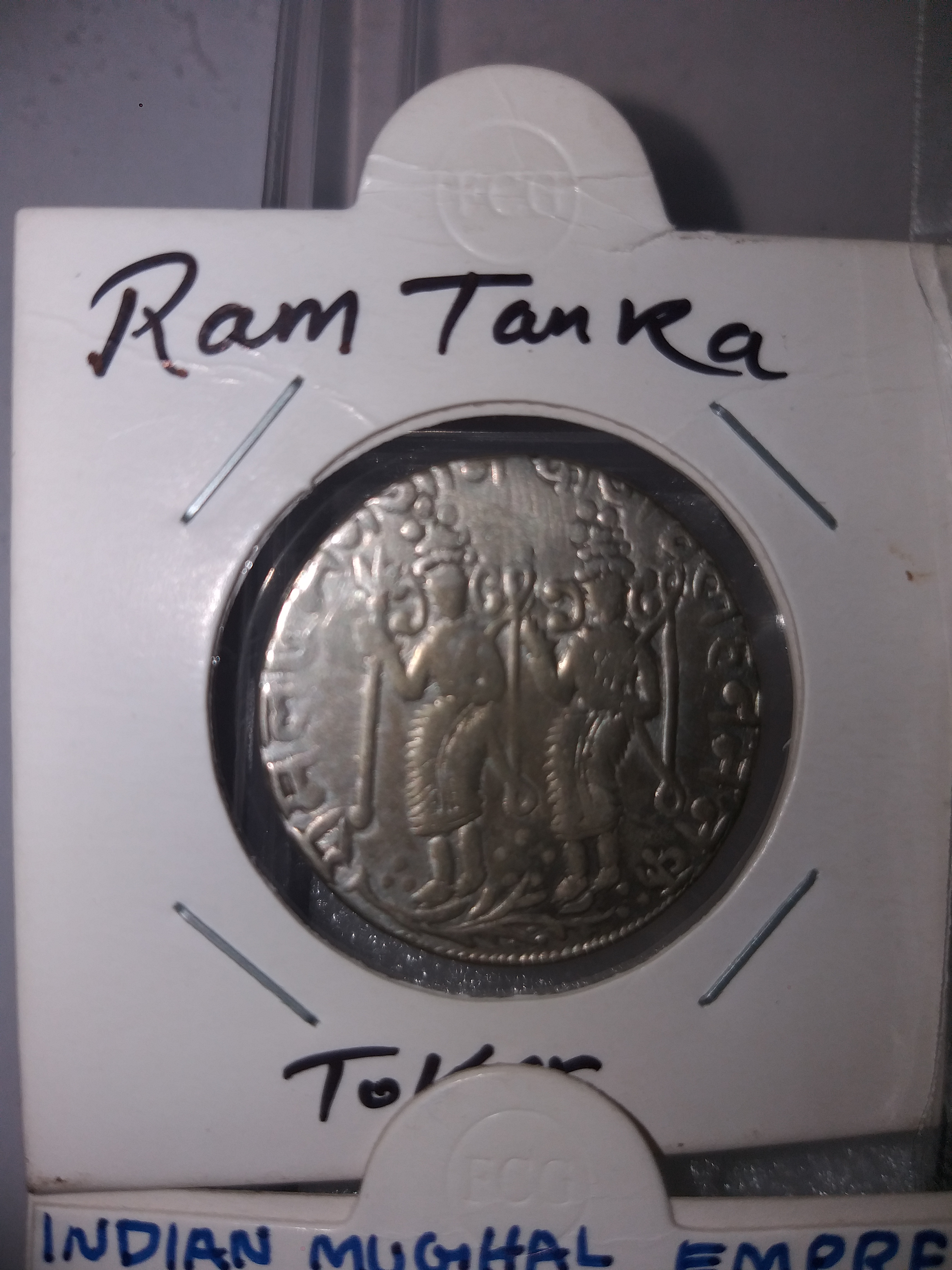
Obverse of a Rama Tanka from Bengal

The Indian Temple tokens are token coins popular at temple and pilgrimage sites in India. They are also known as Rama-tankas (lit. 'Coins of Rama'), as several of them feature the Hindu deity Rama. Other names for these coins include ram-tenki, ram-tanka, and ram-darbar.

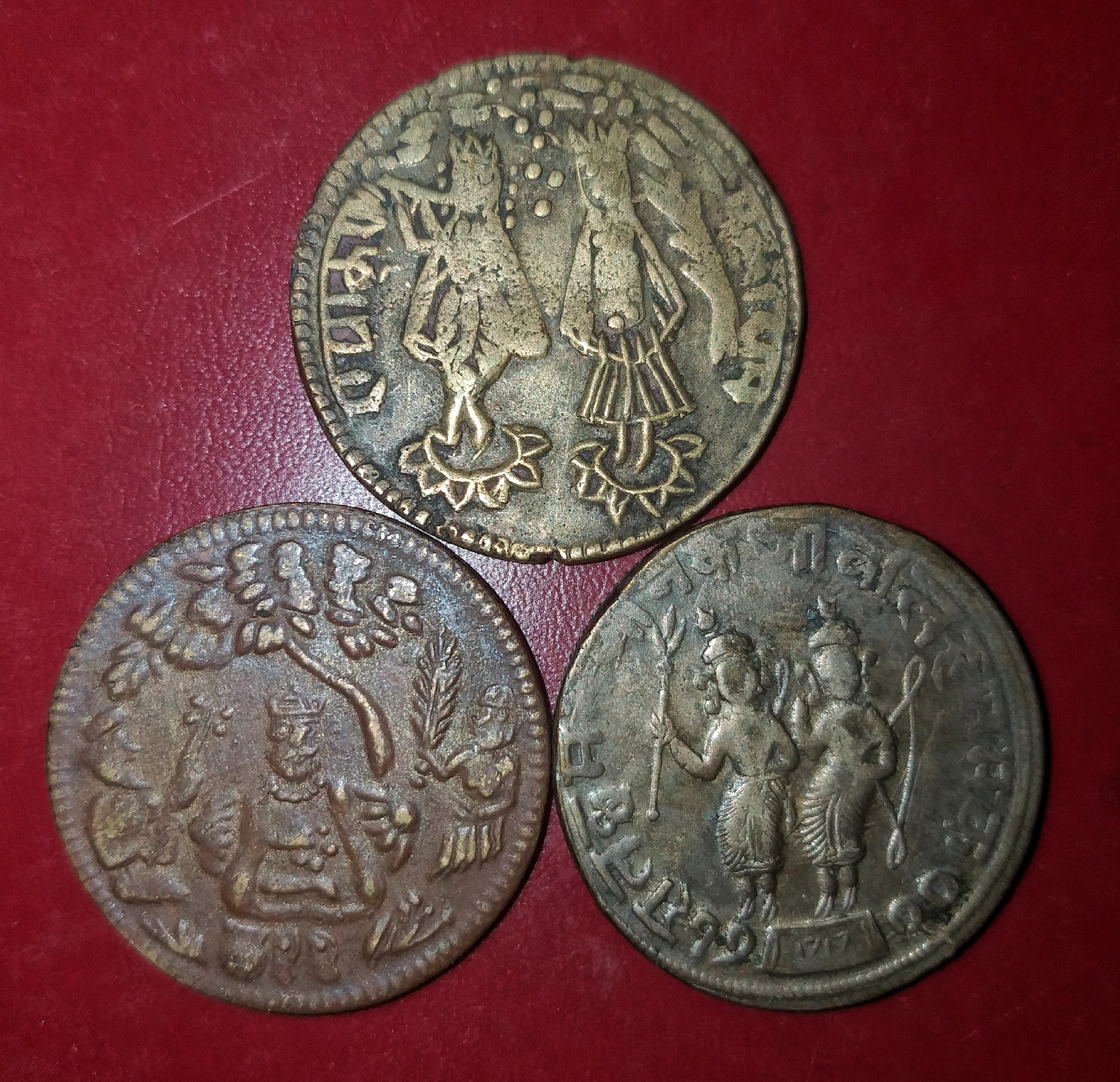
Three temple tokens from 19th century India, on top: Radha Krishna, in left: Sat Kartar, and in right: Rama and Lakshmana.

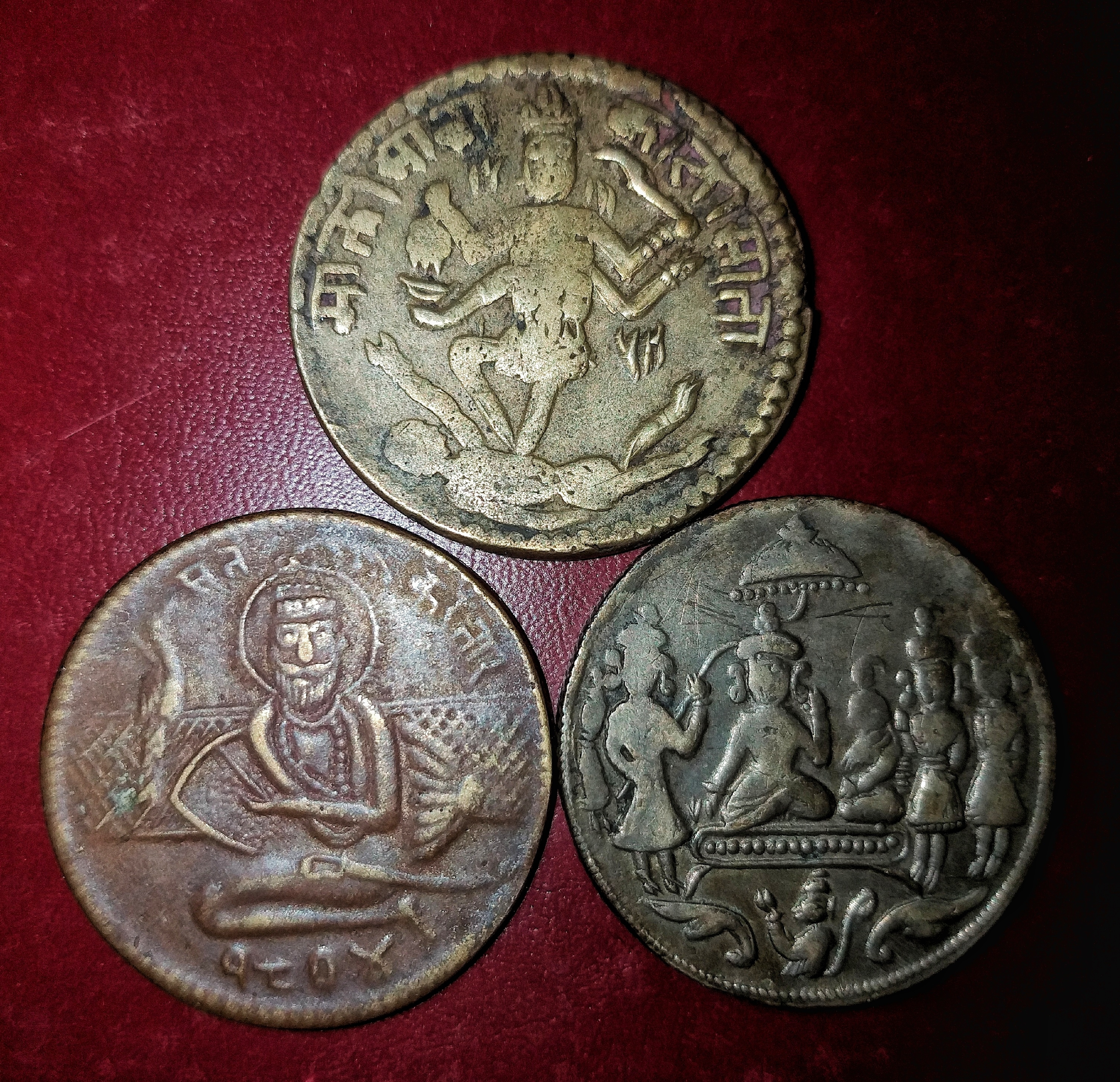
Three temple tokens from 19th century India, on top: Kalimata, in left: Sat Kartar, and in right: Ram Darbar.

== History ==
The earliest of the Rama-tankas may have been actual coins (not token coins or medals). The coins issued by the 12th century Chahamana king Vigraharaja IV can be considered as a precursor of the later Ramatankas. The earliest extant mention of the Rama-tankas can be found in the Dravya-Pariksha (1318) of Thakkar Pheru, a mint-master of the Delhi Sultanate. Pheru describes the gold coins known as Sita-Rami.

Historically, the coins appear to have been used for exchange. For example, a record from the Vijayanagara Empire mentions that "10,080 Rama-tanki varahas, 2000 Lakshmi-pati varahas, and 10,050 Puttalikas" were spent on the foundation of a new village called Kunidi. Thakkar Pheru also suggests that the rama-tankas were used for exchange, when he states that if a Sita-Rami coin is "ten mashas in weight and ten ban gold, it is worth being kept for worship and not to be exchanged."

== Common styles ==
A series of gold Rama-tankas, originating in the Vijayanagara Empire, feature the scene of Rama's coronation. These coins are now used as objects of worship in the modern Indian homes.

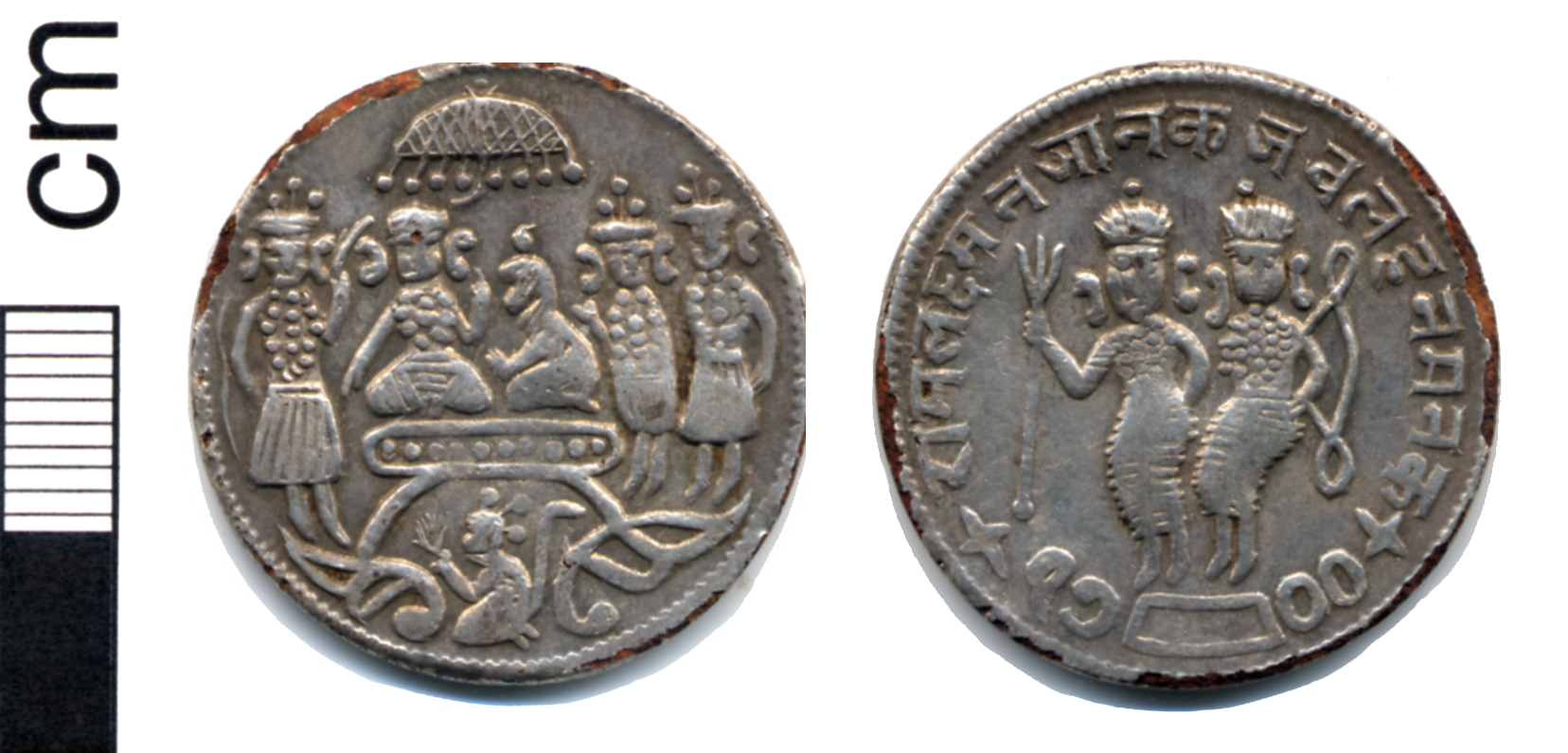
A silvered copper-alloy Rama-tanka depicting Rama's coronation on one side, and Rama-Lakshmana on the other side

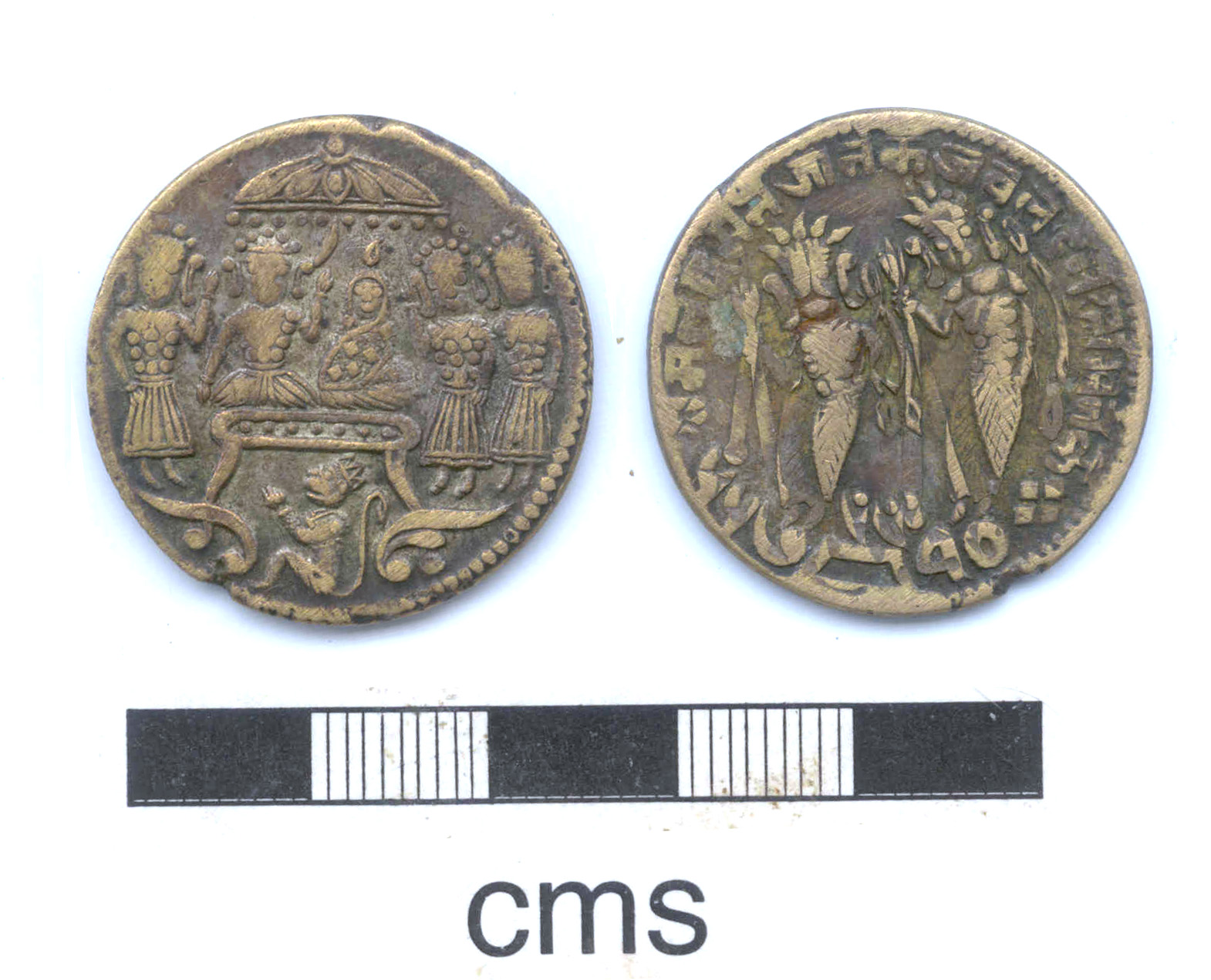
A silvered copper-alloy variant depicting Rama's coronation on one side, and Rama-Lakshmana on the other side

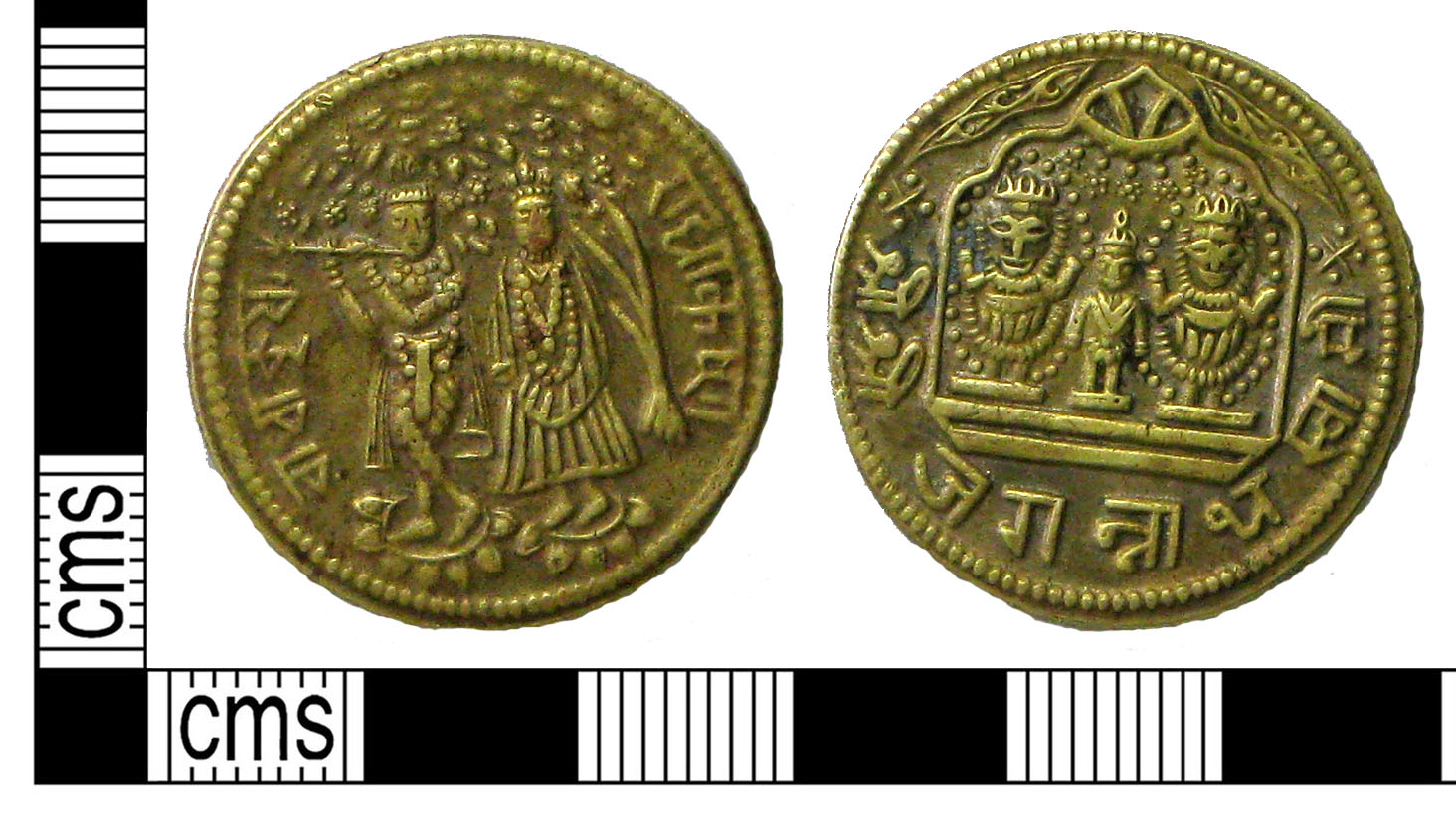
A temple token depicting the Jagannath triad on one side, and Krishna-Radha on the other side

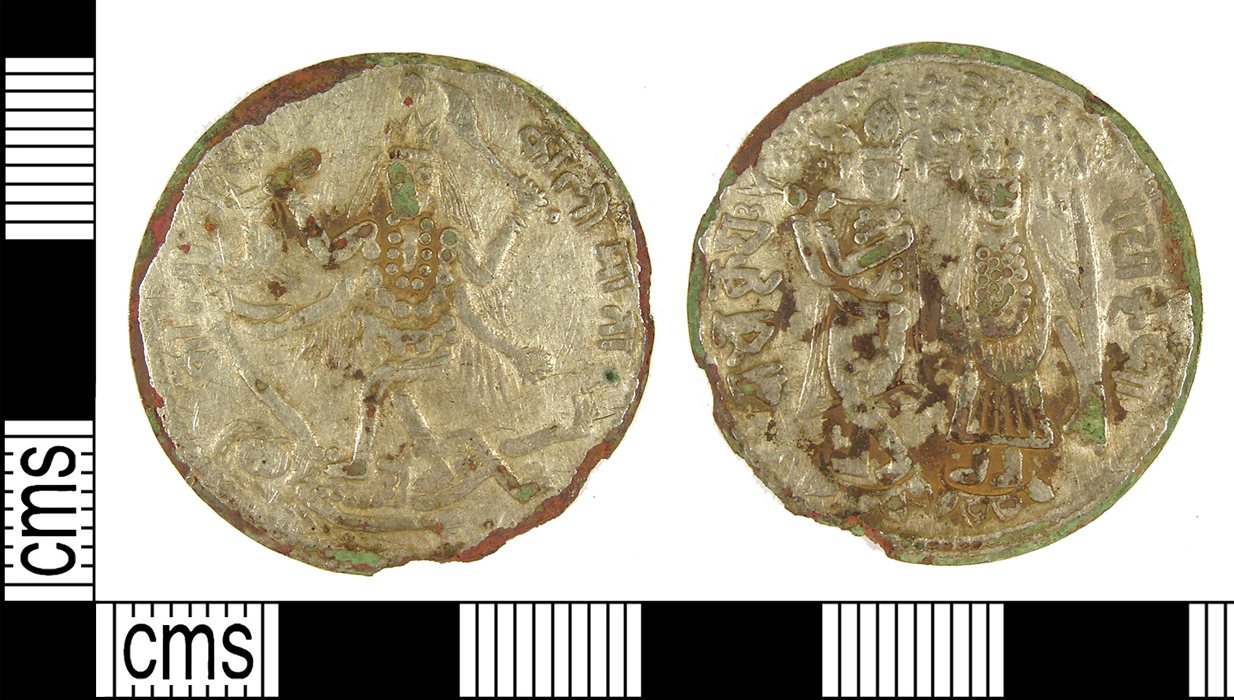
A silver coin depicting Kali on the obverse, and Krishna-Radha on the reverse

A popular silver token, found at Ayodhya and other pilgrimage centres of north India, features images of Rama and Lakshmana with a legend on the obverse, and depicts Rama's coronation on the reverse side. On the obverse, Rama and Lakshmana are depicted wearing a dhoti, both wearing crowns, and holding a bow on their left arms. Rama is shown with a trident in his right hand. The legend surrounding them reads Rāma Lachamana Jānaka java(ya)ta Hanamānaka ("Victorious are Rama, Lakshmana, Sita, and Hanuman"). The tokens also bear a date that reads 17 śana 40, which probably means Vikrama Samvat year 1740, that is, 1683 CE. On the reverse, Rama and Sita are shown on a throne, under a chhatra. They are flanked by Lakshmana on right, Bharata and Shatrughna at the left, and Hanuman at bottom. A variant of this token shows tridents in the right hands of both Rama and Lakshmana, and bears the date 517-40, which may refer to the year 51740 of a fictitious calendar era.

The Rama-tankas are generally associated with Rama, but similar temple tokens featuring other deities also exist. For example, a silver token that probably originated at the Jagannath Temple in Puri, features the triad worshipped at the temple. The obverse depicts the triad (Jaganatha, Subhadra, and Balarama) standing, with the Sanskrit legend śrī-śrī-Jagannāthasvatrayi ("the Jagannatha triad") in Devanagari script. The reverse features Rama's coronation scene; variants with the 517-40 date also exist.

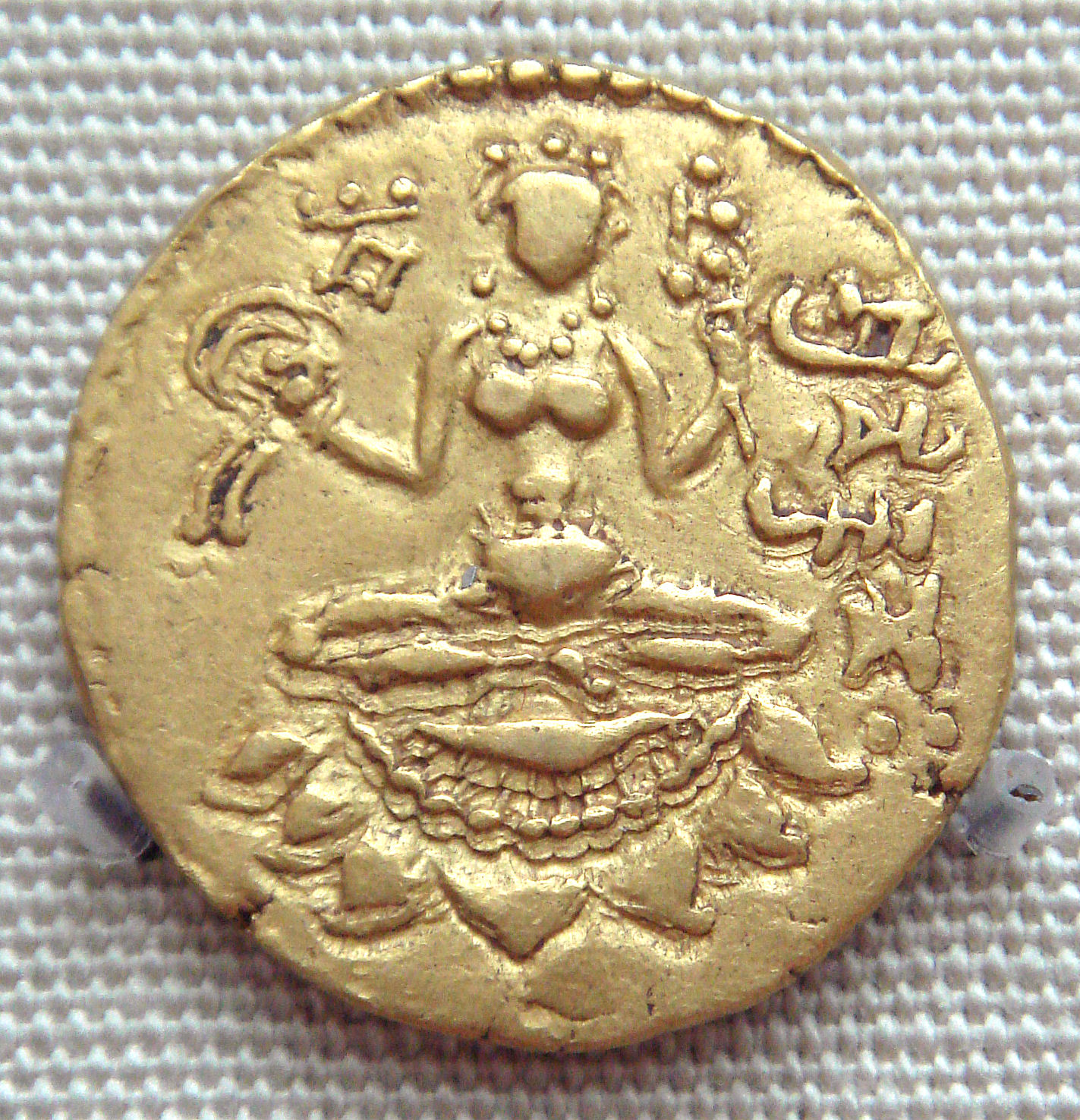
Depiction of Lakshmi on a coin of Chandragupta II. A silver temple token appears to be a 19th century adaptation of this coin.

Temple tokens not featuring Rama at all also exist. For example:

- A brass token from the Bengal region features the goddess Kali on one side, and Radha and Krishna on the other side. The obverse features the four-armed Kali standing on the chest of Shiva, and wearing a necklace of skulls. The legend Kali-mata ("Mother Kali") occurs in both Bengali and Devanagari scripts. The reverse depicts Krishna playing flute, with Radha to his left; both stand on a lotus, under a kadamba tree. The legend Rādhā-Kṛṣṇa occurs in both Bengali and Devanagari scripts.
- A silver token depicts Krishna and Radha in a dana-lila scene (in which Krishna asks gopis for tribute to let them pass) on the obverse, with a legend around it. The reverse features depicts Krishna as a cowherd driving four heads of cattle by a kadamba tree, with a legend all around.
- A brass token features Hanuman flying with a mountain (depicted as a triangular object) in his right hand, and a gada (mace) in his left hand, on the obverse. The reverse features a magic square of 9 numbers; the sum of each row and column is 15.
- A silver token features a cow on the obverse, with the Devanagari legend 152100 (probably the year of an imaginary calendar era, to present the coin as an ancient one). The reverse features a four-armed Lakshmi, sitting cross-legged on a lotus. This depiction of Lakshmi appears to be a 19th-century adaption of the one featured on the coins of Chandragupta II.
