= Reasi =

Reasi Rasyal
- Town
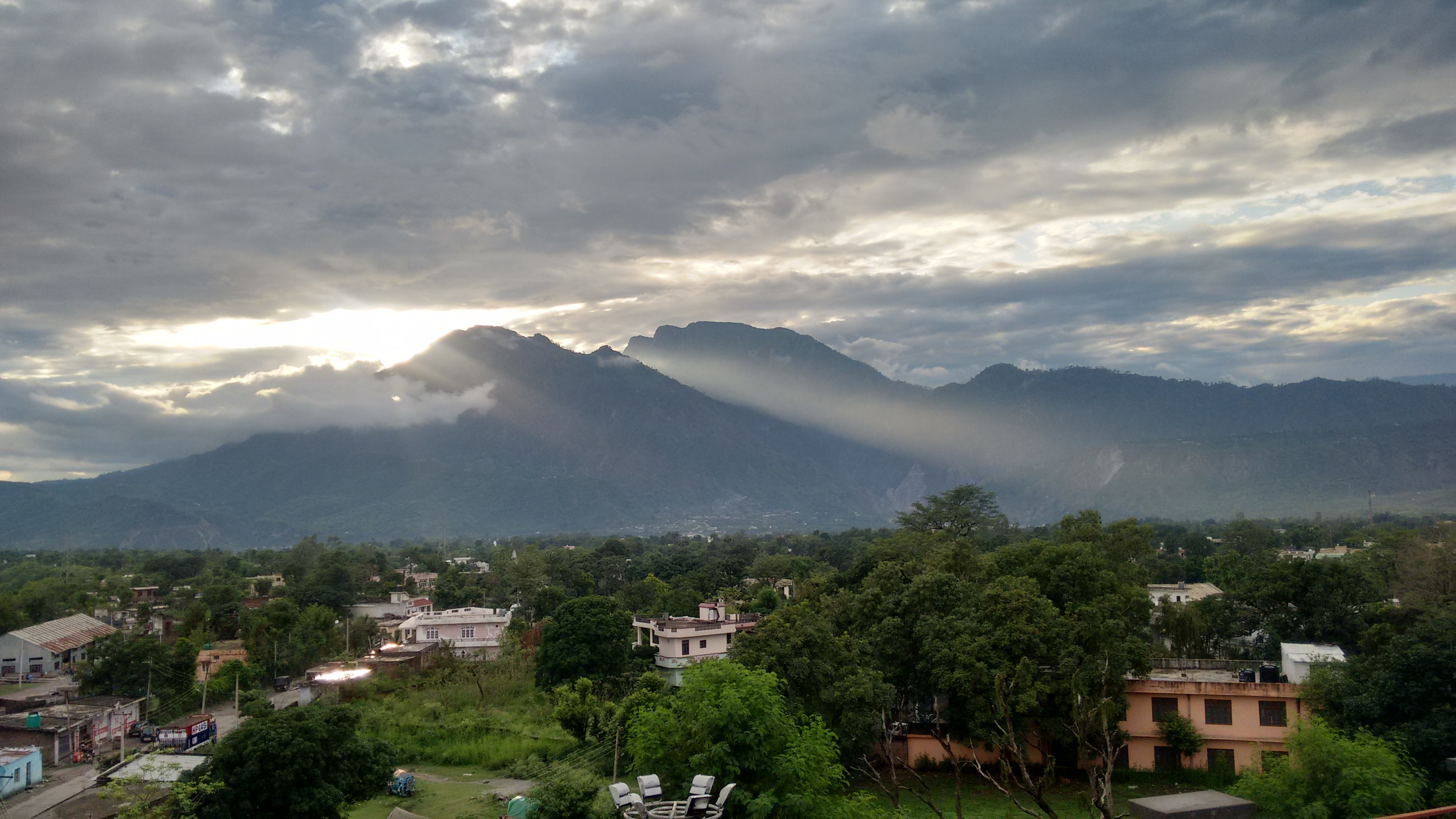
- Skyline of Reasi town, J&K from rooftop.
- Nickname: Gateway of Chenab Railway Bridge
- Location in Jammu and Kashmir, India Reasi (India)
- Coordinates: 33°4′49.895″N 74°50′11.845″E
- Country: India
- Union Territory: Jammu and Kashmir
- District: Reasi
- Elevation: 466 m (1,529 ft)

Population (2011)
  - Total: 36,355
- Demonym(s): Reasian, Reasiya, Rasyali, Rasyalia

Languages
  - Official: Dogri, Gojri, Hindi
  - Other: Pahari, Gojri
- Time zone: UTC+5:30 (IST)
- Postal code: 182311
- Vehicle registration: JK-20

Reasi is a town and a notified area committee and tehsil in Reasi district of the Indian union territory of Jammu and Kashmir, a region disputed between India and Pakistan. Situated on the bank of River Chenab, It is the headquarters of the Reasi district. In the eighth century, Reasi was a part of the Bhimgarh state established by Rajput king Bhim Dev Rasyal. The name Reasi is derived from the town's old name, "Rasyal".

== Geography ==
Reasi is located at 33.08°N 74.83°E. It has an average elevation of 466 metres (1,529 feet).

== Reasi area ==
Reasi is a district 64 km from Jammu. Most of the population ekes out a livelihood from small business ventures, government jobs and agriculture. Of the 12293 hectares of agricultural land in the area, 1011 hectares is irrigated. Important crops are maize, wheat, paddy and bajra. Vegetables are also grown. Climatically, most parts of the area fall in the sub tropical zone and the rest in the temperate zone. Summers are generally warm and winters are cold with snowfall in the higher reaches.

Reasi skyline in summer

== Brief history ==
The erstwhile Bhimgarh State, now called Reasi, was established by Bhim Dev in the eighth century. Brief accounts of successive rulers are known from 1652 when Hari Dev was the king of Jammu. In 1810, during the rule of Diwan Singh, Jammu was in turmoil. Palace intrigues and mutinies shook the administration. It was at this time that Maharaja Ranjit Singh sent Gulab Singh to take control. Gulab Singh came down heavily on the rebels and established the rule of law. After defeating the rebels in the Reasi area, he handed over the administration to his trusted commander, General Zorawar Singh.

In 2005, the first municipal election was held and Mr. Kuldeep Mengi elected as a first chairman of the municipal corporation of Reasi.

During the devastating floods of September 2014, Saddal Village in the Reasi district faced significant devastation, with a landslide that submerged all roads leading to the town.

In 2024, an Islamic terror attack targeted a tour bus carrying pilgrims to and from a Hindu religious site, killing 9 and injuring a further 41.

== Demographics ==
Religion in Reasi City (2011)
1. Hinduism (85.7%)
2. Islam (10.7%)
3. Sikhism (0.05%)
4. Christianity (3.50%)
5. Not Stated (0.05%)

As of 2011 India census, Reasi had a population of 36,355. Males constitute 54% of the population and females 46%. Reasi has an average literacy rate of 75%, higher than the national average of 59.5%: male literacy is 78%, and female literacy is 70%. In Reasi, 13% of the population is under 6 years of age. Reasi has 177 villages with total area of 74932 square km and toal population of 71501 individuals . Main spoken languages are Dogri, Hindi, Urdu, Gojri and Kashmiri.

=== Religion ===
Hinduism is followed by 85.74 people. Islam is followed by 10.66% adherents. Christianity and Sikhism are followed by 3.5% and 0.05% people respectively.

== Historical places ==
Mata Vaishnodevi , Bhumika Temple, Deva Mai, Nau Pindian, Baba Dhansar, Bhimgarh Fort, Kalika Temple, Sula Park, Sihar Baba and Shivkhori are few of the attractions of Reasi besides its picturesque locale and surroundings.

Sihar Baba Waterfall in Summer

== Transport ==
Reasi is just 64 km from Jammu city and can be reached by Road, Rail or Air. Nearest Airport is 80 km is Jammu Airport and Nearest Railway Station is Shri Vaishno Devi Katra railway station is 26 km. But Reasi railway station is a proposed railway station on Jammu-Baramulla railway line.

== Geology and mining ==
Reasi has rich ores of bauxite, iron and precious stones.

The inferred deposits of 5.9 million tonnes of Jammu and Kashmir lithium reserves, accounting to the 2023 the Geological Survey of India as located in the region.

== Current times ==
Being far away from the Jammu - Udhampur Highway and somewhat inaccessible due to the hilly area, economic progress in Reasi has been rather slow. However, the economic activity picked up since the 1980s with the construction of the Salal Hydroelectric Project. The militancy in the 1990s came as a setback to prosperity, but induction of Army in the area has given a sense of security to the people. But what may change the face of Reasi in the not so distant a future, is the Jammu - Srinagar Railway Line, which will pass through Reasi and is likely to bring development and prosperity to this area. After the completion of this project, the development of Reasi would be tremendous. Almost all major banks have their presence in Reasi to meet financial need of newly created district.

== World's highest railway bridge ==
Reasi will have the world's highest railway bridge by December 2022. Chenab Bridge (359 meters), being built by Konkan Railways will overtake the Millau Viaduct (323 meters) located in southern France.

== See also ==
- 2024 Reasi attack
