= Shiv Khori =

Hindu cave shrines in India

Shivkhori शिव खोरी
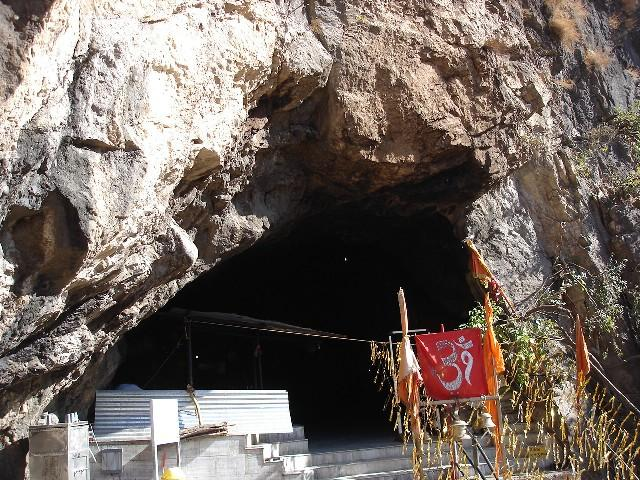
- The Cave of Shivkhori Mandir in Reasi district, J&K, India

- Location within Jammu and Kashmir and India. Shiv Khori (India)

Religion
- Affiliation: Hinduism
- District: Reasi district
- Deity: Lord Shiva

Location
- Location: Sangar, Pouni, Reasi district, J&K
- State: Jammu and Kashmir
- Country: India
- Coordinates: 33.17°N 74.60°E

Website
- www.shivkhori.in

Shiv Khori, is a famous cave shrines of Hindus devoted to lord Shiva, situated in the Sangar village, Pouni, near Reasi town in the Reasi district of Jammu and Kashmir in India.

== Location ==
In Reasi district, there are many shrines such as Mata Vaishno Devi, Merhada Mata is one of them located in Ransoo a village in the Pouni block in Reasi district, which attracts lakhs of devotees annually. Shiv Khori is situated in between the hillocks about 140 km north of Jammu, 120 km from Udhampur and 80 km from Katra.and light vehicles go up to Ransoo, the base camp of pilgrimage. People have to traverse about 3 km on foot on a track recently constructed by the Shiv Khori Shrine Board, Ransoo duly headed by the Divisional Commissioner Jammu as chairman and District Development Commissioner, Reasi as vice-chairman.

== Description ==
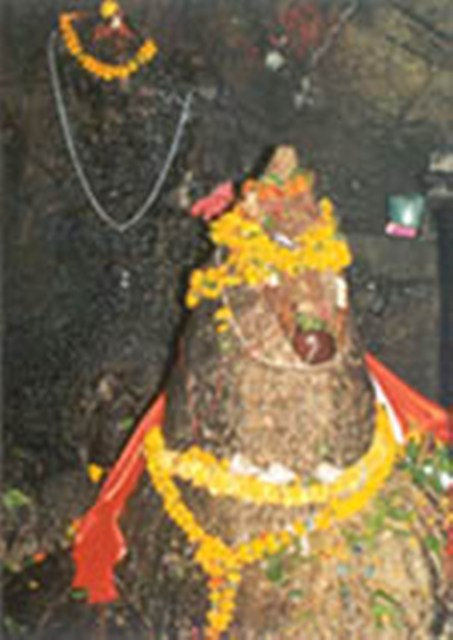
The lingum

Khori means cave (Guffa) and Shiv Khori thus denotes Shiva's cave. This natural cave is about 200 metres long, one metre wide and two to three metres high and contains a self made lingam, which according to the people is unending. The first entrance of the cave is so wide that 300 devotees can be accommodated at a time. Its cavern is spacious to accommodate large number of people. The inner chamber of the cave is smaller.

The passage from outer to the inner chamber is low and small, at one spot it divides itself into two parts. One of these is believed to have led to Kashmir where Swami Amarnath cave is located. It is now closed as some sadhus who dared to go ahead never returned. To reach the sanctum sanctorum, one has to stoop low, crawl or adjust his body sideward. Inside a naturally created image of Lord Shiva, about 4 metres high, is visible. The cave abounds with a number of other natural objects having resemblance with Goddess Parvati, Ganesha and Nandigan. The cave roof is etched with snake formations, the water trickles through these on Shiva Lingam. Pigeons are also seen here like Swami Amar Nath cave which presents good omens for pilgrimages.

== Rise in popularity ==
The Shiv Khori shrine, located in Jammu and Kashmir, was relatively unknown about 40 to 50 years ago but has gained significant popularity in recent decades. Initially, only a few thousand pilgrims visited the site, but following the establishment of the Shiv Khori Shrine Board in December 2003, the number of devotees has increased dramatically. In 2005, the number of visitors surpassed 300,000, and by 2016, it was expected to exceed 2 million.

Approximately 30% of the pilgrims come from within the state, while 70% travel from other states. The shrine hosts an annual three-day Maha Shivratri mela, attracting thousands of pilgrims from various regions to seek blessings from Lord Shiva. This festival typically takes place in February or the first week of March.

== Development ==
=== Pilgrimage track development ===
In response to the growing influx of pilgrims, the Shiv Khori Shrine Board has implemented several development initiatives to enhance facilities for devotees. These include the construction of a Shrine Guest House at a cost of Rs. 1.9 million at Ransoo, the base camp, a Reception Centre, and a Pony Shed at an estimated cost of Rs. 8 million. Additionally, tile work on the 3-km track to the shrine is nearing completion, and efforts to plant ornamental and medicinal plants along the route are underway. Other improvements include modern electrification of the cave, provision of oxygen and electric generators, exhaust fans, shelter sheds with toilet facilities, and the installation of railings from the base camp to the shrine.

=== Facilities for pilgrimage ===
The Shiv Khori Shrine Board is also working on additional facilities such as a 15,000-liter water reservoir, proper sanitation, a 25 kV electric transformer, cloak rooms, and permanent bus services from Katra, Udhampur, and Jammu. Security arrangements are being enhanced with the establishment of a police post, a dispensary, and an STD PCO. To accommodate the increasing number of pilgrims, an exit tunnel was constructed by the Board in February of an unspecified year to facilitate smooth darshan of Lord Shiva.

=== Ropeway ===
Shiv Khori ropeway, 2.12 km from Darshan Deori to Shiv Khori Hindu shrine in Reasi district, tender for DPR were cancelled in early 2025 due to the court case and will be reissued.

== Important places near Shivkhori ==
- Jammu
- Katra
- Vaishnodevi
- Agharjitto
- NavDevi
- Baba Dhansar
- Reasi
- Bhimgarh Fort
- kalika Temple
- Siar Baba
