= Reasi district =

- District of Jammu and Kashmir administered by India
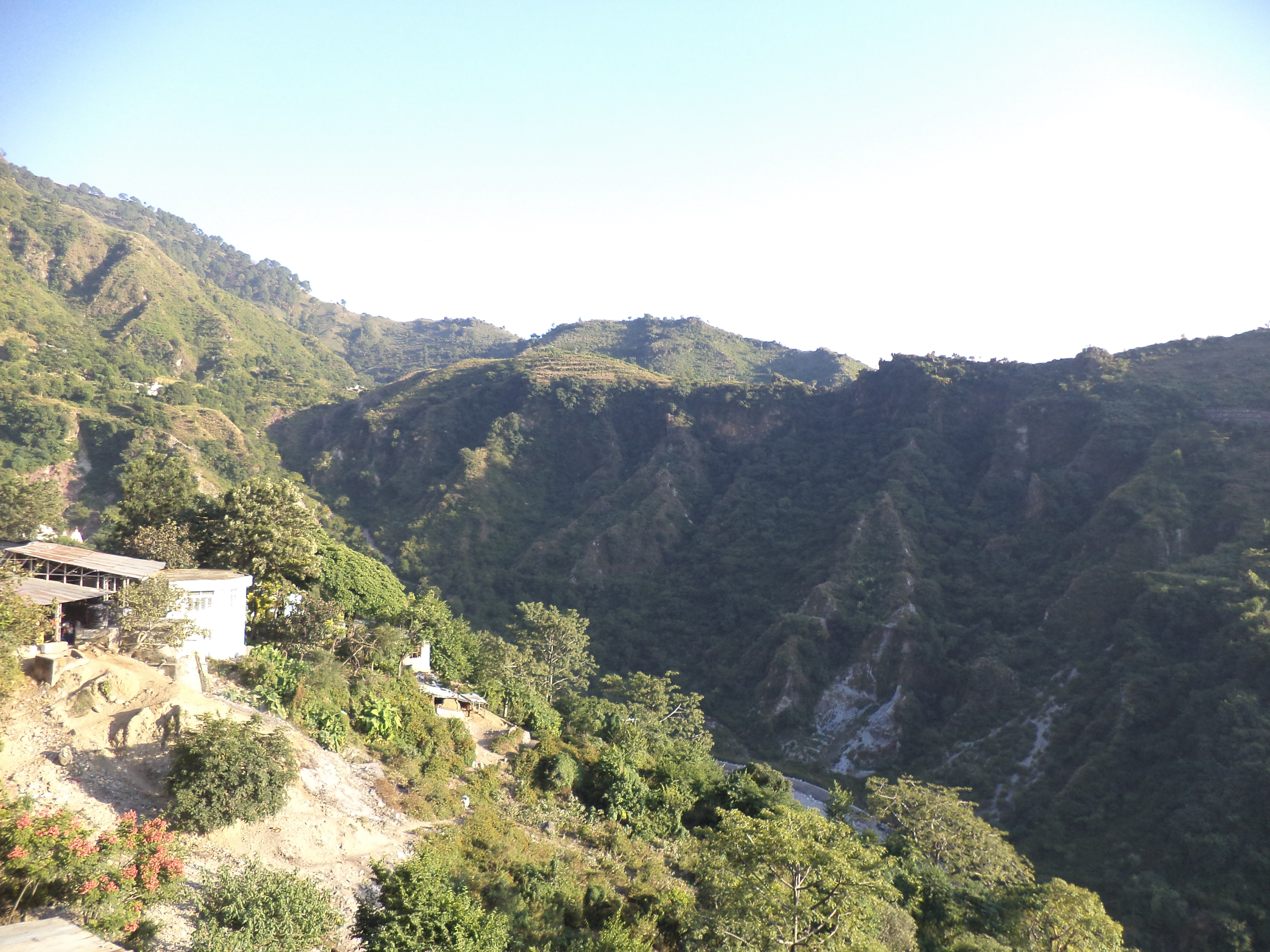
- Mountains near Vaishno Devi Temple
- Interactive map of Reasi district
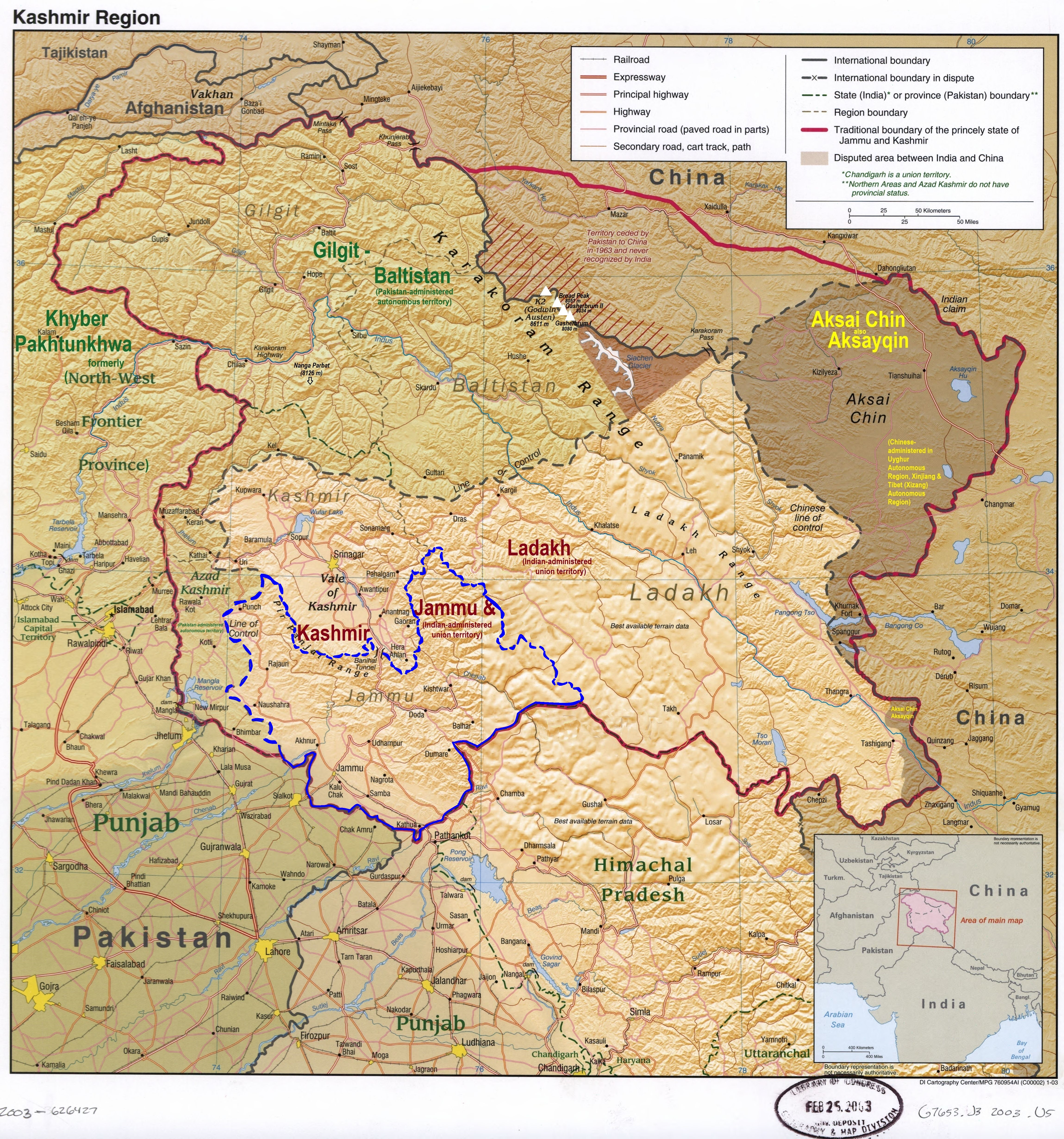
- Reasi district is in the Jammu division (shown with neon blue boundary) of Indian-administered Jammu and Kashmir (shaded in tan region
- Coordinates (Reasi): 33.09°N 74.84°E
- Administering country: India
- Union territory: Jammu and Kashmir
- Division: Jammu
- Headquarters: Reasi
- Tehsils: Reasi, Pouni, Katra, Bhamag, Arnas, Throo, Chassana, Thakrakote, Mahore

Area
  - Total: 1,719 km^{2} (664 sq mi)

Population (2011)
  - Total: 314,667
  - Density: 183.1/km^{2} (474.1/sq mi)
  - Urban: 8.6%

Demographics
  - Literacy: 58.15%
  - Sex ratio: 890

Languages
  - Official: Dogri, Kashmiri, Urdu, Hindi, English
  - Spoken: Gujari, Pahari, Punjabi
- Time zone: UTC+05:30 (IST)
- Vehicle registration: JK-20
- Website: reasi.nic.in

Reasi district is an administrative district in the Jammu division of Indian-administered Jammu and Kashmir in the disputed Kashmir region. The Reasi district is bordered by Udhampur district and Ramban district in the east, Jammu district in the south, Rajouri district in the west and by Kulgam district on the north. The Reasi and Rajouri tehsils formed a joint district called the "Reasi district" at the time of the princely state's accession to India in 1947. As part of the reorganisation, the two tehsils were separated and Reasi was merged with the Udhampur district. It again became a separate district in 2006.

Reasi is one of the oldest towns of the Jammu and Kashmir State. It was the seat of the erstwhile Bhimgarh State, said to have been established by Raja Bhim Dev sometime in the 8th century. It remained an independent principality till 1822, when Maharaja Gulab Singh the then Dogra Raja of Jammu hill region, under the Sikh Empire, consolidated the small states.

== History ==
=== Bhimgarh Fort ===
Bhimgarh Fort also known as ‘Reasi Fort’ is a historical fort located in the town of Reasi on a hillock approximately 150 meters high. As per local lore initially, the fort was made of clay which later on was reconstructed with stone masonry and was generally used by the royal family for taking shelter during emergencies. Presently the fort is in the charge of the Department of Archaeology, J&K Government since 1989. Today the fort stands out as one of the important landmarks in the town. During that time this was damaged several times due to its age and natural violence. Over time, the government has undertaken reconstruction efforts to preserve the fort as a historical landmark in the city.

=== Inside India ===
After the accession of the princely state of Jammu and Kashmir to India in 1947, the Rajouri and Reasi tehsils of the former "Reasi district" were separated. Rajouri was merged with the Indian-administered Poonch district, India and Reasi was merged with the Udhampur district.

The people of this hilly area have long agitated for restoring the district status for Reasi. The Wazir Commission report, among other recommendations, proposed that it be upgraded to a district. Rishi Kumar Koushal, a prominent leader of the erstwhile Jan Sangh, now Bharatiya Janata Party, led the agitation to restore the district status in the late nineties.

Reasi was upgraded to district level in 2007.

== Demographics ==
=== Population ===
Historical populations
Year	Pop.	±%
1901	57,195	—
1911	61,506	+7.5%
1921	64,243	+4.4%
1931	68,335	+6.4%
1941	74,224	+8.6%
1951	81,852	+10.3%
1961	89,481	+9.3%
1971	116,387	+30.1%
1981	160,091	+37.6%
1991	200,059	+25.0%
2001	247,694	+23.8%
2011	314,667	+27.0%
source: † 1951 and 1991 populations are estimated.

According to the 2011 census, Reasi district had a population of 314,667, roughly equal to the nation of The Bahamas. This gave it a ranking of 570th in India (out of a total of 640). The district had a population density of 184 inhabitants per square kilometre (480/sq mi). Its population growth rate over the decade 2001-2011 was 27.06%.

=== Social groups ===
Dogras and Gujjars are two major ethnic groups of the Reasi district. Dogras are mainly Hindus, Gujjars make up the majority among Muslims, followed by Kashmiris and Paharis also found in the district.

=== Language ===
Languages of Reasi district (2011)
1. Dogri (43.8%)
2. Gojri (25.6%)
3. Kashmiri (18.3%)
4. Pahari (6.64%)
5. Hindi (1.62%)
6. Others (4.05%)

Dogri and Gujari are two major spoken languages in Reasi district. Dogri Dogri by 43.76% and Gujari 25.60% by district's total population. Other main languages include: Kashmiri spoken by 18.3%, Pahari spoken by 6.6% and Hindi spoken by 1.6%. Kashmiri is predominantly spoken in Gul Gulabgarh tehsil, while Dogri is the predominant language in Reasi tehsil. Almost 4% people speak other languages including Punjabi.

=== Sex ratio & literacy rate ===
Reasi has a sex ratio of 890 females for every 1000 males (which varies with religion), and a literacy rate of 59.42%. 8.58% of the population lives in urban areas. The Scheduled Castes and Scheduled Tribes account for 12.00% and 28.08% of the population of the district.

Sex Ratio in Reasi District in 2011 Census. (no. females per 1,000 males)
Religion (and population)	Sex Ratio
Muslim (pop 156,275)	915
Hindu (pop 153,898)	869
Sikh (pop 3,107)	924
Other (pop 1,387)	558
Total (pop 314,667)	890

=== Religion ===
Religion in Reasi district (2011)
Religion	Percent
Islam	49.66%
Hinduism	48.91%
Sikhism	0.99%
Other or not stated	0.44%

Reasi has a population which is nearly evenly split between Muslims and Hindus. Reasi's population stands at 314,667 (2011), of whom 49.67% are Muslims and 48.90% are Hindus.

Tehsil	Muslim	Hindu	Sikh	Others
Gul Gulabgarh	79.27	19.78	0.56	0.39
Reasi	23.43	74.72	1.37	0.48

Reasi district: religion, gender ratio, and % urban of population, according to the 2011 Census
	Hindu	Muslim	Christian	Sikh	Buddhist	Jain	Other	Not stated	Total
Total	153,898	156,275	1,208	3,107	15	7	3	154	314,667
Total	48.91%	49.66%	0.38%	0.99%	0.00%	0.00%	0.00%	0.05%	100.00%
Male	82,358	81,598	782	1,615	11	4	3	90	166,461
Female	71,540	74,677	426	1,492	4	3	0	64	148,206
Gender ratio (% female)	46.5%	47.8%	35.3%	48.0%	26.7%	42.9%	0.0%	41.6%	47.1%
Sex ratio (no. of females per 1,000 males)	869	915	545	924	–	–	–	–	890
Urban	23,245	3,076	461	194	3	0	0	17	26,996
Rural	130,653	153,199	747	2,913	12	7	3	137	287,671
% Urban	15.1%	2.0%	38.2%	6.2%	20.0%	0.0%	0.0%	11.0%	8.6%

== Geography ==
Reasi is 64 km from Jammu and is bounded by tehsil Gool-Gulabgarh in the north, tehsil Sunderbani and Kalakote of district Rajouri in the west, tehsil Udhampur in the east, tehsils Jammu and Akhnoor of district Jammu in the south.

Climatically, a major part of this sub-division falls in the sub-tropical zone and the rest in temperate zone.

=== Access ===
Being far away from Jammu–Udhampur–Srinagar Highway 1-A and somewhat inaccessible due to the hilly area, economic progress in the mostly hilly region of Reasi has been rather slow. With the commissioning of Salal Hydroelectric Project at Dhyangarh near Reasi, the economic activity of the area has picked up considerably. Construction work for this project was started in 1970 by the National Hydro-Electric Power Corporation (NHPC) and the project was commissioned in 1987 when the first stage of 345 Megawatt power station was completed and balance/the second stage of the project with 345 MW was commissioned in 1995 making the total generation to 690 MW. Power from this project flows to the Northern Grid from where it is distributed to the states of J&K, Punjab, Haryana, Delhi, Himachal Pradesh, Rajasthan, Uttar Pradesh and Chandigarh.

The Jammu–Srinagar–Baramulla Railway line which is under construction passes through the Reasi district. The Railway line to Katra was inaugurated on 4 July 2014, by the Indian Prime Minister Narendra Modi at Shri Mata Vaishno Devi Katra railway station. From Katra, the Railway line traverses to Reasi-Banihal area with stations at Reasi, Salal A–Salal B, Surukot, Barala, Sangaldan, Kohli and Laole. The 1,315-metre-long (4,314 ft) Chenab Rail Bridge was constructed over the Chenab River near Salal with a height of 383.10 meters from the river surface.

== Administration ==
Reasi district is one of the 10 districts in the J&K, which came into existence on 1 April 2007. It is predominantly a hill district, which enjoys variable climatic conditions, ranging from sub-tropical to semi-temperate. The district can be divided into 'hilly' and 'low-lying hilly' regions.

The district is divided into nine tehsils and 22 niabats. There are 12 development blocks with 147 panchayat halquas.

=== Tehsils ===
- Reasi
- Pouni
- Katra
- Bhomag
- Arnas
- Throo
- Chassana
- Thakrakote
- Mahore

=== Blocks ===
- Reasi
- Gulabgarh
- Pouni
- Katra
- Bhomag
- Arnas
- Thuroo
- Chassana
- Thakrakote
- Mahore
- Panthal
- Jij

=== Villages ===
- Domaldi
- Thanpal

== Natural resources ==
Lithium deposits have been discovered in Reasi, the first such discovery in India. The Geological Survey of India estimated that there are 5.9 million tonnes of lithium deposits in the Salal-Haimama region in the district as confirmed by India's Ministry of Mines.

== Tourism ==
=== Religious sites ===
Major Hindu pilgrimage sites like Vaishno Devi Temple, Shiv Khori, Baba Dhansar and Siyad Baba Waterfall are located in this district.

==== Sites ====
- Rama Kunda
- Shivkhori
- Vaishno Devi Temple
- Kalika Temple
- Baba Dhansar
- Dhyangarh
- Baba Bidda
- Siarh Baba
- Dhera Baba

=== Other tourist sites ===
- Sula Park
- Bhimgarh Fort
- Dewel Marg
- Kote Gali
- Ans River
- Pangantop
- Gulab Garh
- Dhagantop
- Thanpal
