= Pouni, Jammu and Kashmir =

Pouni
- Village
- Location in Jammu and Kashmir, India Pouni (India)
- Coordinates: 33.09°N 74.68°E
- Country: India
- Union Territory: Jammu and Kashmir
- District: Reasi

Population (2011)
  - Total: 1,259

Languages
  - Spoken: Dogri, Hindi, Gojri
- Time zone: UTC+5:30 (IST)
- PIN: 185203

Pouni is a village and municipality in Reasi district of the Indian union territory of Jammu and Kashmir. The town is located 25 km from the district headquarters Reasi Town.

== Demographics ==
According to the 2011 census of India, Pouni village has 254 households. The literacy rate of Pouni was 85.08% compared to 67.16% of Jammu and Kashmir. In Pouni, Male literacy stands at 90.21% while the female literacy rate was 79.70%.

Demographics (2011 Census)
	Total	Male	Female
Population	1259	647	612
Children aged below 6 years	160	85	75
Scheduled caste	60	29	31
Scheduled tribe	17	10	7
Literacy	85.08%	90.21%	79.70%
Workers (all)	538	319	219
Main workers (total)	383	312	71
Marginal workers (total)	155	7	148

== Transport ==
=== Road ===
Pouni is well-connected by road to other places in Jammu and Kashmir and India by Pouni Road, NH 144 and NH 144A along Dubey karyana Store.

=== Rail ===
The nearest major railway stations to Pouni are Reasi railway station but it is proposed construction railway station and another railway station are Shri Mata Vaishno Devi Katra railway station, Jammu Tawi railway station and Udhampur Railway Station located at a distance of 46 Kilometres, 90 Kilometres and 87 Kilometres respectively.

=== Air ===
The nearest airport to Pouni is Jammu Airport located at a distance of 95 kilometres and is a 2.5-hour drive.

== See also ==
- Jammu and Kashmir
- Reasi district
