= Domaldi, Reasi =

Village in Jammu and Kashmir, India

Domaldi is a village in the Reasi district of the Jammu and Kashmir union territory of India.
