= Chenab Rail Bridge =

Railway bridge in Jammu and Kashmir, India

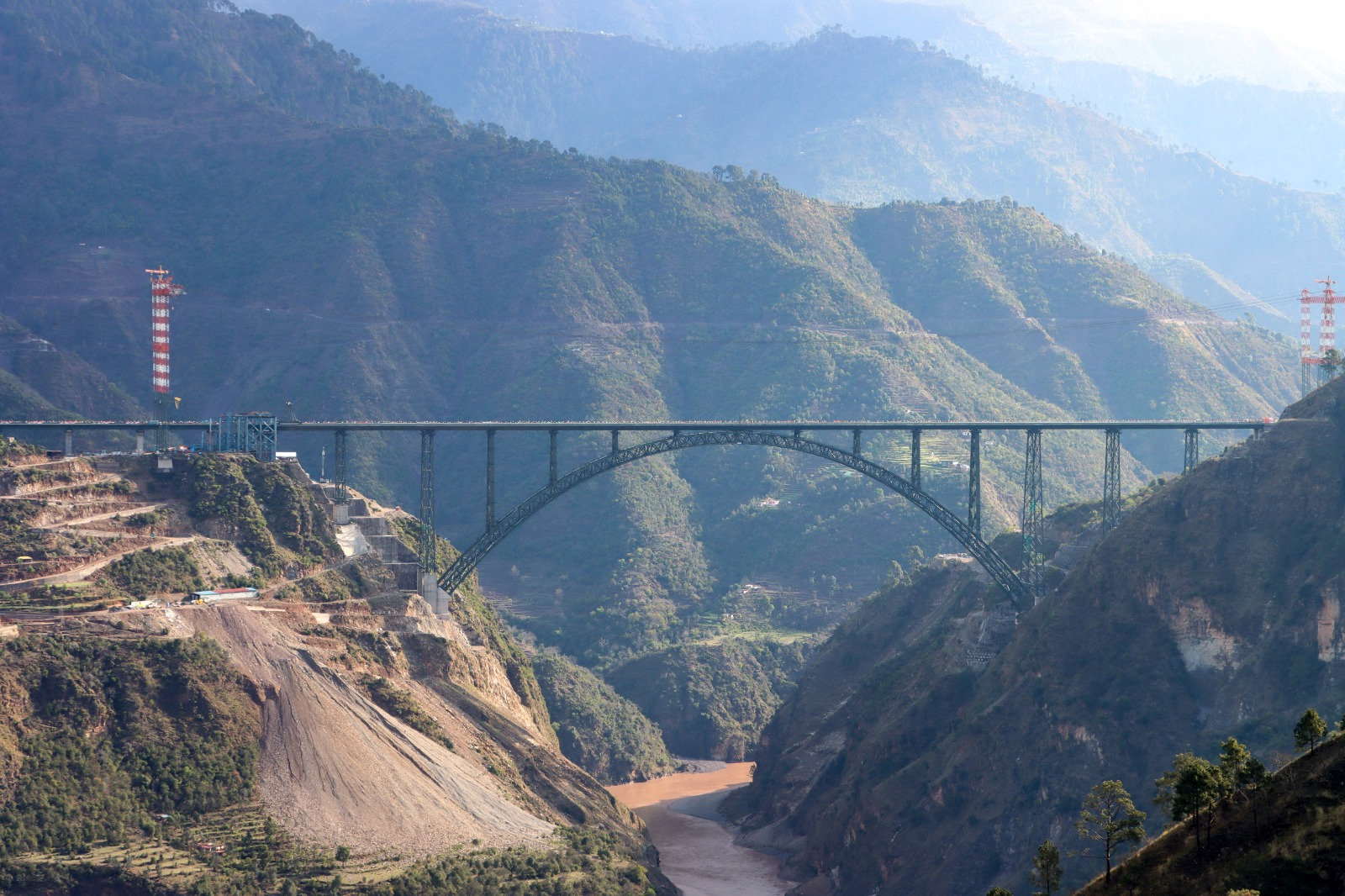
- Chenab Rail Bridge in 2023
- Coordinates: 33°9′3″N 74°52′59″E
- Carries: Trains
- Crosses: Chenab River
- Locale: Reasi district, Jammu and Kashmir
- Owner: Indian Railways
- Maintained by: Indian Railways

Characteristics
- Design: Deck arch bridge
- Material: Steel and concrete
- Total length: 1,315 m (4,314 ft)
- Width: 13.5 m (44 ft)
- Height: 359 m (1,178 ft)
- Longest span: 467 m (1,532 ft)
- No. of spans: 17

History
- Designer: WSP Finland; Leonhardt, Andrä und Partner; Vienna Consulting Engineers; Defence Research & Development Organization; Indian Institute of Science
- Constructed by: Afcons Infrastructure; Ultra Construction; VSL India
- Construction cost: ₹14.86 billion (US$160 million)
- Opened: 6 June 2025; 17 months ago
- Inaugurated: 13 August 2022; 4 years ago

Location
- Interactive map of Chenab Rail Bridge

The Chenab Rail Bridge is a railway bridge over the Chenab River in Reasi district of the union territory of Jammu and Kashmir in India. It is a steel and concrete bridge spanning 1,315 m (4,314 ft) across the river gorge. The structure consists of an approach bridge which is 530 m (1,740 ft) long and a 785 m (2,575 ft)-long deck arch bridge. With a deck height of 359 m (1,178 ft) from the river bed, the arch bridge is the highest rail bridge in the world. It is located between Kauri and Bakkal rail stations on the Jammu–Baramulla line.

The bridge was constructed at a cost of ₹14.86 billion (US$160 million). The project was overseen by Konkan Railway Corporation of the Indian Railways. The construction work started in 2017, and the base supports were completed in November 2017 with the arch constructed by April 2021. The bridge was fully completed in August 2022, and the first trial runs were conducted in June 2024. The bridge was opened for rail traffic on 6 June 2025 by Narendra Modi, the Prime Minister of India.

== Background and planning ==
In the late 1970s, the Government of India planned to establish a railway line to connect Jammu with the Kashmir Valley. The line would connect Kashmir with the rest of the Indian railway network and aid in the economic activity of the region. It would also serve as a strategic link to the Kashmir region all round the year as the road link between Jammu and Kashmir region is often cut off by snowfall during winters. Though the foundation stone for the Jammu-Baramulla railway project was laid in 1983, construction started only after the funds were allocated in the mid 1990s.

A feasibility survey was conducted in 1997 for connecting Udhampur in the Jammu region to Srinagar in the valley. The line would have to pass through the Pir Panjal range of the Himalayas, which necessitated multiple tunnels and bridges. The line between Katra and Srinagar necessitated a crossing of a deep gorge formed by the Chenab River. A high-altitude rail bridge was approved to cross the river between Kauri and Bakkal, about 23 km (14 mi) north of Katra, in Reasi district. The planned construction area was located in a major seismic zone (zone V–highest risk) with a fractured geology, and in a conflict prone zone.

The Jammu–Udhampur section of the planned Jammu–Baramulla line was opened in April 2005. Subsequently, the section between Banihal and Baramulla via Srinagar, was opened in phases from 2008 to 2013. The section between Udhampur and Katra was opened for traffic in July 2014.

== Design ==
The Indian Railways assigned the supervision of the bridge construction project to Konkan Railway Corporation on behalf of Northern Railways. The bridge was declared a national project due to its national importance in connecting Kashmir to the existing lines of Indian Railways. Konkan railway invited tenders for the project in November 2003. WSP Finland served as the main designer of the bridge, with Leonhardt, Andrä und Partner designing the bridge arches, and Vienna Consulting Engineers aiding in the design of the pylons. The Defence Research & Development Organization aided in developing the blast proofing of the bridge, and the Indian Institute of Science helped with the study of the protection of the foundation of the bridge.

A 1,315 m (4,314 ft)-long bridge was planned at a cost of ₹14.86 billion (US$160 million). The main deck of the bridge was planned at a height of 359 m (1,178 ft) above the river bed, making it the highest rail bridge in the world. The bridge consists of two parts– an approach bridge which is 530 m (1,740 ft) long and the 785 m (2,575 ft)-long deck arch bridge. The arch bridge consists of a two-ribbed arch design and prefabricated steel boxes filled with concrete used in chords of the trusses. The bridge consists of 17 spans, with the main span measuring 467 m (1,532 ft) in length. The spans are supported by steel piers, the highest of which measures 133.7 m (439 ft). The super structure consists of 161 girder plates each of 8 m (26 ft) length and 8 mm (0.31 in) thickness. The bridge is about 13.5 m (44 ft) wide, and can accommodate two railway tracks with a separation of 1.2 m (3 ft 11 in). The main bridge arch structure weighs 10,619 tonnes and is supported by two cable-attached pylons measuring 130 m (430 ft) and 100 m (330 ft), respectively.

The design and construction is compliant with various national and global standards and codes, including Indian Standards, Indian Railway Standards, Indian Road Congress, British Standards, and International Union of Railways. The bridge is designed to have a life of 120 years and is designated to handle rail speeds of up to 100 km/h (62 mph). The bridge was designed to withstand earthquakes up to a magnitude of eight on the Richter scale, high-intensity blasts equivalent to about 40 tonnes of TNT, temperatures up to −20 °C (−4 °F) and wind speeds of up to 266 km/h (165 mph).

== Construction and opening ==
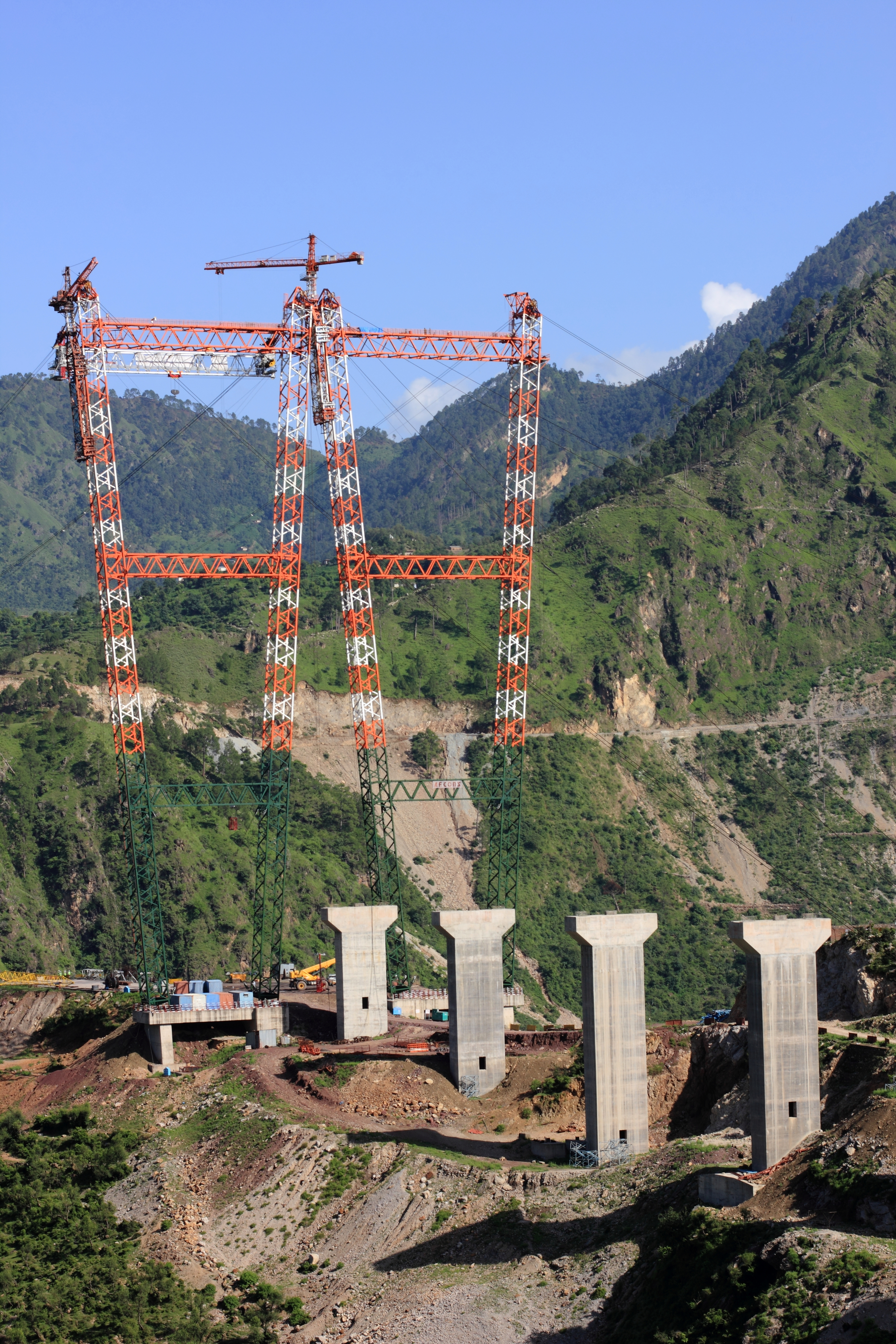
Piers of the approach bridge in 2013

The construction contract was awarded to Chenab Bridge Project Undertaking, a joint venture between Indian companies Afcons Infrastructure and VSL India, and South Korean company Ultra Construction. As the construction site was located amidst the Himalayas, the construction involved several logistical challenges. Due to limited connectivity, workshops were set up at select locations on either side of the river valley. The electricity used was generated locally, and the water was transported using pipes from the river. Proofing of the foundation, and viaduct and arch was done by the companies URS Corporation and COWI respectively. Stability analysis was done ITASCA Consulting Group along with IIT Delhi, and seismic analysis was done by IIT Delhi and IIT Roorkee.

The viaduct piers are made of self-compacting concrete filled into steel boxes. The construction used about 28,660 tonnes of steel, 66,000 m^{3} of concrete and 84 km (52 mi) of bolts and cables. The steel was supplied by the Steel Authority of India. Cabling for the pylon was installed by Jochum Andreas Seiltransporte. After the steel columns were built, a derrick crane was used to install the arch sections and deck spans in place, with temporary cables holding them in place. Specially designed high-strength friction-grip bolts were used for joining the two ends of the bridge arches. Due to the extreme location of the bridge, a new corrosion resistant painting scheme was developed, having a longer life time of about 15 years, compared to five to seven years in most other Indian railway bridges. The painting contract was awarded to AkzoNobel.

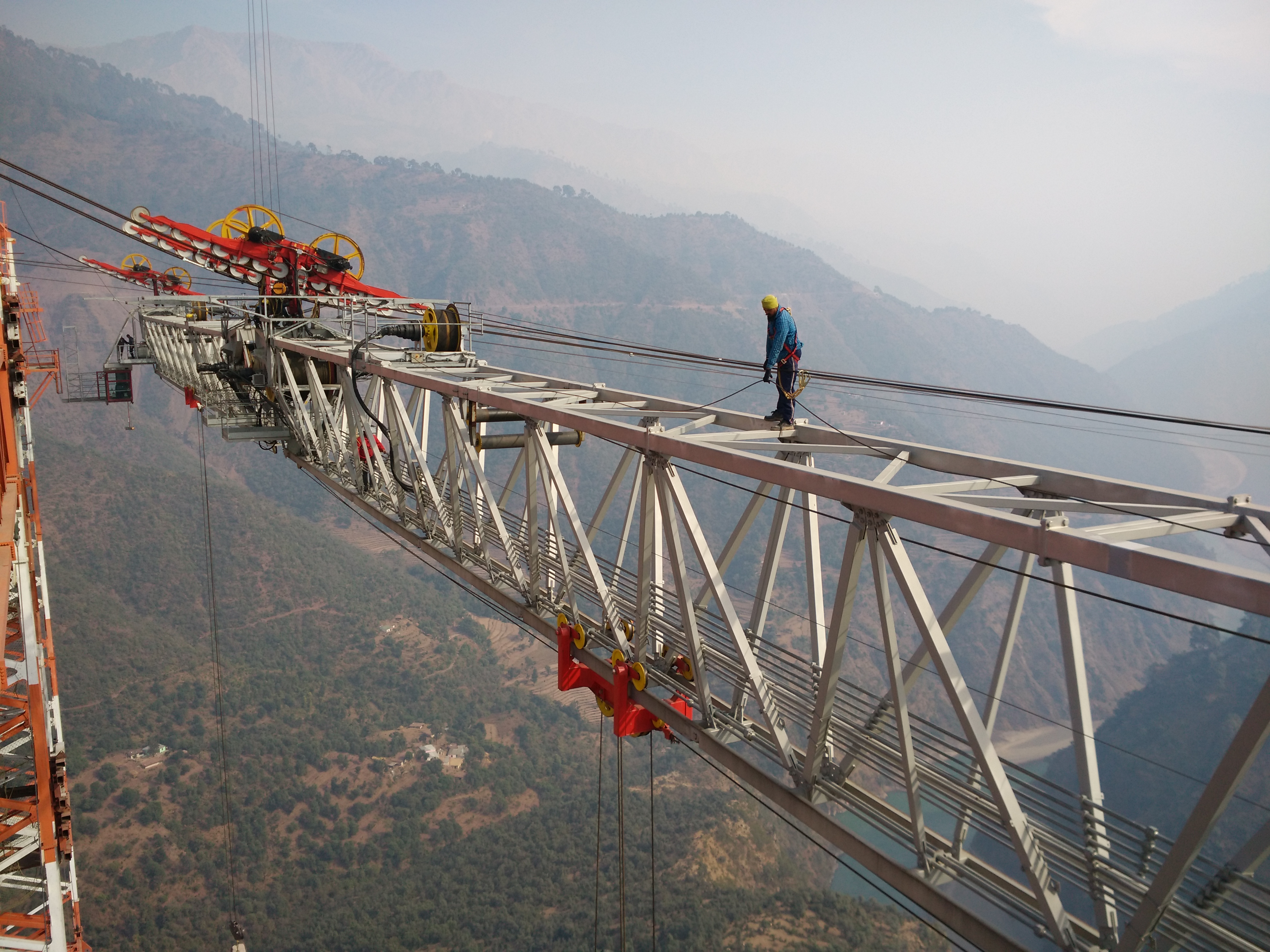
Aerial view of Chenab Bridge during construction of the arch

The project was initially slated for completion by 2009. However, construction was halted in late 2008 due to concerns about the safety and stability of the bridge. Construction work resumed in 2010 after modifications were made to the main span design. The base supports of the bridge were completed in November 2017. Construction progressed actively in 2018, with initial plans to complete the bridge by May 2019. However, progress was slower than expected, and several deadlines were missed. By January 2020, only about 83% of the construction had been completed, with a subsequent planned opening in 2021. The arches were completed by April 2021, with a new deadline set for 2022. The bridge was fully completed and inaugurated on 13 August 2022.

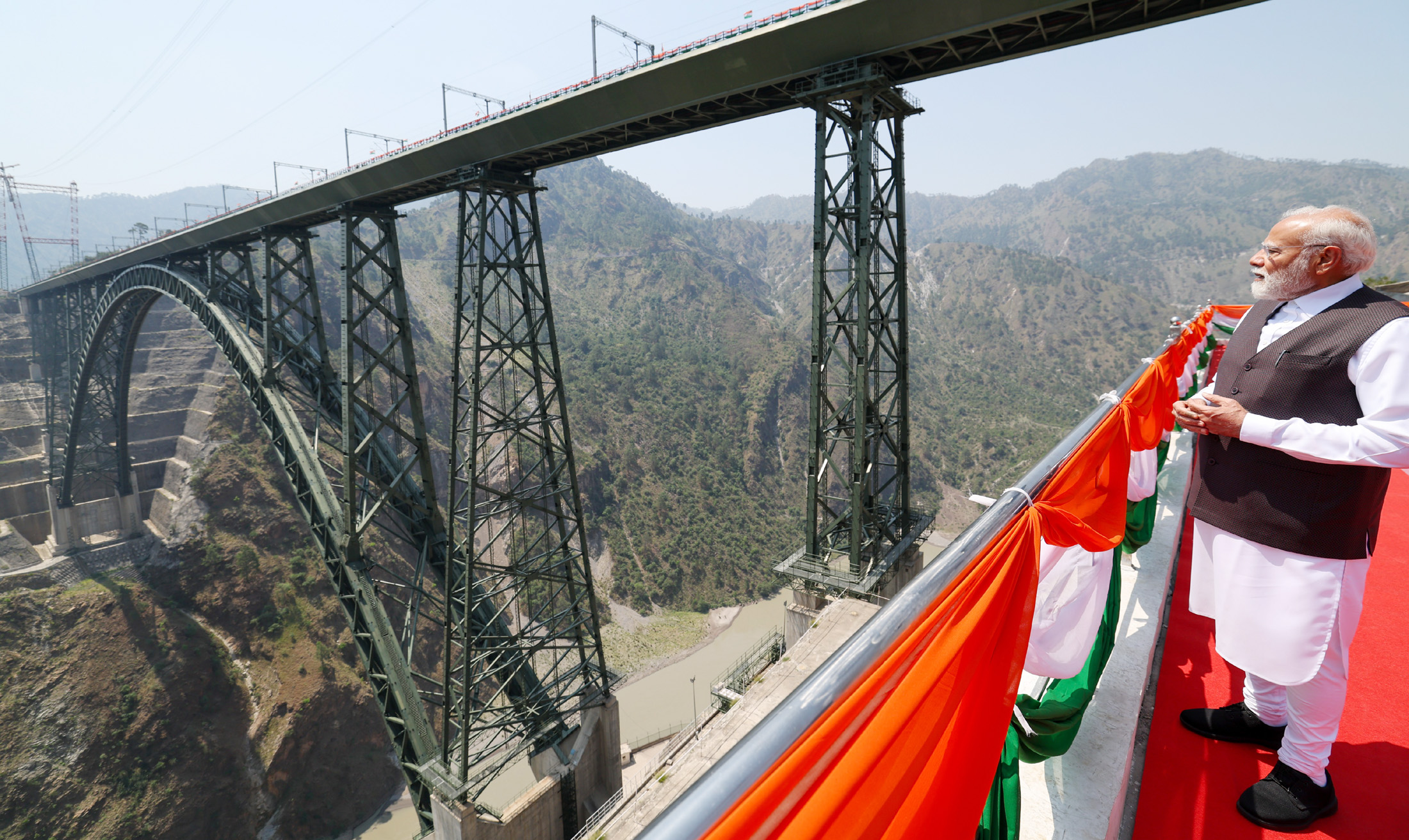
Inauguration of the bridge

In February 2023, the laying of railway tracks on the bridge commenced, and consisted of a single railway track. While the initial target for commencing rail traffic was January 2024, the expected opening date was pushed to late 2024. Trial runs on various sections of the Katra–Banihal sector commenced in December 2023, with full-scale trial runs across the entire sector including the bridge in June 2024. The bridge was planned to open for regular railway traffic in April 2025, which was later postponed due to adverse weather. The bridge was opened for regular rail traffic by Narendra Modi, the Prime Minister of India, on 6 June 2025, with the launch of train services connecting Katra in the Jammu region and Srinagar in the Kashmir valley.

== See also ==
- Anji Khad Bridge
- Geostrategic rail lines in India
- India-China Border Roads
- List of bridges in India
