= Kodlamane =

Coordinates: 14°14′9″N 74°30′31″E

Kodlamane Shree Vishnumurthy Temple
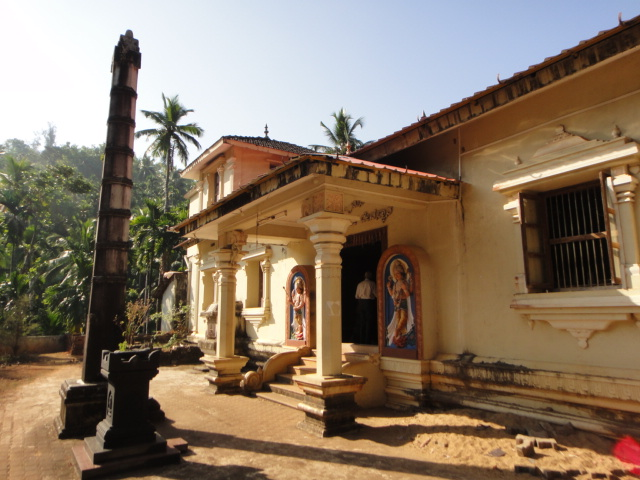
- Kodlamane Shree Vishnumurthy Temple

Religion
- Affiliation: Hinduism
- District: Uttara Kannada district
- Deity: Vishnu

Location
- Location: Honnavar taluka
- State: Karnataka
- Country: India
- Interactive map of Kodlamane Shree Vishnumurthy Temple

Kodlamane is a Tirth Khestra and Hindu pilgrimage site in Honnavar taluka of Uttara Kannada district in Karnataka state, India. It is the site of the Kodlamane Shree Vishnumurthy Temple of Serenity and Mystery.
