= Bhimgarh Fort =

Fort near Reasi in Jammu and Kashmir

Coordinates: 33°04′48″N 74°49′48″E

- Part of Jammu
- Reasi, Jammu and Kashmir, India
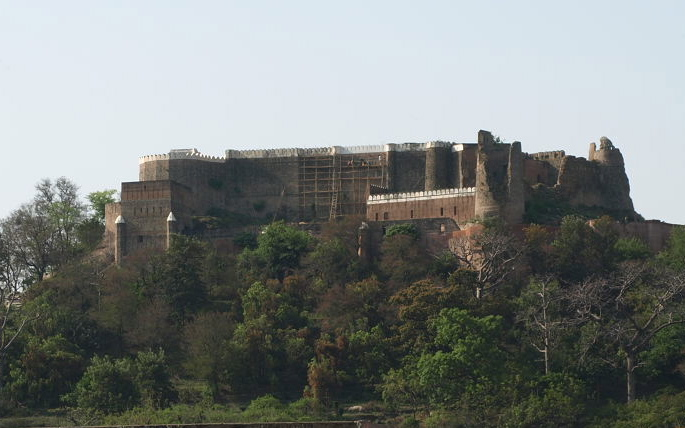
- Bhimgarh Fort

Site information
- Type: Fort
- Controlled by: Government of Jammu and Kashmir
- Condition: Ruins

Site history
- Built by: Various
- Materials: Granite Stones and lime mortar

Bhimgarh Fort, generally known as the Reasi Fort, is near Reasi, a town approximately 64 km northwest of Jammu. The fort is on a hillock approximately 150 metres high. Initially, it was constructed of clay by Raja Bhimdev Rasyal. Later on, one of the heirs of Raja Rishipal Rana reconstructed it using stone. It was used by the royal family members for taking shelter during emergencies. The renovation of the fort was started by Gulab Singh of Jammu and Kashmir in 1817 and continued till 1841. Construction and consolidation of Bhimgarh fort was further advanced by the advent of General Zorawar Singh. A new entry gate and stone wall 1 meter wide and 50 meters long was built all around, thereby making it less vulnerable to attacks.

The main entry gate is made of Baluka stones with carving architecture. The front wall has loopholes and statues of the Goddess Mahakali and God Hanuman. The fort has a temple, a pond, rooms of different sizes, armoury and treasury. After the death of Maharaja Gulab Singh, his heir Maharaja Ranbir Singh and Maharaja Pratap Singh used Bhimgarh Fort as a treasury and armoury. During Maharaja Hari Singh's rule, an English minister ordered that the armoury be destroyed and shifted the treasury to Jammu.

Bhimgar Fort was handed over to the Jammu and Kashmir State Archaeology Department in 1989 on the orders of the state government. In 1990, the fort was renovated by the Vaishno Devi Sthapna Board. The surrounding areas were given a facelift with the construction of gardens and pathways. The fort was then opened to the public. Although the fort has been devastated by earthquakes and lack of maintenance, it stands out as an important landmark in the town. The inferred deposits of 5.9 million tonnes of Jammu and Kashmir lithium reserves, accounting to the 2023 the Geological Survey of India as located inmate near vicinity of the castle.

== History ==
The site of Bhimgarh Fort has been occupied since at least the early medieval period. It was first constructed (in mud and clay) in the 8th century AD by Raja Bhim Dev, the ruler who founded the medieval Bhimgarh kingdom. The fortress was originally a simple clay-and-mud enclosure, giving it the name Bhimgarh (“Fort of Bhim”). In the later medieval era, Raja Rishipal Rana, who is known as founder of Reasi town rebuilt the structure in stone. In the late 17th century, the political map of Jammu was reorganized. In 1672 Raja Gajay Singh of Jammu created a jagir (estate) out of Reasi and neighboring Akhnoor, granting it to his younger brother Jaswant Dev. Jaswant Dev and his family then ruled from Bhimgarh. Jaswant’s son Rattan Singh took over Reasi, and his grandson Maan Singh is recorded as reinforcing the fort’s walls during the early 18th century. A local warrior named Bhadur Singh is also noted to have assisted in fortifying Bhimgarh during this period.

By the late 18th century, Jammu kingdom was fragmented by Sikh and internal power struggles and became a part of Sikh Empire. The fort eventually came into the hands of Mian Diwan Singh, a high official (Mian) of Jammu. In 1815 Maharaja Ranjit Singh of Lahore intervened and arrested Diwan Singh, by sending him to prison at Lahore and annexed Reasi and Bhimgarh. In turn, Ranjit Singh transferred control of the fort and its lands to his loyal subordinate Gulab Singh, later Maharaja of Jammu and Kashmir. Gulab Singh promptly appointed his Diwan (minister) Amir Chand to restore the fort. In 1817 Diwan Amir Chand began a comprehensive reconstruction of Bhimgarh Fort. He brought in skilled masons from Himachal Pradesh and Punjab and employed local labor to rebuild the walls in stone. During this restoration, Gulab Singh’s son Bhup Singh rescued him from Lahore and launched an attack on Reasi. However, General Zorawar Singh (Dogra general) was left in charge of defending Bhimgarh and successfully repelled Bhup Singh’s assault.

After these events, Bhimgarh Fort remained under Dogra rule. The Dogra monarchs of Jammu & Kashmir used the fort as an armory and treasury. Maharaja Ranbir Singh, ruled from 1856 to 1885 and his successor Pratap Singh stored their weapons and state treasury here. In the early 20th century, during the reign of Maharaja Hari Singh (r. 1925–1947), an English political officer ordered that the armory at Bhimgarh be dismantled. The stored arms were destroyed and the treasury was moved to Jammu city.

Following Indian independence, Bhimgarh Fort fell into disuse. In 1989 the Government of Jammu and Kashmir formally took over the site by placing it under the State Archaeology Department. The next year, the Vaishno Devi Shrine Board (Vaishno Devi Sthapna Board) financed and carried out renovations, adding pathways and gardens.

== Architecture and Layout ==
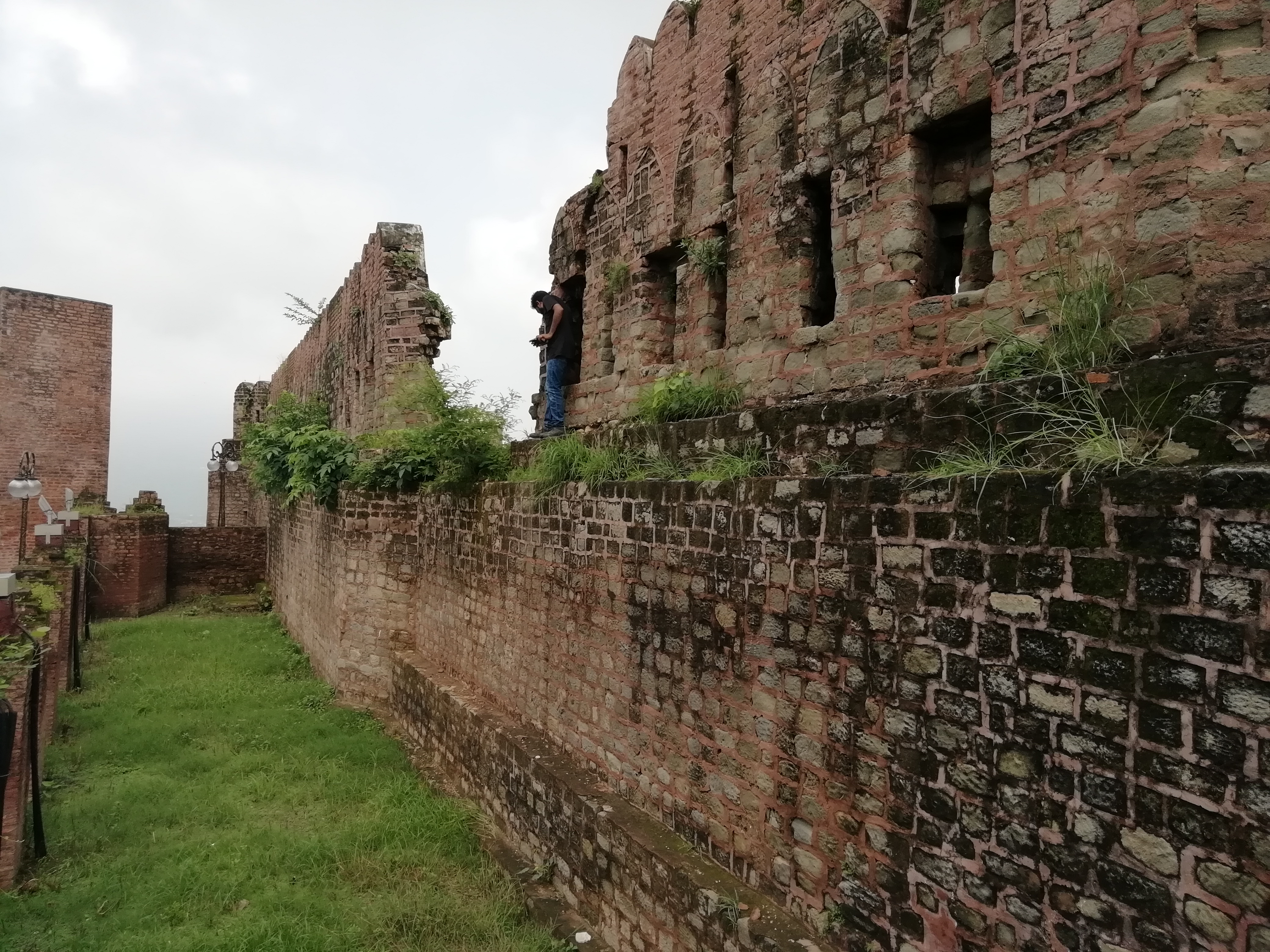
Fort walls

Bhimgarh Fort adapted hill-fort construction for its rugged terrain. The fort does not follow a simple geometric plan, instead its walls and structures snake along the hilltop. The external rampart runs roughly 50 meters in length and about 1 meter thick. It is made of stone masonry and adorned with defensive features such as arrow-slits for archers. According to local tradition, the design was modeled on that of the 24 (Chittorgarh type) Rajput forts of Rajasthan, reflecting the influence of Rajput architecture. The fort’s entrance is through a sequence of three gates. The outer gate is about 2.5 meters high and 1.5 meters wide, carved in a Rajasthani style and originally painted with inscriptions in the Rajasthani language. Passing through the outer gate, a visitor enters a first courtyard of dimensions 7 by 5 meters. The second gate is slightly larger with 4 meters high and 2.5 meters wide. Beyond this is a long open space of 30 by 5 meters, leading to an inner gate measuring roughly 5 meters high by 2.5 meters wide. Statues of the Hindu deities Hanuman and Mahakali stand on either side of the inner gate, indicating the martial and spiritual ethos of the fort. Each gate’s design with overhanging balconies and carved wood was intended both to impress and to defend. Four massive bastions (burjs) anchor the fort’s corners, providing enfilading fire along the walls. These battlemented towers are polygonal (octagonal in parts) and pierced with arrow-slits to allow defenders to fire on attackers. Thick buttresses project from the walls for extra support against bombardment. Inside the ramparts, a network of chambers and passages served the garrison. There are numerous small rooms of various sizes, some roofed and some open to the sky, which were used for soldier quarters and stores. Many such rooms include built-in niches or shelves for storing weapons and equipment.

On the southern side of the fort is a distinctive pavilion (baradari) with twelve doorways opening to the surroundings. This elevated gallery offers panoramic views of Reasi and the Chenab valley. Beneath this baradari stands the temple of Bhim Devta. Inside are stone idols of Bhim (with horned crown and trident) and Arjun (draped in a long chola). Lotus motifs on the temple roof recall those of medieval temples in Balapora (Jammu), and a statue of Ganesh stands near one entrance. The temple complex suggests that the builders deliberately fused martial and religious symbolism, even as soldiers prepared for defense, they kept a shrine to strengthen morale and seek divine protection. Adjoining the temple is a stone water tank or pond, which once collected rainwater for use by the garrison. A steep path with steps was led up from the town to the fort gate. Later, a concrete staircase was built and a footpath (about 150 meters in elevation gain) passes through landscaped gardens to the main entrance. Inside the fort, narrow stairways and ramps connect the different levels, allowing soldiers to move quickly between the outer walls, inner quarters, and the summit point.

== Military and Strategic Role ==
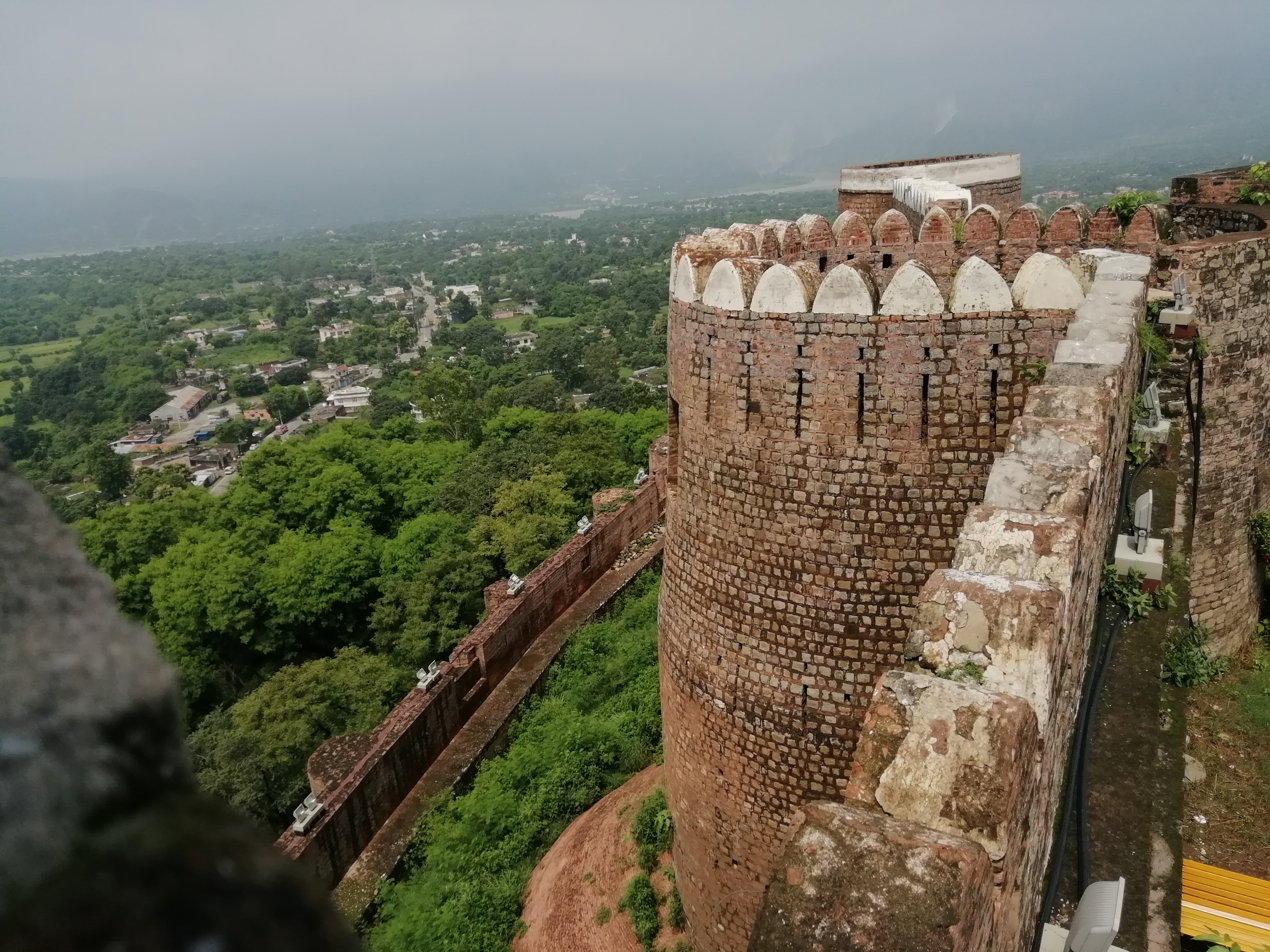
Bastions of the Fort

Bhimgarh Fort was sited foremost for defense and strategic control. Its hilltop position above Reasi town, encircled by watercourses, afforded it natural defenses. To the south and west, the Anji Nallah and Chenab River form steep barriers; to the north and east, the Salal foothills rise nearby. A State Times history notes that "like most forts in Kashmir [it] was surrounded by water on three sides," making it an ideal refuge.

The fort’s defense system (gates, bastions, loopholed walls) allowed a relatively small garrison to hold off larger forces. For instance, when Mian Bhup Singh attacked in 1817, Zorawar’s defense of the partially rebuilt fort gave Gulab Singh time to send reinforcements. After Gulab Singh’s victory and eventual rule over Kashmir, Bhimgarh remained one of the key posts securing the Dogra kingdom’s western flank. In peacetime it served as a secure arsenal (armory and treasury). Maharaja Hari Singh’s English advisers later deemed the fort sufficient as a defensive structure and thus ordered its armaments destroyed to prevent them falling into enemies' hands. Within regional conflicts of the 18th–19th centuries, Bhimgarh played a defined military role. Under Gulab Singh’s rule, it served as an emergency fortress and armory for the Dogra state. It became one of several forts where the royal family could retreat if necessary. By placing General Zorawar Singh in command of Bhimgarh in 1817, Gulab Singh effectively stationed a capable leader to oversee Jammu’s northern frontier. Zorawar Singh later used Bhimgarh as a staging area in his famous campaigns into Ladakh and beyond. Chroniclers credit Bhimgarh as the launching point for some of Zorawar’s early actions against Afghan and Tibetan forces, underscoring its strategic importance for forward operations into the Himalayas.

== Cultural Significance ==
As a heritage monument, Bhimgarh Fort symbolizes Jammu’s past. Commentators note that it stands as one of “the few forts of Jammu which have survived centuries of conflict and still inspire awe”. It is often cited as tangible evidence of Jammu’s “heroic past” under Rajput and Dogra rulers. In modern times, Bhimgarh Fort has become an integral part of Jammu tourism. Described as one of the major attractions in Reasi district. The site was a "state-protected monument" in 1989 (SRO-336) acknowledged its significance in Jammu and Kashmir’s heritage. Structurally, portions of Bhimgarh Fort are in disrepair. The outer walls and bastions have withstood the centuries, but some inner chambers have collapsed or eroded. News reports note that the fort sustained damage during earthquakes and has suffered from general neglect.
