= Baba Dhansar =

Hindu temple

Coordinates: 33.027°N 74.871°E

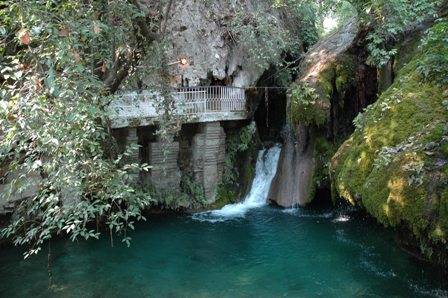
Baba Dhansar

The holy place of Baba Dhansar is located at Karua Jheel (pond) near village Karua, 17 km from Reasi towards Katra in Reasi district of Jammu & Kashmir State, India. The approach involves a walk of 200 metres from the road. It is a belief that when Lord Shiva went to the Amarnath cave to tell Parvati the story of his immortality, he left his serpent king, Sheshnag at Anantnag. Shesh Nag came in the human form as Vasudev. One of the sons of Vasudev was Dhansar who was a saintly person.

As the local belief goes, in the ancient times there was a demon who lived near Karua Jheel (lake) and committed atrocities on the people of village Karua. The villagers sought help of Baba Dhansar to get rid of the Demon. It is believed that Baba Dhansar prayed to Lord Shiva for help. Lord Shiva arrived and helped in killing the Demon. The temple of Baba Dhansar and a cave of Lord Shiva near Karua Jheel has become a place of worship. Karua Jheel is considered sacred where bathing is not permitted. However, the devotees may take a bath downstream. People believe that their wishes are fulfilled if they take bath in the stream and pray with complete faith. A large number of devotees visit the place every year on the day of Mahashivratri when an annual fete (mela) is organized. The place is hometown of actor Sumit Raina

== Photo gallery ==
Nag temple at Baba Dhansar

Sacrificial stones at baba Dhansar
