= Panjah =

- village in tehsil Kalakote
- Interactive map of Panjah
- Location in Jammu and Kashmir, India Panjah (India)
- Coordinates: 33°10′48″N 74°25′12″E
- Country: India
- Union Territory: Jammu and Kashmir
- District: Rajouri
- Tehsil: Kalakote

Government
  - Type: Democratic
  - Body: Panchayat Raj

Area
  - Total: 3.23 km^{2} (1.25 sq mi)

Population (2011)
  - Total: 756
  - Density: 234/km^{2} (606/sq mi)

Languages
  - Official: Urdu
  - Spoken: Urdu, Hindi, Dogri, Gujari, Pahari & English

Demographics
  - Literacy: 54.10%
  - Sex ratio: 944
- Time zone: UTC+5:30 (IST)
- PIN: 185201
- Vehicle registration: JK11

Panjah is one of 69 villages of tehsil Kalakote of Rajouri district of Jammu region in the Indian union territory of Jammu and Kashmir.

== Administration ==
As per constitution of India and Panchyati Raj Act, Panjah village is administrated by Sarpanch (Head of Village) who is elected representative of village. Elections for Panchayat held after every 5 years.

== History ==
Panjah was administrated by district Noweshra during 1960 but after that district status snatched by Noweshra and given to Rajouri and Noweshra became an eponymous tehsil with Kalakote region under it. But during 1970s Kalakote got tehsil status and is governing Panjah since then.

== Geography ==
Panjah is located at 33.18°N 74.41°E. Its area is 3.23 km sq. It has an average elevation of 700 m (2,300 ft). Panjah has a humid subtropical, dry climate. Its yearly temperature is 28.16 °C (82.69 °F) and it is 2.19% higher than India's averages. It typically receives about 22.15 millimeters (0.87 inches) of precipitation and has 28.48 rainy days (7.8% of the time) annually. Pincode of Panjah is 185201.

== Population ==
As of 2011 India census, the location code of Kalakote is 001531. Panjah has a total population of 756 peoples, out of which male population is 389 while female population is 367. Literacy rate of Panjah is 54.10% out of which 59.90% are males and 40.10% are females. There are about 185 houses in Panjah.

Sex Ratio of village
Sex	Percent
Male	51.45%
Female	48.55%

== Religion ==
Majority of village population is Hindu. About 63.36% of population is Hindu and 36.64% are Muslims.

Religion in Panjah
Religion	Percent
Hindu	63.36%
Muslim	36.64%

== Education ==
As of 2022, Panjah has only two schools. Government Middle School Panjah is only government school of village while Hidden Treasure Public School is only private school. There is no high school in Panjah. Students have to travel to Kalakote for their higher education. From a long time, people have high demand for promoting Government Middle School Panjah to Government High School Panjah, so that students can complete their matric education inter village.

== Healthcare ==
Panjah has its own hospital but as of now it is not fully functional. Also, nearest hospital CHC Kalakote is not recommended for emergencies. For medical emergencies some have to go to GMC Rajouri which is around 36 km away or GMC Jammu which is around 107 km away.

== Transport ==
Nearest Bus Station to village is at Kalakote. A 22 Kilometre single lane road that connects Kalakote town with National Highway at Siot pass through village which is main route of transportation. The nearest railway station to Panjah is Jammu Tawi railway station which is located at a distance of 108 kilometres from the village and is a 3.5 hr drive. Rajouri Airport is located 36 km from the village but currently is non-operational. The nearest airport to Panjah is Jammu Airport which located 109 kilometres from village and is a 3.5 hr drive.

== Tourism ==
Mata Kali Mandir, temple of Kali, is one tourism draw in the village. The temple contains a statue of Kali as well as a six foot long statue of Lord Hanuman.

Symbal Devta, a tree in Panjah, is another tourist attraction. The tree who is believed to be a god by residents of Panjah and nearby villages. It is believed that this god will fulfil all their wishes in this location, and every year hundreds of Yagya and Havna are done there.
