= Chowdhary Zulfkar Ali =

Indian politician

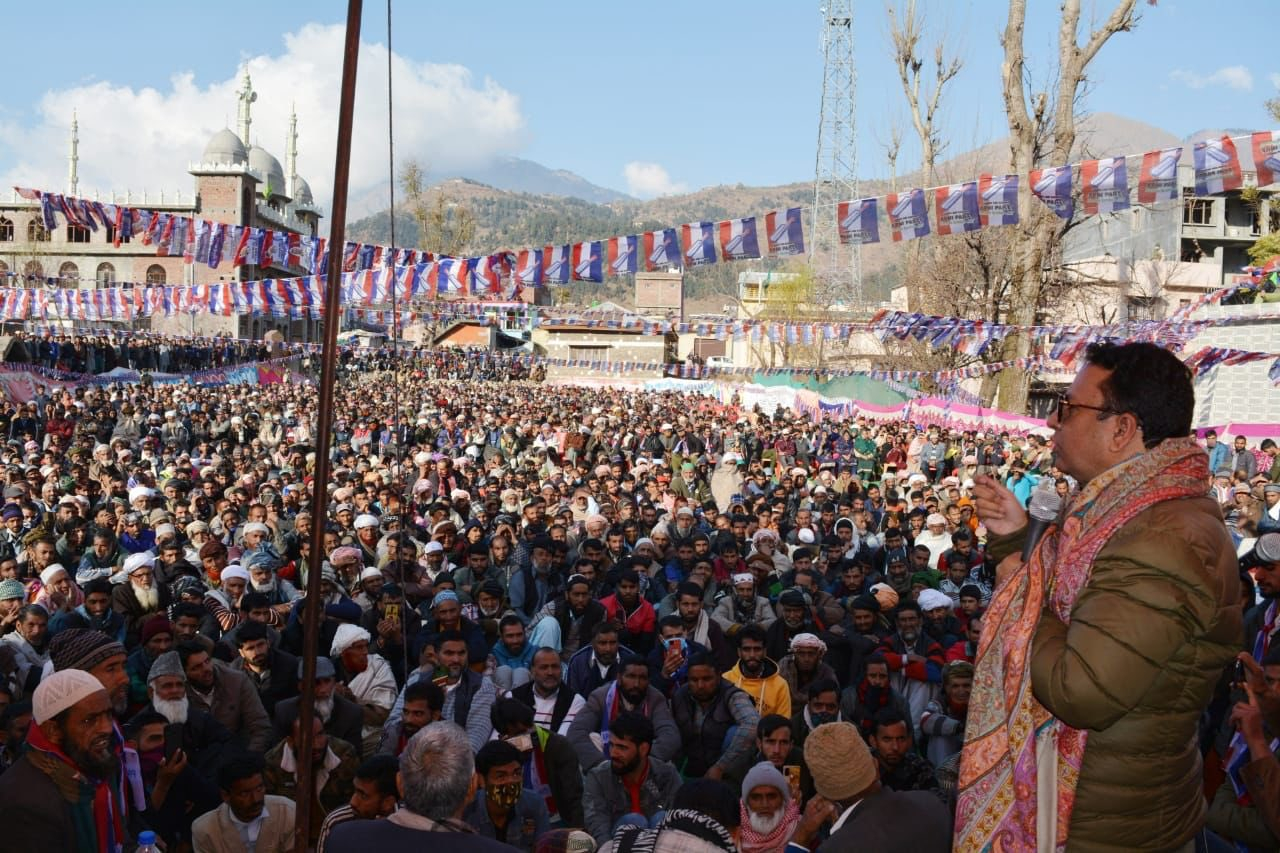
- Chowdhary Zulfkar Ali in Kotranka, Rajouri

MLA Darhal
- In office 2008–2014
- Preceded by: Thakur Puran Singh
- Succeeded by: Constituency abolished
- Constituency: Darhal

Vice President J&K Apni Party

MLA Darhal
- In office 2014 – 2018 November
- Succeeded by: Governor's Rule

Cabinet Minister J&K Government, India

Personal details
- Born: 1 January 1970 Sunderbani, India
- Party: Bharatiya Janata Party
- Other political affiliations: Jammu and Kashmir National Conference (1996–2002); Jammu and Kashmir Peoples Democratic Party (2003–2020)
- Spouse: Zubeida
- Children: 4
- Parent(s): Chowdhary Mohmmad Hussain; Gulam Fatima (mother)
- Relatives: Chowdhary Shafiq Ahmad (brother); Showkat Ali Chowdhary (brother) (Indian Forest Service)
- Education: LL.M; M.B.A.
- Alma mater: Jammu University; Prince of Wales college
- Occupation: Politician

Chowdhary Zulfkar Ali is an Indian politician and former cabinet minister of Jammu and Kashmir. He is an advocate by profession and was a member of the 11th and 12th Jammu and Kashmir Legislative Assembly from Darhal constituency. He has also served as Cabinet Minister from 2015 to 2018. He was also associated with Jammu and Kashmir Peoples Democratic Party and served as district chief of the party for district Rajouri 2003 to 2013. He resigned from the PDP and became one of the founding member of Jammu and Kashmir Apni Party. Formerly, Vice President of the party, in August 2024, he joined BJP.

== Early life and education ==
Zulfkar was born on 1 January 1970 at Sunderbani town, Rajouri district to a bureaucrat turned politician Chowdhary Mohmmad Hussain, who belongs to a feudal Zaildar family of the district Rajouri who was a member of Jammu and Kashmir Legislative assembly for 5 terms.

Zulfkar did early schooling from MIER Jammu and Graduation from Prince of Wales College Jammu and bachelors in law and masters in law from University of Jammu and masters in business administration (MBA) from IGNOU. He also did a post-graduate diploma course in Journalism and mass communication, industrial relation personal management, human resources development, business administration and rural development.

== Political career ==
Zulfkar was active in politics as a student leader and was a president of the student union in University of Jammu. His father was associated with Jammu & Kashmir National Conference, which he joined after completing his education where he became a zonal president of the youth wing. In 2002, he was denied a ticket by the National Conference from the Darhal constituency, and he contested it as a rebel National Conference candidate, losing with a narrow margin. On 5 January 2003, he joined Jammu and Kashmir Peoples Democratic Party and became the district president, a position he held for a decade. In the 2008 general election, he again stood from Darhal and was elected to the 11th J&K legislative assembly from 2008 to 2014.

He served as a member of the Public Accounts Committee, estimates committee, public undertakings committee, subordinate legislation committee, environment committee etc. and also served as chairman of the Ethics Committee, Subordinate Legislation Committee, and Brick Kiln committee.

In the 2014 general election, he had been reelected to the 12th Jammu and Kashmir legislative assembly and was inducted as a cabinet minister in the PDP-BJP coalition government and was re-inducted as the cabinet minister. In 2024 general election, he contested as a BJP candidate from Budhal Assembly constituency but lost to Jammu & Kashmir National Conference candidate Javid Iqbal

=== Positions held ===
1. Cabinet Minister for Food Civil Supplies and Consumer Affairs
2. Cabinet Minister for Tribal Affairs Department (Pioneer Minister)
3. Cabinet Minister for Information and Public Relations Department
4. Cabinet Minister for Haj and Aquaf Department
5. Cabinet Minister for Education Department
6. Chairman of State Consumer Council
7. Chairman of Ethics Committee
8. Chairman of Subordinate Legislation Committee
9. Chairman of Brick Kiln Committee (Environment Committee)

== Personal life ==
Chowdhary Zulfkar Ali is married to Zubeida, daughter of politician Haji Buland Khan who also served as a member of Jammu and Kashmir Legislative assembly and council.

His two brothers-in-Law Ajaz Ahmed Khan and Mumtaz Ahmed Khan were members of Jammu & Kashmir Legislative Assembly.
