= Government Degree College, Kalakote =

College in Rajouri, Jammu

Government Degree College Kalakote
- Other name: GDC Kalakote
- Motto: Character is Supreme
- Type: Government
- Established: 2011
- Academic affiliations: University of Jammu
- Location: Kalakote, Jammu and Kashmir, 185202, India; 33°12′36.86″N 74°25′8.9″E
- Campus: 5 acres (2.0 ha); Rural
- Language: Hindi
- Website: https://gdckalakote.in/

Government Degree College Kalakote (GDC Kalakote) is a government run educational college located in the Kalakote town of Rajouri district in the Indian union territory of Jammu and Kashmir. It is affiliated with Jammu University and is recognised by the University Grants Commission.

== History ==
On June 30, 2011, Jammu and Kashmir government has approved setting up of 22 new degree colleges in the state (now UT). The degree colleges were purposed to set up under the centrally sponsored scheme Establishment of Model Degree Colleges in Educationally Backward districts.

== Academics ==
The college offers Bachelor of Arts and Bachelor of Science degrees in various subjects. There are total of 161 students and 8 teachers in college. Many camps, conferences and awareness programs also organized for students.

== Campus ==
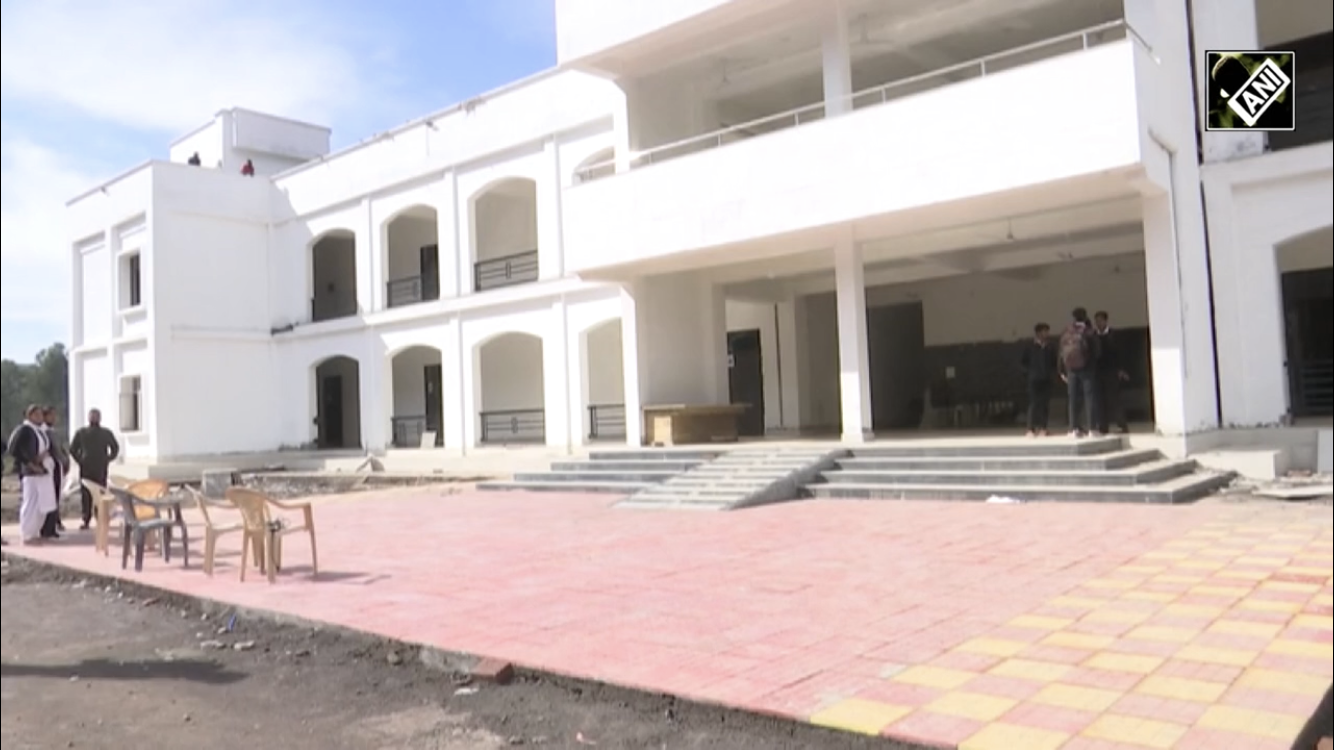
GDC Kalakote new campus

The old campus of GDC Kalakote was inside the campus of Government Higher Secondary School Kalakote and was functioning with only three rooms. In 2023, classes were moved to the newly built campus at Chainpur village about 2 km away from old campus. The new campus is a two-floor building with classrooms, library, computer lab and some open area for sports and other activities.

== See also ==
- Kalakote
- Thermal Power Plant Kalakote
- Kalakote Assembly constituency
