= Chowdhary Mohmmad Hussain =

Indian politician

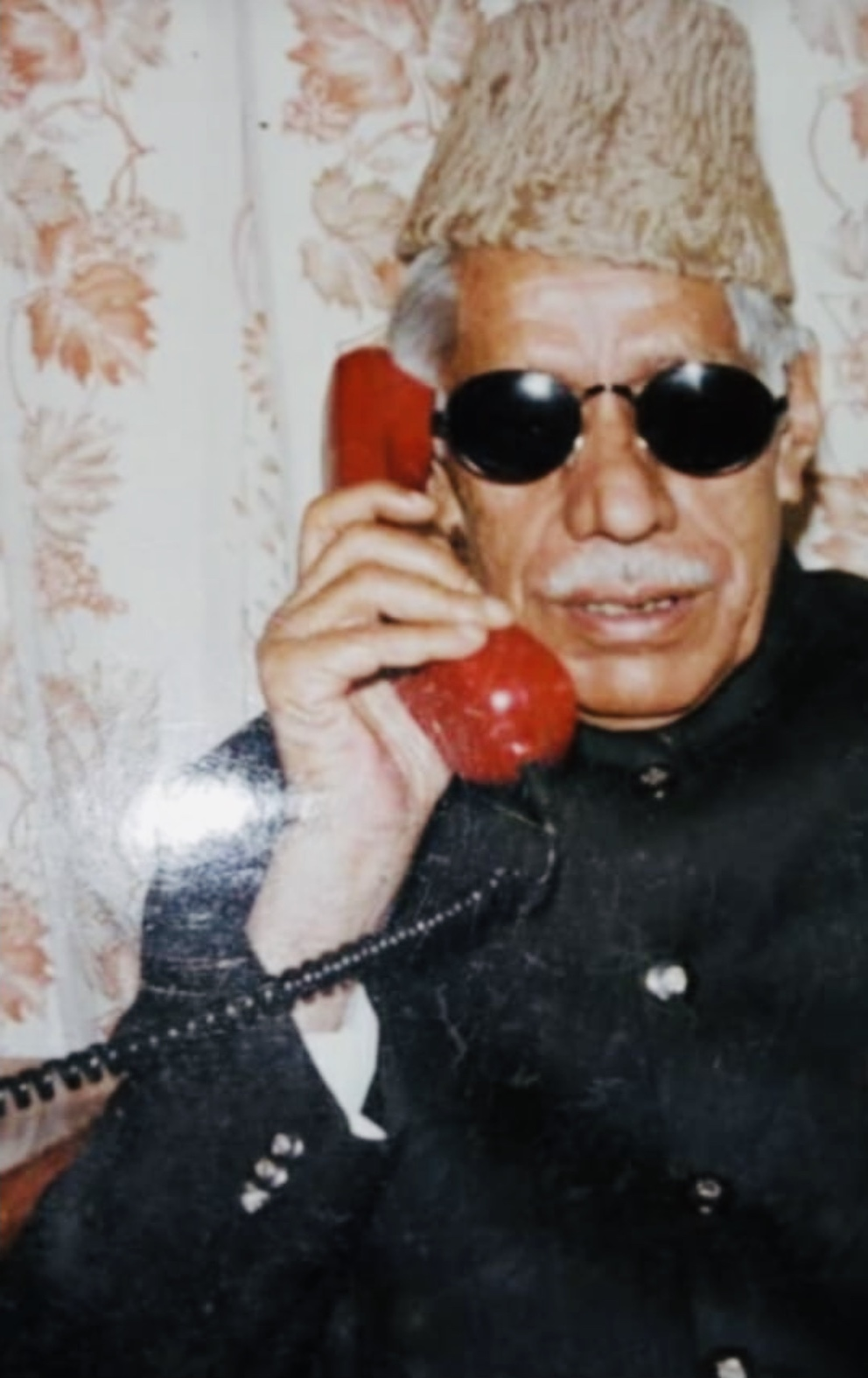
- Hussain in his office in Jammu

Minister of Revenue, Relief and rehabilitation, Rural development and Panchayati Raj, Jammu and Kashmir
- In office 1977-1983
- Preceded by: Mirza Mohd. Iqbal
- Succeeded by: Mirza Abdul Rashid
- Constituency: Darhal
- In office 2000-2002

Member of the Jammu and Kashmir Legislative Assembly
- In office 1967–1996
- Succeeded by: Mirza Abdul Rashid
- Constituency: Darhal
- In office 1977–1996
- Preceded by: Mirza Abdul Rashid
- Succeeded by: Bashir Ahmed
- In office 1987–2002
- Preceded by: Bashir Ahmed
- Succeeded by: Thakur Puran Singh

Personal details
- Born: 1 January 1929 Sunderbani, Rajouri district, British India
- Died: 30 September 2002 (aged 73)
- Party: Jammu and Kashmir National Conference
- Other political affiliations: Indian National Congress (1967-1975)
- Children: 6 including Chowdhary Zulfkar Ali (Former Cabinet Minister J&K Govt.) & Showkat Ali Chowdhary (IFS)
- Education: Lahore University

Chowdhary Mohmmad Hussain was an Indian politician and bureaucrat. He was part of 4th, 6th, 8th and 9th Jammu and Kashmir state Legislative assembly (Vidhan Sabha). He represented the Darhal Vidhan Sabha constituency of Rajouri district of erstwhile State of Jammu and Kashmir 5 times.

== Early life ==
He was born in 1929 to Buland Khan in the Dhakkar clan of Muslim Gujjars. His forefathers had migrated from Gujrat and settled in various regions of Jammu and Kashmir. His grandfather, Khokhar Khan, had two sons named Buland Khan and Misri Khan, and he had settled in the village of Bain Hills Sikri in Sunderbani town of Rajouri district, Kashmir.

== Political career ==
He was first elected as MLA from this seat, on the mandate of Indian national congress in 1967 and 1969 (bi elections). He remained district chief of the INC for a long period. In 1972 he was denied the mandate by the INC, In 1975 he joined Jammu and Kashmir national conference headed by Sheikh Mohmmed Abdullah. In 1977 he contested the elections from the same vidhan sabha seat on the mandate of Jammu and Kashmir National Conference and was elected for 3rd time to the Vidhan Sabha. He was inducted in the council of ministers of Sheikh Mohmmed Abdullah. In 1983 he lost the elections to INC candidate and veteran spiritual Gujjar leader with a very thin margin. In 1987, elections to Jammu and Kashmir legislative assembly, he was again elected (4th time) to represent this constituency.

Again, in 1996 elected to vidhan sabha for (5th time), and was again inducted in the council of ministers headed by Dr Farooq Abdullah which he held till his death 30 September 2002.

He also served as Block Development Officer from 1957 to 1967. As a minister he headed the revenue, relief and rehabilitation, rural development and Panchayati Raj cooperatives departments etc. His younger son Chowdhary Zulfkar Ali also represents Darhal (Vidhan Sabha) in 11th and 12th Assemblies and was a cabinet minister in the Mufti Mohommad Sayeed and Mehbooba Mufti Governments.

== Death ==
He died on 30 September 2002, while holding the position of Minister in the Farooq Abdullah-led government.
