= Manawar Tawi River =

River in India and Pakistan

Manawar Tawi River Rajouri Tawi, Naushera Tawi
- Location of the mouth Manawar Tawi River (India)

Location
- Countries: India and Pakistan
- Provinces: Jammu and Kashmir, Punjab
- Districts: Rajouri, Jammu, Sialkot

Physical characteristics
- Source
  - location: Pir Panjal Range
  - coordinates: 33.57057°N 74.33887°E
- Mouth
  - location: Chenab River
  - coordinates: 32.6936°N 74.4868°E

Basin features
- River system: Indus River

The Manawar Tawi river (also called Rajouri Tawi and Naushera Tawi) . It is called Manawar Tawi because it was named after Pakistan Commando Major Malik Munawar Khan Awan ,who operated the area during 1965 Operation Gibraltor.It is a tributary of the Chenab River, which originates at the Ratan Pir ridge of the Pir Panjal Range and flows through the Rajouri and Jammu districts of Jammu and Kashmir, administered by India and the Sialkot District of Pakistani Punjab, where it joins the Chenab at Marala Headworks. The towns along its course include Thana Mandi, Rajouri and Naushera. Towards the end of its course, it flows through the plains of the Jammu district west of Akhnoor close to the Line of Control dividing the Pakistani-administered Kashmir and Indian-administered Kashmir regions.

== See also ==
- Tawi River
