= Sheetal Nanda =

Indian Administrative Service officer from Jammu and Kashmir

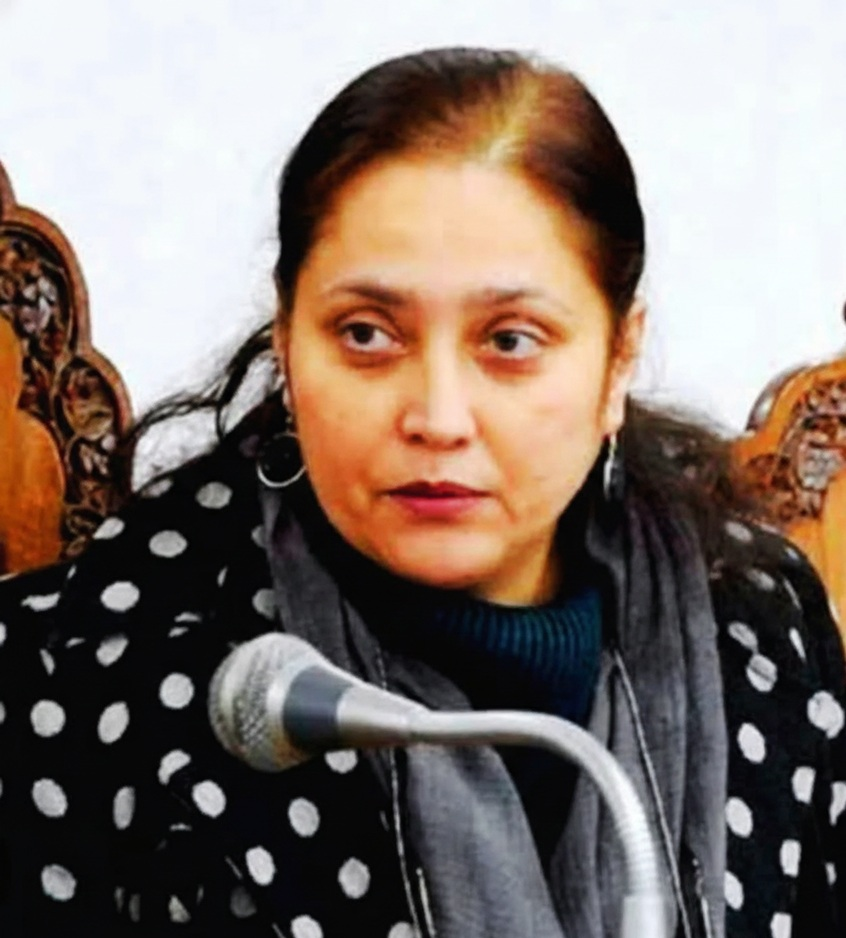
- Sheetal Nanda in 2020
- Born: Jammu (1975); Jammu, Jammu and Kashmir, India
- Education: University of Jammu
- Organization: Indian Administrative Service
- Awards: Prime Minister’s Award for Excellence in Public Administration in 2019.

Sheetal Nanda is a senior Indian civil servant of the AGMUT cadre (Arunachal Pradesh–Goa–Mizoram and Union Territories). She secured 43rd rank in the Civil Services Examination (CSE) 2006, marking the beginning of career in public administration. She currently serves as the Commissioner/Secretary to the Government, Forest, Ecology & Environment Department, Jammu and Kashmir. In recognition of her exemplary service and impactful leadership, Sheetal Nanda was honoured in 2022 with the Prime Minister's Award for Excellence in Public Administration, 2019, under the Innovation (General) category.

== Early life ==
Born on September,7th in 1975, in Jammu, Jammu and Kashmir, she holds a B.Com and MBA degree from University of Jammu. Proficient in English and Hindi, Nanda brings her expertise and experience to her current role, contributing significantly to the governance and administration of the region.

== Career ==
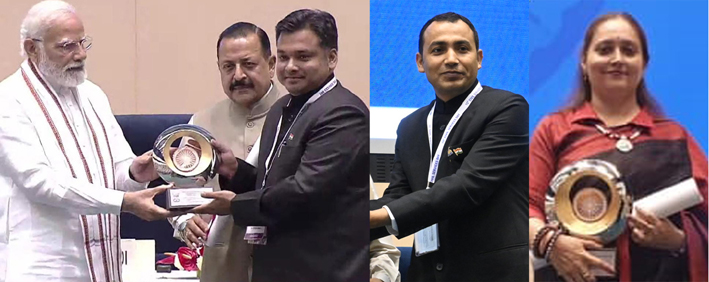
Prime Minister's award to Sheetal Nanda in Public Administration

She began her administrative career in August 2008 as Sub-Divisional Magistrate (SDM) under the Land Revenue Management and District Administration cadre. Serving in the Junior Scale until October 2010. From October 2010 to July 2012, Sheetal Nanda served as Additional Deputy Commissioner, Jammu. In July 2012, she transitioned to the Civil Secretariat as Additional Secretary to the Government in the Power Department, a position she held until February 2014. Her next assignment, from February 2014 to January 2015, was as managing director (Medical), Jammu, under the Health & Family Welfare/Medical Services cadre. From January 2015 to March 2018 Sheetal Nanda's appointment as District Magistrate of Samba District.

In March 2018, she was posted as Secretary in the Rural Development Department, where she served until 16 March 2021. Later she was posted in Social Welfare Department.From December 2024, Sheetal Nanda,has been serving as Commissioner/Secretary to the Forest, Ecology and Environment Department, Union Territory of Jammu and Kashmir
