= Tatta Pani =

Tatta Pani may refer to:

- Tatta Pani, Azad Kashmir, a town and springs of Azad Kashmir
- Tatta Pani, Gilgit Baltistan, a village in Gilgit Baltistan
- Tattapani (Himachal Pradesh), a village in Himachal Pradesh
- Tatta Pani, Kalakote, a town and spring in Jammu and Kashmir
