= Darhal Assembly constituency =

Constituency of the Jammu and Kashmir legislative assembly in India

Coordinates: 33.485°N 74.413°E

Darhal Malkan
- Former constituency for the Jammu and Kashmir Legislative Assembly

Constituency details
- Country: India
- State: Jammu and Kashmir
- District: Rajouri
- Established: 1967
- Abolished: 2018

Darhal was a legislative constituency in the Jammu and Kashmir Legislative Assembly of Jammu and Kashmir a north state of India. Darhal Malkan was also part of Jammu Lok Sabha constituency.

== Members of the Legislative Assembly ==
Election	Member	Party
1962	Mohammed Iqbal Mirza	Jammu & Kashmir National Conference
1967	Chowdhary Mohmmad Hussain	Indian National Congress
1972	Abdul Rashid Mirza	Indian National Congress
1977	Chowdhary Mohmmad Hussain	Jammu & Kashmir National Conference
1983	Bashir Ahmed	Indian National Congress
1987	Chowdhary Mohmmad Hussain	Jammu & Kashmir National Conference
1996	Chowdhary Mohmmad Hussain	Jammu & Kashmir National Conference
2002	Thakur Puran Singh	Independent politician
2008	Chowdhary Zulfkar Ali	Jammu and Kashmir People's Democratic Party
2014	Chowdhary Zulfkar Ali	Jammu and Kashmir People's Democratic Party

== Election results ==
=== Assembly Election 2014 ===
2014 Jammu and Kashmir Legislative Assembly election : Darhal
Party	Candidate	Votes	%	±%
JKPDP	Chowdhary Zulfkar Ali	24,381	31.58%	▲3.03
JKNC	Chowdhary Liaqat Ali	19,313	25.01%	▲3.66
INC	Mohammed Iqbal Malik	18,605	24.10%	▲5.69
BJP	Thakur Puran Singh	11,940	15.46%	▲13.89
Independent	Nazir Hussain	656	0.85%	New
Independent	Manir Hussain	645	0.84%	New
NOTA	None of the Above	475	0.62%	New
Margin of victory		5,068	6.56%	▼0.12
Turnout		77,213	82.45%	▲5.09
Registered electors		93,646		▲6.62
JKPDP hold		Swing	▲3.03	

=== Assembly Election 2008 ===
2008 Jammu and Kashmir Legislative Assembly election : Darhal
Party	Candidate	Votes	%	±%
JKPDP	Chowdhary Zulfkar Ali	19,399	28.55%	▲16.33
Independent	Mohammed Iqbal Malik	14,858	21.87%	New
JKNC	Chowdhary Liaqat Ali	14,510	21.35%	▼6.23
INC	Thakur Puran Singh	12,506	18.40%	▲12.98
Independent	Masood Ahmed Chowdhary	1,753	2.58%	New
Independent	Abdul Hamid	1,532	2.25%	New
JKNPP	Mohammed Farooq	1,140	1.68%	▼1.13
BJP	Dev Raj Sharma	1,072	1.58%	▼0.59
Margin of victory		4,541	6.68%	▲6.17
Turnout		67,952	77.37%	▲30.76
Registered electors		87,831		▼2.79
JKPDP gain from Independent		Swing	▲0.45	

=== Assembly Election 2002 ===
2002 Jammu and Kashmir Legislative Assembly election : Darhal
Party	Candidate	Votes	%	±%
Independent	Thakur Puran Singh	11,832	28.09%	New
JKNC	Chowdhary Liaqat Ali	11,615	27.58%	▼13.33
Independent	Chowdhary Zulfkar Ali	7,870	18.69%	New
JKPDP	Tasadiqe Hussain	5,146	12.22%	New
INC	Ahssain Ullah Pervaize Malik	2,285	5.43%	▼16.76
JKNPP	Mushtaq Hussain	1,181	2.80%	New
BJP	Dev Raj Sharma	911	2.16%	▼5.99
BSP	Zulifkar Hussain	805	1.91%	New
Independent	Abdul Khaliq	470	1.12%	New
Margin of victory		217	0.52%	▼13.60
Turnout		42,115	46.61%	▼8.00
Registered electors		90,353		▲34.85
Independent gain from JKNC		Swing	▼12.81	

=== Assembly Election 1996 ===
1996 Jammu and Kashmir Legislative Assembly election : Darhal
Party	Candidate	Votes	%	±%
JKNC	Chowdhary Mohmmad Hussain	14,969	40.91%	▼23.43
Independent	Abdul Rashid Mirza	9,803	26.79%	New
INC	Tassdiq Hussain	8,119	22.19%	New
BJP	Dev Raj Sharma	2,982	8.15%	▲2.83
JD	Ghulam Abbas	506	1.38%	New
Margin of victory		5,166	14.12%	▼19.97
Turnout		36,593	55.41%	▼20.29
Registered electors		67,002		▲12.48
JKNC hold		Swing	▼23.43	

=== Assembly Election 1987 ===
1987 Jammu and Kashmir Legislative Assembly election : Darhal
Party	Candidate	Votes	%	±%
JKNC	Chowdhary Mohmmad Hussain	28,707	64.34%	▲31.02
Independent	Mohammed Sadiq Malik	13,496	30.25%	New
BJP	Kuldeep Raj Gupta	2,375	5.32%	▲2.34
Margin of victory		15,211	34.09%	▲27.08
Turnout		44,620	75.78%	▲7.31
Registered electors		59,568		▲20.87
JKNC gain from INC		Swing		

=== Assembly Election 1983 ===
1983 Jammu and Kashmir Legislative Assembly election : Darhal
Party	Candidate	Votes	%	±%
INC	Bashir Ahmed	13,435	40.33%	▲16.42
JKNC	Chowdhary Mohmmad Hussain	11,100	33.32%	▼24.62
Independent	Mohammed Sadiq Malik	7,345	22.05%	New
BJP	Kuldeep Raj Gupta	993	2.98%	New
Independent	Chooni Lal	288	0.86%	New
Margin of victory		2,335	7.01%	▼27.03
Turnout		33,313	68.84%	▲21.69
Registered electors		49,284		▲14.66
INC gain from JKNC		Swing	▼17.61	

=== Assembly Election 1977 ===
1977 Jammu and Kashmir Legislative Assembly election : Darhal
Party	Candidate	Votes	%	±%
JKNC	Chowdhary Mohmmad Hussain	11,433	57.94%	New
INC	Abdul Rashid Mirza	4,717	23.91%	▼40.18
JP	Nulzar Ahmad	2,629	13.32%	New
Independent	Mohammed Sadiq Malik	953	4.83%	New
Margin of victory		6,716	34.04%	▲0.66
Turnout		19,732	46.90%	▼19.44
Registered electors		42,982		▲6.84
JKNC gain from INC		Swing	▼6.14	

=== Assembly Election 1972 ===
1972 Jammu and Kashmir Legislative Assembly election : Darhal
Party	Candidate	Votes	%	±%
INC	Abdul Rashid Mirza	16,848	64.08%	▼6.94
Independent	Gulzar Ahmed	8,073	30.71%	New
ABJS	Kuldeep Raj Gupta	1,237	4.71%	▼11.90
Margin of victory		8,775	33.38%	▼21.05
Turnout		26,291	66.66%	▲8.45
Registered electors		40,231		▲24.40
INC hold		Swing		

=== Assembly Election 1967 ===
1967 Jammu and Kashmir Legislative Assembly election : Darhal
Party	Candidate	Votes	%	±%
INC	Chowdhary Mohmmad Hussain	13,071	71.03%	New
ABJS	R. Lal	3,055	16.60%	New
Democratic National Conference	G. R. Dar	2,277	12.37%	New
Margin of victory		10,016	54.43%	▲12.39
Turnout		18,403	59.75%	▼25.76
Registered electors		32,341		▲39.59
INC gain from JKNC		Swing		

=== Assembly Election 1962 ===
1962 Jammu and Kashmir Legislative Assembly election : Darhal
Party	Candidate	Votes	%	±%
JKNC	Mohammed Iqbal Mirza	13,601	71.02%	New
PSP	Adbul Rehman	5,550	28.98%	New
Margin of victory		8,051	42.04%	
Turnout		19,151	84.32%	
Registered electors		23,168		
JKNC win (new seat)				
