= Ghari Momin =

- Village
- Country: India
- Union Territory: Jammu and Kashmir
- District: Rajouri

Languages
  - Spoken: English, Hindi, Urdu
- Time zone: UTC+5:30 (IST)

Ghari Momin is a small village, which is connected through Akbarpura town, located in Nowshera, Rajouri district of the Indian union territory of Jammu and Kashmir.
