= 2023 Rajouri attacks =

Terror attack in Rajouri, India

- Part of Kashmir conflict
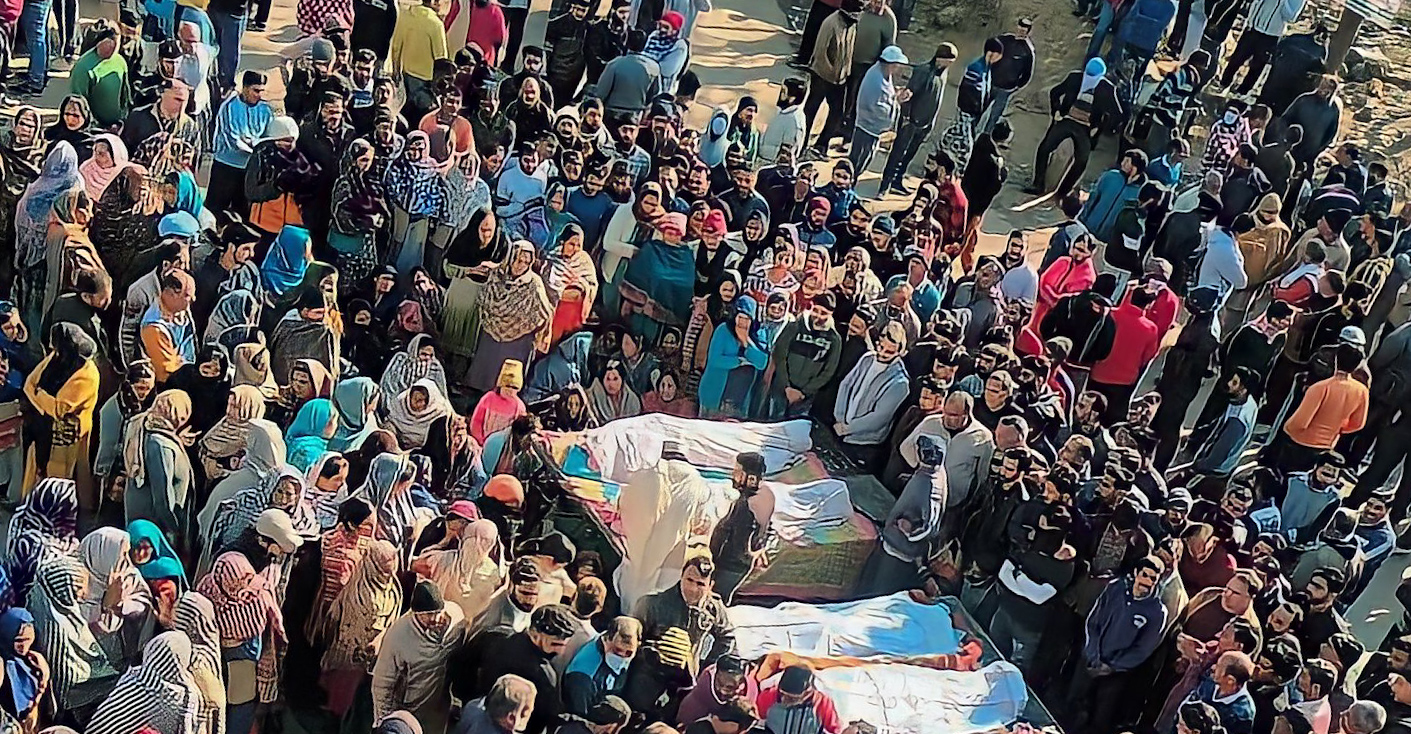
- Last rites of Rajouri attack victims
- Location: Dangri, Jammu & Kashmir, India
- Date: 1–2 January 2023
- Target: Pahari-Hindus
- Attack type: Shooting, explosion
- Weapons: Rifles, improvised explosive device (IED)
- Deaths: 7
- Injuries: 12

The 2023 Rajouri attacks were terrorist attacks that occurred on 1 and 2 January 2023 in the Dangri village of the Rajouri district in the Indian union territory of Jammu and Kashmir. The first attack, a shooting, resulted in the death of four and injured nine others. In the second attack, an IED exploded near the same attack site, resulting in the death of a child at the scene and injuring five others. A second child injured in that blast died from injuries, raising the overall death toll to six. On 8 January 2023, one of the injured succumbed in hospital and the death toll rose to seven.

The regional political parties of Jammu and Kashmir blamed New Delhi's policies for Kashmir and security lapses due to the administration of Lieutenant Governor of the union territory Manoj Sinha for the Rajouri terror attack. Meanwhile, leaders of Bhartiya Janata Party blamed Pakistan for the attack.

The Hurriyat Conference, led by Mirwaiz Umar Farooq, denounced the deaths of innocent civilians in Rajouri. The Resistance Front (TRF), a Kashmiri separatist militant group, which according to Indian claims is a "shadow organisation" of Lashkar-e-Taiba, denied that it was a terror strike.

== Background ==
On 16 December 2022, the Indian Army reportedly killed two civilians while injuring another during firing outside an army camp in the Rajouri district. Eyewitnesses claimed a sentry posted at the entrance opened fire at approaching civilians, causing the casualties, despite the army's statement that some "unidentified terrorists" had opened firing at the camp.

The incident triggered protests by the locals, who demanded a fair probe. After 14 days of the incident, two unidentified gunmen reached Dangri village of Rajouri district and started firing in the residential houses on 1 January 2023.

The incident occurred around 7 p.m. IST, when two unidentified men allegedly entered houses of Hindu residents, checked the victim's Aadhaar identity cards, and then started firing on them with the rifles.

== Attacks ==
=== Shooting ===
On the evening of 1 January 2023 at around 7 p.m., suspected militants broke into at least three houses of a Hindu community in Dangri village in Jammu and Kashmir's border region of Rajouri and opened fire, leaving four civilians dead and six more injured. According to reports, the eyewitnesses claimed that two unidentified men carrying rifles fired upon three residential houses.

Bal Krishan, an armed villager of Dhangri village, scared the unidentified men who had been on a killing spree. Krishan had a weapon that was given to villagers to prevent militancy, and these villagers' groups are known as Village Defense Committees (VDCs), established in the middle of the 1990s. Now, after Krishnan's act of scaring the unidentified gunmen, which has increased pressure in Jammu division to bring back the committees.

=== Explosion ===
On 2 January at 9 a.m., a suspected IED blast near the home of Pritam Sharma, one of the victims of the 1 January Rajouri shooting, injured seven people, mostly children, in which siblings Vihan Sharma and Sanvi were killed. A child was killed on the spot and six others were injured in a blast, including one badly, at one of the militants' target homes just hours after the gun attacks. The improvised explosive device was planned to target senior security officials, according to Jammu and Kashmir Police.

=== Victims ===
The deceased and injured of the 1 January attack in Rajouri were identified. The deceased were Deepak Kumar (23), Satish Kumar (45), Pritam Lal (57), Shiv Pal (32) and the injured: Pawan Kumar (38), Rohit Pandit (27), Saroj Bala (35), Ridham Sharma (17), Sushil Kumar (32). A 16 year old girl who was injured in the blast succumbed to her injuries, raising the death toll to 6. On 2 January 2023, the two killed in the blast were identified as Vihan Kumar (4) and Samiksha Devi (14); the injured were identified as Sanvi Sharma (7), Angel Sharma (8), Kanhaya Sharma (14), Vansh Bhargav (15), Sejal Sharma (18), Sumiksha Sharma (20), Sharda Devi (38), Santosh Sharma (45), and Kamlesh Devi (48).

The mortal remains of six persons, including two minor cousins, slain in twin attacks in Rajouri district were cremated on 3 January 2023 in their native village. On 8 January 2023, one of the injured victims died in hospital, raising the death toll to seven.

=== Police response ===
Mukesh Singh, Additional Director General of Police of the Jammu Zone, said that a search operation was launched in response to the attacks, with the police, Central Reserve Police Force, and army troops cordoning off the area in an effort to neutralize the militants.

On 2 January 2023, the National Investigation Agency was mulling a visit to the site of the terror attack in the Upper Dangri village of Rajouri in accordance with a new modus operandi developed by the agency to examine locations where such terror attacks occur. Jammu and Kashmir Police officials expressed the belief that some recently recruited but well-trained "hybrid terrorists" were responsible for the killings in Rajouri.

== Political reactions ==
Regional J&K parties blamed New Delhi's policies in Kashmir and the administration of Lieutenant Governor (LG) Manoj Sinha for the recent spike in violence in the Union Territory. The politicians from Kashmir denounced the killings in Rajouri and criticised the LG-led government for failing to root out terrorism even after Article 370 had been abrogated for four years. Farooq Abdullah, a former chief minister of J&K, denounced the attacks that occurred on Sunday and Monday and said that terrorists do not distinguish between their victims' religions—whether they are Muslims or Hindus. In the wake of the first attack, Omar Abdullah, vice president of the National Conference, questioned the authorities for allegedly failing to follow the usual operating procedure.

Mehbooba Mufti, the president of the Jammu and Kashmir People's Democratic Party (PDP), also denounced the killings and criticised the Bhartiya Janata Party (BJP) for making "bogus claims" about putting an end to militancy in the region. Mufti urged the people to maintain their sense of brotherhood while accusing the BJP of using the deaths of Hindus for political gain. Tarun Chugh, national general secretary of the BJP, accused Pakistan's ISI of attempting to disrupt the peace in Jammu and Kashmir.

Dr Jaishankar, the minister of external affairs in India, claimed Pakistan was an "epicenter of terror." He condemned Pakistan for allegedly sending terrorism to India while speaking in Vienna, but he avoided mentioning Pakistan by name.

Mallikarjun Kharge, President of the Indian National Congress, said that terrorism has no place in a civilised society.

=== Separatists reaction ===
On 3 January 2023, the Hurriyat Conference, led by Mirwaiz Umar Farooq, denounced killings of civilians in Rajouri. The Hurriyat said that decisions and acts taken on an individual basis "cannot undo the conflict or stop it."

== Government response ==
Manoj Sinha announced Rs 10 lakh (₹1,000,000) ex-gratia and a government job to the next of kin of the civilians killed in the incident. He later met with the families of those killed in the attacks on Monday and offered his condolences. He told the family that both the government and the entire country would be behind them.

In response to attacks in the Rajouri, the Central Reserve Police Force (CRPF) would send an additional 18 companies to Jammu and Kashmir. The additional 1,800 troops would primarily be stationed in the Rajouri and Poonch districts to bolster anti-militancy operations there. As of 4 January 2023, nine companies have already arrived in Rajouri and the remaining forces will reach in the night.

On 21 January 2023, job appointment letters were distributed by authorities to the next of kin of seven individuals who were killed.

== Aftermath ==
In Rajouri, the attack sparked protests and strikes as residents hold the local administration accountable for the security lapse.

On the evening of 2 January 2023, Manoj Sinha ordered an in-depth investigation into "security lapses" in the wake of twin terror attacks.

Although the improvised explosive device explosion and firing suggest a professional hand according to intelligence sources, The Resistance Front (TRF) denied that it was a terror strike.

On 6 January 2023, roughly a dozen people were taken into custody reportedly for helping militants in terror attack.

On 7 January 2023, Vikas Kundal, the deputy commissioner of Rajouri, visited the Baljaralan area to check on the distribution of guns and ammunition to the village defence guards (VDGs), which will increase security in the region. The VDGs are obtaining the weapons and ammunition from the police. A camp was set up for the purpose.

=== Protests and shutdown over the incident ===
On 2 January 2023, several social, political, and student organisations denounced the killing of people in the Dangri terror incident in Rajouri on Monday. Jammu University students held a candlelight march on campus to voice their outrage over the killings. Meanwhile, the J&K Shiv Sena / Dogra Front condemned the targeted killing of minority communities based on their identity cards. Activists from IkkJutt Jammu, led by chairman Ankur Sharma, staged a protest demonstration outside Jammu's Press Club to condemn the government' failure to prevent the terror attack. The Vishva Hindu Parishad and the Bajrang Dal staged a similar rally in Udhampur in response to the killings of innocent people in Rajouri. To express their distress at the killings, they set fire to a Pakistani effigy.

While this was going on, numerous Muslim organizations including the Seerat Committee Doda and Majlis-e-Shaura Committee Kishtwar in Chenab Valley denounced the killings and referred to the Rajouri terror incident as an "act of cowardice." On 3 January, a complete bandh (strike) was called in the districts of Doda and Kishtwar in protest against the killings of Rajouri's civilians. In Thathri, President Beopar Mandal (Market Association) Parvez Kichloo called for a complete strike on 3 January.

On 3 January 2023, Poonch district was completely shut down in protest of the terror attacks in Rajouri. The Vishva Hindu Parishad (VHP) and Bajrang Dal supported the Sanatan Dharam Sabha's call for a shutdown. The shutdown and protest held against terrorism and UT government led by LG Administration.

Shutdowns and protests were observed across Chenab Valley. Shops and businesses were closed on 3 January in protest against Rajouri attack on civilians. Protesters raised slogans against Pakistan and the LG administration led by Manoj Sinha. On 4 January 2023, the shutdown in Poonch reached its second day. Protests were held in Kathua and Jammu.

== See also ==
- 2025 Pahalgam attack
- 2019 Pulwama attack
