= Thermal Power Plant Kalakote =

Coal-fired power station in Kalakote, India

- Country: India
- Location: Kalakote, Jammu and Kashmir
- Coordinates: 33°13′3.36″N 74°25′15.96″E
- Status: Closed
- Construction began: 1963
- Commission date: 1968
- Decommission date: 1987
- Owners: Power Development Department Jammu and Kashmir

Thermal power station
- Primary fuel: Coal

Power generation
- Units operational: 2 × 350 KW
- Nameplate capacity: 22.5 MW

Thermal Power Plant Kalakote was the first coal-fired power station of North India. It is located in the Kalakote town of Rajouri district in the Indian union territory of Jammu and Kashmir.

== History ==
Kalakote was a coal rich tehsil with coals mines in different regions of tehsil including Moghla, Metka and Chokkar. To utilize the coal resources, Power Development Department of government of union territory (state then) of Jammu and Kashmir in collaboration with Energoinvest decided to open a power plant in Sair (now Kalakote town) area of Kalakote tehsil. On May 23, 1963, Bakshi Ghulam Mohammad laid the first stone of power plant. With the starting of power plant in 1964, to handle the influx, many shops, hotels, theatres and colonies were settled up.

== Commissioning ==
The commissioning of the project was started on trial basis from November 1, 1968. After 3rd commissioning in 1987, the plant held ceased to function. The thickness of the coal of Kalakote coal mines range from 0.15 meters to 0.75 meters in upper coal and between 0.50 meter to 1.5 meter in lower coal with fifty percent ash content, the deposits are neither uniform nor of the required quality in terms of ash content and seam thickness and because of these reasons plant was decided to close on 1989.

== After closure ==
The development done due to plant played an important role in the development of Kalakote town. Even after being decommissioned, the government is still spending 1.1 million rupees every year for salaries of around 250 workers of plant. After the closure, there have been reports of theft of iron and machinery parts from plant several times.

== See also ==
- Kalakote
- Kalakote Assembly constituency
- Government Degree College, Kalakote
