= Sialsui =

- Village
- Location in Jammu and Kashmir, India Sialsui (India)
- Coordinates: 33.21°N 74.40°E
- Country: India
- Union Territory: Jammu and Kashmir
- District: Rajouri

Population (2011)
  - Total: 2,950

Languages
  - Official: Dogri, Hindi, Kashmiri, Urdu, English
  - Spoken: Pahari, Gujari
- Time zone: UTC+5:30 (IST)
- PIN: 185202

Sialsui is a village in Rajouri district of the Indian union territory of Jammu and Kashmir in India. As per Census 2011 report, the location code or village code of Sialsui village is 001507. It is located 20 km towards the South from Rajouri, which is the district and 15 km away from the sub-district headquarter Kalakote of Sialsui village.

The total geographical area in which this village is expanded is 2463.3 hectares. Sialsui has a total population of 2950 people. There are about 670 families residing in Sialsui village. Rajouri is the nearest town to Sialsui which is nearly 20 km away.
