= Dangri, Jammu and Kashmir =

Dangri
- village
- Location in Jammu & Kashmir, India Dangri (India)
- Coordinates: 33.34805°N 74.4066°E
- Country: India
- Union Territory: Jammu & Kashmir
- District: Rajouri

Languages
  - Official: Urdu
  - Spoken: Urdu, Hindi, Dogri, Gujari, Pahari & English

Demographics
- Time zone: UTC+5:30 (IST)
- Vehicle registration: JK11
- Website: https://rajouri.nic.in/

Dangri is a village located in Rajouri district of Jammu region in the Indian union territory of Jammu and Kashmir.

The village is the site of the 2023 Rajouri attacks.
