= Tatta Pani, Kalakote =

Tatta Pani
- Village
- Location in Jammu and Kashmir, India Tatta Pani (India)
- Coordinates: 33°14′34.01″N 74°24′54.68″E
- Country: India
- Union Territory: Jammu and Kashmir
- Tehsil: Kalakote

Government
  - Body: Panchayat Raj

Languages
  - Official: Urdu
  - Spoken: Urdu, Hindi, Dogri, Gujari, Pahari & English
- Time zone: UTC+5:30 (IST)
- PIN: 185202

Tatta Pani is a village with a natural hot water sulfur spring located in the Kalakote tehsil of Rajouri district in the Indian union territory of Jammu and Kashmir. The hot spring is situated near the Pir Panjal Range and is approximately 14 km (8.7 mi) away from Kalakote town.

== Etymology ==
The word Tatta Pani itself means hot water in the Pahari language, where 'Tatta' stands for hot and 'Pani' stands for water. So, because of the hot water spring, the village is named Tatta Pani.

== Geography ==
Tata Pani is located at 33°14′34.01″N 74°24′54.68″E. The village is located at an altitude of approximately 1,500 meters above sea level and is surrounded by lush green forests. It has an average elevation of 700 m (2,300 ft). Tatta Pani has a humid subtropical, dry climate. Its yearly temperature is 28.16 °C (82.69 °F), which is 2.19% higher than India’s averages. It typically receives about 22.15 millimeters (0.87 inches) of precipitation and experiences 28.48 rainy days annually (7.8% of the time). The Pincode of Tatta Pani is 185202.

== Medical importance ==
The water is said to have medicinal properties, and the spring has medicinal properties to cure bone, joint, and skin ailments. Many tourists visit Tata Pani to take a dip in the hot water and enjoy its therapeutic benefits. The hot spring is also a popular picnic spot and attracts a large number of visitors during the summer months. There are several small shops and eateries located near Tata Pani where visitors can buy refreshments and souvenirs.

== See also ==
- Rajouri
- Kalakote
- Tourism in Jammu and Kashmir
