= Aarti Tikoo Singh =

Indian journalist

- Born: Anantnag, Jammu & Kashmir, India
- Education: MA Political Science; MA English; MA International Affairs; University of Jammu; Columbia University
- Occupation: Journalist
- Employer: The New Indian

Aarti Tikoo Singh is an Indian journalist who is known for being vocal on the Kashmir conflict and strongly considers herself secular. She is an alumnus of University of Jammu and did master's in international affairs from Columbia University in New York City.

== Early life and education ==
Singh was born in the Anantnag district of Jammu and Kashmir, India, into a Kashmiri Pandit family. After the exodus of Kashmiri Hindus from the Kashmir Valley in the early 1990s, she had to move to Jammu with her family. She has stated that she lived in an IDP camp for over a decade. She studied in University of Jammu and also did master's in international affairs from New York's Columbia University and starting her career she went to New Delhi and is currently residing there.

Aarti Tikoo is married to Harbir Singh, a former politician with Aam Aadmi Party.

== Career ==
As a reporter, she has worked in conflict zones across India such as Chhattisgarh, Jharkhand and Assam.

After working with dailies in India such as Hindustan Times and as senior assistant editor with The Times of India, she worked as a foreign and security affairs editor at the Indo-Asian News Service (IANS) agency. In August 2021, she founded The New Indian. Singh has over 20 years of experience in journalism, focusing on international relations and conflicts. She reported from the state of Jammu and Kashmir, a conflict-ridden state for almost seven years, covering politics, violence, governance and human stories. Singh represented in a United States Congressional hearing on Kashmir, where she had a face-off with Congresswoman Ilhan Omar, who alleged that she was making "incredible dubious" claims that Indian government's crackdown in Kashmir was good for human rights. Singh responded that she was always critical of Indian government's human rights violations in Kashmir, but she was also criticising the western media which often present the story without its context.

== Awards ==
Singh is a Times Aspire award winner and a WISCOMP (Women in Security, Conflict Management Peace) fellowship awardee.
