= Shakeel Ahmed (scientist) =

Assistant professor of chemistry (born 1989)

Shakeel Ahmed (also known as Shakeel Chaudhary; born 1989) is an assistant professor of chemistry in the Department of Higher Education, Government of Jammu and Kashmir.

== Biography ==
Shakeel Ahmed was born and raised in the small village Nonial of Nowshera, Jammu and Kashmir. He obtained his bachelor's degree from Government Post Graduate College Rajouri. He obtained a master's and Ph.D. degree in chemistry from Jamia Millia Islamia, New Delhi. Ahmed is the elected fellow of the International Society for Development and Sustainability.

== Academic research ==
Ahmed's areas of interest include green materials and bionanocomposites. He has published several research articles and books in the area of polymer nanocomposites, biopolymer and green nanomaterials.

=== Books ===
- Ahmed, Shakeel, ed. (2021). Advanced Green Materials. doi:10.1016/C2019-0-01194-6. ISBN 978-0-12-819988-6.
- Ahmed, Shakeel, ed. (2021). Applications of Advanced Green Materials. doi:10.1016/C2019-0-02501-0. ISBN 978-0-12-820484-9.
- Ahmed, Shakeel; Annu, eds. (2021). Bionanocomposites in Tissue Engineering and Regenerative Medicine. doi:10.1016/C2019-0-03520-0. ISBN 978-0-12-821280-6.
- Ahmed, Shakeel; Ikram, Saiqa, eds. (2017). Chitosan. doi:10.1002/9781119364849. ISBN 978-1-119-36350-7.
- Ahmed, Shakeel (2018). Biocomposites. doi:10.1201/9781315110806. ISBN 978-1-315-11080-6.
- Ahmed, Shakeel, ed. (2018). Bio-based Materials for Food Packaging. doi:10.1007/978-981-13-1909-9. ISBN 978-981-13-1908-2.
- Ahmed, Shakeel; Kanchi, Suvardhan, eds. (2018). Handbook of Bionanocomposites. doi:10.1201/9781351170680. ISBN 978-1-351-17067-3.
- Ahmed, Shakeel, ed. (2022). Bionanocomposites for Food Packaging Applications. doi:10.1016/C2020-0-03286-X. ISBN 978-0-323-88528-7.
- Ahmed, Shakeel, ed. (2019). Alginates. doi:10.1002/9781119487999. ISBN 978-1-119-48799-9.
- Pandit, Pintu; Ahmed, Shakeel; Singha, Kunal; Shrivastava, Sanjay, eds. (2020). Recycling from Waste in Fashion and Textiles. doi:10.1002/9781119620532. ISBN 978-1-119-62049-5.
- Kanchi, Suvardhan; Ahmed, Shakeel, eds. (2018). Green Metal Nanoparticles. doi:10.1002/9781119418900. ISBN 978-1-119-41823-8.
- Ahmed, Shakeel; Chaudhry, Saif Ali, eds. (2019). Composites for Environmental Engineering. doi:10.1002/9781119555346. ISBN 978-1-119-55529-2.
- Ahmed, Shakeel; Hussain, Chaudhery Mustansar, eds. (2018). Green and Sustainable Advanced Materials. doi:10.1002/9781119407089. ISBN 978-1-119-40708-9.
- Ahmed, Shakeel; Hussain, Chaudhery Mustansar, eds. (2018). Green and Sustainable Advanced Materials. doi:10.1002/9781119528463. ISBN 978-1-119-52836-4.
