= Azmatabad, Jammu and Kashmir =

Azmatabad
- Village
- Location in Jammu and Kashmir, India Azmatabad (India)
- Coordinates: 33.56°N 74.37°E
- Country: India
- Union Territory: Jammu and Kashmir
- District: Rajouri
- Tehsil: Thanamandi

Population (2011)
  - Total: 1,554

Languages
  - Official: Dogri, Hindi, Urdu, Kashmiri, English
  - Spoken: Pahari
- Time zone: UTC+5:30 (IST)
- PIN: 185212

Azmatabad is a village, near Rajouri City in Thanamandi tehsil in Rajouri district of the Indian union territory of Jammu and Kashmir.

== Demographics ==
According to the 2011 census of India, Azmatabad has 298 households. The literacy rate of Azmatabad village was 64.31% compared to 67.16% of Jammu and Kashmir. In Azmatabad, Male literacy stands at 78.98% while the female literacy rate was 49.45%.

Demographics (2011 Census)
	Total	Male	Female
Population	1554	779	775
Children aged below 6 years	268	132	136
Scheduled caste	0	0	0
Scheduled tribe	0	0	0
Literacy	64.31%	78.98%	49.45%
Workers (all)	695	370	325
Main workers (total)	158	–	–
Marginal workers (total)	537	240	297

== Transport ==
=== Road ===
Azmatabad is connected by road with other places in Jammu and Kashmir and India by the Mughal Road and NH 144A.

=== Rail ===
The nearest railway stations to Azmatabad are Anantnag railway station and Jammu Tawi railway station located at a distance of 140 and 177 kilometres respectively.

=== Air ===
The nearest airport is Srinagar International Airport located at a distance of 165 kilometres and is a 5-hour drive.

== See also ==
- Jammu and Kashmir
- Rajouri
- Rajouri district
