= Shahnawaz Choudhary =

State General Secretary of the Jammu & Kashmir Pradesh Congress Committee
- Incumbent
- Assumed office May 2015

State President (J&K) of the Indian Youth Congress
- In office May 2012 – May 2015

National Secretary of the Indian Youth Congress
- In office 2010–2012

General Secretary of the National Students Union of India
- In office 2009–2010

State Vice President (J&K) of the National Students Union of India
- In office 2008–2009

State General Secretary (J&K) of the National Students Union of India
- In office 2007–2008

State Secretary (J&K) of the National Students Union of India
- In office 2006–2007

Personal details
- Born: 3 March 1984 (age 42) Vill. Hari, Teh. Surankote, Jammu & Kashmir, India
- Party: Indian National Congress
- Parent(s): Haq Nawaz (Retd. SP, J&K Police)
- Education: University of Jammu; JNV Surankote
- Profession: Politician

Mohammad Shahnawaz Choudhary is an Indian political activist. Until 2014 he was the President of the J&K Pradesh Youth Congress, and he was later the General Secretary of the Jammu & Kashmir Pradesh Congress Committee. He is currently a DDC member of Surankote A constituency. He defeated Choudhary Mohd Akram (ex MLA Surankote) by 2675 votes. He raised his voice at different platforms for the welfare of Poonch district people. He was the first elected President of the J&K Pradesh Youth Congress. He joined course B.A L.L.B at The Law School, University of Jammu.

== Political activity ==
In 2009, Choudhary was appointed All India General Secretary of the National Students Union of India and oversaw its activities in Delhi and the North Eastern States. He was selected for this position through a national talent hunt in which the best leaders amongst the students of India were selected. He also led the protest against the attacks on Indian students in Australia and gheraoed the Embassy of Australia in New Delhi. In August, 2010, he was appointed as National Secretary All India Youth Congress. He remained in charge of various states in India as the National Secretary of Youth Congress.

Choudhary led a Statewide protest against the Jammu & Kashmir National Conference led State Government for non-implementation of the 73rd and 74th Amendments to the Constitution of India for the empowerment of Pachayats in J&K. During his tenure as National General Secretary NSUI, he led a mass rally in Delhi University against Ragging. He also started a helpline for the students who are victims of ragging, "Our helpline will provide moral support to the victims of ragging. And their complaints will be tackled with utmost immediacy, since as of now, it takes time," said Mohd Shahnawaz, NSUI's National General Secretary while leading the campaign. Choudhary also started his rural connect campaign "Jan Chetna Yatra", soon after taking charge as the first elected state president of youth congress, and visited almost every village in the state of J&K. During his campaign he made the farmers and other stake holders aware about the policies and programs of the government and also criticised the anti-people acts of the state government.

During his presidency, he established public durbars and open forums to connect the government with its citizens. He positioned himself as a conduit through which people could both take advantage of government programs and voice criticism of any wrongdoing.

In 2014, he visited flood-damaged areas in Surankote and distributed relief supplies. He was later appointed as the Convener of the campaign committee of Indian National Congress for the Jammu & Kashmir Pradesh Assembly elections that year.

In March 2015, he led a protest against the release from prison of separatist leader Masarat Alam. Later that year, in Srinagar, representing the Congress, he addressed a crowd at a protest against evacuations of forest residents in the area.

In the recent Bihar state assembly elections, he was appointed as the coordinator for AICC (All India Congress Committee) and worth to mention that INC secured the best results in the elections. He was appointed as Coordinator for Demonetization campaign in Chhattisgarh. He also worked as Incharge secretary, IYC in Uttar Pradesh and Odisha.

He is also the Founder President of Society For Justice, Awareness and Deliverance (NGO), State President of All J&K Gujjar & Bakerwal students, Co-ordinator of YAKJAH (J&K), and General Secretary of National Progressive Youth Organization (NGO). He was Elected General Secretary of Students Advocates Council of The Law School, JU and Elected Cultural Secretary of Jammu University.
