= Kotranka =

- Sub-district
- Location in Jammu and Kashmir, India Kotranka (India)
- Coordinates: 33.35°N 74.51°E
- Country: India
- Union Territory: Jammu and Kashmir
- District: Rajouri
- Tehsil: Kotranka
- Elevation: 915 m (3,002 ft)

Population (2011)
  - Total: 1,434

Languages
  - Official: Gojri, Kashmiri, Urdu, Hindi, Dogri, English
  - Spoken: Gujari, Pahari
- Time zone: UTC+5:30 (IST)
- PIN Code: 185233
- Sex ratio: 668 ♀/ 766 ♂
- Literacy: 66.61%
- Distance from Rajouri: 39 kilometres (24 mi)
- Distance from Budal: 20 kilometres (12 mi)

Kotranka or Kot Ranka is a Sub division of Rajouri district in the union territory of Jammu and Kashmir, India.

It is situated on the banks of Ans River (a tributary of the Chenab River), which falls under the Southern range of Peer Panchal.

The distance between Rajouri and Kotranka is 39 km. Kotranka is 20 km from Budhal.
