= Ravinder Sharma =

Indian craftsman and educator

Guruji Ravinder Sharma
- Born: 5 September 1952; Adilabad, Telangana, India
- Died: 29 April 2018 (aged 65); Adilabad, Telangana, India
- Organization: Kala Ashram
- Honors: Kala Ratna Award

Ravinder Sharma (5 September 1952 - 29 April 2018), known publicly as Guruji, was an Indian artist, craftsman, storyteller, historian, educationist, sociologist, economist in the native Indian context. He was the founder of Adilabad's Kala Ashram and has been awarded with Kala Ratna Award by the Government of Andhra Pradesh in 2014. Guruji is credited with playing a crucial role for almost four decades in the preservation of the India's ancient rural and tribal art forms.

== Early life ==
Guruji was born in a migrant Punjabi family. His early education was in a local school in Adilabad. Since his childhood, Guruji was inclined towards understanding art and the life of the artisan communities. He extensively explored villages and localities in a radius of 20 kilometers. In the 20 year long journeys, Guruji explored and studied the intricacies of rural life and local technologies. After schooling in Adilabad, Guruji pursued sculpture at the Jawaharlal Nehru Architecture and Fine Arts University of Hyderabad. He obtained his post-graduation diploma from the University of Baroda Faculty of Fine Arts in Gujarat.

== Works ==
In his 20 years journey, Guruji collected artifacts and other material from rural areas. Guruji's collection includes a lot of material used by tribal people as part of their culture. His exposure and interactions with the tribal and rural communities built his knowledge about rural economy and technologies, local practices and folk arts.

In 1979, Guruji established Kala Ashram, which has been involved in various activities to bridge the gap between traditional cultural experience and the requirements of modernity with specific reference to traditional, rural artisan and artist communities. The Kala Ashram was actually established to serve as an asylum for destitute and ignored artisans but evolved in a knowledge centre in due course. It hosted some very important events connected with artisans like the Karigar Panchayat in 2008. Guruji shared his knowledge along with insights and anecdotes with people visiting the Kala Ashram and different forums across the country.

Guruji promoted traditional eco-friendly practices, such as production of clay Ganesha idols and bamboo art. These initiatives involved collaboration with local indigenous groups, including Kolam of Adilabad district.

== Awards and recognitions ==
Guruji had been awarded with Kala Ratna by the Government of Andhra Pradesh in 2014. After the bifurcation of the State, the Telangana government awarded him the Ugadi Puraskaram in 2015. For his work on rural science and technology, Guruji was also conferred the D.Litt. (Honoris Causa) by the Shree Guru Gobind Singh Tricentenary University, Gurugram, Haryana the same year. He had won many other minor awards during his lifetime.

== Death and legacy ==
Guruji was suffering from cancer in later part of his life. He died at home, in his sleep, at the age of 65. The death was condoled by Forest Minister Jogu Ramanna, Boath MLA Rathod Bapu Rao and others from Adilabad. Guruji was considered to be an expert in 'Indian way of life' and many people from across India gathered to pay him last tributes in the ashram.

The collected articles on Ravinder Sharma have been put in a book titled Smiriti Jagran Ke Harkare. The Kala Ashram setup by Guruji, now serves as a hub of rural knowledge and people from different parts of India visit to learn about the rural technologies.
