= Sunderbani =

Sunderbani Green Valley
- Town
- Nickname: Sandar bani
- Location in Jammu and Kashmir, India Sunderbani (India)
- Coordinates: 33.04°N 74.49°E
- Country: India
- Union Territory: Jammu and Kashmir
- District: Rajouri
- Named for: Sundra

Government
  - Type: Democratic
  - Body: M.C. Sunderbani
- Elevation: 633 m (2,077 ft)

Population (2011)
  - Total: 7,200

Languages
  - Official: Dogri, Pahari, Gojri
- Time zone: UTC+5:30 (IST)
- PIN: 185153

Sunderbani is a town and a notified area committee, about 70 km from Rajouri Town in Rajouri district in Jammu and Kashmir.

== Geography ==
Sunderbani is located at 33.04°N 74.49°E. It has an average elevation of 633 metres (2,077 feet).

== Demographics ==
As of 2011 India census, Sunderbani had a population of 10,531. Sunderbani comprises many villages like

Bhajwal	Rawarian talla	Bakhar	Balchaman	Bamlia		
Bandrahi	Barnara	Basant Pur				
Chak Nawabad	Chak Tawela					
Changi Kangrial	Chehni	Deoli				
Devak	Dhar	Dhok Bainar	Dhrooth	Gandeh	Ghantha	Goraha Charala
Hathal	Kaldubi	Kangri				
Lamman	Langar	Lohara Kot	Makol			
Manikah	Marchola	Mawa				
Nah	Nala	Nauti				
Owna	Patni	Patrara				
Prat	Peli	Phal				
Sehia	Siot	Sunderbani				
Thanda Pani	Thangrot	Thichka				
Tala Tanda

=== Religion ===
Hinduism is the largest religion in Sunderbani, followed by over 90% of the people. Among the Hindus there is a significant population of Brahmins of which most of them had roots in Pakistan Occupied Jammu and Kashmir (PoJK) areas like Poonch Jagir and Mirpur. In sunderbani after Hinduism, Sikhism is the second-largest religion with 5.4% adherents. Christianity and Islam form 0.56% and 3.59% of the population, respectively. As per the 2011 census of India, the population of Scheduled Castes (SC) constitutes 8.9%, while Scheduled Tribes (ST) were 7.6% of total population in the Sunderbani Tehsil.

Religion in Sunderbani Town (2011)
1. Hinduism (90.4%)
2. Sikhism (5.40%)
3. Islam (3.59%)
4. Christianity (0.56%)
5. Buddhism (0.06%)
6. Not Stated (0.01%)

== Transport ==
=== Air ===
The nearest airport to Sunderbani is Rajouri Airport, located at a distance of 70 kilometers.

=== Rail ===
There is no rail connectivity to Sunderbani. The nearest railway station is Jammu Tawi railway station, located at a distance of 80 kilometers.

=== Road ===
The National Highway 144A goes through Sunderbani town.

== Education ==
=== Colleges ===
There is a private educational complex consisting of colleges like Swami Vishwatmanand Saraswati Degree College, SVS Paramedical College, SVS BEd College, and Guru Gangdev Ji Sanskrit College. Also, the Government established GDC Sunderbani in the year 2012. The new campus of GDC has been established at Thanda Pani, with improved and better infrastructure. In January 2023, the college was shifted to its own building at Tandapani on the Rajouri-Poonch highway. The new college building was inaugurated by Hon'ble Prime Minister Sh. Narinder Modi on the 20th of February 2024 through virtual mode.]

=== Schools ===
There are a number of schools in Sunderbani like: 1.Harsh Niketan Higher secondary school Sunderbani, 2.New public school Sunderbani, 3.Bharat Public school Sunderbani Near Zonal Education Office Sunderbani),

4.Kendriya Vidyalaya B.S.F campus sunderbani, 

5.Govt.Boys Higher Secondary School Sunderbani, 6.Girls Higher Secondary School Sunderbani, 7. Kalidhar Memorial Army School Sunderbani (HQ 28 Inf bde Sunderbani), 8. SGGD Model Higher Secondary School Sunderbani (Shiv Kashi Ashram), 9. Raja New light Academy Sunderbani, and 10. International Public Higher Secondary School Bajabain.

== Nearby places of attraction ==
=== Eagle Point, Sunderbani. ===
Eagle Point is Around 5–6 km away from sunderbani town towards the Bindi village road and all the way to Larya village.

=== Shri Mata vaishno devi, katra ===
Shri mata Vaishno devi temple is around 74 km from Sunderbani

=== Shivkhori Temple ===
Shiv Khori cave is around 45 km away from Sunderbani

=== Charnot Temple ===
Charnot Temple is around 8 km away from Sunderbani

=== Mangla Mata Temple ===
This temple is around 41 km away from Sunderbani to Jhangar via Nowshera town.

=== Shree Raghunath Temple Prat ===
This temple is around 08 km away from Sunderbani.

=== Baba Bhairav Nath Temple Prat ===
This temple is around 08 km away from Sunderbani.

=== Durga Mata Mandir, Lamman ===
This mandir is around 2.5 km away from Sunderbani.

=== Shahdara Sharief, Temple ===
Shahdara Sharief is around 97 km away from Sunderbani.

=== Thakur Dwara Temple Nowshera ===
This temple is 31 kilometers from Sunderbani and is situated at Nowshera town. It is the biggest temple in the Rajouri district and is one of the biggest temple in Jammu and Kashmir.

== Politics ==
- Sh. Radhey Sham Sharma is an ex MLA.
- Sh. Ravinder Sharma is an ex MLC in the Indian National Congress.
- Sh. Randhir Singh is the incumbent MLA from the Bharatiya Janata Party.
