= University of Jammu =

State University in Jammu, India

Coordinates: 32.7186°N 74.8692°E

- Type: Public
- Established: 1969; 57 years ago
- Affiliations: UGC
- Chancellor: Lieutenant Governor of Jammu and Kashmir
- Vice-Chancellor: Umesh Rai
- Location: Jammu, Jammu and Kashmir, India
- Campus: Urban; 118.78 acres (0.4807 km^{2})
- Language: Hindi, English, Dogri
- Website: jammuuniversity.ac.in

The University of Jammu informally known as Jammu University (JU), accredited as A++ grade by National Assessment and Accreditation Council (NAAC), was established in 1969 by an act of the state legislature which effectively split the Jammu and Kashmir University into the separate University of Jammu and University of Kashmir.

The university is currently located at the foothills of Trikuta on the banks of the Tawi River. The university has set up seven off-site campuses at Bhaderwah, Kishtwar, Poonch, Reasi, Ramnagar, Kathua and Udhampur. The university is the first university in India to receive the ISO-9001 certification. The university offers undergraduate, postgraduate and doctoral programs. It also affiliates and recognizes colleges.

== Campus ==
The main campus of Jammu University is situated at Baba Saheb Ambedkar Road in Jammu at an altitude of 1030 ft above sea level. The main campus of the university houses the teaching departments, health centre, guest house, post office, Jammu & Kashmir Bank, bookshop, hostels, cafeteria and canteens and many other facilities. The second campus of the university (the old campus) is spread over 10.5 acres which are located at a distance of 4 km from the main campus and currently has residential quarters for teaching and non-teaching employees and three hostels for boys.

== Organisation and administration ==
The lieutenant governor of the J&K UT is the chancellor. The university has 36 departments and 157 affiliated colleges, awarding degrees in more than 50 programmes at the postgraduate and undergraduate levels.

=== Faculties and departments ===
The University of Jammu has 11 faculties and 36 academic departments which offer courses in a wide variety of subjects and concentrations.

Faculty	Departments
Faculty of Life Sciences	School of Biotechnology; Institute of Human Genetics; Department of Botany; Department of Environmental Science; Department of Zoology; Department of Biochemistry; Department of Microbiology
Faculty of Arts and Oriental Languages	Department of Buddhist Studies; Department of Dogri; Department of English; Department of Hindi; Department of Punjabi; Department of Sanskrit; Department of Urdu; Department of Journalism and Media Studies
Faculty of Sciences	Department of Chemistry; Department of Geology; Department of Geography; Department of Home Science; Department of Physics and Electronics; Department of Remote Sensing and GIS
Faculty of Education	Department of Education; Department of Physical Education
Faculty of Business Studies	The Business School; School of Hospitality and Tourism Management; International Centre for Cross-Cultural Research and Human Resource Management; Department of Commerce
Faculty of Mathematical Sciences	Department of Mathematics; Department of Statistics; Department of Computer Science and IT
Faculty of Architecture	—
Faculty of Law	Department of Law; The Law School
Faculty of Social Sciences	Department of Economics; Department of History; Department of Political Science; Department of Library and Information Science; Department of Psychology; Department for Strategic and Regional Studies; Department of Sociology; Department of Life Long Learning
Faculty of Medicine	—
Faculty of Engineering	—
Faculty of Music and Fine Arts	—

== Academics ==
=== Ranking ===
University and College rankings

General – India
- NIRF (Overall) (2024): 87
- NIRF (Universities) (2024): 50

The university was ranked 50th among Indian universities by the NIRF (National Institutional Ranking Framework) in 2024 and 87th overall.

=== Library ===
==== Dhanvantri Library ====
The Dhanvantri Library, the central library of the university, is a 4-storied building having an area of 60,000 square feet. It offers about 5 lakh books, journals, and 276 current periodicals, etc. on a variety of subjects that caters to the needs of the students, teachers, and researchers. The library has large reading halls which can easily accommodate about 500 users. Most of the library has been computerized. A special technology, RIFD technology, is used for security purposes in the library.

==== Departmental libraries ====
Almost all departments run their own departmental libraries. These libraries provide a wide spectrum of Journals in addition to books to the students. The collections present in departmental libraries are catalogued and accessioned by the Dhanvantri Library.

=== Health centre ===
A first-aid centre was initially established in the premises of the boys' hostels of the university managed by a part-time medical assistant. Later, the first aid centre was upgraded to a full-fledged health centre in the early 170s to provide medical aid benefits to the university community and the dependents of the university employees.

=== Auditorium ===
The Dogri Sanstha and KVM TRUST are getting a huge auditorium built at Dogri Bhawan, Karan Nagar, Jammu. The Kunwar Viyogi Auditorium will be a hub of art and culture, a centre for the confluence of poets, artists, writers, art connoisseurs, patrons and for youth. Dogri Sanstha in collaboration with The Dogri Department is working to preserve and promote the language and culture of Duggars. The Auditorium was being inaugurated by Dr Jitendra Singh Hon’ble Union Minister Of State on 15 September 2019.

== Notable alumni and facilities ==
=== Notable alumni ===
- Ghulam Nabi Azad is an Indian politician of the Indian National Congress, 7th Chief Minister of Jammu and Kashmir and was the Minister of Health and Family Welfare. Presently, he serves as the Leader of opposition in Rajya Sabha.
- Dr Nirmal Singh is an Indian politician of Bharatiya Janata Party. He was the Deputy Chief Minister of erstwhile State of Jammu and Kashmir and Speaker of Jammu and Kashmir Legislative Assembly. Singh did his PhD from the university in 1988 and joined as the lecturer of Modern History, Department of History in 1989. He retired as a professor in 2017.
- Justice T. S. Thakur, 43rd Chief Justice of India.
- Javaid Rahi is a prominent Tribal Researcher of India. During last two decades, he has authored around 25 books and edited well over 300 publications /books—covering tribal history, folklore, language, and culture.
- Jamyang Tsering Namgyal, former Member of Parliament, Lok Sabha from Ladakh
- Chowdhary Zulfkar Ali is an Indian Politician and was Minister for Education in the State. Presently, he is a senior leader of Jammu and Kashmir Apni Party.

Rehan Katrawale

Abhishek Singh Rajput, better known as Rehan Katrawale (born 19 January 2001) is an Indian Actor, Writer and Poet from Katra, Jammu and Kashmir. Known for his contribution in the world of cinema, Rehan also holds an Honours Degree in Psychology from University of Jammu. Rehan Katrawale worked in a number of films and short films like Death Slayer 2, Paradox, Godfather, SpyUniverse and many more.

- Shahnawaz Choudhary
- Aarti Tikoo Singh, a journalist in The Times of India, conflict and international affairs writer and former reporter
- Permod Kohli, Chief Justice of Sikkim High Court

Mohit Raina

Mohit Raina is an Indian Actor known for portraying the role of Mahadev in Devo ke Dev Mahadev. In addition to this he had worked in a number or bollywood films. He was born in Jammu and Kashmir and studied under University of Jammu.
