= Kalakote =

- town
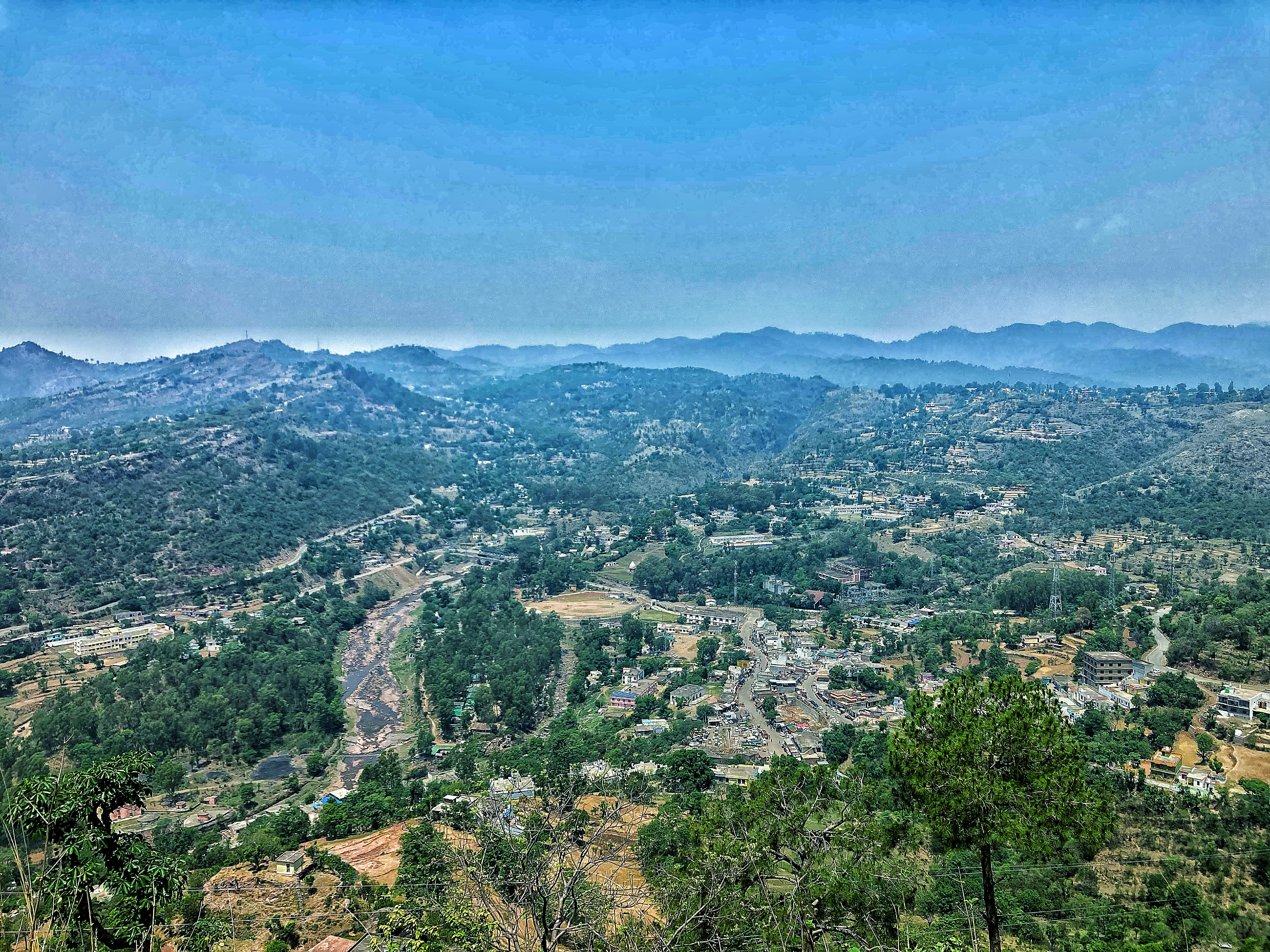
- View of Kalakote
- Interactive map of Kalakote
- Location in Jammu and Kashmir, India Kalakote (India)
- Coordinates: 33°12′50″N 74°25′22″E
- Country: India
- Union Territory: Jammu and Kashmir
- District: Rajouri

Government
  - Type: Democratic
  - Body: MC Kalakote
  - Vidhan Sabha Seats: 1 Seat

Area
  - Total: 1.27 km^{2} (0.49 sq mi)

Population (2011)
  - Total: 558
  - Density: 439/km^{2} (1,140/sq mi)

Languages
  - Official: Urdu
  - Spoken: Urdu, Hindi, Dogri, Gujari, Pahari & English

Demographics
  - Literacy: 77.95%
  - Sex ratio: 680
- Time zone: UTC+5:30 (IST)
- PIN: 185202
- Vehicle registration: JK11
- Website: https://rajouri.nic.in/

Kalakote is a town located in Rajouri district of Jammu region in the Indian union territory of Jammu and Kashmir. Kalakote is noted for its coal mines and is home to the first Thermal Power Plant inNorth India. Additionally, the town serves as the headquarters for various administrative entities, including a tehsil, sub-division, block, municipal committee, and constituency, all bearing the name Kalakote.

== Administration ==
=== Tehsil ===
Kalakote tehsil is one of the thirteen administrative subdivisions of the Rajouri district. Its administrative headquarters are based in the town of Kalakote. The tehsil is led by the Tehsildar, currently Manik Singh Rathore, who oversees the revenue department and administrative affairs in all the towns and villages under the jurisdiction of Kalakote tehsil.

=== Sub division ===
Kalakote division constitutes one of the five administrative divisions of Rajouri district in India, with its headquarters located in the town of Kalakote. The division is overseen by the ADC (Additional Deputy Commissioner), currently held by Mohammad Tanwir. Its primary objective is to administer and govern all the towns and villages falling under the Kalakote tehsil, striving to ensure effective and efficient governance across the region.

=== Block ===
Kalakote block is one of the nineteen administrative blocks in Rajouri district, with its headquarters located in Kalakote. The administrative head of this block is commonly referred to as the Block Development Officer (BDO), and currently, Raj Singh holds the position of BDO for Kalakote. The primary objective of this block is to oversee rural development and infrastructure across all villages falling under the Kalakote tehsil.

=== Municipal Committee ===
Kalakote municipality is one of the five administrative divisions in the Rajouri district, with its headquarters located in Kalakote. The head of the municipality holds the title of chairman, and currently, the position is held by Vijay Suri. The chairman and members of the municipality are elected every five years through a process overseen by the district administration of Rajouri. The primary objective of the municipality is to oversee and develop the infrastructure throughout the town of Kalakote.

=== Constituency ===
Kalakote constituency is one of the four constituencies in Rajouri district, with its headquarters located in Kalakote. The head of this constituency is known as the MLA (Member of Legislative Assembly). However, after the abrogation of Article 370 of the Indian Constitution, there has been a transition to Governor's rule in Jammu and Kashmir, and consequently, there are no MLAs representing constituencies, including Kalakote. The main objective of this constituency is to oversee the welfare and development of the entire tehsil.

== History ==
=== Kalakote town ===
Before independence, Kalakote was a small village with coal mines. In the beginning of the 1950s, a thermal power station was established at Kalakote to utilize the local coal resources. Colonies like Mine Colony and Thermal Colony were established for the residence of power plant workers. Shops and hotels were constructed to handle the influx of mine workers. However, after the commissioning of this project, it was found that the coal available at the site was not suitable for the project, resulting in its closure. Despite this, coal remains the primary resource of the Tehsil and is presently being exported outside.

=== Kalakote tehsil ===
During the 1970s, Kalakote and Nowshera were part of the same tehsil with the same constituency. However, it became increasingly difficult to manage both towns under a single administration due to Kalakote's vastness. As a result, separate tehsils and constituencies were allotted to Kalakote. On 23 March 2018, an additional Deputy Commissioner was appointed for Tehsil Kalakote.

== Geography ==
=== Kalakote Town ===
Kalakote town is located at 33.21°N 74.40°E with an area of 1.27 km^{2} (0.49 sq mi) and an average elevation of 700 m (2,300 ft). The town experiences a humid subtropical, dry climate with a yearly temperature of 28.16 °C (82.69 °F), which is 2.19% higher than the Indian average. Annually, it receives about 22.15 millimeters (0.87 inches) of precipitation over 28.48 rainy days (7.8% of the time). The Pincode of Kalakote is 185202.

=== Kalakote Tehsil ===
Kalakote tehsil shares its boundaries with Nowshera in the east, Reasi in the west, Rajouri and Kotranka in the north, and Sunderbani and Siot in the south. The tehsil covers an area of 413 km^{2} (159 sq mi) with an average elevation of 700 m (2,300 ft). It experiences a humid subtropical, dry climate, with a yearly temperature of 28.16 °C (82.69 °F), 2.19% higher than the Indian average. The region receives approximately 22.15 millimeters (0.87 inches) of precipitation annually, occurring over 28.48 rainy days (7.8% of the time). There are 68 villages and a town in the tehsil.

== Population ==
=== Kalakote town ===
As of the 2011 India census, Kalakote has a total population of 558 people, with 332 males and 226 females. The literacy rate in Kalakote village is 77.96%, with 82.83% of males and 70.80% of females being literate. The location code of Kalakote is 001514, and there are approximately 113 houses in the town.

=== Kalakote tehsil ===
Kalakote tehsil is predominantly urban, with the entire population residing in urban areas. According to the 2011 India census, the total population of Kalakote Tehsil was 72,667, comprising 37,864 males and 34,803 females, resulting in a sex ratio of 919 females per 1000 males. The population of children between the ages of 0–6 years was 12,768, making up 18% of the total population, with 6,842 male children and 5,926 female children in this age group. The child sex ratio in Kalakote Tehsil was reported to be 866, which is lower than the overall sex ratio of 919.

The tehsil comprises 69 villages and has a literacy rate of 59.13%. Out of a total of 35,418 literate individuals, 21,123 are male, and 14,295 are female. The working population in Kalakote was recorded at 38,661, with 20,899 men and 17,762 women. Among them, 5,395 individuals are engaged in cultivation, comprising 4,344 men and 1,051 women. Additionally, 718 people work as agricultural laborers in Kalakote, with 588 men and 130 women involved in this occupation.

- Male Percentage
- Female Percentage

== Religion ==
=== Kalakote town ===
Kalakote is a town with a majority Hindu population, constituting approximately 93.67% of its residents. The town also has a significant Sikh community, accounting for about 4.03% of the population, and a Muslim community representing 2.18% of the inhabitants. Kalakote is renowned for its diverse religious landscape, boasting a prominent Hindu temple, gurudwara, and a mosque.

=== Kalakote tehsil ===
The tehsil's population is predominantly composed of two major religious groups: Hindu and Muslim. These two religions together account for 94.63% of the total population, with Muslims constituting 48.60% and Hindus constituting 46.03%. The remaining 5.37% of the population follows other religions such as Sikhism and Christianity.

- Hindu Percentage
- Muslim Percentage
- Others

== Education ==
As of 2023, Kalakote tehsil in Jammu and Kashmir is equipped with educational institutions, including a government college, 47 government schools, and 19 private schools.

The notable educational institution in Kalakote tehsil is the Government Degree College Kalakote, which serves as the sole college in the tehsil.

Among the esteemed government schools in the area are:

- Government Higher Secondary School Kalakote
- Government Higher Secondary School Sailsui
- Government Higher Secondary School Solki

Some of the prominent private schools in the tehsil include:

- VSK High School Kalakote
- Indira High School Kalakote
- Gian Public School Kalakote

== Healthcare ==
Kalakote town has one main hospital, the CHC Kalakote, serving the healthcare needs of the local community. Additionally, there are three more hospitals currently under construction in different parts of the tehsil, aimed at further improving medical facilities in the area. For medical emergencies, some residents may need to seek treatment at GMC Rajouri, situated approximately 36 km (22 mi) away, or alternatively, at GMC Jammu, which is located around 107 km (66 mi) away. These larger medical institutions offer specialized services and advanced medical care, catering to a wider range of healthcare needs.

== Transport ==
Kalakote is a developing tehsil in Rajouri district, Jammu and Kashmir, where almost every village is now well-connected through a network of single-lane roads. The town of Kalakote is strategically located on the Rajouri Katra Highway, a significant roadway that links Kalakote to major towns such as Rajouri and the pilgrimage destination of Katra. Additionally, this highway facilitates access to 14 other villages within the tehsil, fostering better connectivity and transportation in the region.

The central transportation artery in Kalakote is a 22-kilometre (14 mi) single-lane road that connects the town directly to the NH-144A at Siot. This connection further enhances Kalakote's accessibility and integration with the broader national highway network.

For travelers from distant locations, the nearest airport to Kalakote is the Jammu Airport, situated at a distance of approximately 115 kilometres (71 mi) from the town. The airport serves as a crucial gateway for both domestic and international flights and is approximately a 3.5-hour drive from Kalakote.

For railway commuters, the nearest railway station to Kalakote is the Jammu Tawi railway station, positioned about 113 kilometres (70 mi) away from the town. The railway station offers connectivity to various parts of the country and is reachable via a 3.5-hour drive from Kalakote.

== Tourism ==
=== Manma Mata Cave ===
The Manma Mata Temple is a pilgrimage site that lies on Rajouri - Katra highway. This site is devoted to Mata Devi as it is believed that Manma Devi had arrived in this region for meditation purpose. Visitors will find a cave in proximity to this pilgrimage site. This place is 8.9 km (5.5 mi) away from town.

=== Panjnara Fort ===
Near Panjnara, a small village in tehsil Kalakote, is a temple locally known as ‘Pandu Kund’. It is a well-preserved temple of the Kashmiri architectural style in Jammu province. The large temple dates back to 9th-10th century A.D and is similar to Buniyar templend Deltha Mandir in Baramula district. It consists of main shrine, a rectangular peristyle with 55 cells facing to the courtyard and double chambered gateway in the middle of eastern wall. This place is 18 km (11 mi) away from town.

=== Tatta Pani ===
This place is famous for the hot spring whose water is believed to have healing powers. It is located at about 14 km (8.7 mi) from the Kalakote town. Thousands of people throng the place from June to ending November every year from within and outside the state to take a dip in springs. Tata Pani is around 14 km (8.7 mi) away from town.

=== Thermal Power Plant Kalakote ===
In the beginning of 1950s, a Thermal Power Station was established at Kalakote keeping in view the available coal resources. But after commissioning of this project, it was found that the coal available at site was not suitable for the project due to which, the project is closed at present. However, coal is the main resource of the Tehsil, which is presently being exported outside. Thermal Power Plant Kalakote is 0 km (0 mi) away from town.

== Notable people ==
- Abdul Samad - Indian cricketer

== See also ==
- Thermal Power Plant Kalakote
- Kalakote Assembly constituency
- Government Degree College, Kalakote
