= Tawi River =

River in India and Pakistan

Coordinates: 32.6842°N 74.4837°E

Tawi River Surajputri
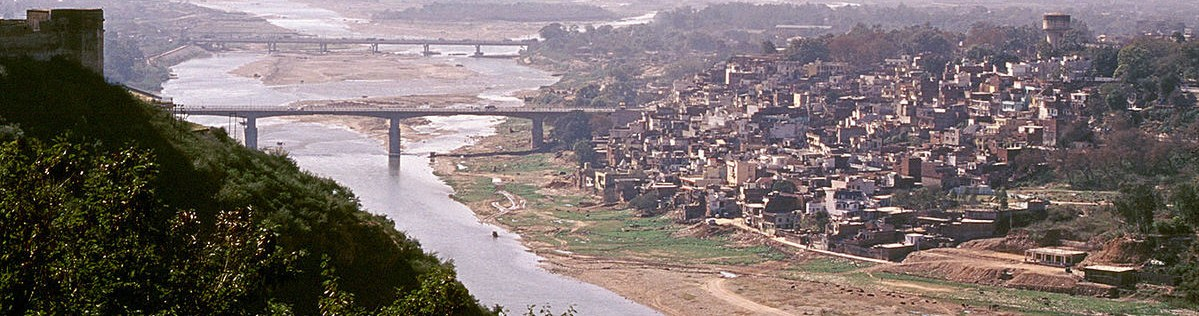

Location
- Country: India; Pakistan
- Regions: Jammu and Kashmir; Punjab

The Tawi is a river that flows through the Jammu region in the Indian-administered Jammu and Kashmir and Sialkot District of Punjab, Pakistan. The Tawi is a major left bank tributary of the river Chenab. Tawi is called as the "life line of Jammu city".

== Origin and course of flow ==
Tawi originates from the Kailash Kund glacier (also known as Kali Kund) in Bhaderwah, which lies in Doda district. Its catchment is delineated by latitude 32°35'-33°5'N and longitude 74°35'-75°45'E. It has a net catchment area of 2168 km² up till the Indian border. Elevation in the catchment varies between 400 and 4000 m.

The length of Tawi river is about 141 km (88 mi). The river in general flows through steep hills on either side excepting the lower reach for about 35 km (22 mi). The river is about 300 m (980 ft) wide at the bridge in Jammu city. The height of Gujjar Nagar bridge is 90m.

After traversing Jammu city, the river crosses into Punjab, Pakistan and joins Chenab river.

== Significance ==
The river holds religious prominence amongst the local populace of Jammu. Often referred to as "Suryaputri" i.e. 'Daughter of the Sun God' (in Hinduism, the sun god is Surya), the river finds mention in the ancient Hindu text of Vishnudharmottara Purana. As per local mythology, the river was brought to the city of Jammu by King Raja Pehar Devta in an effort to treat his sick father.

Despite the significant decline in Tawi's water levels and the increasing pollution which threatens its extinction, many locals still hold the river in reverence and perform religious functions on its banks.

== Artificial lake project ==
Jammu and Kashmir government is constructing an artificial lake on River Tawi at Bhagwati Nagar in Jammu to promote tourism and supply water to dry areas of the city. A team of Pakistani officials visited the site and studied the details of the project which will help allay any apprehensions about violation of provisions of Indus Water Treaty.

== See also ==
- Manawar Tawi River
