= Nowshera, Jammu and Kashmir =

Nowshera Naushera
- City
- Location in Jammu and Kashmir, India Nowshera (India)
- Coordinates: 33°9′36″N 74°14′24″E
- Country: India
- Union Territory: Jammu and Kashmir
- District: Rajouri
- Elevation: 325 m (1,066 ft)

Population (2011)
  - Total: 9,122

Languages
  - Official: Punjabi, Gojri, Dogri, Hindi, Urdu, Kashmiri, English
  - Spoken: Punjabi (Pahari dialect), Dogri, Gojri, Hindi, Urdu
- Time zone: UTC+5:30 (IST)
- PIN: 185151
- Vehicle registration: JK-11
- Literacy: 94.4%
- Website: rajouri.nic.in

Nowshera (alternatively spelt Nowshehra and Naushera) is a city and the headquarters of an eponymous tehsil of Rajouri district in the Jammu division of the Indian Union Territory of Jammu and Kashmir. It is located approx. 53 km from Rajouri City, the district headquarter. It is governed by a Municipal committee and in rural area of Nowshera consists of 14 panchayats governed by local bodies under the supervision of district administration Rajouri.

Nowshera city is widely known for its tradition of writing their language, Punjabi (Pahari dialect) in the Devanagari script.

== Geography ==
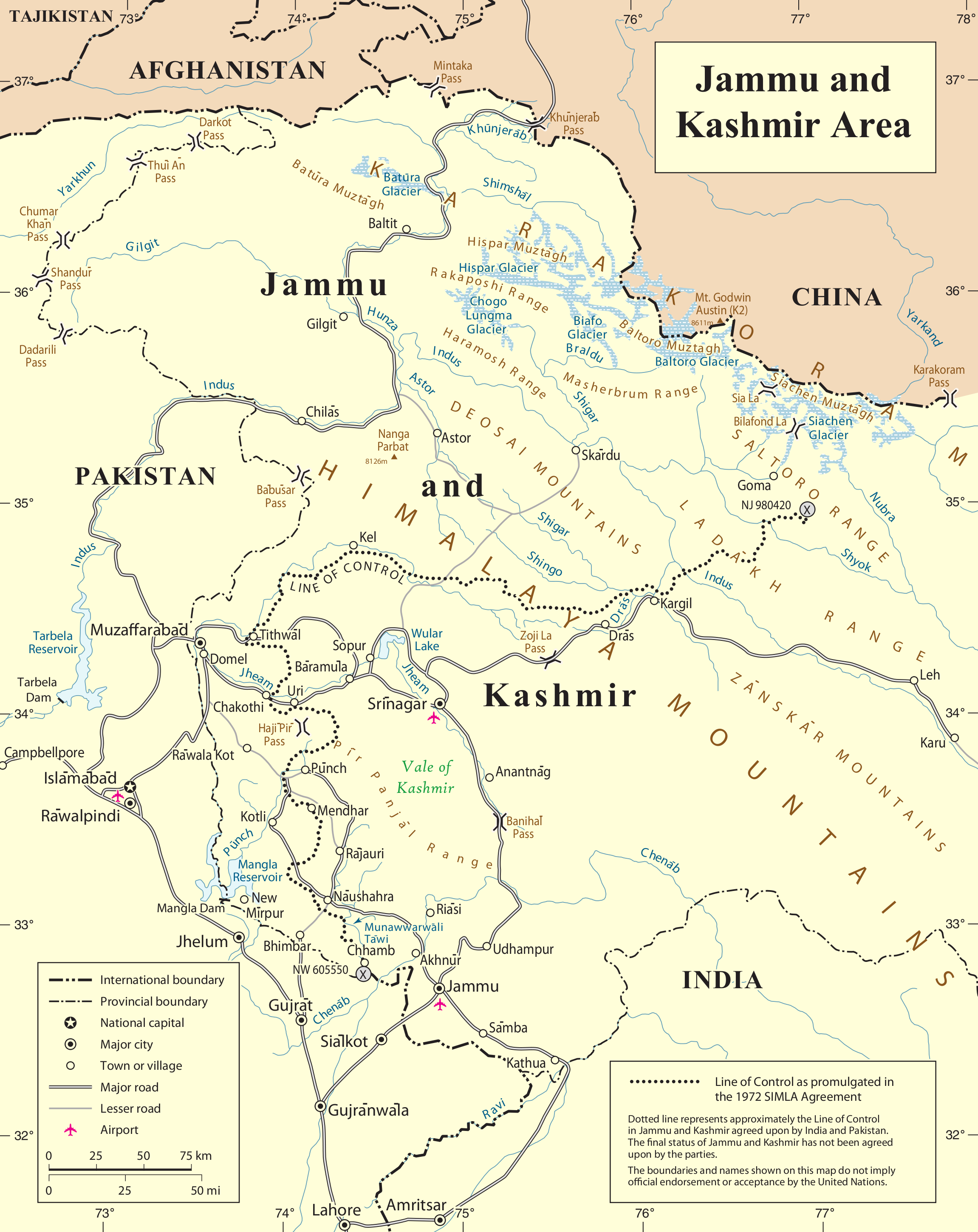
Naushera in the context of Mirpur and Poonch districts

Nowshera is a city located on the bank of the Manawer River just 4 km inwards from the Manawer bridge on Jammu–Poonch national highway. It is a border tehsil of Rajouri district with a vast areal and demographic extent.

Given its spatial and demographic extent, Nowshera has been given the status of a Sub-District. It is a beautiful place with a number of tourist attractions including the fort of Mangla Devi, holy cave temple of Mangla Mata, Famous Thakurdwara Temple in the city centre, Central Gurudwara of Sikhs in Nonial, Qila Darhal and other Dargahs and temples. The literacy rate of Nowshera is very high with a low male-female literacy gap that shows that there is a deep inclination of people towards education.

The city has an average elevation of about 325 metres (1,066 feet).

== History ==
Prior to the Partition of India, Nowshera was a subdivision in the Bhimber tehsil of the Mirpur district. A brigade of Jammu and Kashmir State troops was stationed here, with the responsibility of securing the whole of Mirpur and Poonch districts. Following the 1947 Poonch Rebellion and the First Kashmir War, Nowshera got separated from the Mirpur district. It was combined with the other 'liberated areas' of the Mirpur district and reconstituted into a new tehsil of the Poonch district.

In 1967, the Poonch and Nowshera districts were separated into independent districts by the efforts of late Beli Ram Sharma (former Minister and former MLA Nowshera). But after that, due to political pressure from the National Conference government and leadership of Rajouri, the district status of Nowshera was snatched and given to Rajouri (district) with Nowshera coming under. Nowshera is still suffering due to the political system of Jammu and Kashmir. 90% of district offices are functioning in Nowshera and were sanctioned previously due to the hard efforts of late Beli Ram Sharma and late Dr. Romesh Chander Sharma (both served as Ministers and MLA).

== Demographics ==
=== Religion ===
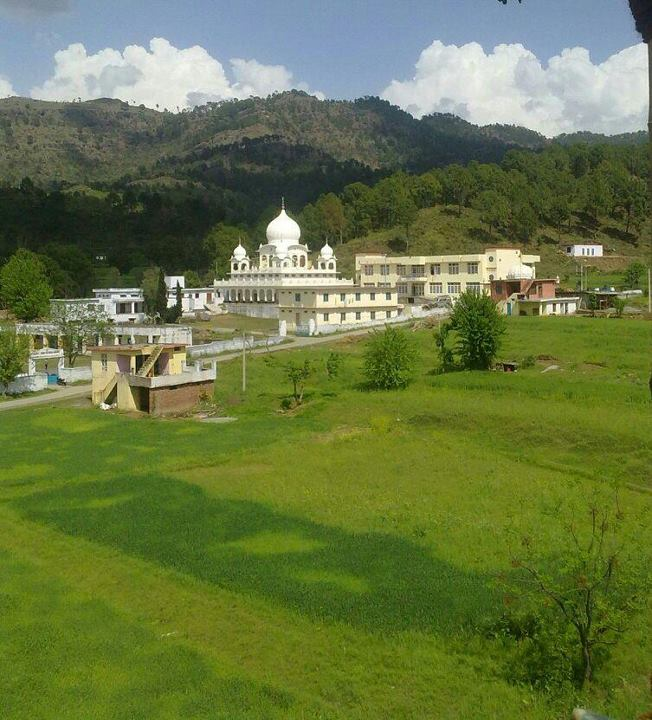
Central Sikh Gurudwara Nowshera Nonial, foundation stone was laid by Sant Baba Sunder Singh Ji (before independence) in Upper Nonial.

Religion in Nowshera City (2011)
1. Hinduism (75.5%)
2. Sikhism (15.0%)
3. Islam (8.58%)
4. Christianity (0.81%)
5. Buddhism (0.02%)
6. Jainism (0.02%)
7. Not Stated (0.06%)

As of 2011 India census, The total population of Nowshera city is 8,435.The city comprises 1500 houses and 225 shops and spreads on 1144 acre of land. It is situated on the north side of the fertile valley Nowshera about 300 ft above the right bank of Tawi River. The city is 124 km from Jammu and 45 km from Rajouri. It is tehsil headquarters and growth center of district. Presently, Nowshera tehsil comprises 58 villages. The total population of tehsil is about 62,000. Out of which more than 50% population is living below poverty line. Males constitute 52% of the population and females 48%. Nowshera has an average literacy rate of 79%, higher than the national average of 68% : male literacy is 82%, and female literacy is 76%. In Nowshera, 12% of the population is under 6 years of age. Tourist places in Nowshera are Mangla Devi, holy cave temple of Mangla Mata, Thakur Dwara (Khuwala) Nowshera, one of the biggest temples in the district of Rajouri, Thakur Dwara (Bhagwala) Sariya, Jamia Masjid, Ancient Mughliya Jahangiri Masjid, Khambah Fort (belongs to Mahabharata period, located on Indo-Pak border at zero point, Jhangar), Veer Badreshwar Temple, Central Gurudwara of Sikhs in Nonial, Qila Darhal and other Dargahs and temples among which Central Gurudwara of Sikhs is near to the city. The Jamia Masjid is also located in the city.

The natives of the city are predominantly Pahari Punjabi Hindus.

=== Language ===
Languages of Nowshera City (2011)
1. Punjabi (Pahari dialect) (57.3%)
2. Hindi (25.1%)
3. Others (18.5%)

Punjabi (Pahari dialect) is the most spoken language of the city, forming a clear majority, and is the native language of the city.

Due to settlement related to the tourism industry, non-Pahari speakers also constitute a significant minority. However, the city's native population is almost entirely composed of Pahari Punjabi speakers.

In the city, native Hindus, predominantly write their native language, Punjabi, in the Devanagari script instead of Gurmukhi. A small Punjabi-speaking Sikh minority, however, mostly prefers the Gurmukhi script, consisting primarily of migrants from the Punjab.

== Education ==
Nowshera is home to several educational institutions. Major ones being Government Degree College and New National Public Higher Secondary School.

== Degree College Nowshera ==
This college started functioning in 2008 with an enrollment of 233. It was opened in the premises of Govt. Boys Middle School, Nowshera with four classrooms under makeshift arrangement from the academic session started in June 2008. It was sanctioned by then MLA and Minister, Dr Romesh Chander Sharma, total 230 students were enrolled in B.A. Part-1 during that session. So far, the college worked under the supervision of Prof. Gopal Gupta who managed the affairs of GDC, Nowshera being in the capacity of Nodal Principal for first two months. Dr Nutan Resutra was the first formal head of this institution from 07-07-2008 to 14-06-2009. He was instrumental in managing all activities in the first formative years of this prime institution. After his transfer, Prof. Zahoor A. Bhat took over that responsibility and delivered his services till 18-04-2010. Presently, Prof. S.P. Chopra has taken over as third Principal of this college from 22-04-2010. Now, it has been shifted to a newly constructed building sanctioned by then MLA Radhay Sham Sharma, which is containing all modern facilities for students. B.Sc medical and non-medical subjects are also introduced. The new building is near Radio station. College got B++ NACC rating when recently National Assessment and Accreditation Council (NACC) peer team visited the College for assessment in 2022.

== Transport ==
=== Road ===
Nowshera is well-connected by road to other places in Jammu and Kashmir and India by the NH 144A.

=== Rail ===
Nowshehra doesn't have its own railway station. The nearest railway station is Jammu Tawi railway station located at a distance of 110 kilometres.

=== Air ===
The nearest airport is Jammu Airport located at a distance of 110 kilometres.

=== Notable personalities ===
- Deputy Chief Minister Sh. Surinder Choudhary (politician)
- Ex-member legislative assembly Sh. Ravinder Raina (politician)
