= Rajouri district =

- District of Jammu and Kashmir administered by India
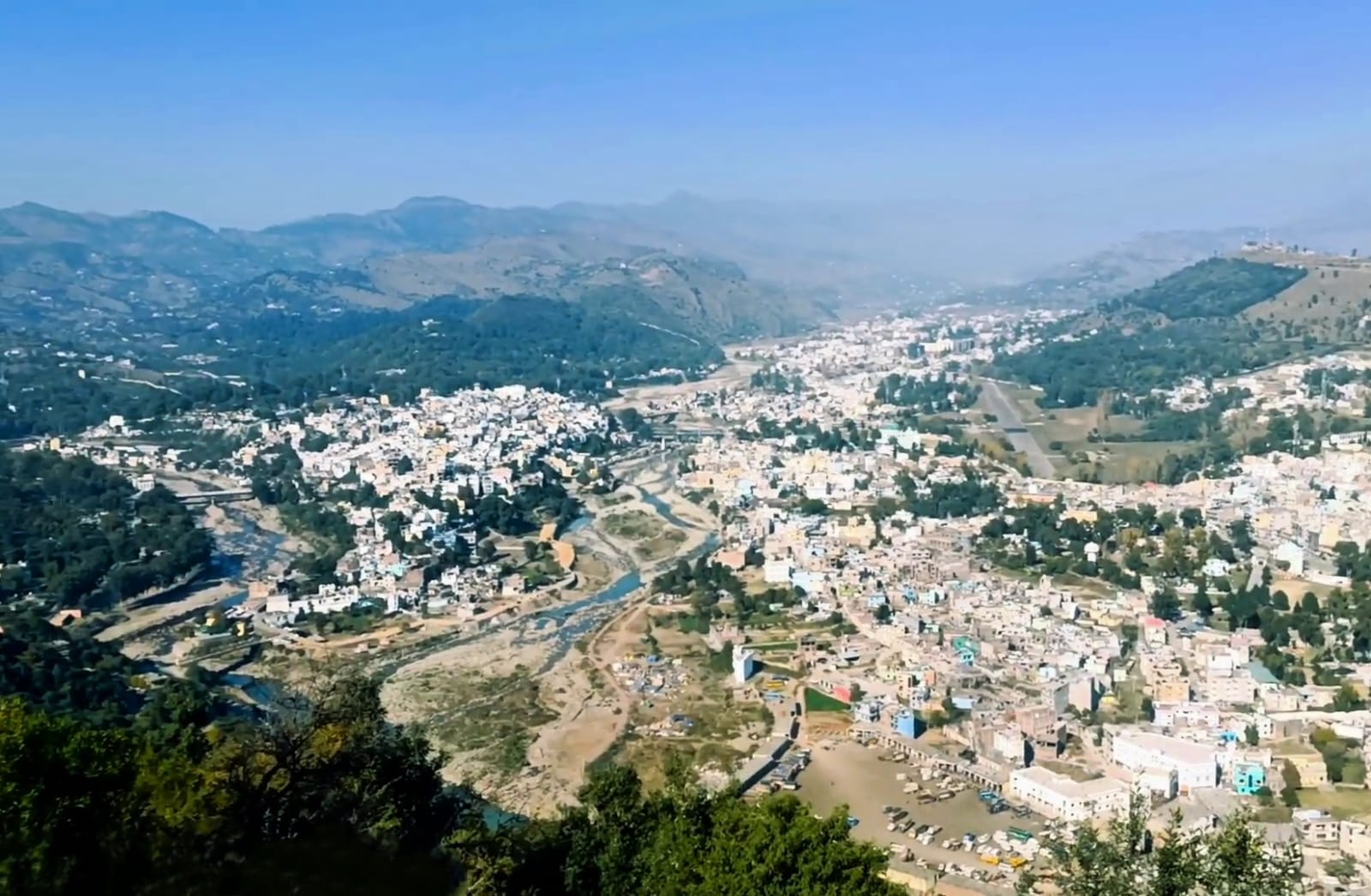
- Aerial view of Rajouri city
- Interactive map of Rajouri district
- Rajouri district is in the Jammu division (shown with neon blue boundary) of Indian-administered Jammu and Kashmir (shaded in tan in the disputed Kashmir region
- Coordinates (Rajouri): 33.38°N 74.31°E
- Administering country: India
- Union Territory: Jammu and Kashmir
- Division: Jammu
- Headquarters: Rajouri
- Tehsils: 1.Rajouri 2.Manjakote 3.Darhal 4.Qila Darhal 5.Thana Mandi 6.Kotranka 7.Khawas 8.Teryath 9.Kalakote 10.Beri Pattan 11.Sunderbani 12.Nowshera 13.Siot

Government
  - Vidhan Sabha constituencies: 5 seats

Area
  - Total: 2,630 km^{2} (1,020 sq mi)

Population (2011)
  - Total: 642,415
  - Density: 244/km^{2} (633/sq mi)
  - Urban: 8.1%

Demographics
  - Literacy: 68.17%
  - Sex ratio: 860

Languages
  - Official: Dogri, Kashmiri, Urdu, Hindi, English
  - Spoken: Pahari, Gujari
- Time zone: UTC+05:30 (IST)
- Vehicle registration: JK-11
- Website: rajouri.nic.in

Rajouri district is a district in the Jammu division of Indian union territory of Jammu and Kashmir, in the larger disputed Kashmir region. The Line of Control, between the Indian- and Pakistani-administered Jammu and Kashmir, lies to its west, Poonch to its north, the Reasi district to the east and the Jammu district to its south. Rajouri is famous for its "Kalari" (made from milk). Representing an ancient principality, Rajouri was a joint district, along with Reasi, at the time of princely state's accession to India in 1947. The two tehsils were separated and Rajouri was merged with the Poonch district. Rajouri again became a separate district along with Reasi in 1968 till 2006 when both were separated again. The Rajouri district comprises 13 tehsils (boroughs).

== History ==
=== Ancient history ===
According to some historians, a second branch of Aryan emigrants crossed the Himalayas in the north and west and settled in Rajouri and Poonch area. Rajouri, Bhimber Gali and Naushera were integrated within the territory of Abhisar, which was one of the hill states of the Punjab Kingdom. Early records of incomplete nature show that in the 4th century B.C.E., there existed in the northwest of India a federal political setup, in which Abhisar, with its capital Rajouri, was also incorporated. At the time of Alexander's invasion, Rajouri was at the summit of its splendour. In the Mauryan period, the town of Rajouri was a great trade centre.

=== Kashmir Sultanate ===
Rajouri came under the suzerainty of the Kashmir Sultanate during the 15th century through the military campaigns of General Malik Tazi Bhat. In 1475, he led conquests that brought Rajouri, along with Poonch, Jammu, Bhimber, Jhelum, Sialkot, and Gujrat, under the administrative control of the Kashmiri Sultan. Local rulers retained limited autonomy but were required to acknowledge the Sultan’s authority and provide tribute and military support. This vassal arrangement continued until the late 16th century, when Mughal Emperor Akbar annexed Kashmir in 1586, ending Kashmir’s control over Rajouri.

=== Modern history ===
In 1813, Gulab Singh of Jammu captured Rajouri for the Sikh Empire of Maharaja Ranjit Singh by defeating Raja Agar Ullah Khan. After this, Rajouri became part of the Sikh Empire. Parts of it were given as jagirs to Rahim Ullah Khan (a half-brother of Agar Ullah Khan) and other parts to Gulab Singh.

Following the First Anglo-Sikh War and the Treaty of Amritsar (1846), all the territories between the Ravi River and Indus were transferred to Gulab Singh, and he was recognised as an independent Maharaja of Jammu and Kashmir. Thus Rajouri became a part of the princely state of Jammu and Kashmir. Gulab Singh changed the name of Rajouri to Rampur. He appointed Mian Hathu as Governor of Rajouri, who remained in Rajouri up to 1856. Mian Hathu constructed a stunning temple in between Thanna Nallah in close proximity to Rajouri city. He also built Rajouri Fort at Dhannidhar village.

After Mian Hathu, Rajouri was transformed into a tehsil and affiliated with Bhimber district. In 1904, this tehsil was separated from Bhimber and affiliated with the Reasi district.

=== Partition ===
After the Partition of India and the accession of Jammu and Kashmir to India in October 1947, there followed the First Kashmir War between India and Pakistan. The Pakistani raiders, along with the rebels and deserters from the western districts of the state, captured Rajauri on 7 November 1947. The 30,000 Hindus and Sikhs living in Rajauri were reportedly killed, wounded or abducted. Rajauri was recaptured on 12 April 1948 by the 19 Infantry Brigade of the Indian Army under the command of Second Lieutenant Rama Raghoba Rane. Rane, despite being wounded, launched a bold tank assault by conveying the tanks over the Tawi river bed in order to avoid the road blocks along the main road. (Note: Rama Raghoba Rane received a Param Vir Chakra for his gallantry.) When the Indian Army entered the town, the captors had fled, having destroyed most of the town and killing all its inhabitants. After the arrival of the Army, some 1,500 refugees that had fled to the hills, including women and children, returned to the town.

The ceasefire line at the end of the war ran to the west of the Rajouri district.

=== Inside India ===
Soon after the war, the Rajouri and Reasi tehsils were separated. The Rajouri tehsil was merged with the Indian-administered Poonch district to form the Poonch-Rajouri district. The Reasi tehsil was merged with the Udhampur district. On 1 January 1968, the two tehsils were reunited and the resulting district was named the Rajouri district.

The Reasi tehsil was also separated out in 2006 into a separate Reasi district. The present Rajouri district comprises the 1947 Rajouri tehsil.

=== Pakistan Air Force airstrike ===
On 27 February 2019, Pakistan Air Force (PAF) crossed the Line of Control and carried out airstrikes against multiple targets in Rajouri district. Pakistan Air Force officials asserted that their target was the Indian military's supply depot and had struck 6 locations in Indian-administered Jammu and Kashmir. PAF officials claimed that they successfully achieved their targets. Indian military officials confirmed that the airstrike took place and identified Narian, Lam Jhangar and Kerri in Rajouri district, and Hamiphur area in Poonch district as the targets of the attacks. Indian military officials further stated that the bombs landed in deserted area and caused no damage. Indian Army 25 division headquarters and ammunition and supply depot were the intended targets of the airstrikes as per Indian military officials' claims.

=== 2023 Rajouri attacks ===
For over a decade, terrorism had primarily been confined to the tumultuous Kashmir Valley with some isolated incidents in other parts of J&K. But that trend changed in 2023 when militants killed seven people in the border district of Rajouri, the first such major attack in the Jammu division in years. It marked the beginning of a worrying shift in Kashmir’s militancy. On 1 January 2023, some militants broke into three houses in Dhangri village of Rajouri district and opened fire on civilians, resulting into death of four and injuring others. On 2 January 2023, an Improvised Explosive Device (IED) blasted near the same attack site, resulting in the death of a child and injuring five people.

== Demographics ==
=== Population ===
Historical population
Year	Pop.	±%
1901	136,281	—
1911	146,823	+7.7%
1921	157,430	+7.2%
1931	166,126	+5.5%
1941	184,049	+10.8%
1951	177,789	−3.4%
1961	171,529	−3.5%
1971	217,373	+26.7%
1981	302,500	+39.2%
1991	384,435	+27.1%
2001	483,284	+25.7%
2011	642,415	+32.9%
† 1951 and 1991 populations are estimated Source: Census of India

According to the 2011 census Rajouri district has a population of 642,415. This gives it a ranking of 518th in India (out of a total of 640). The district has a population density of 235 inhabitants per square kilometre (610/sq mi). Its population growth rate over the decade 2001–2011 was 28.14%. Rajouri has a sex ratio of 863 females for every 1000 males (which varies with religion), and a literacy rate of 68.54%. 8.14% of the population lives in urban areas. The Scheduled Castes and Scheduled Tribes account for 7.5% and 36.2% of the population of the district.

=== Social groups ===
Gurjar is a major ethnic group along with Bakarwal of the Rajouri district they make up around 50% of the district's total population. Other groups in the district are Paharis, Kashmiris and Dogras.

=== Language ===
Languages of Rajouri district (2011)
1. Punjabi (Pahari dialect) (55.4%)
2. Gojri (35.2%)
3. Hindi (2.94%)
4. Kashmiri (2.22%)
5. Dogri (1.69%)
6. Others (2.56%)

Pahari and Gujari are two major languages spoken in Rajouri. Pahari is mainly spoken by the Pahari community (both Muslim and Hindu) and Gujjars. Gujari is mainly spoken by the Muslim Gujjars and Bakarwal which contribute as largest group of Rajouri district. Kashmiri and Dogri are both spoken by small minorities. Though Urdu and English are the main mediums of instruction.

=== Religion ===
Religion in Rajouri district (2011)
Religion	Percent
Islam	62.71%
Hinduism	34.54%
Sikhism	2.41%
Other or not stated	0.34%

Tehsil	Muslim	Hindu	Sikh	Others
Thanamandi	99.1	0.65	0.02	0.23
Darhal	99.21	0.39	0.00	0.40
Rajauri	70.24	27.88	1.58	0.30
Budhal	83.68	15.92	0.19	0.21
Kalakote	51.6	48.03	0.26	0.11
Nowshehra	21.69	65.99	11.52	0.80
Sunderbani	11.11	85.79	2.77	0.33

Sex Ratio in Rajouri District in 2011 Census. (no. females per 1,000 males)
Religion (and population)	Sex Ratio
Muslim (pop 402,879)	923
Hindu (pop 221,880)	776
Sikh (pop 15,513)	646
Other (pop 2,143)	476
Total (pop 642,415)	860

Rajouri district: religion, gender ratio, and % urban of population, according to the 2011 Census.
	Hindu	Muslim	Christian	Sikh	Buddhist	Jain	Other	Not stated	Total
Total	221,880	402,879	983	15,513	189	26	3	942	642,415
Total	34.54%	62.71%	0.15%	2.41%	0.03%	0.00%	0.00%	0.15%	100.00%
Male	124,925	209,548	730	9,426	165	18	2	537	345,351
Female	96,955	193,331	253	6,087	24	8	1	405	297,064
Gender ratio (% female)	43.7%	48.0%	25.7%	39.2%	12.7%	30.8%	33.3%	43.0%	46.2%
Sex ratio (no. of females per 1,000 males)	776	923	347	646	–	–	–	754	860
Urban	31,243	17,244	278	3,452	32	7	1	57	52,314
Rural	190,637	385,635	705	12,061	157	19	2	885	590,101
% Urban	14.1%	4.3%	28.3%	22.3%	16.9%	26.9%	33.3%	6.1%	8.1%

== Geography ==
Rajouri district

The Rajouri district is bordered on the west by Pakistan-controlled Azad Kashmir's Kotli district, on the north by the Indian-controlled part of Poonch district, on the east by the Reasi district and on the south by Jammu district.

The northern parts of the Rajouri district are in the Pir Panjal range, especially the Thanamandi and Darhal tehsils. However, The Rajouri Tawi River (also called Naushera Tawi) and its many tributaries flow through the mountain valleys, making them habitable. The Ansi River similarly waters the Budhal tehsil.

In the south, there is a wide valley between the Tain Dhar and Kali Dhar ranges (part of the Outer Hills of the Himalayas), which is called either Naushera Valley or Lam-Khuiratta Valley. In between these two ranges, there is a lower range called Koti Dhar, which divides the valley into two parts. The Line of Control between the Indian-administered and Pakistani-administered Kashmir regions runs along the southern Kali Dhar range for part of the way and the Koti Dhar range for the rest.

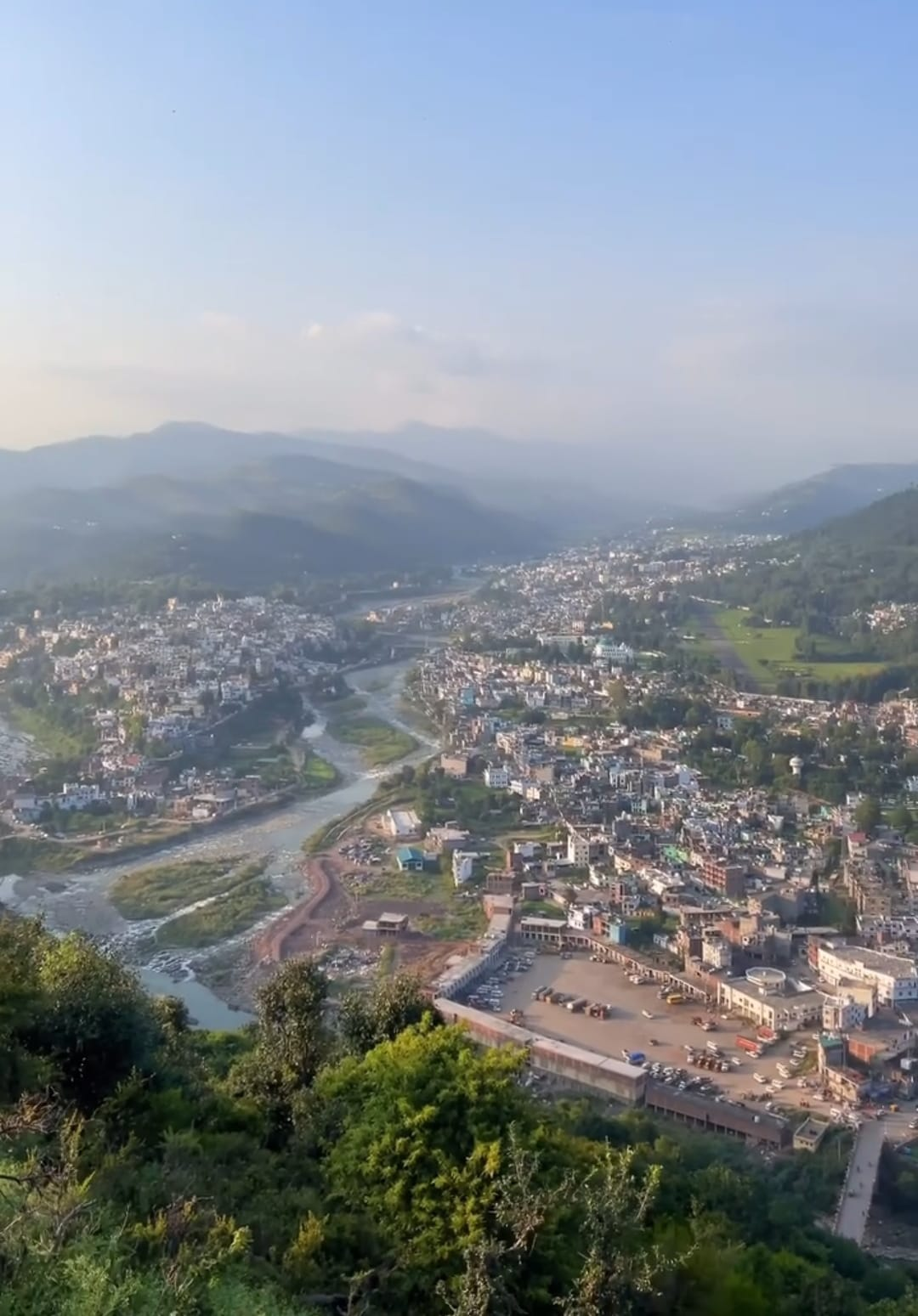
Rajouri city.

The old Mughal Road into the Kashmir Valley used to come up from Bhimber, and pass through the Naushera and Rajouri towns to the Pir Panjal Pass. This is now cut off by the Line of Control. Also cut off is the roadway between Sunderbani and Kotli, which used to run in the Lam-Khuiratta valley.

== Agriculture ==
The land is mostly fertile and mountainous. Maize, wheat and rice are the main crops of the area and the main source of the irrigation is the river Tawi that originates from the mountains of Pir Panjal.

== Organisation ==
The Rajouri district comprises the subdistrict sunderbani, nowshera, Kotranka, kalakote & tehsils are Rajouri, Darhal, Sunderbani, Budhal, kotranka, khawas, Manjakote Nowshera, Thanamandi, and Kalakot.

There are 19 blocks: Rajouri, Darhal, kotranka Sunderbani, Doongi, Nowshera, Kalakote, Manjakote, Thanamandi and Budhal, Dhangri, Khawas, Lamberi, Moghla, Panjgrain, Plangar, Qila darhal, Rajnagar, Seri, Siot. Each block consists of a number of panchayats.

During recent reviews conducted by administration. It is planned to construct 400/132kv & 400/220 kv station at Rajori to resolve the electrical power supply to the statved area of Rajouri, Poonch Mendhar. This Grid station will be based on latest GIS technology of electrical technology.

Rajouri has its own deemed University Baba Ghulam Shah Badshah University popularly known as BGSBU which offers various Diploma, UG and PG courses. It also has one Government Medical College GMC Rajouri along with other degree colleges.

== Politics ==
The district has five assembly constituencies: Nowshera, Budhal, Thannamandi, Rajouri and Kalakote, and 14 district development council constituencies: Budhal New, Budhal Old-A, Budhal Old-B, Darhal, Dhangri, Doongi, Kalakote, Manjakote, Moughla, Nowshera, Rajouri, Seri, Sunderbani and Thanamandi. Rajouri District (except Kalakote, which falls under the Jammu Lok Sabha constituency), comes under Anantnag-Rajouri Lok Sabha Constituency.

== Notable people ==
- Banda Singh Bahadur, a famous sikh warrior and a commander of the Khalsa army
- Ravinder Raina, Ex-BJP state president, J&K.
- Nadeem Iqbal, a cross country skier.
- Shakeel Ahmed, Scientist.
- Arjumman Mughal, Indian actress.
- Peter Qasim, the longest-serving detainee in Australian immigration detention.
- Abdul Samad Farooq, Indian cricketeer
- Dr. Shahid Iqbal, IAS.
- Chowdhary Mohmmad Hussain, Indian Politician.

== See also ==
- Ghari Momin
- Azmatabad
- Kalakote
- 2023 Rajouri Terror attacks

== Bibliography ==
- Cheema, Brig Amar (2015), The Crimson Chinar: The Kashmir Conflict: A Politico Military Perspective, Lancer Publishers, ISBN 978-81-7062-301-4
- Panikkar, K. M. (1930), Gulab Singh, London: Martin Hopkinson Ltd
- Ramachandran, D. P. (2008), Empire's First Soldiers, Lancer Publishers, pp. 171–, ISBN 978-0-9796174-7-8
- Sarkar, Col. Bhaskar (2016), Outstanding Victories of the Indian Army, 1947-1971, Lancer Publishers, pp. 40–, ISBN 978-1-897829-73-8
- Singh, V. K. (2005), Leadership in the Indian Army: Biographies of Twelve Soldiers, SAGE Publications, pp. 160–, ISBN 978-0-7619-3322-9
