= Chandimarh =

- Village
- Nickname: CM
- Location in Jammu and Kashmir, India Chandimarh (India)
- Coordinates: 33.61°N 74.4°E
- Country: India
- Union Territory: Jammu and Kashmir
- District: Poonch
- Tehsil: Surankote
- Elevation: 1,580 m (5,180 ft)

Population (2011)
  - Total: 3,870

Languages
  - Official: Urdu, English
  - Spoken: Pahari, Gojri, Kashmiri
- Time zone: UTC+5:30 (IST)
- PIN: 185121
- Literacy: 62.05%

Chandimarh or Chandi Marh is a village in Poonch district, Jammu and Kashmir, India, situated between Noori Chamb and Bufliaz Block. It is 26 km east of the district headquarters Poonch, and 22 km from sub-district headquarter Surankote. Nearby towns and they are; Thanamandi town towards South, Surankote tehsil towards North, Balakote Block towards west, Darhal Block towards South.

== Population ==
According to the 2011 Census of India, there are 700 households in the village, with a total population of 3870, of which 2017 are males and 1853 are females.

== Transport ==
=== Air ===
The nearest airports to Chandimarh are Jammu Airport and Srinagar International Airport, located 205 and 125 kilometres respectively.

=== Rail ===
Chandimarh doesn't have a railway station. The nearest railway station is Anantnag railway station located at a distance of 106 kilometres and nearest major railway station is Jammu Tawi railway station located at a distance of 203 kilometres.

=== Road ===
Chandimarh is connected by road through the Mughal Road and NH 144A with other places in Jammu and Kashmir.
