= Noori Chamb =

- Interactive map of Noori Chamb
- Location: Poonch, Jammu and Kashmir, India
- Coordinates: 33.6086°N 74.4181°E

Noori Chamb is a waterfall in the headwaters of the Poonch River in Poonch district of Jammu and Kashmir in India. It is named after the Mughal queen Nur Jahan.

Noori Chamb is located near the hill village of Bahramgala below Pir Panjal Pass (Peer Ki Gali) in the Poonch district. It is at a distance of 10 km from Bufliaz. The Mughal Road passes next to it.

This place is linked with the Mughal history. According to local legends, it is named after Nur Jahan, the wife of emperor Jehangir. "Chamb" in local terminology is water fall. On the way to Kashmir, Nur Jahan used to bath in the waterfall.

Noori Chamb is the 2nd tallest plunge waterfall and a tourist attraction in Poonch district of Jammu and Kashmir.

== See also ==
- Mughal Road
- Peer Ki Gali
- Surankote Tehsil
- Bufliaz
