= Mast Gul =

Pakistani militant (born c. 1966)

- Born: Haroon Khan; 1966 (age 59–60)
- Occupation: Militant
- Organization(s): Hizbul Mujahideen (until 2001); Tehreek-e-Taliban
- Known for: Charar-e-Sharief siege

Haroon Khan (born c. 1966), better known by his nom-de-guerre as Mast Gul or Major Mast Gul, is a Pakistani militant and the former member of Hizbul Mujahideen. He is best known for his role in the Charar-e-Sharief siege in 1995, one of the prominent events during the insurgency in Jammu and Kashmir. He was also associated with the militant group Harkat-ul-Ansar, which was active in Kashmir during the 1990s.

== Early life ==
Gul was born in 1966 in Kurram District, Pakistan. Little is known about his early life.

== Charar-e-Sharief siege ==
Gul was also accused of involvement in the Hazratbal siege in 1993. He, according to Alpana Kishore, a Newslaundry journalist, was the "first Pakistani militant to be captured on camera in Kashmir", following the 1993 Hazratbal siege" in Srinagar.

In December 1994, Gul and his group of militants entered the town of Charari Sharief, Jammu and Kashmir. They established a retreat near the Charar-e-Sharief shrine. The group fortified their positions, with Gul presenting himself as a protector of the shrine. The situation escalated into a 66-day standoff with Indian security forces in early 1995. Intelligence reports indicated the presence of heavily armed militants in the town. Indian authorities reportedly attempted to offer safe passage to the militants.

On 11 May 1995, the siege ended with a fire that engulfed the 14th-century shrine and much of the surrounding town in Budgam district. Over 1,300 homes were reportedly destroyed, and thousands of residents were displaced. Indian security forces claimed to have killed 25 militants during the operation, though some reports suggest that civilians were among the casualties. Gul escaped during the chaos, with conflicting accounts on how he evaded capture. Later, rumours circulated about a potential agreement between the Indian security agencies and militants during the Charar-e-Sharief stand-off. However, officials, such as CD Sahay, the former head of the Research and Analysis Wing (R&AW), declined the claims.

=== Escape ===
During the intervening night of 11 and 12 May 1995, the Charar-e-Sharief shrine and khanqah mysteriously caught fire, forcing militants who had been holed up inside to emerge into the open. Gul's escape contributed to his prominence in the Kashmir Valley, with posters of him appearing on walls in the region. His cap, hairstyle, and attire became widely popular among his supporters, influencing the appearance of militants for years. Local media and conservative Muslim public intellectuals portrayed him as a war hero.

He returned to Pakistan following the Charar-e-Sharief siege. Former union minister Jaswant Singh presented an alternative account of Gul's escape, stating that he was escorted to the Line of Control, where he was met by large crowds as he crossed into Muzaffarabad from Chakothi on 2 August 1995, three months after the arson.

== Activities in Pakistan ==
In February 2014 after a period of inactivity, he was accused of carrying out a series of attacks in Khyber Pakhtunkhwa Province. He has reportedly been associated with the Inter-Services Intelligence (ISI) and the Jamaat-e-Islami after returning to Pakistan. He was disassociated from Hizbul Mujahideen in 2001 due to his association with Tehreek-e-Taliban under which he reportedly carried out the 2014 Peshawar Hotel attack. He, according to the Indian newspaper such as Hindustan Times, was declared by Pakistani authorities as a "most wanted terrorist" following his involvement in activities within the country.

After the 9/11 attacks, rumors circulated that Gul had lost a leg in a landmine explosion while engaging against foreign troops in Afghanistan. Prior to his involvement with the Tehreek-e-Taliban Pakistan (TTP) in the following years, he had owned a car showroom in Peshawar and was a businessman in the area.

== Attempted assassination ==
In August 2003, Gul escaped an assassination attempt when his car was ambushed by a group of armed men near his home in Khwaja town, Peshawar. While traveling with his security team, 10 attackers opened fire on his vehicle. Gul suffered facial injuries.

His brother, Ismail Khan, accused Research and Analysis Wing (R&AW) for the attack and accused former Afghan officials Haji Zaman and Haji Aman of being involved.
