= Yusmarg =

Yousmarg
- Hill station
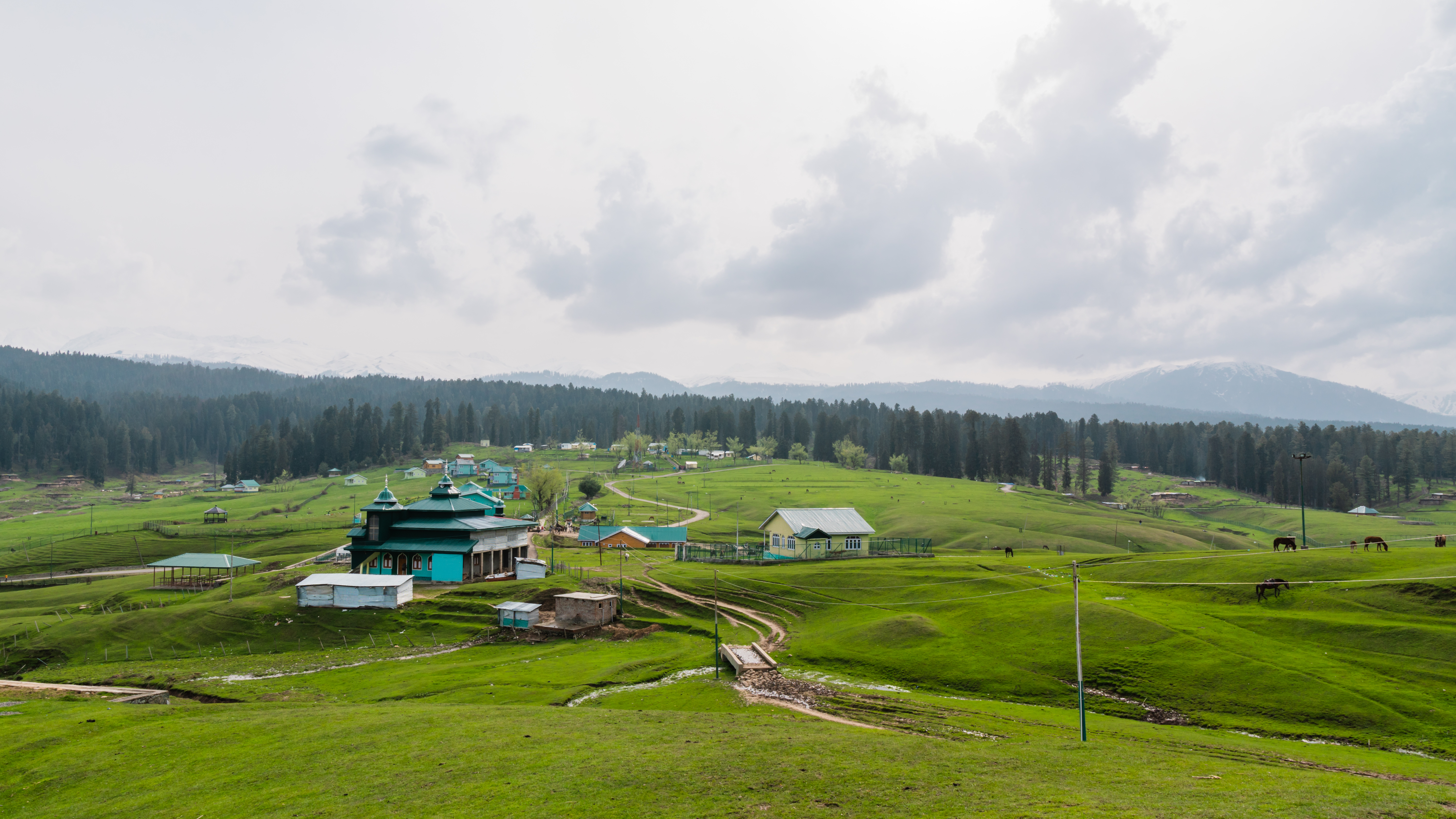
- View of Yusmarg in Budgam district (J&K)

- Location in Jammu & Kashmir, India Yousmarg (India)
- Coordinates: 33.83°N 75.30°E
- Country: India
- Union Territory: Jammu and Kashmir
- District: Budgam
- Elevation: 2,396 m (7,861 ft)

Languages
  - Official: Kashmiri, Urdu, Hindi, Dogri, English
- Time zone: UTC+5:30 (IST)
- Postal code: 191112
- Vehicle registration: JK04
- Website: www.budgam.nic.in/tourist-place/yusmarg

Yusmarg or Yousmarg (Urdu pronunciation: [juːsməɾɡ]; Kashmiri pronunciation: [juːsmarɨɡ]) is a hill station in the western part of the Budgam district of Jammu and Kashmir, India. It is situated 43 km from Budgam town and 53 km (33 mi) south of Srinagar, the summer capital of the state.

== Geography ==
Yusmarg is an alpine valley covered with snow-clad mountains and the meadows of Pine and Fir. It lies 18 km (11 mi) south of Charari Sharief, a town in the Budgam district of Jammu and Kashmir. It is situated at the bank of the Doodganga River, which is a tributary of the Jehlum River. It is located in the Pir Panjal peaks, a sub-range of the Himalaya. The Peaks are: the Sunset Peak and the Trattekoot Peak, for which the expeditions lead from this hill station. It lies at an altitude of 2,396 m (7,861 ft) above sea level.

== Tourism ==
A trek of 4 kilometres (2.5 mi) leads to a small lake called Nilnag, famous for its blue water. A 10-kilometer (6.2 miles) trek leads to the frozen lake in Sang-e-Safed valley, which is mostly covered by ice even during the summer. Other tourist activities include horse riding, fishing, skiing during winter and photography.

== Access ==
Yusmarg is easily accessed from Srinagar or Srinagar Airport (SXR), the capital of Jammu and Kashmir, 47 kilometres (29 mi). The drive in under 2 hours by car or bus leads through Charari Sharief town.

== COVID-19 ==
During COVID-19, teachers of High School Kandajan in Yusmarg area started open-air community classes to make up for the losses due to the pandemic.

== See also ==
- Sonamarg
- Gulmarg
- Charari Sharief
- Dodh Pathri
