= Surankote (town) =

Surankote Swarnkot
- Town
- Location in Jammu and Kashmir, India Surankote (India)
- Coordinates: 33.64°N 74.25°E
- Country: India
- Union Territory: Jammu and Kashmir
- District: Poonch

Government
  - MLA: Choudhary Akram Lassanvi
- Elevation: 1,580 m (5,180 ft)

Languages
  - Official: Gojri, Dogri, English, Kashmiri, Urdu
  - Spoken: Pahari, Gojri, Kashmiri
- Time zone: UTC+5:30 (IST)
- PIN: 185121
- Website: poonch.nic.in

Surankote (Urdu pronunciation: [s̪uːɾənˌkoːʈ]) is a town in the Surankote Tehsil of the Poonch district of the Indian union territory of Jammu and Kashmir in the disputed Kashmir region. It occupies the Surankote valley, located between the Pir Panjal and ranges within the Himalayas. It receives snowfall in winters. It is famous for the existence of lakes (9 major and few small) on the Pir Panjal range which are not still connected with the outside world. Although some people visit these lakes by foot for recreation and refreshment.

== Geography ==
Surankote township is located at some 27 kilometres to the south-east of Poonch city and 221 kilometres from winter capital Jammu. The valley comprises 33 villages. The total projected population of the valley is 124,755 which includes Paharis, Gujjars, Bakerwals and a visible Kashmiri minority. Twenty-four villages are located on the western slopes of the main Pir Panjal range while 19 villages are found on the slopes of the Rattan Panchal range. The climatic conditions resemble that of Kashmir. Some high peaks of this valley can be seen from Lahore on a very clear day the highest peak is Tatakuti standing at 15502 ft. With crystal-clear water, the alpine lakes viz. Sukhsar, Neelsar, Bhagsar, Katorasar, Kaldachnisar and Nandansar, fall in this region. The historical waterfalls, Noori chamb falls in Behramgala of this region. In local dialect the passes, alpine lakes and meadows are called gallies, sars and margs or dhoks respectively. Some of the common dhoks in Poonch are Girjan, Panjtari, Isanwali, Nainsukh, Dharamarg, Pirmarg and Sarimastan etc.

== Demographics ==
Religion in Surnakote (2011)
1. Islam (86.5%)
2. Hinduism (11.9%)
3. Sikhism (0.93%)
4. Christianity (0.40%)
5. Jainism (0.01%)
6. Not Stated (0.16%)

As of the 2011 census Surankot has a population of 8,892. Males constitute 53% of the population while females form 47% share. The average literacy is 73%.

Islam is followed by almost 86% population. Paharis are an agricultural tribe and are estimated to be the largest community living in Surankote.

== Tourist attractions ==
=== Noori Chamb ===
Noori Chamb associated with the name of Mughal Queen Nur Jahan is known for its waterfall. It is situated near Behram Galla in Surankote Tehsil about 45 kilometres from Poonch town. The fall of the stream gives rise to dense clouds of water vapours which engulfs the area & spread all over. The Emperor Jahangir had developed so much fancy & liking for this fall that he named it Noori Chamb after the name of his beloved queen Nur Jahan. Mughal queen used to stay here for relaxation. She had got fixed a mirror beside the fall on the mountain wall where she used to have her make-up after the bath. Many locals call Noori Chamb a milky waterfall, due to the white-coloured vapours formed during descending.

=== Peer Ki Gali ===
Peer ki Gali is a holy place situated between two villages, Poshana and Heer Pur, along Mughal road. Peer ki Gali is likely to be called the heart of the Mughal road. The name Peer Ki Gali has some auspicious relevance as the word 'peer' means a person devoted to religion, as per the Muslim faith. The history of this place dates back to the time of a holy and religiously elevated person named as Alamdar-e-Kashmir, Sheikh Noor-u-Din Noorani (RA) (1378 to 1441).

== Transport ==
=== Road ===
Surankote is well-connected by road to other places in Jammu and Kashmir and India by the NH 144A.

=== Rail ===
Surankote is not connected with railways. The nearest railway station is Jammu Tawi railway station located at a distance of 208 kilometres.

=== Air ===
The nearest airport is Jammu Airport located at a distance of 210 kilometres.

== See also ==
- Jammu and Kashmir
- Poonch
