= Shah Huzaib =

Freestyle football trick-shots artist from Kashmir

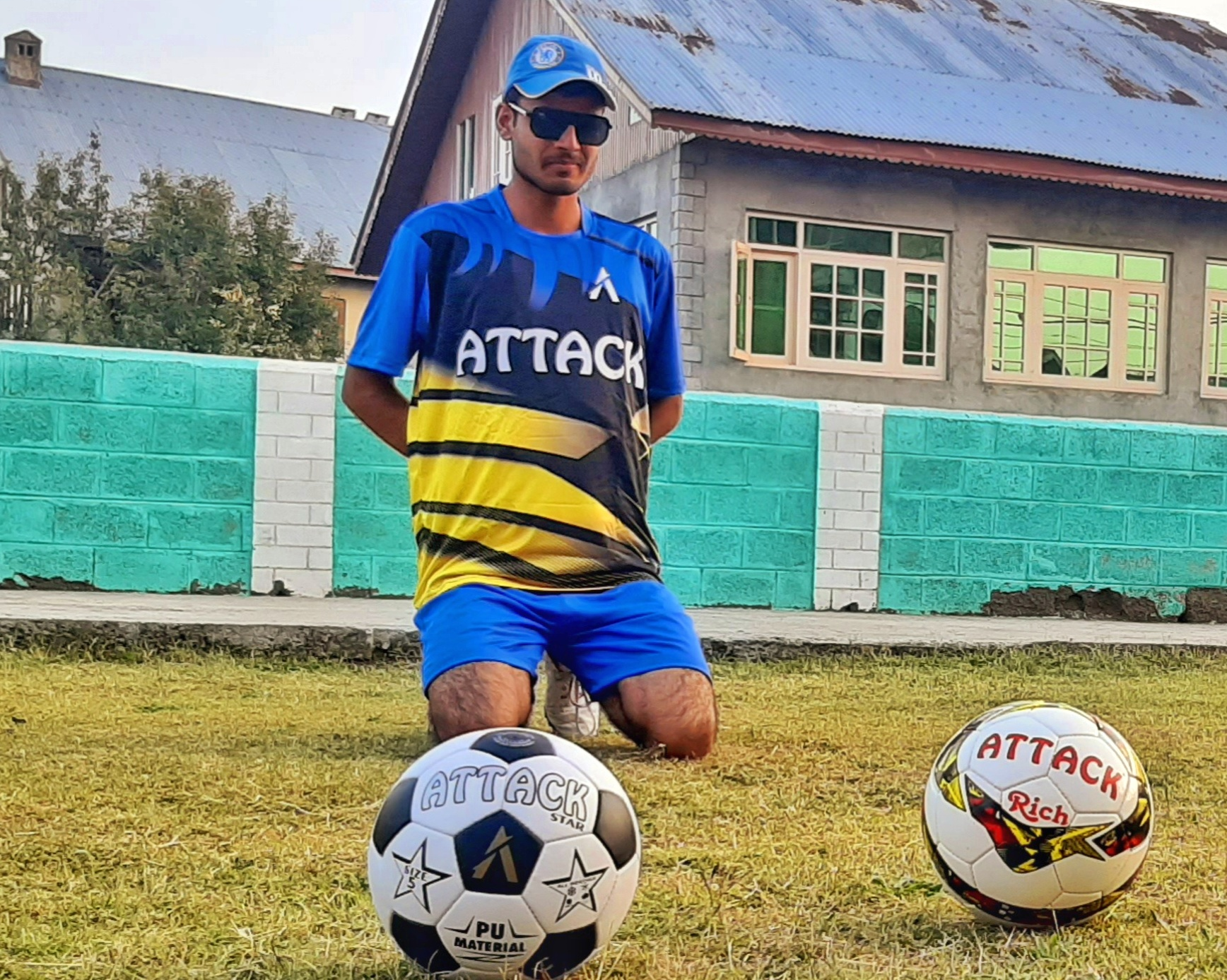
- Shah Huzaib, trick-shots artist of Kashmir
- Born: 2002 (age 23–24); Charari Sharief, Jammu and Kashmir (state), India
- Known for: football trick-shots
- Awards: Kashmiri Young Achievers' Award 2021

Shah Huzaib is a freestyle footballer from Budgam district of Jammu and Kashmir known for his trick-shots. He attracted media attention after former Indian footballer Bhaichung Bhutia, actor Sunil Shetty, and German soccer player Toni Kroos shared his videos on Instagram.

== Career ==
Huzaib was born in 2002 in Charari Sharief in the Budgam district. In 2016, he started playing football, and in May 2018, he started practising football trick-shots. In 2020, Huzaib participated in and won an international football trick-shot competition, which has been organised by Cristiano Ronaldo Fragrances.

In 2021, Huzaib attracted various news headlines when former Indian footballer Bhaichung Bhutia and Bollywood actor Sunil Shetty praised him on social media.

As of 2021, Huzaib has recorded more than 400 trick shots. He learnt trick-shots from YouTube. He looks up to footballer Cristiano Ronaldo as an inspiration.

In January 2022, German soccer player Toni Kroos also shared Huzaib's trick-shots video.

He has been invited in several television shows including India's Got Talent Season 9.
