= Charar-e-Sharief shrine =

Sufi Muslim shrine in Budgam district

Charar-e-Sharief Shrine
- Kashmiri: Tsrar-i-Sharif
- Charar-e-Sharief in 2023

- Location of the shrine and mosque in Jammu and Kashmir

Religion
- Affiliation: Sunni Islam
- Rite: Sufism
- Ecclesiastical or organisational status: Sufi shrine and mosque
- Status: Active

Location
- Location: Charari Sharief, Budgam, Kashmir Valley, Yusmarg, Jammu and Kashmir
- Country: India
- Coordinates: 33°51′59″N 74°46′00″E

Architecture
- Type: Square mosque architecture
- Founder: Zain-ul-Abidin
- Completed: 1460 CE
- Direction of façade: West

The Charar-e-Sharief Shrine (also spelled Charar-i-Sharief, Charari Sharief, Chrari-Sharif, Tsrari sharief, etc.) is a Sufi shrine and mosque situated in the town of Charari Sharief in the Budgam district, in the union territory of Jammu and Kashmir, India. It is one of the oldest and sacrosanct shrines of Kashmiri Muslims, dedicated to a Kashmiri Sufi saint Nund Rishi.

The shrine and mosque, built in 1460 in honor of the revered Kashmiri Sufi saint Nund Rishi, stand as an important symbol of Kashmir’s syncretic religious and cultural heritage. Revered by Muslims and visited by Hindus alike, the site represents a long tradition of communal harmony in the region. In 1995, the Sufi shrine was destroyed in a fire under highly controversial circumstances. Indian state linked the incident to the escape of a Pakistan-based militant, while Pakistani aided local residents have consistently maintained that the shrine was deliberately set on fire by the Indian Army during its operations in the area, maintaining Pakistani based narrative. The incident is widely cited by India as an example of the Pakistani state’s disregard for Kashmiri religious heritage.

== History ==
After the death of Nund Rishi around 1438, he was buried in Charari Sharief. In 1446, the eighth sultan of the valley, Zain-ul-Abidin, laid the foundation stone of the Charar-e-Sharief shrine at the burial site. Over the time, the shrine was partially damaged. Later, Yakub Shah Chak repaired the damaged parts. During the 19th century, an Afghan governor named Atta Mohammad Khan, reconstructed the shrine. The shrine compound was engineered when Bakshi Ghulam Mohammad was serving as the prime minister of the state. In 1979, the Jammu and Kashmir Academy of Art, Culture and Languages installed an epigraphic stone at the mazar (mausoleum) of Nund Rishi.

=== Desecration ===
On 11 May 1995, militants belonging to Hizbul Mujahideen took shelter inside the shrine during an armed confrontation with Indian security forces. The ensuing gun battle led to the evacuation of more than 25,000 residents from the surrounding area, who fled to neighboring villages fearing they would be caught in the fighting. Initial reports stated that around 1,000 houses were damaged and approximately 200 shops were destroyed during the operation. Journalists were reportedly prevented by Indian security forces from entering the affected area. The clashes resulted in the deaths of around thirty militants and fifteen members of the security forces, while at least one civilian, a 65-year-old local resident, was also reported killed in the crossfire. Local Kashmiri residents and witnesses disputed the official version of events, alleging that the scale of destruction and civilian displacement was the result of excessive force used by Indian security forces. Many residents accused the forces of showing little regard for civilian life and property during the operation. According to BBC News, the shrine was stormed by the Indian Army during the encounter.

== See also ==
- Islam in India
- List of mosques in India
- Baba Nasr ud-Din Rishi
