= Nilnag Lake =

Tourist destination in Kashmir

Nilnag Lake Blue water lake
- Rural
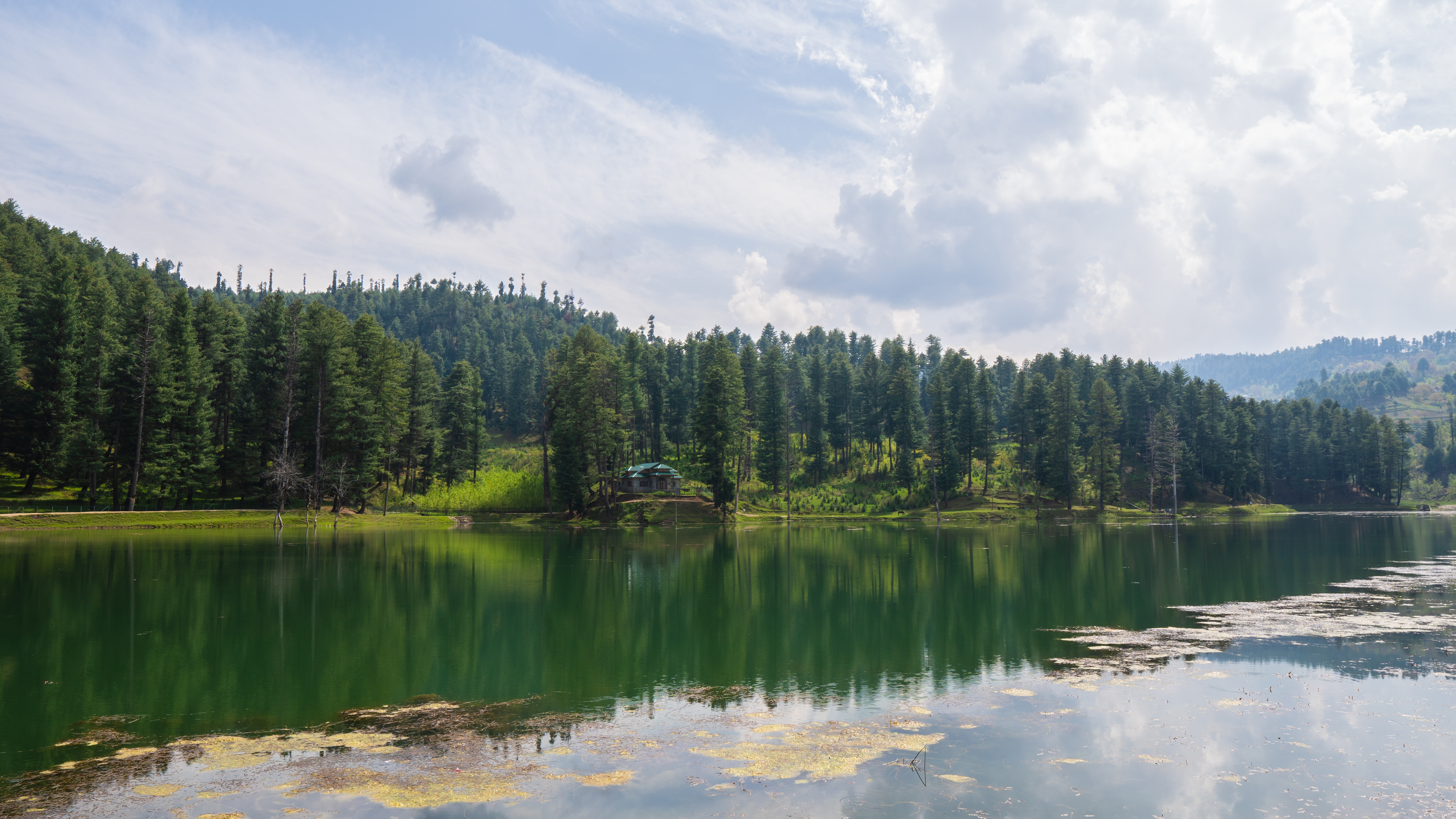
- A view of the blue waters of Nilnag Lake

- Location in Jammu & Kashmir, India Nilnag Lake (India)
- Coordinates: 33°51′20.8″N 74°41′32.55″E
- Country: India
- Union territory: Jammu and Kashmir
- District: Budgam
- Elevation: 2,390 m (7,840 ft)

Languages
  - Official: Kashmiri, Urdu, Hindi, Dogri, English
- Time zone: UTC+5:30 (IST)
- Postal code: 191112
- Vehicle registration: JK04
- Website: budgam.nic.in/places-of-interest/

Nilnag (lit. 'blue-water lake'; Urdu pronunciation: [niːlnɑːɡ]; Kashmiri pronunciation: [nilɨnaːɡ]) is a freshwater lake 35 km (22 mi) away from Budgam town in Budgam district of Jammu and Kashmir, a disputed region administered by India. It is around 47 km (29 mi) away from Srinagar, the summer capital of the union territory. The lake is famous for its turquoise water. The route from Yousmarg is rather difficult and unmotorable and goes through a dense forest. The lake's crystal-clear blue water gave it its name: nag stands for lake (or a spring) and nil for the blue colour. The location is a great for picnic spot.

== History ==
The lake was Eric Biscoe's favourite destination. Biscoe (died in 1949), who was the founder of Tyndal Biscoe school in Jammu and Kashmir, wanted to be buried by the lake side. To honour his wishes, his ashes were brought and buried there. Hugh Tyndale-Biscoe in his book states:

“In his introduction Parwez said that I was bringing back to Kashmir the mortal remains of Mr Eric to be cast into Nil Nag…. Some days later a party of students and staff accompanied us to Buzgu village, where I explained to the villagers Eric's wish and sought their approval. They gave approval and accompanied us to the lake where I paddled out on a couple of logs and shook the ashes into the waters of the lake.”

— Hugh Tyndale-Biscoe, The Missionary and the Maharajas: Cecil Tyndale-Biscoe and the Making of Modern Kashmir, p.308

== Access ==
Nilnag is easily accessible from Srinagar or Srinagar Airport (SXR), in under 2–3 hours from car or bus. The routes of Nilnag are from Srinagar to Chadoora, and then to Buzgu via Nagam. The total distance is about 47 km (29 mi).

=== By road ===
Nilnag can be reached in from under 2 hours by car or taxi from Srinagar. The roads have recently been reconstructed, however, at certain places, the roads may be uneven. Another route is from Yousmarg to Nilnag, however, it is only pliable by motorbikes.

=== By air ===
The nearest airport is the Sheikh-ul-Alam International Airport (Srinagar, Jammu and Kashmir). Nilnag is at a distance of 41 km (25 mi) from the airport, and it takes about 2 hours by car.

== Recent developments ==
The lake basin is actively going through shallowing owing to siltation, an indicator of which is the emergent vegetation cover "in the lake littorals". In 2017, Yousmarg Development Authority (YDA) undertook dredging of the lake basin. The boundaries were also widened, and huts were built for monitoring.
