= Sunset Peak (Jammu and Kashmir) =

Mountain in Jammu and Kashmir, India

- Location within Jammu and Kashmir Location within India

Highest point
- Elevation: 4,745 m (15,568 ft)
- Prominence: 1,942 m (6,371 ft)
- Listing: Ultra
- Coordinates: 33°40′48″N 74°32′27″E

Geography
- Location: Poonch and Ramban districts, Jammu and Kashmir, India
- Parent range: Pirpanjal Range, Himalayas

Climbing
- First ascent: 1901 by Dr Arthur Neve, Dr Ernest Neve (Brothers), United Kingdom
- Easiest route: North Ridge: glacier/snow/ice climb

Sunset Peak, also known as Romesh Thong, is a mountain massif on the border of Shopian and Poonch, with a peak elevation of 4,745 metres (15,568 ft). It is the highest peak of this massif, the other peak being Tatakooti Peak at 4,725 m (15,502 ft). Sunset Peak, as the name suggests, lies to the west of the Kashmir Valley. It is located 40 km west of Shopian town and 105 km southwest of Srinagar, the summer capital of Jammu and Kashmir.

== Mountaineering ==
Early exploration of the Pirpanjal Range was carried by Thomas Montgomerie and Godwin Austen in 1856. The first ascent of the summit was made in 1901 by Arthur Neve and Ernest Neve, the British brothers who took the route via Yusmarg Konsar Nag and climbed the summit through north face.

The massif is accessed by 105 km (65 mi) by road from Srinagar. The Mughal Road passes through the base of this mountain which lies on the right side of the road.

== See also ==
- List of ultras of the Himalayas
