= Bufliaz =

Buffliaz Bafliaz
- Village
- Location in Jammu & Kashmir, India Buffliaz (India)
- Coordinates: 33.6109°N 74.3565°E
- Country: India
- Union territory: Jammu & Kashmir
- Division: Jammu
- District: Poonch
- Tehsil: Surankote

Languages
  - Spoken: Kashmiri, Pahari
  - Official: Urdu, English
- Time zone: UTC+5:30 (IST)
- PIN Code: 185121
- Vehicle registration: JK-12
- Website: poonch.gov.in

Bufliaz, or Bafliaz, is a village and the headquarters of the eponymous community development block in Surankote tehsil of Poonch district in the Jammu division of Jammu and Kashmir, India in the disputed Kashmir region. It lies on the Poonch–Rajouri road and is also the starting point of the Mughal Road that leads into the Kashmir Valley through Shopian.

According to local legend, Bufliaz was the place where Bucephalus, the favourite horse of Macedonian king Alexander was killed in battle with the son of Porus. They claim Bafilyaz is the corrupted form of Buccaphalus.

== Mughal Road ==
Bufliaz connects Kashmir Valley via Mughal Road which is 83.9 km long from district Shopian. In the winter, heavy snowfall blocks the 83.9 km long road due to non-availability of the facilities provided by the state government and Public Works Department - Jammu & Kashmir.

== Community Development Block ==
According to 2011 census report, there are 22 Panchayat Halqas and 158 Wards in Bufliaz block. It has a total population of 6,294 people.
