= Mughal Road =

Road in Jammu and Kashmir, India

- Map of Mughal Road in red
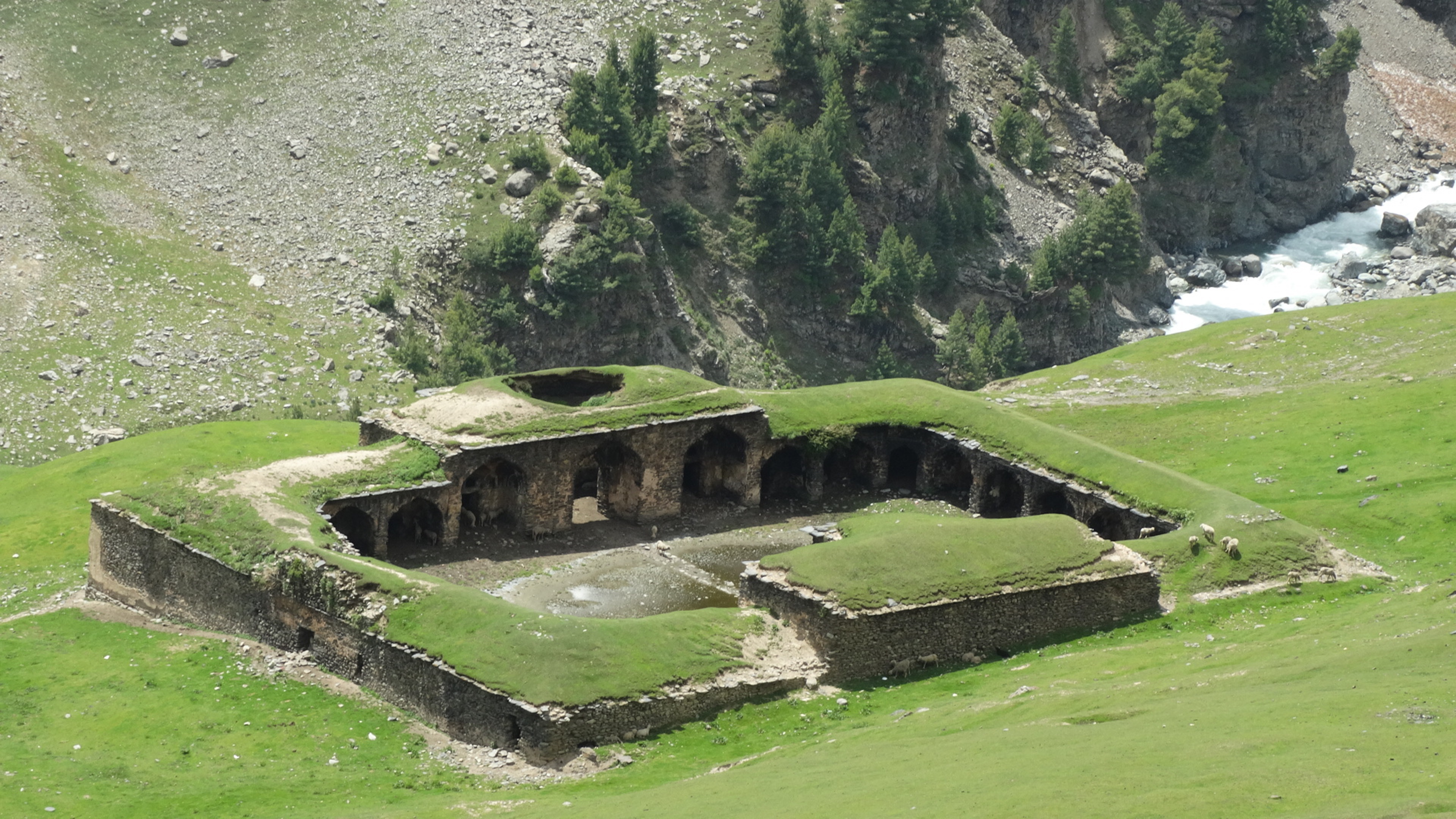
- Aliabad Sarai, a halting point on old Mughal road

Route information
- Length: 80 km (50 mi)

Major junctions
- East end: Shopian, Shopian district
- West end: Bufliaz, Poonch district

Location
- Country: India
- States: Jammu and Kashmir

Highway system
- Roads in India; Expressways; National; State; Asian

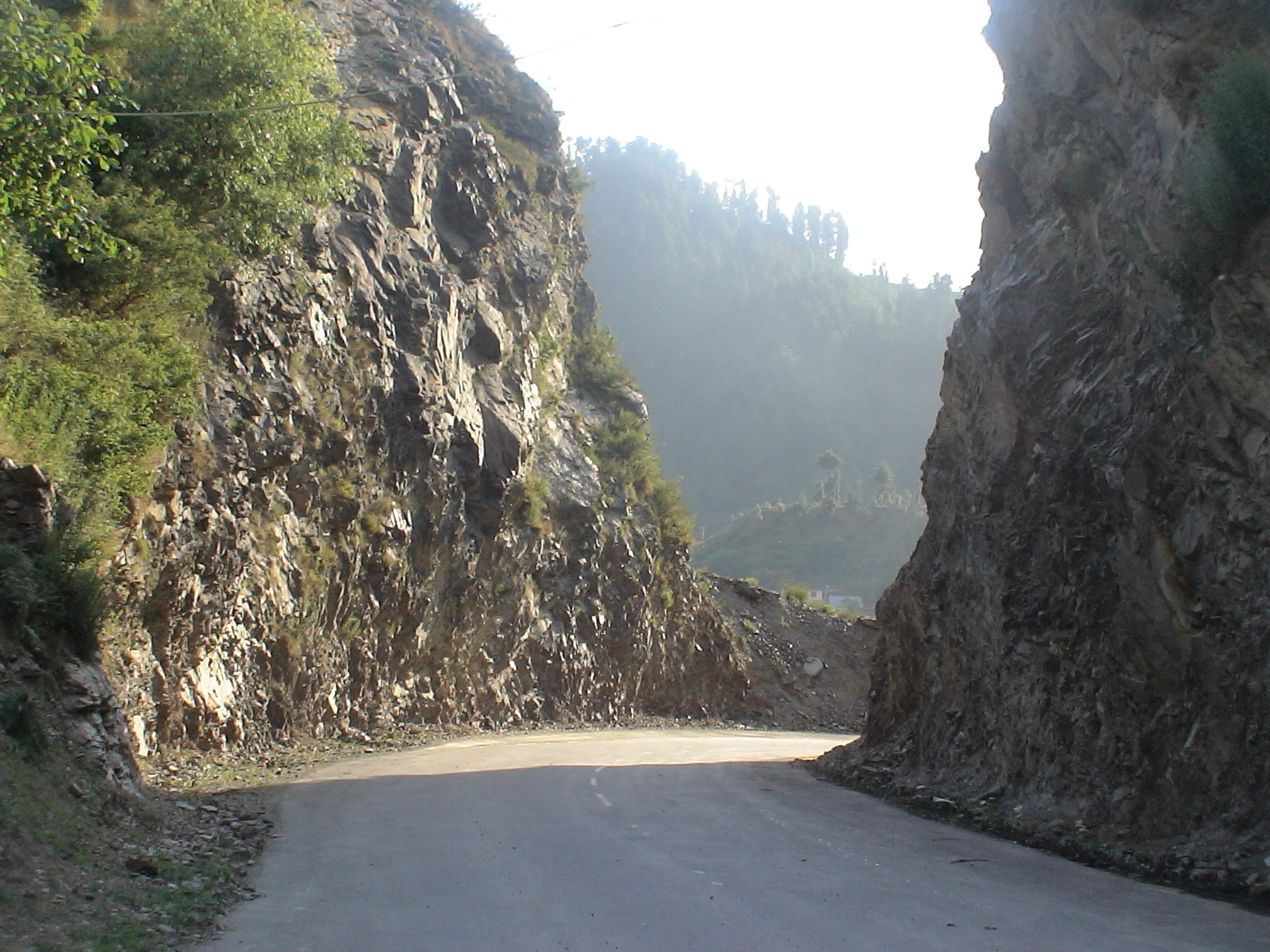
The Mughal Road crosses the Pir Panjal Pass.

Mughal Road is the road between Bufliaz, a town in the Poonch district, to the Shopian district, in the union territory of Jammu and Kashmir, India. The 84-kilometre road traces a historic route used in the Mughal period over the Pir Panjal Pass, at an altitude of 3,500 m (11,500 ft), higher than the Banihal pass at 2,832 m (9,291 ft).

The road connects Poonch and Rajouri to Srinagar in the Kashmir valley, and reduces the distance between Shopian and Poonch from 588 km to 126 km. It also provides an alternative route into the Kashmir valley off the Jammu–Srinagar highway. The road passes through Buffliaz, Behramgalla, Chandimarh, Dogray (Dogran), Godawan, Poshana, Chattapani, Peer Ki Gali, Aliabad, Zaznar, Dubjian, Hirpora, and Shopian.

== History ==
=== Sultanate period ===
A route linking Hirapur (modern Hirpora) in the Kashmir Valley with Poonch via the Pir Panjal Pass (Peer Ki Gali) has been used from ancient times. During the period of the sultans, it was extended to Bhimber. Historian Mohibbul Hasan says it played an important role during this period.

=== Mughal period ===
After conquering the Kashmir Valley, the emperor Akbar strengthened the route into an 'Imperial Road' stretching from Lahore to Kashmir. In modern times, the route has been referred to as the 'Mughal Road'.

=== 1950-2012 upgrades ===
The new road was proposed in the 1950s to improve the economy of the Kashmir valley. The then chief minister Sheikh Abdullah took up this project in 1979 and named it the 'Mughal Road', but it came to a halt as terrorism took over. Bafliaz Bridge on the road was blown up by the terrorists.

Actual construction began in October 2005 with a target of completion in March 2007 and an estimated cost of 255 crore rupees. A conservation trust petitioned the Supreme Court to stop construction, citing the disturbance to animals in the Hirpora Wildlife Sanctuary, especially the endangered Markhor goat; and claiming the road would get early snowfall in winter and hence would not serve as an alternate route to the existing Jammu-Srinagar highway. However, the court gave conditional permission for the construction of the road.

The construction due to be completed in December 2008, was delayed for a number of reasons, including the Amar Nath land row. The road was opened on 12 July 2009 for inspection by state legislators, officials, engineers, and others. It was supposed to be thrown open for light vehicles in October 2010 but the law-and-order situation in Kashmir in 2010 imposed delays. A double-lane road was completed and opened for light vehicles in August 2012.

=== Tourism ===
A Mughal Road Car Rally has been held annually since 2010. It covers 600 km, including the picturesque stretch across Pir Panjal.

=== Present status: Road upgrade and Pir Ki Gali Tunnel ===
- 2025 Jun: After Indian government approved the upgrade of the entire Mughal road to the national highway standard at the cost of approximately Rs 1200 cr and construction of tunnel under the Pir Panjal Pass (Pir Ki Gali) at the cost of Rs 3,830 cr by the NHIDCL to make the entire route all-weather, Spain’s Getinsa-Euroestudios and India's Rodic Consultants Pvt Ltd prepared the DPR for widening of the Mughal Road and Samit Pvt Ltd prepared the DPR for Pir Panjal Pass Tunnel (Pir Ki Gali Tunnel). After NHIDCL delegated the construction to Border Roads Organisation (BRO), the preliminary work is underway. India's Highway Minister, Nitin Gadkari, wants to expedite construction of Mughal road tunnel for better connectivity from Shopian to Poonch.

== See also ==
- India–China Border Roads (ICBRs)
- Kashmir Railway
