= Pir Panjal Pass =

Mountain pass in Jammu & Kashmir, India

- Peer Ki Gali
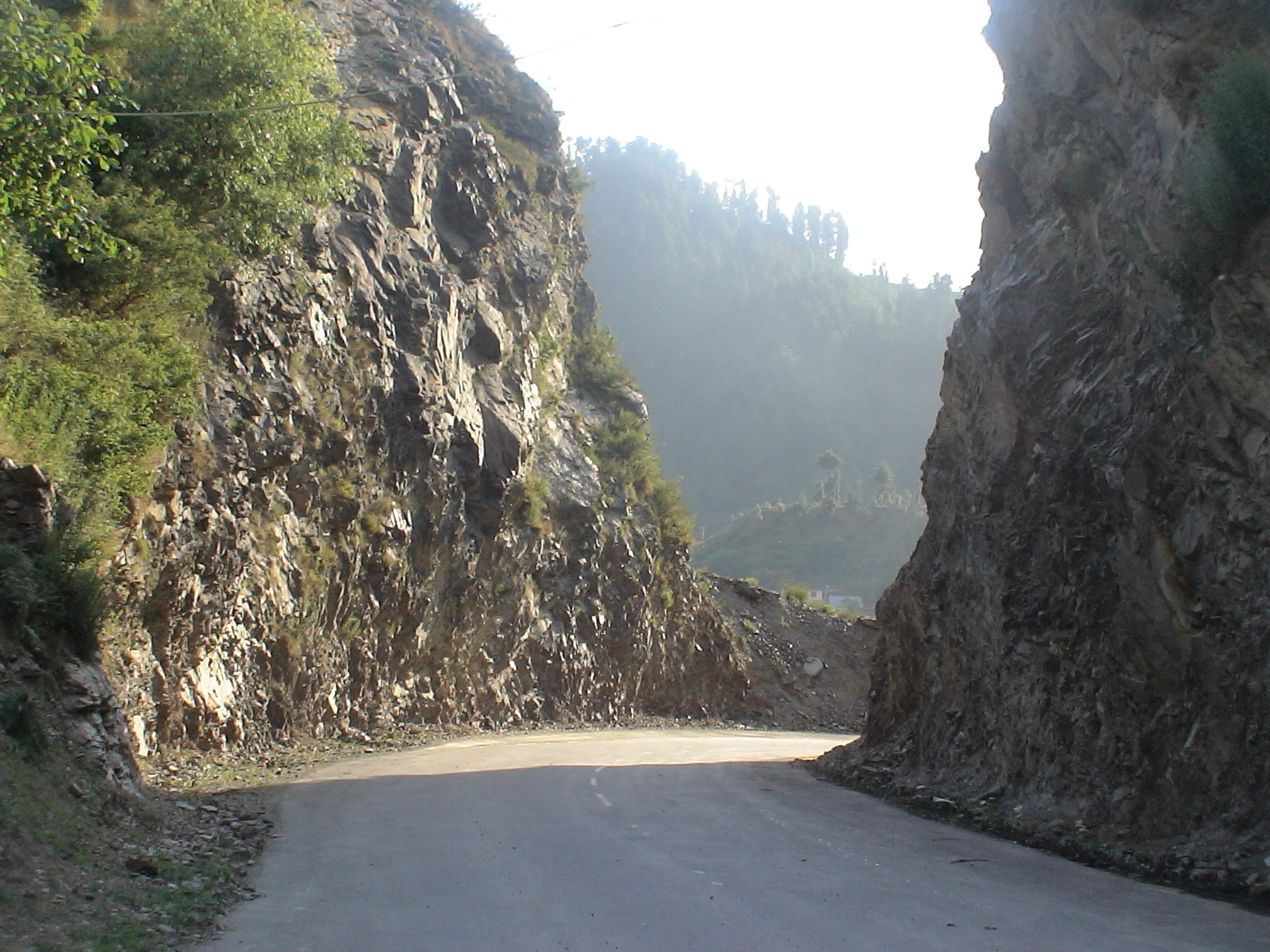
- Pir Panjal Pass

- Location within Jammu and Kashmir
- Elevation: 3,485 m (11,434 ft)
- Traversed by: Mughal Road

Third Approach
- Location: Jammu & Kashmir, India
- Range: Pir Panjal Range
- Coordinates: 33.629931°N 74.519968°E

The Pir Panjal Pass, also called Peer Ki Gali (or Peer Gali), is a mountain pass and a tourist destination located in the Pir Panjal Range in Jammu and Kashmir, India. It connects the Kashmir Valley to the Poonch district of Jammu & Kashmir via the Mughal Road. It is the highest point on the Mughal road at 3,490 m (11,450 ft) and lies to the southwest of the Kashmir valley.

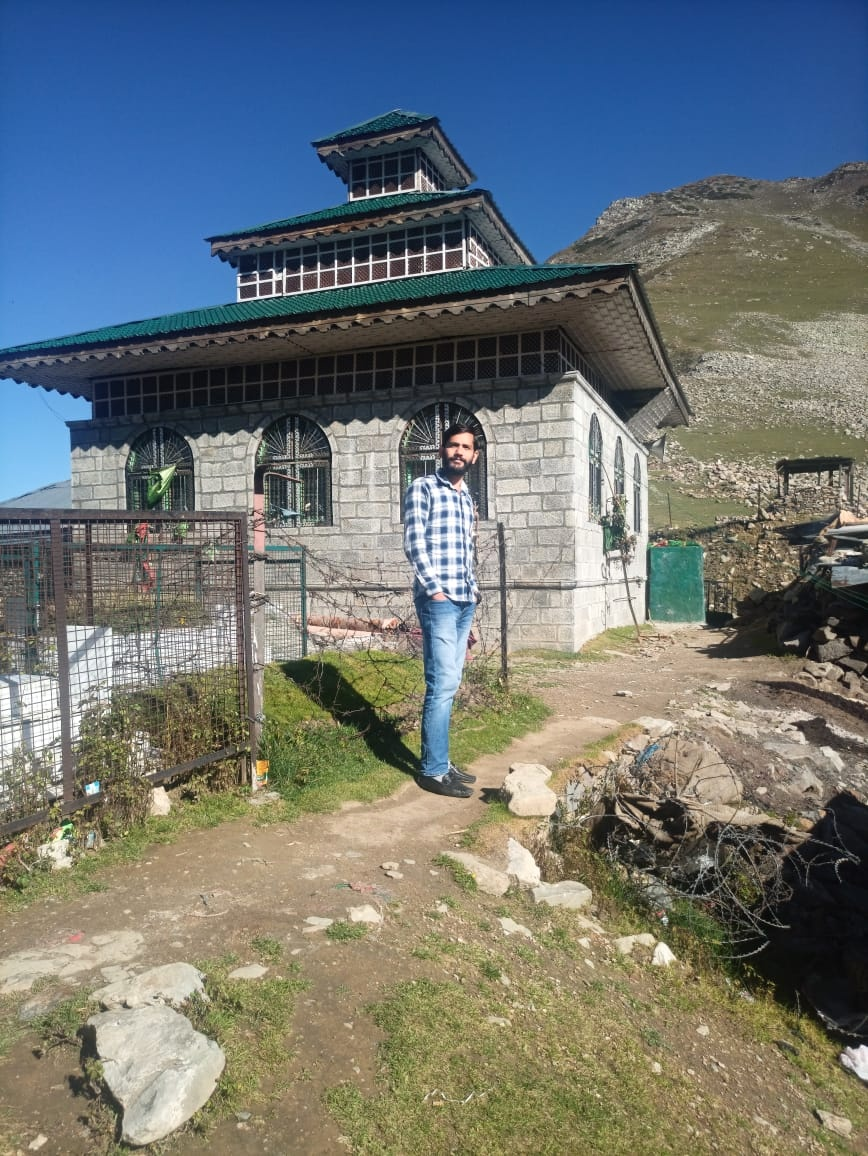
Shrine of Shaikh Ahmed Karim RA

== Name ==
The Pir Panjal Pass appears in Srivara's Rajatarangini as Panchaladeva (IAST: Pāñcāladeva), meaning the deity of Panchala. Panchala is a kingdom mentioned in the Mahabharata in the northwest Uttar Pradesh. Other traditions place the Mahabharata regions in western Punjab and southern Kashmir. Scholar Dineshchandra Sircar has analysed the geography described in the Shakti‐sangama Tantra, where this is indeed the case.

Scholar M. A. Stein states that the high mountain passes were always regarded as deities or were associated with deities. These customs continued after the region was Islamised by substituting the concept of Pir, Muslim saint, for deity.

The Pir Panjal Pass name is tied to the entire mountain range (Pir Panjal Range). In recent times, the term "Panjal" has become restricted to the mountain range, and the pass came to be called simply Peer Ki Gali (the Pir's pass). It is associated with the saint Mir Sayyid Ali Hamadani as well as another saint Sheikh Ahmed Karim.

== Description ==
Pir Panjal Pass

The Pir Panjal Pass can be taken to run between its western entrance, which goes by the name Peer Ki Gali, and a historical way station called Aliabad Sarai (elevation: 3115 metres) at its eastern end. A stream referred to as Pir Panjal stream runs through the valley, flowing east, which becomes the Rambi Ara River in the Shopian district. Scholar Mohibbul Hassan states that the old route through the pass kept to the southern side of the stream, but the Moghuls switched it to the northern side because a steep cliff called Hastivanj to the south was difficult to cross. The modern "Mughal Road" constructed between 2005 and 2009 is close to the route used by the Mughals, though it is not identical to it.

To the west of Peer Ki Gali, cliffs descend steeply into a valley, which carries another mountain stream that joins the Poonch River flowing from the north. A hill village called Bahramgala (original name: Bhairavgala) marks the end of the valley. The Sikh sources name the pass itself as "Bahramgala pass".

The modern Mughal Road avoids the steep descent by following the hill sides to the north. It ends at a town called Bufliaz about 10 km to the west of Bahramgala. From there the National Highway 144A connects to Poonch to the northwest and Rajouri to the south.

At Peer Ki Gali, the night temperatures often drop below -15°C in winters. It is the highest point on Mughal Road. Peer Ki Gali is 40 km away from Shopian, 80 km from Poonch.

== History ==
Historian Mohibbul Hasan states that the Pir Panjal Pass was one of the main passes into the Kashmir Valley and exercised a great influence on its history. A route linking Hirapur (modern Hirpora) in the Kashmir Valley with Rajauri via the pass is known to have been used from ancient times. During the period of the sultans it seems to have been extended up to Bhimber.

After conquering the Kashmir Valley, the emperor Akbar strengthened the route into an 'Imperial Road' stretching from Lahore to Kashmir. In modern times, the route has been referred to as the 'Mughal Road'.

The Sikh emperor, Maharaja Ranjit Singh, launched an invasion of the Durrani-controlled Kashmir Valley in 1814, partly via the Pir Panjal Pass. He divided the forces into two parts, one attacking via the Pir Panjal Pass under the command of Dewan Ram Dayal and the other led by himself via the Tosa Maidan. Ram Dayal forced through the Pir Panjal pass, reached Baramulla and fortified himself. Ranjit Singh could not break through the Durrani defences at Tosa Madian, and was forced to retreat. In a second invasion in 1819, all the forces were sent via the Tosa Maidan, and conquered the Durrani forces.

=== Aliabad Sarai ===
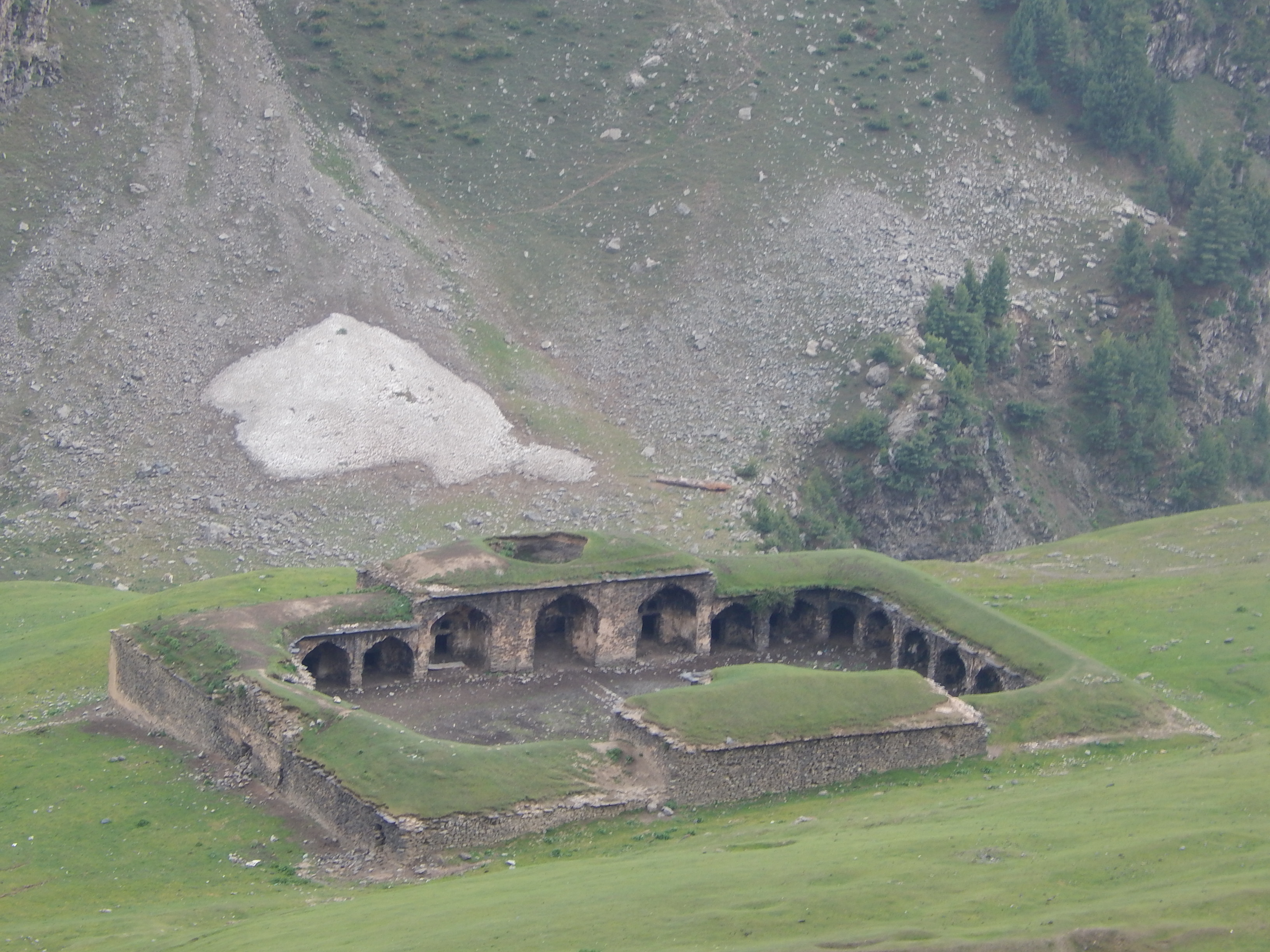
Aliabad Sarai way station seen from behind from the current Mughal Road

The Aliabad Sarai is a rest house in the Pir Panjal Pass, said to have been constructed by the Emperor Jahangir towards the end of the 16th century. It was one of the 14 halting stations constructed between Lahore and Srinagar along the Moghal Road. An Iranian engineer called Ali Mardan Khan was in charge of the construction, aided by the local chieftains. The safe keeping of the heritage building has been neglected by the government, and it has been used in recent times by local shepherds as a shed for cattle.

The original Moghal Road passed in front of the Aliabad Sarai rest house. The current one runs behind it, at a higher elevation.

=== Pirs ===
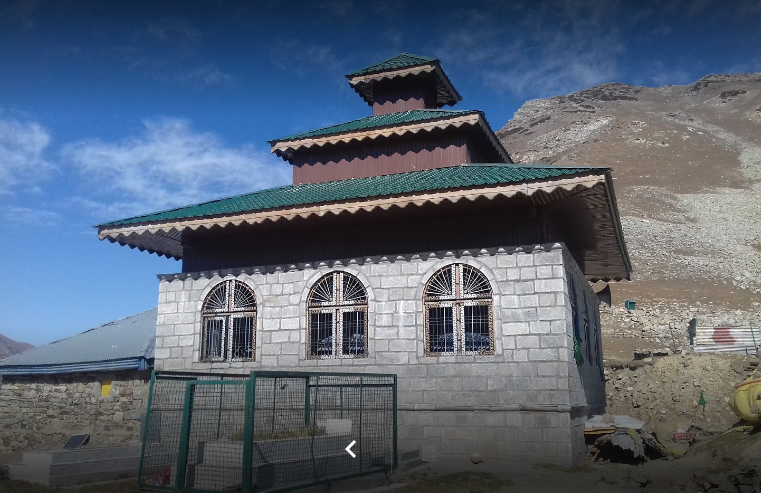
Shrine representing Sheikh Ahmed Karim's meditating place

The local tradition associates Saint Mir Sayyid Ali Hamadani with the Peer Ki Gali. Written records note a Pir called Sheikh Ahmed Karim lived and meditated in the Peer Ki Gali during the time of emperor Jahangir. He converted to Islam from Hinduism, regarded the Peer Ki Gali as a place of God and insisted all the passersby treat it with reverence. The records also state that emperor Jahangir disregarded his commandments, but Shahjahan and Aurangzeb followed them.

A shrine stands in the Peer Ki Gali to mark the Pir's meditating place, inside which some believe is a stone with his hand print.

== Tunnel ==
Pir Panjal Pass Tunnel (Pir Ki Gali Tunnel) has been approved, and undergoing planning phase.

== See also ==
- Tunnels in North West India

== Bibliography ==
- Gupta, Hari Ram (1991), History of the Sikhs: The Sikh lion of Lahore, Maharaja Ranjit Singh, 1799-1839, Munshiram Manoharlal
- Hasan, Mohibbul (1959), Kashmir under the Sultans, Aakar Books, pp. 43–, ISBN 978-81-87879-49-7
- Stein, M. A. (1900), Kalhana's Rajatarangini: A chronicle of the kings of Kasmir, Volume 2, Westminster: Archibald Constable and Co., ISBN 978-81-208-0370-1
