= Surankote Tehsil =

Surankote
- Tehsil
- Location in Jammu and Kashmir, India Surankote (India)
- Coordinates: 33.639°N 74.254°E
- Country: India
- Union Territory: Jammu and Kashmir
- District: Poonch
- Headquarters: Surankote

Government
  - Type: Tehsil
  - Body: Tehsildar

Population (2011)
  - Total: 124,755

Languages
  - Official: Dogri, English, Hindi, Kashmiri, Urdu
  - Spoken: Gojri, Pahari
- Time zone: UTC+5:30 (IST)
- PIN: 185121
- Vehicle registration: JK-12
- Major highways: NH 144A
- Website: poonch.nic.in

Surankote Tehsil is a tehsil of the Poonch district in the Indian union territory of Jammu and Kashmir in the disputed Kashmir region. It is headquartered at the Surankote.

== Administration ==
The Surankote tehsil is headquartered at Surankote.

== Demographics ==
Religion in Surankote Tehsil (2011)
1. Islam (96.7%)
2. Hinduism (2.56%)
3. Sikhism (0.49%)
4. Christianity (0.16%)
5. Not Stated (0.07%)

The total projected population of Surankote Tehsil is 124,755, with 65,699 males and 59,056 females according to the 2011 census of India. The population includes Paharis, Gujjars, Bakerwals and Kashmiris.

== Transport ==
=== Air ===
Poonch Airport is a non-operational airstrip in the district headquarters Poonch located 30 kilometres from Surankote. The nearest airport to Surankote is Sheikh ul-Alam International Airport in Srinagar, located 150 kilometres from Surankote.

=== Rail ===
There is no railway connectivity to Surankote. There are plans to construct the Jammu–Poonch line which will connect Jammu with the district headquarters Poonch with railways. The nearest major railway station is Jammu Tawi railway station located 210 kilometres from Surankote.

=== Road ===
The tehsil is well-connected to other places in Jammu and Kashmir and India by the NH 144A and other intra-district roads.

Poonch district tehsils

== See also ==
- Poonch
- Jammu and Kashmir
- Rajouri
- Surankote
- Jammu
