= Charari Sharief =

Town in Jammu and Kashmir, India

Charari Sharief Tsrar-i-Sharif
- Town
- Nickname: Tsrar
- Location in Jammu and Kashmir, India Charari Sharief (India)
- Coordinates: 33.862°N 74.766°E
- Country: India
- Union territory: Jammu & Kashmir
- District: Budgam
- Elevation: 1,933 m (6,342 ft)

Population (2011)
  - Total: 11,533

Languages
  - Official: Kashmiri, Urdu, Hindi, Dogri, English
- Time zone: UTC+5:30 (IST)
- Postal code: 191112
- Vehicle registration: JK04

Charari Sharief (also spelled Charar-i-Sharief; Urdu pronunciation: [t͡ʃəɾɑːre ʃəɾiːf], known as Tsrar-i-Sharif (Kashmiri pronunciation: [t͡sraːri ʃəriːf] or [t͡saːri ʃəriːf]) in Kashmiri is a town and a notified area committee in the Budgam district of Jammu and Kashmir, India.

The Assembly constituency is one of the 90 constituencies in Jammu and Kashmir. The town was given the status of a block in January 2014. The town is divided into 10 wards. Each ward has a municipal councillor. The town's mohallas are: Talab-e-Kalan or Bada Talab, Trajibal, Court Road, Gulshan Abad, Nowhar, Baghi Noor U Din Nowhar, Jabl-e-Noor, Wazabagh, Alamdar colony, Zaloosa, and Kumar Mohalla.

== Geography ==
Charari Sharief has an average elevation of 1,933 metres (6,342 ft) above mean sea level.

== Demographics ==
As of the 2011 India census, the town had a total of 2098 households. Charari Sharief has an average literacy rate of 59%, slightly lower than the national average of 59.5%, with male literacy of 58% and female literacy of 38%.

Demographics (2011 Census)
	Total	Male	Female
Population	11,533	5,904	5,629
Children	1,638	880	758
Workers (all)	2,826	2,574	254
Non working	8,707	3,332	5,375
Literacy	6497	3783	2714

== Municipal committee ==
Municipal Committee Charari Sharief (MCC) is an Urban Local Body which administers the town of Charari Sharief in Budgam district, Jammu and Kashmir, India. It has 13 elected members. Its last elections took place on 10 October 2018.

Keys: INC (11) Vacant (2)

#	Name	Municipal Ward	Reservation Status	Party
1	Maheen Munir	Karim Abad	Women Open	INC
2	Zahid Jan Baba	Sheer Abad	Open	INC
3	Vacant	Shah Abad	Open	N/A
4	Vacant	Reshi Abad	Women Open	INC
5	Imtiyaz Ahmad Dar	Wazabagh	Open	INC
6	Vacant	Noor Abad	Open	INC
7	Vacant	Sharief Abad	Women Open	INC
8	Hamid Hussain	Gulshan Abad A	Open	INC
9	Anjil Zahid	Gulshan Abad B	Open	INC
10	Jawhara	Nudreshi Colony	Women Open	INC
11	Vacant	Almadar Basti 1	Open	N/A
12	Bilal Ahmad Teli	Almadar Basti 2	Open	INC
13	Tariq Ahmad Dar	Rozabal	Open	INC

== Tsrar Kanger ==
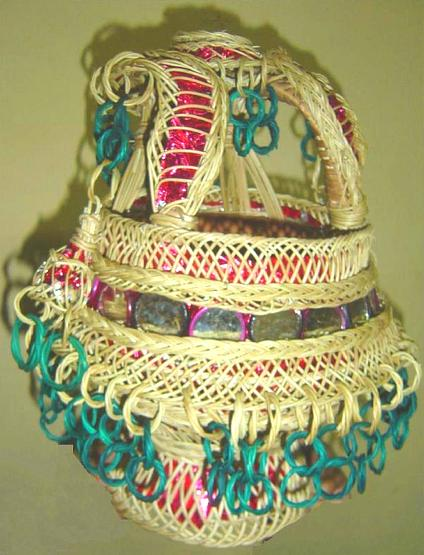
A fancy Kanger is usually used for decorative purposes

Tsrar-i-Sharief is most famous for its variety of kangri known as "Tsrar kanger". Writing in 1895, Sir Walter Lawrence, in his passage about Kanger in The Valley of Kashmir, exclaims: “Among the most prized of the Tsrari Sharif fairings is the pretty painted Kanger.” Tsrar Kanger is specifically used to inaugurate wedding ceremonies. During this ritual, aromatic seeds called 'isband' are burned because the practice is believed to ward off evil spirits.

== See also ==
- Charar-e-Sharief Shrine
- Charari Sharief Assembly constituency
- Yusmarg
- Kanger
- Nasr ud-Din Rishi
