= Tatakooti =

Mountain in Jammu and Kashmir, India

Tratte koot Peak
- Tatakuti
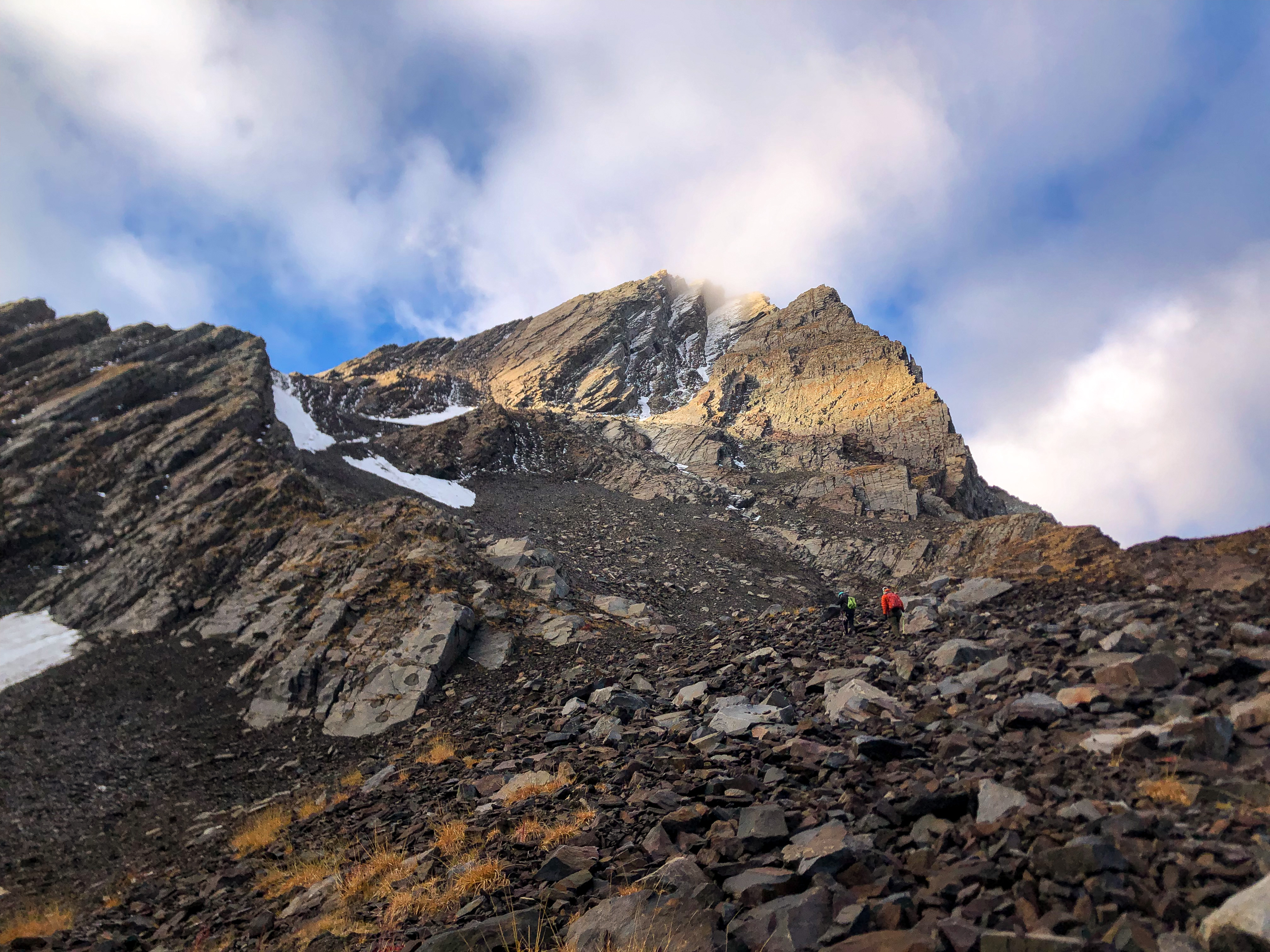
- Northern face of the Tatakooti peak

Highest point
- Elevation: 4,760 m (15,620 ft)
- Coordinates: 33°42′15.4″N 74°31′0.24″E

Geography
- Location within Jammu and Kashmir Location within India
- Location: Budgam-Poonch district, Jammu and Kashmir, India
- Parent range: Pirpanjal Range, Himalayas
- Borders on: Budgam & Poonch

Climbing
- First ascent: 1901 by C.E. Barton, Dr Ernest Neve
- Easiest route: SE arete : glacier/rock climb

Tratte Koot or Tatakooti or Tatakuti, Peak is a mountain with a peak elevation of 4,760 metres (15,620 ft), on the border of Budgam and Poonch districts of Jammu and Kashmir, India. Ernest Neve described it as "the most conspicuous and imposing peak of Pir Panjal range". The other higher peak of this range is Sunset Peak at 4,750 m (15,580 feet). Tatakooti, along with Sunset Peak, lies southwest of the Kashmir Valley. It is located 40 km west of Shopian town and 30 km from Chadoora Budgam and 105 km southwest of Srinagar, the summer capital of Jammu and Kashmir. It is the highest peak of the Pir Panjal bounding Kashmir from SW.

== History ==
Early exploration of the Pirpanjal Range was carried by Thomas Montgomerie and Godwin Austen in 1856. The first ascent of Tatakooti peak was made in 1901 by C. E. Barton and Dr Ernest Neve. ..
