= Jammu and Kashmir Pradesh Congress Committee =

Jammu & Kashmir Pradesh Congress Committee
- Abbreviation: JKPCC
- President: Tariq Hameed Karra
- Chairman: Ghulam Ahmad Mir
- Headquarters: Shaheedi Chowk, Jammu-180001, Jammu and Kashmir
- Youth wing: Jammu kashmir Youth Congress
- Women's wing: Jammu kashmir Pradesh Mahila Congress Committee
- Ideology: Populism; Social liberalism; Democratic socialism; Social democracy; Secularism
- ECI Status: An Union Territorial Unit of Indian National Congress
- Alliance: Indian National Developmental Inclusive Alliance
- Seats in Rajya Sabha: 0 / 4
- Seats in Lok Sabha: 0 / 5
- Seats in Jammu and Kashmir Legislative Assembly: 6 / 90
- Seats in District Development Council: 26 / 280

Election symbol

The Jammu and Kashmir Pradesh Congress Committee (JKPCC) is a state unit of the Indian National Congress (INC) in the union territory of Jammu and Kashmir. It is responsible for organizing and coordinating the party's activities and campaigns within the region, as well as selecting candidates for local, state, and national elections in the union territory of Jammu and Kashmir. The JKPCC is currently headed by Tariq Hameed Karra.

== Structure and composition ==
S.No.	Name	Designation	Incharge
01	Tariq Hameed Karra	President	Jammu Kashmir Pradesh Congress
02	Raman Bhalla	Working President	Jammu Kashmir Pradesh Congress
03	Tara Chand	Working President	Jammu Kashmir Pradesh Congress
04	M. K. Bhardwaj	Interim-Working President	Jammu Kashmir Pradesh Congress
05	Bhanu Mahajan	Interim-Working President	Jammu Kashmir Pradesh Congress
06	Iftkhar Ahmed	General Sectetary	Jammu Kashmir Pradesh Congress
07	Ravinder Sharma	Chief Spokesperson	Jammu Kashmir Pradesh Congress

== List of presidents ==
S.no	President	Portrait	Term	
1.	Mohammad Shafi Qureshi		2000	2002
2.	Ghulam Nabi Azad		2002	2004
3.	Peerzada Mohammad Syed		2004	2008
4.	Saifuddin Soz		2008	2015
5.	Ghulam Ahmad Mir		2015	16 August 2022
6.	Vikar Rasool Wani		16 August 2022	16 August 2024
7.	Tariq Hameed Karra		16 August 2024	Incumbent

== Jammu and Kashmir Legislative Assembly election ==
Year	Party leader	Seats won	Change in seats	Outcome
1951	___	0 / 75	New	Didn't Contest
1957	___	0 / 75	__	Didn't Contest
1962	__	0 / 75	__	Didn't Contest
1967	Ghulam Mohammed Sadiq	61 / 75	▲61	Government
1972	Syed Mir Qasim	58 / 75	▼3	Government
1977	Bhim Singh	11 / 76	▼46	Opposition
1983	Iftikhar Hussain Ansari	26 / 75	▲15	Opposition
1987	Om Parkash	26 / 76	__	Government NC+INC
1996	Mehbooba Mufti	7 / 87	▼19	Opposition
2002	Ghulam Nabi Azad	20 / 87	▲13	Government PDP+INC
2008	Ghulam Nabi Azad	17 / 87	▼3	Government NC+INC
2014	Ghulam Nabi Azad	12 / 87	▼5	Opposition
2024	Tariq Hameed Karra	6 / 90	▼6	Outside support to NC government

== Performance in Jammu and Kashmir Lok Sabha Elections ==
Lok Sabha Elections
Year	Lok Sabha	Party Leader	Seats contested	Seats won	(+/−) in seats	% of votes	Vote swing	Popular vote	Outcome
1967	4th	Indira Gandhi	6	5 / 6 (83%)	5	50.52	New entry	4,25,668	Government
1971	5th	Indira Gandhi	6	5 / 6 (83%)	Steady	54.06	▲3.54	6,30,690	Government
1977	6th	Indira Gandhi	3	3 / 6 (50%)	▼2	16.37	▼37.69	2,33,144	Opposition
1980	7th	Indira Gandhi	1	1 / 6 (17%)	▼2	18.68	▲2.31	2,49,760	Government
1984	8th	Rajiv Gandhi	4	3 / 6 (50%)	▲2	30.23	▲11.55	6,61,435	Government
1989	9th	Rajiv Gandhi	3	2 / 6 (33%)	▼1	38.95	▲8.72	4,07,474	Opposition
1991	10th	P. V. Narasimha Rao	Elections Not Held						Government
1996	11th	P. V. Narasimha Rao	6	4 / 6 (67%)	▲2	27.46	▼11.49	5,69,942	Opposition
1998	12th	Sitaram Kesri	6	1 / 6 (17%)	▼3	19.24	▼8.22	4,15,354	Opposition
1999	13th	Sonia Gandhi	5	0 / 6 (0%)	▼1	17.83	▼1.41	2,80,065	Opposition
2004	14th	Sonia Gandhi	3	2 / 6 (33%)	▲2	27.83	▲10.00	6,23,182	Government
2009	15th	Manmohan Singh	3	2 / 6 (33%)	Steady	24.67	▼3.16	6,43,175	Government
2014	16th	Rahul Gandhi	3	0 / 6 (0%)	▼2	22.85	▼1.82	8,15,510	Opposition
2019	17th	Rahul Gandhi	5	0 / 6 (0%)	Steady	28.47	▲5.62	10,11,527	Opposition
2024	18th	Mallikarjun Kharge	2	0 / 5 (0%)	Steady	19.38	▼9.09	9,90,182	Opposition

== List of chief ministers ==
# (Note: A parenthetical number indicates that the incumbent has previously held office.)	Portrait	Name	Constituency	Tenure			Assembly	Ref
#	Portrait	Name	Constituency	From	To	Days in office	Assembly	Ref
1		Ghulam Mohammed Sadiq	Tankipora	30 March 1965	21 February 1967	6 years, 257 days	3rd (1962 election)	
1		Ghulam Mohammed Sadiq	Amira Kadal	21 February 1967	12 December 1971	6 years, 257 days	4th (1967 election)	
2		Syed Mir Qasim	Verinag	12 December 1971	17 June 1972	3 years, 75 days	4th (1967 election)	
2		Syed Mir Qasim	Verinag	17 June 1972	25 February 1975	3 years, 75 days	5th (1972 election)	
3		Ghulam Nabi Azad	Bhaderwah	2 November 2005	11 July 2008	2 years, 252 days	10th (2002 election)	

== List of deputy chief ministers ==
Sr. no.	Photo	Name	Took office	Left office	Duration	Ref
1		Mangat Ram Sharma	2 November 2002	2 November 2005	3 years, 0 days	
2		Tara Chand	5 January 2009	24 December 2014	5 years, 353 days	

== See also ==
- Indian National Congress
- Congress Working Committee
- All India Congress Committee
- Pradesh Congress Committee
