= Batmaloo Assembly constituency =

Constituency of the Jammu and Kashmir Legislative Assembly

Coordinates: 34.063°N 74.791°E

Batmaloo
- Former constituency for the Jammu and Kashmir Legislative Assembly

Constituency details
- Country: India
- State: Jammu and Kashmir
- District: Srinagar
- Established: 1996
- Abolished: 2018

Batmaloo was a legislative constituency in the Jammu and Kashmir Legislative Assembly of Jammu and Kashmir a north state of India. Batmaloo was also part of Srinagar Lok Sabha constituency.

== Members of the Legislative Assembly ==
Election	Member	Party
1996	Ghulam Mohi-Ud-Din Shah	Jammu & Kashmir National Conference
2002	Ghulam Mohi-Ud-Din Shah	Jammu & Kashmir National Conference
2004 By-election	Tariq Ahmed Kara	Jammu and Kashmir People's Democratic Party
2008	Mohammed Irfan Shah	Jammu & Kashmir National Conference
2014	Noor Mohammad Sheikh	Jammu and Kashmir People's Democratic Party

== Election results ==
=== Assembly Election 2014 ===
2014 Jammu and Kashmir Legislative Assembly election : Batmaloo
Party	Candidate	Votes	%	±%
JKPDP	Noor Mohammad Sheikh	12,542	42.56%	▲10.59
JKNC	Mohammed Irfan Shah	8,215	27.88%	▼16.95
Jammu & Kashmir Democratic Party Nationalist	Abdul Qayoom Bhat	1,409	4.78%	▲1.30
Independent	Mohammed Maqbool Shiekh	1,399	4.75%	New
BJP	Zubair Nazir Wani	1,304	4.43%	New
INC	Abdul Hamid Rather	1,204	4.09%	▼3.32
JKPC	Muzzaffar Ahmad Gazi	942	3.20%	New
Independent	Reyaz Ahmad Mir	764	2.59%	New
SP	Gulzar Ahmad Bangroo	458	1.55%	New
BSP	Mohammed Maqbool Rather	252	0.86%	▼0.32
Independent	Javaid Ahmad Dandru	209	0.71%	New
Margin of victory		4,327	14.68%	▲1.83
Turnout		29,466	24.48%	▲4.52
Registered electors		1,20,344		▲14.01
JKPDP gain from JKNC		Swing	▼2.27	

=== Assembly Election 2008 ===
2008 Jammu and Kashmir Legislative Assembly election : Batmaloo
Party	Candidate	Votes	%	±%
JKNC	Mohammed Irfan Shah	9,447	44.83%	▲15.99
JKPDP	Tariq Hameed Karra	6,738	31.97%	▼23.12
INC	Abdul Hamid Rather	1,561	7.41%	New
Jammu & Kashmir Democratic Party Nationalist	Aftab Jeelani Wani	733	3.48%	New
Independent	Mujeeb Ahmad Sidiqi	504	2.39%	New
BSP	Mohammed Yousuf Beigh	248	1.18%	New
Independent	Mohammed Yussouf Reshi	232	1.10%	New
JKANC	Javid Ahmad Ashai	230	1.09%	New
Independent	Mohammed Ashraf Beigh	226	1.07%	New
JKPDF	Ishtiyaq Ahmad Qadri	188	0.89%	New
Margin of victory		2,709	12.86%	▼13.41
Turnout		21,073	19.96%	▲8.24
Registered electors		1,05,556		▼0.54
JKNC gain from JKPDP		Swing	▼10.27	

=== Assembly By-election 2004 ===
2004 Jammu and Kashmir Legislative Assembly by-election : Batmaloo
Party	Candidate	Votes	%	±%
JKPDP	Tariq Ahmed Kara	6,856	55.10%	▲25.78
JKNC	Irfan Ahmed Shah	3,588	28.84%	▼20.67
Independent	Abdul Hamid Rather	570	4.58%	New
Independent	Abid Imtiyaz Bhat	333	2.68%	New
Independent	Ali Mohd. Khan	298	2.39%	New
Independent	Javid Ahmed Bhat	162	1.30%	New
Independent	Abdul Rashid Kabali	141	1.13%	New
Independent	Muzaffar Ali Shah	140	1.13%	New
JKNPP	Shameema Begam	100	0.80%	▼1.83
Margin of victory		3,268	26.26%	▲6.08
Turnout		12,443	11.72%	▲7.72
Registered electors		1,06,131		▲1.84
JKPDP gain from JKNC		Swing	▲5.59	

=== Assembly Election 2002 ===
2002 Jammu and Kashmir Legislative Assembly election : Batmaloo
Party	Candidate	Votes	%	±%
JKNC	Ghulam Mohi-Ud-Din Shah	2,065	49.51%	▼19.52
JKPDP	Tariq Hameed Karra	1,223	29.32%	New
INC	Ghulam Mohammed Sheikh	470	11.27%	▼0.08
JKNPP	Shameema Begum	110	2.64%	▼0.19
Independent	Molvi Mohammed Tariq Khan	83	1.99%	New
Independent	Gulzar Ahmad Khuroo	67	1.61%	New
Independent	Mohammed Yousuf Bhat	55	1.32%	New
SAP	Abdul Rahman Sheikh	53	1.27%	New
Independent	Mohammed Idress Bhat	45	1.08%	New
Margin of victory		842	20.19%	▼37.49
Turnout		4,171	4.00%	▼14.61
Registered electors		1,04,213		▲39.69
JKNC hold		Swing	▼19.52	

=== Assembly Election 1996 ===
1996 Jammu and Kashmir Legislative Assembly election : Batmaloo
Party	Candidate	Votes	%	±%
JKNC	Ghulam Mohi-Ud-Din Shah	9,583	69.03%	New
INC	Ghulam Mohammed Sheikh	1,576	11.35%	New
Independent	Gulzar Mohammed	1,299	9.36%	New
JD	Mehbooba	725	5.22%	New
JKNPP	Ashraf Ali Beigh	392	2.82%	New
Independent	Javed Iqbal	308	2.22%	New
Margin of victory		8,007	57.67%	
Turnout		13,883	19.44%	
Registered electors		74,601		
JKNC win (new seat)				

== See also ==
- Batmaloo
