= 1957 Jammu and Kashmir Legislative Assembly election =

State election in India

- 24 February – 25 March 1957

75 seats in Legislative Assembly 38 seats needed for a majority
- Turnout: 60-70%
	First party	Second party
Leader	Bakshi Ghulam Mohammad
Party	JKNC	Praja Parishad
Last election	75	0
Seats won	68	5
Seat change	▼7	▲5
	Third party
Party	Harijan Mandal
Last election	0
Seats won	1
Seat change	▲1
Prime Minister before election
Bakshi Ghulam Mohammad
JKNC
Elected Prime Minister
Bakshi Ghulam Mohammad
JKNC

The first elections for the Legislative Assembly of the Indian state of Jammu and Kashmir under its own Constitution were held in March–June 1957. Bakshi Ghulam Mohammad was appointed Prime Minister of Jammu and Kashmir.

== Background ==
The Constituent Assembly of Jammu and Kashmir, elected in 1951, which also functioned as the State's legislative assembly during its term of 6 years, dissolved itself in January 1957 having passed the State's Constitution.

Before that, in 1953, Sheikh Abdullah was dismissed as the Prime Minister by the Sadar-i-Riyasat Karan Singh because he had lost the majority in the Cabinet. The former deputy prime minister Bakshi Ghulam Mohammad was appointed in his place. Sheikh Abdullah, along with Mirza Afzal Beg and thirty-three other loyalists, was imprisoned by the incoming government.

After Mirza Afzal Beg was released in November 1954, he, along with G. M. Hamdani, formed the All Jammu and Kashmir Plebiscite Front, demanding self-determination for Kashmiris through a plebiscite organized under United Nations supervision. The Plebiscite Front counted seven sitting legislators among its members. Other parties joined them in support: the Kashmir Political Conference, the Kashmir Democratic Union and the Praja Socialist Party.

In 1955, the left-wing faction of the ruling Jammu & Kashmir National Conference, led by G. M. Sadiq, fell out with the leadership and resigned from the party's Working Committee. Sadiq had a volley of complaints against the party leadership, ranging from manhandling by the party's gangs, corruption, to authoritarian and unprincipled leadership. He also complained about the nomination procedures for the upcoming Legislative Assembly election.

== The election ==
The election was conducted by the State's Franchise Commission. Voting was scheduled in the Jammu Division on 25 March and in the Kashmir Valley on 30 March. Because of snow-bound conditions, the voting for 7 other seats was held in May. The final results were announced on 3 June.

Of the 75 seats of the Legislative Assembly, 43 seats were allocated to the Kashmir Valley, 30 to Jammu, and 2 to Ladakh. The election irregularities first witnessed in the Constituent Assembly elections in 1951 continued. Scholar Sumantra Bose states that the franchise official in charge of deciding the validity of nomination papers was a henchman of Prime Minister Bakshi Ghulam Mohammad. In the Valley, elections in 30 seats were unopposed, resulting in wins for the National Conference; an additional 10 seats were declared unopposed after the rejection of the nomination papers of the opposing candidates. Three of these candidates were rejected on the grounds of being under the qualifying age, six due to improper nomination papers, and one on the grounds of being a government contractor. On the whole, the National Conference acquired a majority in the Assembly even before the voting began.

Of the 28 remaining seats that witnessed voting in March, 20 were in Jammu and 8 in the Kashmir Valley. The Jammu Praja Parishad put forward 17 candidates, the Praja Socialist Party 8 candidates, and the Harijan Mandal 6 candidates. The Plebiscite Front and the Kashmir Political Conference boycotted the election.

== Results ==
In the Jammu Division, the National Conference won 13 of the 20 seats, the Praja Parishad won 6 seats, and the Harijan Mandal won 1 seat. The voting was heavy, with over 70 percent of voters casting their votes. One of the Praja Parishad electees later joined the National Conference, reducing its strength in the Assembly to 5.

In the Kashmir Valley, the National Conference won 7 of the 8 contested seats, and one seat was won by a dissident of the National Conference contesting as an independent.

Scholar Jyoti Bhusan Das Gupta attributes the victory of the National Conference in the Jammu Division to the conciliatory gestures of the Bakshi Ghulam Mohammad, which were in marked contrast to Sheikh Abdullah's hard-line attitude. James Roach points out that Bakshi's National Conference firmly stood for the State's accession to India. It also capitalized on the economic and social advances that the party had implemented.

== Government formation ==
Bakshi Ghulam Mohammad was reappointed as the Prime Minister in July 1957. Shyam Lal Saraf was reappointed as a Cabinet Minister along with five new appointees: Din Nath Mahajan, Mir Ghulam Mohammed Rajpuri, Kotwal Chuni Lal, and Khwaja Shamsuddin.

The members of the leftist faction of the National Conference: G. M. Sadiq, Girdhari Lal Dogra, Mir Qasim and D. P. Dhar was excluded from the Cabinet. It has been reported, however, that Sadiq and Dogra were offered Cabinet posts, but they declined.

== Bibliography ==
- Bose, Sumantra (2003). Kashmir: Roots of Conflict, Paths to Peace. Harvard University Press. doi:10.2307/j.ctv1p6hp3k. ISBN 9780674011731. JSTOR j.ctv1p6hp3k.
- Das Gupta, Jyoti Bhusan (2012) [first published 1968]. Jammu and Kashmir. Springer. doi:10.1007/978-94-011-9231-6. ISBN 978-94-011-9231-6.
