= Noor Mohammad Sheikh =

Indian politician (born 1966)

Noor Mohammad Sheikh (born 1966) is an Indian politician from Jammu and Kashmir. He was a member of the Jammu and Kashmir Legislative Assembly from Batmaloo Assembly constituency in Srinagar district. He won the 2014 Jammu and Kashmir Legislative Assembly election representing the Jammu and Kashmir People's Democratic Party.

== Early life and education ==
Sheikh is from Batmaloo, Srinagar district, Jammu and Kashmir. He is the son of Gulam Nabi Sheikh. He completed his Class 10 in 1982 and later discontinued his studies.

== Career ==
Sheikh won from Batmaloo Assembly constituency representing the Jammu and Kashmir People's Democratic Party in the 2014 Jammu and Kashmir Legislative Assembly election. He polled 12,542 votes and defeated his nearest rival, Mohammad Irfan Shah of the J&K National Conference, by a margin of 4,327 votes. Later, he left the PDP following the abrogation of Article 370. In 2024 Jammu and Kashmir Legislative Assembly election, he contested in the Central Shalteng Assembly constituency as an independent candidate after he resigned in August 2024, from the Jammu and Kashmir Apni Party. He could finish only third, behind winner Tariq Hameed Karra of the Indian National Congress and another independent, Mohammed Irfan Shah, who finished second.
