= All Jammu and Kashmir Plebiscite Front =

- Patron: Sheikh Abdullah
- Founder: Mirza Afzal Beg
- Founded: 9 August 1955
- Dissolved: 1975
- Merged into: Jammu & Kashmir National Conference
- Political position: Called for a plebiscite on whether Kashmir should remain in India, join Pakistan or become independent.

The All Jammu and Kashmir Plebiscite Front, or Plebiscite Front, was a political party in the Indian state of Jammu and Kashmir that called for a "popular plebiscite" to decide if the state should remain part of India, join Pakistan or become independent. The patron of the party was Sheikh Abdullah, the former Prime Minister of Jammu and Kashmir and chief of the Jammu and Kashmir National Conference, even though he never formally joined it. The founder of the party was Mirza Afzal Beg.

== Foundation ==
The Plebiscite Front was founded on 9 August 1955 by Mirza Afzal Beg, a senior leader of the National Conference and lieutenant of Sheikh Abdullah, and formally launched in 1958. This followed the 1953 ouster of Sheikh Abdullah from the post of Prime Minister and subsequent arrest by police. While Abdullah commanded the loyalty of its members and guided its politics, Afzal Beg remained the titular president of the Plebiscite Front.

== Political stands ==
The Plebiscite Front became the principal opposition to the state government, headed by Bakshi Ghulam Mohammad (1953–63), Khwaja Shamsuddin (1963-64) and Ghulam Mohammed Sadiq (1964–71). The Front called for a plebiscite or referendum to be held under the auspices of the United Nations, to decide the issue of sovereignty over Jammu and Kashmir. Sheikh Abdullah's demand for a plebiscite led to the boycotting of state elections in the 1960s by large numbers of the state's population. However, this enabled easy election victories for the National Conference, which was supported by the Union government and remained in power for most of the decade.

== Indira-Sheikh accord ==
By 1972, the Plebiscite Front had come to the position that any plebiscite was not intended to contest Kashmir's accession to India. Afzal Beg stated that while a plebiscite would put Kashmir's accession into India on "a lasting foundation", his party was no longer insisting on holding a plebiscite. The Indian Prime Minister Indira Gandhi welcomed the Front's willingness to confirm Indian sovereignty and held talks with Sheikh Abdullah. The 1974 Indira-Sheikh accord confirmed the support of Sheikh Abdullah and the Plebiscite Front for Indian sovereignty over Kashmir and ended the demand for a plebiscite in return for extensive autonomy and self-government under Article 370 of the Constitution of India

== Dissolution ==
Following the agreement with the Union government, Sheikh Abdullah merged the Plebiscite Front into a renewed National Conference in 1975, which won the democratic elections and affirmed Abdullah as the new Chief Minister of Jammu and Kashmir. Mirza Afzal Beg became the Deputy Chief Minister of Jammu and Kashmir.

== See also ==
- Kashmir conflict
- Azad Kashmir Plebiscite Front

== Bibliography ==
- Schofield, Victoria (2003) [First published in 2000], Kashmir in Conflict, London and New York: I. B. Taurus & Co, ISBN 1860648983
