= Harijan Mandal =

Dissolved Indian political party

The Harijan Mandal was an Ambedkarite political party in Jammu and Kashmir. The party was founded in 1951. It was modelled on the Scheduled Castes Federation. Unlike its predecessor, the All Jammu and Kashmir Harijan Mandal (founded in the 1920s), this organization was oriented towards electoral politics. It was led by Babu Milkhi Ram (president), Munshi Ram, Major Singh and Sain Das. The party was concentrated in Jammu. It was opposed to the Jammu Praja Parishad, which was dominated by upper caste Hindus. The party received government support during the reign of Bakshi Ghulam Mohammad.

== Electoral history ==
The party fielded two candidates in the 1952 Jammu and Kashmir Constituent Assembly election, Milkhi Ram being one of them. Both were defeated by Jammu and Kashmir National Conference candidates by large margins. The party had received support from the Praja Parishad, which had withdrawn its candidates from the election. The party won one seat (Babu Milkhi Ram, representing Jammu tehsil) in the 1957 Jammu and Kashmir assembly election. It had contested all four seats reserves for Scheduled Castes. The election symbol of party was a standing lion.

== Coalition politics ==
The party contested the 1962 Jammu and Kashmir Legislative Assembly election as a constituent of the United Socialist Front (a coalition led by the Praja Socialist Party, and which also included the Akali Dal). The party fielded ten candidates, but none was elected. All in all, they got 13,743 votes (1.89% of the votes in the state).

== Dissolution ==
After the 1962 election the party entered a phase of decline. It was dissolved in 1970. Milkhi Ram later joined the Republican Party of India (RPI). In 1984 after formation of Bahujan Samaj Party (BSP), the Jammu unit of RPI merged into BSP under Kanshi Ram.

== See also ==
- List of Scheduled Castes in Jammu and Kashmir
- Bahujan Samaj Party
