= Jammu and Kashmir (princely state) =

Princely state in South Asia (1846–1947)

- 1846–1947
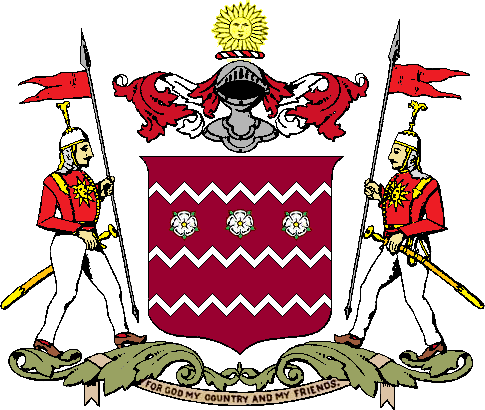
- Top: 1846‍–‍1936; Bottom: 1936‍–‍1947 Coat of arms

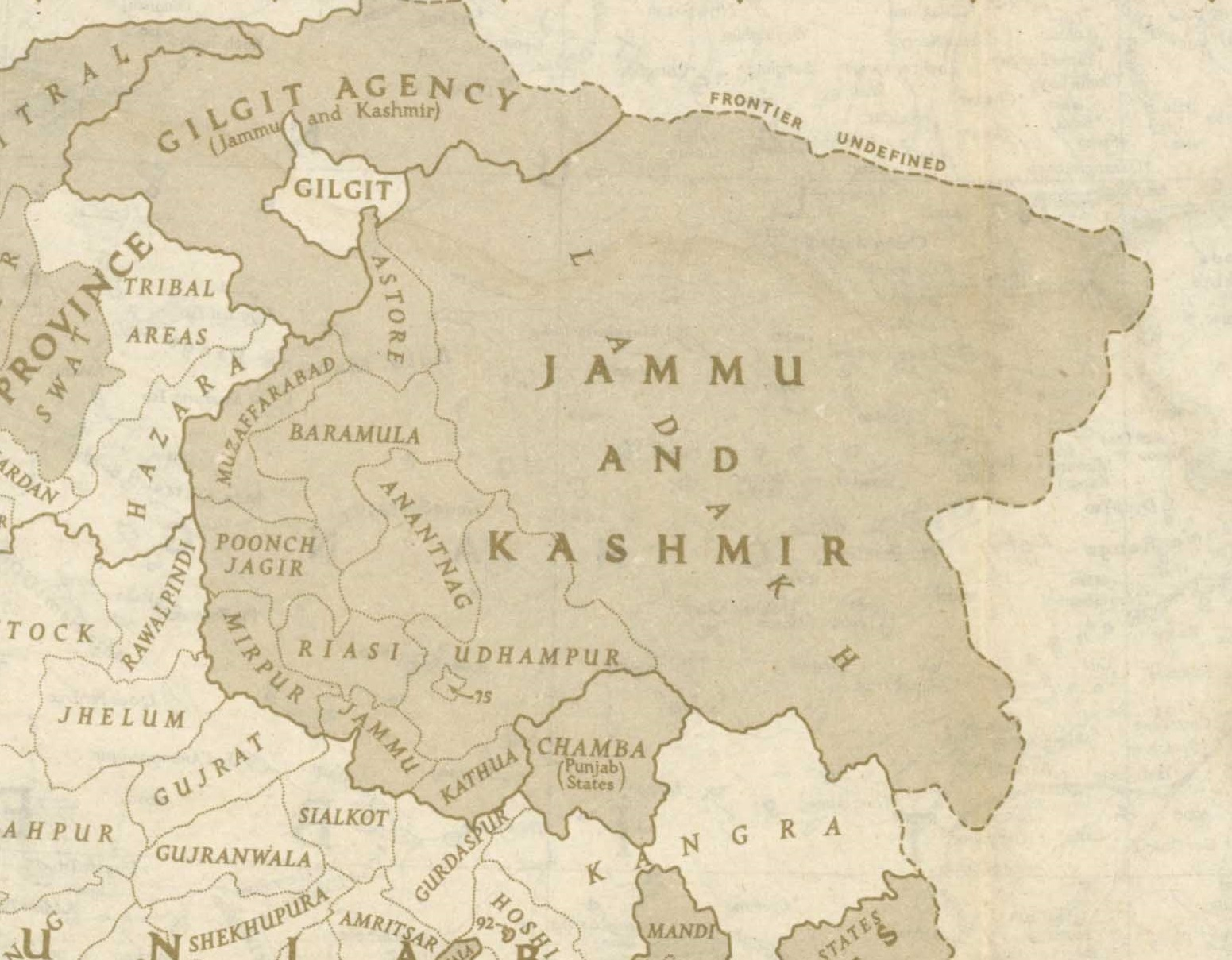
- Jammu and Kashmir in 1946
- Status: Princely state
- Capital: Srinagar; Jammu
- Common languages: Kashmiri; Dogri; Ladakhi; Balti; Shina; Paharhi (Note: namely the Paharhi-Pothwari variety); Gojri
- Religion: Islam (majority), Hinduism, Buddhism, Jainism, Sikhism
- Government: Monarchy
- Maharaja
  - 1846–1857: Gulab Singh (first)
  - 1925–1947: Hari Singh (last)
- Dewan
  - 1917–1921: Daljit Singh (first)
  - 1947: Mehr Chand Mahajan (last)
- History
  - Foundation of Jammu and Kashmir: 16 March 1846
  - End of British Crown Suzerainty: 15 August 1947
  - Beginning of the First Kashmir War: 22 October 1947
  - Accession to the Indian Union as a state: 27 October 1947
Preceded by	Succeeded by
1846: Jammu vassal of Sikh Empire	1947: Jammu and Kashmir (state); Azad Jammu and Kashmir
- Today part of: Disputed; see Kashmir conflict

Jammu and Kashmir, also known as Kashmir and Jammu, was a princely state in a subsidiary alliance with the British East India Company from 1846 to 1858, and under the paramountcy (or tutelage) of the British Crown from 1858 until British withdrawal and the partition of British India in 1947. Following the subsequent First Kashmir War between India and Pakistan, it became a disputed territory, now administered by three countries: China, India, and Pakistan. After the First Anglo-Sikh War, the British East India Company annexed the Kashmir Valley from the Sikhs as war reparations, on 9 March 1846. Jammu and Kashmir was later formed when Kashmir was sold to the Raja of Jammu, Gulab Singh, for 75 lakh rupees, on 16 March 1846.

At the time of the partition of India and the political integration of India, Hari Singh, the ruler of the state, delayed making a decision about the future of his state. However, an uprising in the western districts against Hari Singh supported by informal militias and Pakistani troops from the neighbouring Northwest Frontier Province forced his hand. On 26 October 1947, Hari Singh acceded to India in return for the Indian military being airlifted to Kashmir to counter the invasion from Pakistan. The western and northern districts now known as Azad Kashmir and Gilgit-Baltistan passed to the control of Pakistan with the support of Gilgit Scouts, while the remaining territory stayed under Indian control, later becoming the Indian-administered state of Jammu and Kashmir. India and Pakistan defined a ceasefire line that divided the administration of the territory with the intercession of the United Nations which was supposed to be temporary but still persists.

== Administration ==
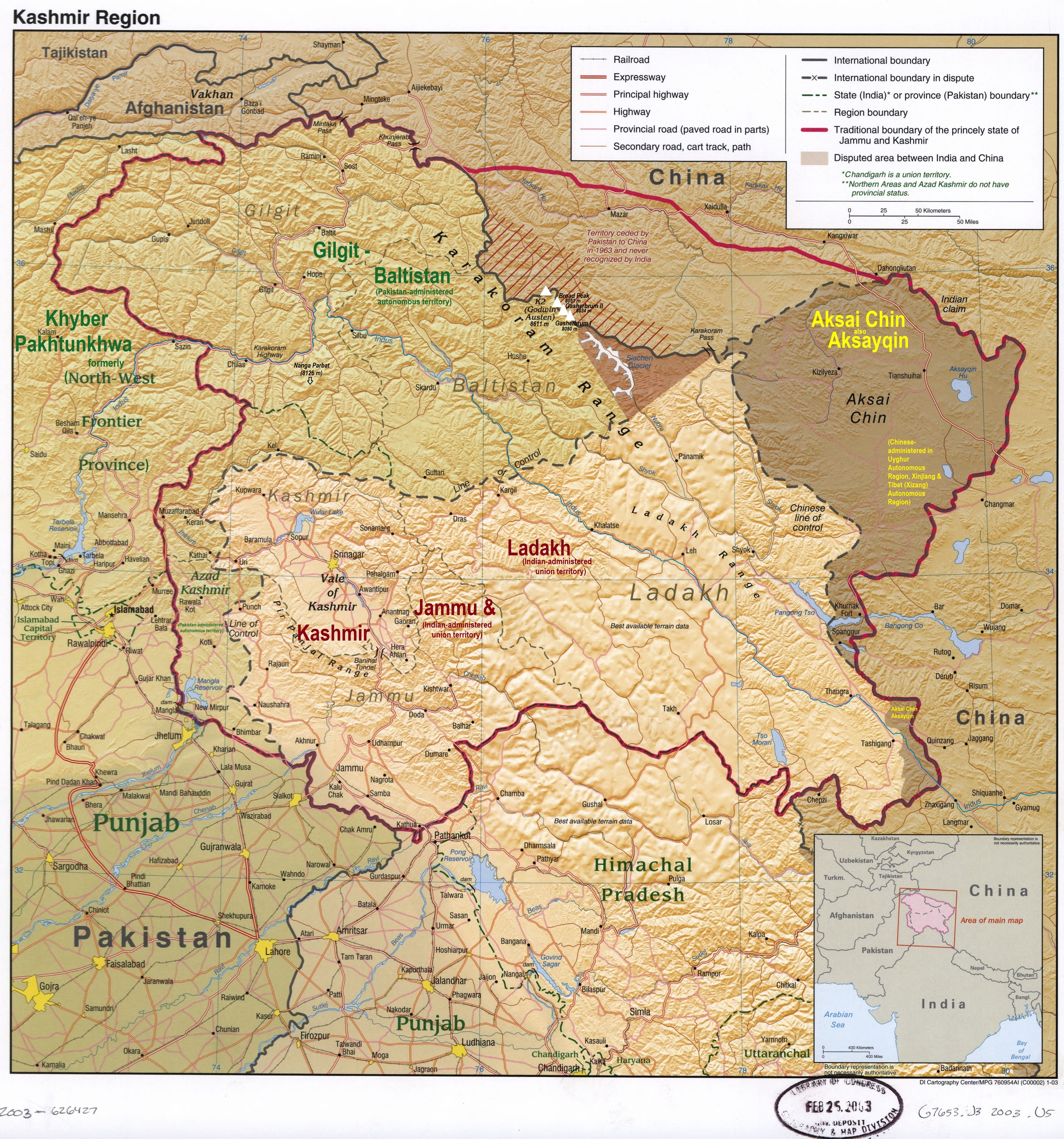
Map of Kashmir showing the borders of the princely state in dark red.

According to the census reports of 1911, 1921 and 1931, the administration was organised as follows:

- Jammu province: Wazarats (Districts) of Jammu, Jasrota (Kathua), Udhampur, Reasi and Mirpur.
- Kashmir province: Wazarats of Kashmir South (Anantnag), Kashmir North (Baramulla) and Muzaffarabad.
- Frontier wazarats: Wazarats of Ladakh and Gilgit.
- Internal jagirs: Poonch, Bhaderwah and Chenani.

In the 1941 census, further details of the frontier wazarats were given:

- Ladakh wazarat: Tehsils of Leh, Skardu and Kargil.
- Gilgit wazarat: Tehsils of Gilgit and Astore
- Frontier illaqas: (under the Gilgit Agency) Punial, Ishkoman, Yasin, Kuh-Ghizer, Hunza, Nagar, Chilas.

=== Prime ministers of the Princely State of Jammu and Kashmir (1917–1947) ===
#	Name	Took office	Left office
1	Raja Sir Daljit Singh	1917	1921
2	Raja Hari Singh	1925	1927
3	Sir Albion Banerjee	January 1927	March 1929
4	G. E. C. Wakefield	1929	1931
5	Hari Krishan Kaul	1931	1932
6	Elliot James Dowell Colvin	1932	1936
7	Sir Barjor J. Dalal	1936	1936
8	Sir N. Gopalaswami Ayyangar	1937	July 1943
9	Kailash Narain Haksar	July 1943	February 1944
10	Sir B. N. Rau	February 1944	28 June 1945
11	Ram Chandra Kak	28 June 1945	11 August 1947
12	Janak Singh	11 August 1947	15 October 1947
13	Mehr Chand Mahajan	15 October 1947	27 October 1947

== Demographics ==
=== Population ===
Historical population
Year	Pop.	±%
1873	1,534,972 (Note: According to the 1891 census report, population enumeration during the 1873 census was noted to have not been reliable.)	—
1891	2,543,952	+65.7%
1901	2,905,578	+14.2%
1911	3,158,126	+8.7%
1921	3,320,518	+5.1%
1931	3,646,243	+9.8%
1941	4,021,616	+10.3%
Sources: Census in British India

Population of Jammu & Kashmir Princely State by Province (1873–1941)
Census Year	Jammu Province		Kashmir Province		Frontier Regions		Jammu & Kashmir Princely State	
Census Year	Pop.	%	Pop.	%	Pop.	%	Pop.	%
1873	938,641	61.15%	491,846	32.04%	104,485	6.81%	1,534,972	100%
1891	1,439,543	56.59%	949,041	37.31%	155,368	6.11%	2,543,952	100%
1901	1,521,307	52.36%	1,157,394	39.83%	226,877	7.81%	2,905,578	100%
1911	1,597,865	50.6%	1,295,201	41.01%	265,060	8.39%	3,158,126	100%
1921	1,640,259	49.4%	1,407,086	42.38%	273,173	8.23%	3,320,518	100%
1931	1,788,441	49.05%	1,569,218	43.04%	288,584	7.91%	3,646,243	100%
1941	1,981,433	49.27%	1,728,705	42.99%	311,478	7.75%	4,021,616	100%

=== Religion ===
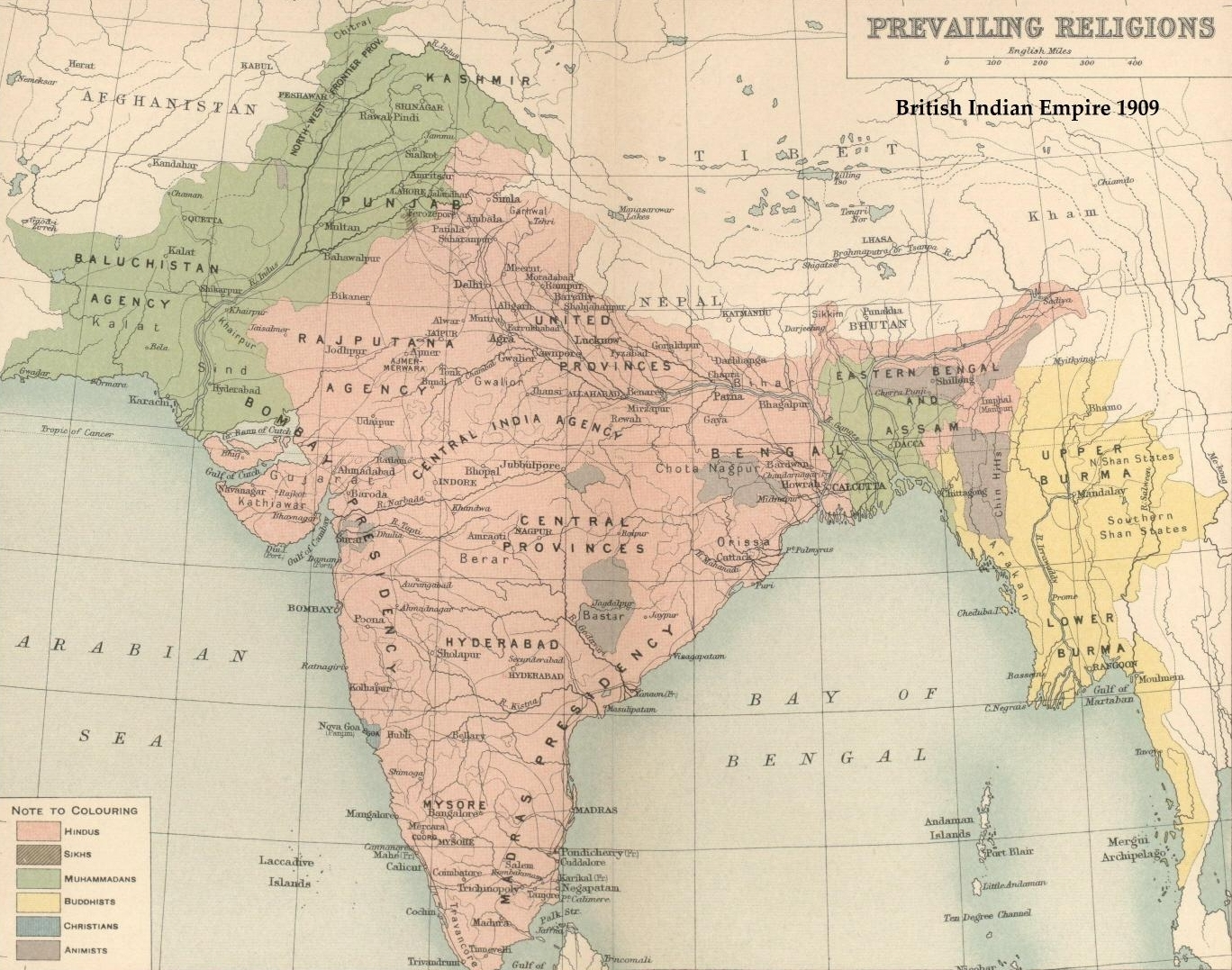
Map of India according to religious affiliations in various regions in 1909

Religious groups in Jammu & Kashmir Princely State (British India era)
Religious group	1891		1901		1911		1921		1931		1941	
Religious group	Pop.	%	Pop.	%	Pop.	%	Pop.	%	Pop.	%	Pop.	%
Islam	1,793,710	70.51%	2,154,695	74.16%	2,398,320	75.94%	2,548,514	76.75%	2,817,636	77.28%	3,101,247	77.11%
Hinduism	691,800	27.19%	689,073	23.72%	690,390	21.86%	692,641	20.86%	736,222	20.19%	809,165	20.12%
Buddhism	29,608	1.16%	35,047	1.21%	36,512	1.16%	37,685	1.13%	38,724	1.06%	40,696	1.01%
Tribal	16,615	0.65%	—N/a	—N/a	—N/a	—N/a	—N/a	—N/a	134	0%	51	0%
Sikhism	11,399	0.45%	25,828	0.89%	31,553	1%	39,507	1.19%	50,662	1.39%	65,903	1.64%
Jainism	593	0.02%	442	0.02%	345	0.01%	529	0.02%	597	0.02%	910	0.02%
Christianity	218	0.01%	422	0.01%	975	0.03%	1,634	0.05%	2,263	0.06%	3,509	0.09%
Zoroastrianism	9	0%	11	0%	31	0%	7	0%	5	0%	29	0%
Judaism	—N/a	—N/a	—N/a	—N/a	—N/a	—N/a	—N/a	—N/a	—N/a	—N/a	10	0%
Others	0	0%	60	0%	0	0%	1	0%	0	0%	95	0%
Total population	2,543,952	100%	2,905,578	100%	3,158,126	100%	3,320,518	100%	3,646,243	100%	4,021,616	100%
Note: The Princely State of Jammu and Kashmir includes the contemporary administrative divisions of Jammu, Kashmir, Ladakh, Azad Kashmir, and Gilgit-Baltistan.

== See also ==
- List of political parties in Jammu and Kashmir (princely state)
- Revocation of the special status of Jammu and Kashmir
- Dogra dynasty
- Jammu and Kashmir Bodyguard Cavalry

== Bibliography ==
- Behera, Navnita Chadha (2007), Demystifying Kashmir, Pearson Education India, ISBN 978-8131708460, archived from the original on 17 January 2023
- Das Gupta, Jyoti Bhusan (2012), Jammu and Kashmir, Springer, ISBN 978-94-011-9231-6
- Birdwood, Lord (1956), Two Nations and Kashmir, R. Hale
- Huttenback, Robert A. (1961), "Gulab Singh and the Creation of the Dogra State of Jammu, Kashmir, and Ladakh" (PDF), The Journal of Asian Studies, 20 (4): 477–488, doi:10.2307/2049956, JSTOR 2049956, S2CID 162144034, archived from the original (PDF) on 15 August 2016
- Mahajan, Mehr Chand (1963), Looking Back: The Autobiography of Mehr Chand Mahajan, Former Chief Justice of India, Asia Publishing House
- Major, Andrew J. (1996), Return to Empire: Punjab under the Sikhs and British in the Mid-nineteenth Century Limited, New Delhi: Sterling Publishers, ISBN 81-207-1806-2
  - Major, Andrew J. (1981), Return to Empire: Punjab under the Sikhs and British in the Mid-nineteenth Century, Australian National University, doi:10.25911/5d74e5bedfa9d, archived from the original on 19 December 2019
- Noorani, A. G. (2011), Article 370: A Constitutional History of Jammu and Kashmir, Oxford University Press, ISBN 978-0-19-807408-3, archived from the original on 19 April 2020
- Panikkar, K. M. (1930). Gulab Singh. London: Martin Hopkinson Ltd.
- Raghavan, Srinath (2010), War and Peace in Modern India, Palgrave Macmillan, pp. 101–, ISBN 978-1-137-00737-7
- Rai, Mridu (2004), Hindu Rulers, Muslim Subjects: Islam, Rights, and the History of Kashmir, C. Hurst & Co, ISBN 1850656614
- Schofield, Victoria (2003) [First published in 2000], Kashmir in Conflict, London and New York: I. B. Taurus & Co, ISBN 1860648983
- Singh, Bawa Satinder (1971), "Raja Gulab Singh's Role in the First Anglo-Sikh War", Modern Asian Studies, 5 (1): 35–59, doi:10.1017/s0026749x00002845, JSTOR 311654, S2CID 145500298

This article incorporates text from the Imperial Gazetteer of India, a publication now in the public domain.
