= Mirza Afzal Beg =

Indian politician (1908–1982)

Mirza Afzal Beigh
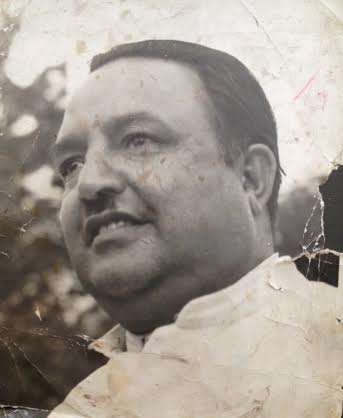
- Mirza Afzal Beg

Deputy Chief Minister of Jammu and Kashmir
- In office 25 February 1975 – 25 September 1978
- Governor: L. K. Jha
- Chief Minister: Sheikh Abdullah
- Preceded by: Office established
- Succeeded by: Position vacant (next: Devi Das Thakur in 1984)

President of All Jammu and Kashmir Plebiscite Front
- In office 1955–1975
- Preceded by: Office established
- Succeeded by: Office dissolved

Member of Jammu and Kashmir Legislative Assembly
- In office 31 October 1951 – 9 August 1953
- Constituency: Anantnag

Revenue Minister of Jammu and Kashmir
- In office 1948–1953
- Leader: Sheikh Abdullah
- Sadr-i-Riyasat: Karan Singh

Member of the Constituent Assembly of India
- In office 1946–1952
- President: Rajendra Prasad

President of Jammu and Kashmir National Conference
- In office 1975–1977

Minister for Public Works Princely State of J&K
- In office 1942–1944

Personal details
- Born: 3 February 1929 Anantnag, British India
- Died: 11 June 1982 (aged 53) Srinagar, India
- Party: Jammu and Kashmir National Conference (until 1953, after 1975)
- Other political affiliations: Plebiscite Front (1955–1975)
- Relatives: Mirza Mehboob Beg (son)
- Education: Aligarh Muslim University
- Known for: Indira–Sheikh Accord

Mirza Mohammad Afzal Beigh (Note: Pronounced /ˈmɪrzə moʊˈhæməd æfˈzæl bɛɡ/; Urdu: مرزا محمد افضل بیگ, romanized: Mirzā Moḥammad Afzāl Beg also known in Kashmir as Fakhr-e-Kashmir (transl. Pride of Kashmir) (3 February 1929 – 11 June 1982) was a Kashmiri politician who served as the first deputy chief minister of Jammu and Kashmir from 1975 to 1977 and was a member of Constituent Assembly of India from 1946 to 1952. Beigh held a ministerial position in the pre-independence government of the princely state of Jammu and Kashmir from 1945 to 1947 and later served as the Revenue minister in the post-independence government led by Sheikh Abdullah from 1948 to 1953. After the dismissal of the Sheikh Abdullah government, Beigh established the All Jammu and Kashmir Plebiscite Front in 1955, which later merged into the present-day National Conference.

Beg drafted the 1952 Delhi Agreement, which resulted in the Article 370 of the Constitution of India. He was a member of the Jammu and Kashmir Constituent Assembly, which was responsible for drafting the constitution of Jammu and Kashmir from 1951 to 1956. He also drafted 1950 land reforms, including the Big Landed Estates Abolition Act during his tenure as Revenue minister. Beg was Sheikh Abdullah's interlocuter for the negotiations with Government of India represented by G. Parthasarathy, which resulted in the Indira–Sheikh Accord in 1975 and the rehabilitation of Abdullah as the political leader in Kashmir.

== Early life and education ==
Beg was born to Mirza Jalaluddin Beg on 3 February 1929 in Anantnag, British India. He was the brother of Mirza Ghulam Kadir Beg and nephew of the landlord, Mirza Ghulam Muhammad Beg, a landlord in Anantnag.

He graduated from Sri Pratap College (SP College) in Srinagar. He later attended Aligarh Muslim University (AMU), where he studied law.

== Career ==
Beg began his political career in the late 1930s when he became an active member of the Jammu and Kashmir National Conference, a party led by Sheikh Mohammad Abdullah. During this period, he reportedly worked to address the grievances of the local populace and promote social justice.

In 1951, Beg was elected as a member of the Jammu and Kashmir Legislative Assembly after contesting the 1951 constituent assembly elections. He represented Anantnag constituency from 1951 to 1953.

=== Princely state ===
Beg joined Sheikh Abdullah's Muslim Conference from its inception. In 1934 elections, he was elected to the Praja Sabha and served as the deputy leader of the parliamentary party. In 1937–38, after Gopalaswami Ayyangar became the prime minister of the state, Mirza Afzal Beg and Girdhari Lal Dogra were appointed cabinet ministers.

Soon after the 1938 election, Sheikh Abdullah, along with other members, launched an initiative to transform the Muslim Conference into an inclusive nationalist party, to be called the National Conference. (Note: In Indian terminology, inclusive nationalism tends to be called "secularism".) The Muslim nationalist members, including Choudhry Ghulam Abbas, opposed the move. Afzal Beg is said to have counselled caution, fearing a vertical division of the party. Despite the apprehensions, the special session of the party convened in June 1939, overwhelmingly passed a resolution transforming itself into National Conference.

In 1944, Beg was appointed a cabinet minister again and given the charge of Public Works and Municipalities. In March 1946, after Pandit Ram Chandra Kak was appointed the prime minister, the National Conference pulled out of the government and launched its Quit Kashmir movement. Beg stepped down from his ministerial post for this development. He was arrested for taking part in the movement.

=== Association with Abdullah ===
Beg was a close associate of Sheikh Mohammad Abdullah, the founder of the Jammu and Kashmir National Conference (NC). Together, they reportedly played a central roles in advocating for the rights of the people of Kashmir. Beg was one of the close members in the Quit Kashmir movement of 1946, which demanded the end of autocratic rule under the Dogra dynasty. After India's independence and the accession of Jammu and Kashmir to India in 1947, Beg aligned closely with Abdullah's political strategy for maintaining the state's autonomy within the Indian union.

== Arrest and Plebiscite Front ==
In 1953, following the controversial dismissal and arrest of Sheikh Abdullah by the Indian government, Beg was also detained. During this period, the political situation in Jammu and Kashmir changed significantly, with the National Conference leadership being sidelined. After Abdullah's release, Beg formed the Plebiscite Front in 1955, advocating for a plebiscite to determine whether Jammu and Kashmir should remain part of India or join Pakistan. This movement reflected a broader sentiment of political disenchantment in the region. The Plebiscite Front, however, created significant political opposition, particularly from pro-Indian factions. It faced social boycotts and political isolation, with many of its members enduring hardships under government repression.

He was one of the key members of the movement, which sought to determine the political status of Jammu and Kashmir.

=== Reconciliation ===
Beg played a central role in the negotiations that led to the 1974 Indira–Sheikh Accord between Sheikh Abdullah and prime minister Indira Gandhi. He co-authored the Indira–Sheikh Accord with G. Parthasarathy, facilitating Abdullah's return to political power and aiming to reconcile the political status of Jammu and Kashmir with those of the Indian government. The accord acknowledged Article 370 of the Indian constitution, which guaranteed special status to Jammu and Kashmir.

While the 1974 Accord enabled a political reconciliation between the state and the central government, it was seen as a compromised decision by some people in the region. The tensions within the region persisted, and in the years following the accord, political rifts resurfaced.

On 15 February 1975, after the Plebiscite Front's Executive Council approved the accord, Beg officially announced the dissolution of the organization, bringing an end to two decades of political opposition. Following this, Sheikh Abdullah was reinstated as chief minister of Jammu and Kashmir.

=== Tenure as deputy chief and dismissal ===
Beg was one of the founding members of the Jammu and Kashmir National Conference. In 1977, he became deputy chief minister of Jammu and Kashmir from 1975 until September 1978. His tenure witnessed political challenges and internal party conflicts within the National Conference.

During his time in office, Beg focused on various administrative reforms in the region. However, tensions between him and chief minister Sheikh Abdullah began to surface, leading to political rifts within the National Conference.

In September 1978, Beg was dismissed from his position as deputy chief minister amid accusations of disloyalty. The dismissal followed a period of increasing public criticism by Beg directed toward Sheikh Abdullah and his administration. Abdullah publicly rejected attempts for rapprochement between himself and Beg.

Following his dismissal, Abdullah described Beg's actions as a "dangerous attempt" to disrupt the unity and discipline of the National Conference. Abdullah had previously named Maulvi Mohammed Yasin Hamdari, a member of the Legislative Assembly, as the chief witness to these allegations against Beg. The chief minister's refusal to engage in peace talks with Beg suggested the conflict and the implications of Beg's public denunciations of the National Conference leadership.

In response to his dismissal, Beg was unrepentant and began to formulate a new political strategy. He announced the formation of a new party called the Inqalab National Conference, intending to challenge Abdullah's leadership. Beg expressed his responsibility to combat what he described as "dynastic rule" and aimed to promote democratic norms in the region. He outlined a 20-point program for his new party, focusing on anti-corruption measures and administrative reforms.

Despite some initial success in drawing crowds to his meetings, Beg faced challenges in gaining widespread support from the electorate. Many constituents, though not known, were apprehensive about openly opposing Abdullah and his supporters due to the prevailing political climate.

Beg believed that any significant challenge to Abdullah's authority would require support from the central government. However, indications suggested that the central government preferred to maintain the status quo in Jammu and Kashmir, refraining from interference in what it considered internal political matters.

== Death ==
Beg died on 11 June 1982. He is survived by three sons and three daughters. His son Mirza Mehboob Beg is also a politician in the state.

== Bibliography ==
- Das Gupta, Jyoti Bhusan (2012) [first published 1968], Jammu and Kashmir, Springer, ISBN 978-94-011-9231-6
- Hussain, Syed Taffazull (2016), Sheikh Abdullah-A Biography: The Crucial Period 1905-1939. 2016 Edition, Syed Taffazull Hussain, ISBN 978-1-60481-603-7
- Parashar, Parmanand (2004), Kashmir and the Freedom Movement, Sarup & Sons, ISBN 978-81-7625-514-1
