= Ghizer =

Ghizer may refer to several divisions and places in Gilgit-Baltistan, Pakistan:

- Ghizer District (2019–), a current district of Gilgit-Baltistan
  - Ghizer Tehsil, 04 tehsil at Ghizer District
  - Gahkuch is Headquarter of District Ghizer.
- Ghizer District (1974–2019), a former district of Gilgit-Baltistan
- Ghizer River, an alternative name of Upper Gilgit River
- Ghizer Valley or Koh-i-Ghizer
