= Bakshi Ghulam Mohammad =

Indian politician

- Sadar-i-Riyasat Karan Singh administers the oath of office to Bakshi Ghulam Mohammed, after the 1957 elections in Jammu and Kashmir.

Prime Minister of Jammu and Kashmir
- In office 9 August 1953 – 12 October 1963
- President: Karan Singh
- Preceded by: Sheikh Abdullah
- Succeeded by: Khwaja Shamsuddin

Deputy Prime Minister of Jammu and Kashmir
- In office 5 March 1948 – 9 August 1953
- Prime Minister: Sheikh Abdullah

Personal details
- Born: 20 July 1907 Srinagar, Jammu and Kashmir
- Died: 20 July 1972 (aged 65) Jammu and Kashmir, India
- Party: Jammu & Kashmir National Conference

Bakshi Ghulam Mohammad (20 July 1907 – 15 July 1972) was an Indian politician who served as the prime minister of Jammu and Kashmir from 1953 to 1964. Bakshi was a founding member of the National Conference and rose to be the second in command to the principal leader Sheikh Abdullah. He served as the deputy prime minister of the State of Jammu and Kashmir between 1947 and 1953, but disagreed with Abdullah's advocacy of independence for the state in 1953. He staged a 'coup' with the help of the head of state Karan Singh, resulting in the dismissal and imprisonment of Sheikh Abdullah. Bakshi was the longest serving prime minister, whose rule saw the formulation of the constitution of Jammu and Kashmir and a normalisation of relations of Jammu and Kashmir with the Indian government.

== Early life ==
Bakshi Ghulam Mohammad was born in 1907 in a lower middle class family in the Safakadal area of Srinagar (in the then princely state of Jammu and Kashmir). His father, Abdul Ghaffar Bakshi, was said to have been unemployed. Bakshi had six siblings, four brothers and two sisters.

He was educated at C.M.S Tyndale Biscoe School upto eighth grade, which was considered a reasonable qualification at that time. He started his career as a school teacher in Christian missionary schools in Skardu and Leh. Due to family pressure, he returned to Srinagar and got married.

In 1925, he served in the Kashmir branch of the All India Spinners’ Association and worked as a karyakarta at Gandhi Ashram in Srinagar, which was founded and based on Mahatma Gandhi’s principles for appropriate technology to tackle rural poverty. He was exposed to the ideas of Indian National Congress and Mahatma Gandhi during this time. He earned the epithet of "Kashmiri Gandhi" for his calls to boycott British goods.

== Politics in the princely state ==
In 1927 Bakshi joined Sheikh Mohammed Abdullah in the agitation for securing civic and political rights for the state's Muslim population, which culminated in the formation of the Muslim Conference. Bakshi Ghulam Mohammad displayed talent for organisation during this period. He organised the students and workers and set up their unions. He was arrested several times during the freedom struggle including a sixteen-month term in Reasi sub-jail. Within the Muslim Conference party he earned the sobriquet "Khalid-e-Kashmir" after Khalid bin Walid, the great Muslim general.

By 1938, people of all communities had joined the demand for responsible government, which had spread all over the state and the Muslim Conference's name was altered to National Conference. Bakshi Ghulam Mohammad worked underground during this period, keeping a step ahead of the state police. In 1946, during the "Quit Kashmir" movement, Bakshi Ghulam Mohammad escaped to British India when a warrant was issued for his arrest. He visited many places, mobilizing public opinion in favour of the Kashmir agitation. After Mahatma Gandhi's visit to Kashmir in August 1947 the warrant against him was withdrawn and he returned home after seventeen months.

== Politics ==
On 30 October 1947, Sheikh Mohammed Abdullah was appointed as the Head of Emergency Administration, while Kashmir was under attack from Pakistani raiders. Bakshi Ghulam Mohammad became his deputy head. In March 1948, the administration was upgraded to a popular interim government. Bakshi was entrusted with the Home portfolio. After the constituency assembly election in 1951, Abdullah was elected prime minister of the state and Bakshi appointed as the deputy prime minister.

=== Prime minister (1953–1964) ===
In August 1953, Sheikh Mohammed Abdullah was dismissed and arrested, and Bakshi Ghulam Mohammad became prime minister of the state, winning unanimous a vote of confidence at the beginning of October, and also president of the National Conference by majority vote of the State Cabinet. The famous Kashmir Conspiracy Case against Abdullah and others was started during his tenure.

Bakshi Ghulam Mohammad was an administrator and remembered as the "Architect of Modern Kashmir" because of his work in the state. He set Kashmir on the road to progress, gave a practical shape to the ideal of "Naya Kashmir", and earned fame and goodwill at home and outside Kashmir. He established a direct rapport with people at grass-root level land that gained tremendous popularity among people of all regions.

On the political front, Bakshi Ghulam Mohammad had to face a stiff challenge from the Plebiscite Front which was formed by the loyalists of Sheikh Abdullah in 1955.

In May 1963, after the loss of three Parliamentary by-elections, the Congress party, under the Kamaraj plan, decided that some ministers should resign and give all their time to party work. The final selection was left to Jawaharlal Nehru. Many central ministers resigned in Delhi and Nehru also suggested that Bakshi resign in Jammu and Kashmir. Upon Bakshi's recommendation, Khwaja Shamsuddin, a Bakshi loyalist, was appointed to succeed him. But Shamsuddin headed the state only for a very brief period.

The eleven years of the Bakshi's tenure have been the longest continuous stint by any prime minister or chief minister and are generally acknowledged as a period of stability in the state's post-independence history. Bakshi Ghulam Mohammad had steadfastly resisted any attempt to undermine Jammu and Kashmir's special status within the Union of India.

=== In the opposition (1964–1965) ===
In 1964 Bakshi Ghulam Mohammad headed the opposition to the government of Chief Minister Ghulam Mohammed Sadiq. In the late summer of the same year the majority of the legislators compelled him to move a vote of no-confidence against the government but he was arrested and detained under the Defence of India Rules despite the support of the majority of MLA's in the State Assembly which was prorogued by the governor. Bakshi Ghulam Mohammad was released on health grounds in December. In June 1965 he made an announcement that he had decided to retire from politics.

=== Indian Parliament (1967–1971) ===
In 1967 Indian general election Bakshi was elected to the Lok Sabha from Srinagar Lok Sabha constituency on a National Conference ticket defeating the ruling Congress nominee, Ali Mohammed Tariq, by a large margin. He remained a member of the Lok Sabha till 1971.

== Death ==
Bakshi Ghulam Mohammad died on 9 July 1972.

== Bibliography ==
- Das Gupta, Jyoti Bhusan (1968), Jammu and Kashmir, Springer, ISBN 978-94-011-9231-6
- Kanjwal, Hafsa (2017), Building a New Kashmir: Bakshi Ghulam Muhammad and the Politics of State-Formation in a Disputed Territory (1953-1963) (Thesis), The University of Michigan, hdl:2027.42/138699
- Hussain, Shahla (2021), Kashmir in the Aftermath of the Partition, Cambridge University Press, ISBN 9781108901130
- Puri, Balraj (2015), "Jammu and Kashmir", in Myron Wiener (ed.), State Politics in India, Princeton University Press, pp. 215–246, ISBN 978-1-4008-7914-4
- Wani, Aijaz Ashraf (2019), What Happened to Governance in Kashmir?, Oxford University Press India, ISBN 978-0-19-909715-9

Political offices
Preceded by Sheikh Abdullah	Prime Minister of Jammu and Kashmir; 1953 – 1963	Succeeded by Khwaja Shamsuddin
