= Chief Minister of Jammu and Kashmir =

Leader of the executive branch of Government of Jammu and Kashmir

- Emblem of Jammu and Kashmir

- Flag of India

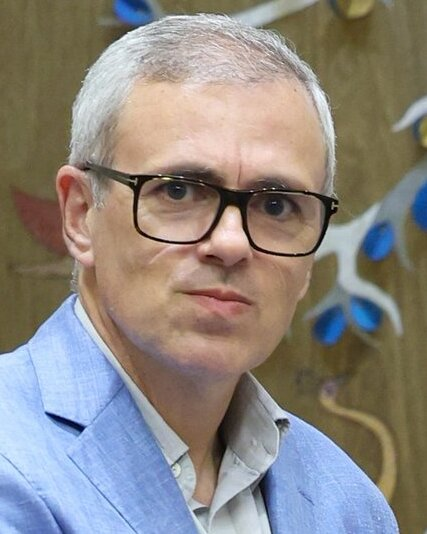
- Incumbent; Omar Abdullah since 16 October 2024
- Chief Minister's Office; Government of Jammu and Kashmir
- Style: Wazir-e-Ala (in Jammu Kashmir); The Honourable (formal); Mr. Chief Minister (informal)
- Type: Head of government
- Status: Leader of the Executive
- Abbreviation: CMoJK
- Member of: State Cabinet; Legislative Assembly
- Reports to: Lieutenant Governor of Jammu and Kashmir; Jammu and Kashmir Legislative Assembly
- Residence: 40, Gupkar Road, Srinagar
- Seat: Civil Secretariat, Old Heritage City, Srinagar
- Nominator: MLAs of the majority party or alliance
- Appointer: Lieutenant Governor of Jammu and Kashmir; by convention based on appointees ability to command confidence in the Jammu and Kashmir Legislative Assembly
- Term length: At the confidence of the assembly; Chief minister's term is for five years and is subject to no term limits.
- Inaugural holder: Ghulam Mohammed Sadiq
- Formation: 30 March 1965 (61 years ago)
- Deputy: Deputy Chief Minister of Jammu and Kashmir
- Salary: ₹140,000 (US$1,500)/monthly; ₹1,680,000 (US$18,000)/annually
- Website: Official website

The chief minister of Jammu and Kashmir is the head of government of Jammu and Kashmir, India. As per the Constitution of India, the lieutenant governor is the union territory's de jure head, but de facto executive authority rests with the chief minister. Following elections to the Jammu and Kashmir Legislative Assembly, the lieutenant governor usually invites the party (or coalition) with a majority of seats to form the government. The lieutenant governor appoints the chief minister, whose council of ministers are collectively responsible to the assembly. Chief Minister also serves as Leader of the House in the Legislative Assembly.

The post was established after the 6th amendment to the state's constitution (effective 6 June 1965) abolished the title of Prime Minister of Jammu and Kashmir. Subsequently, the then prime minister, Ghulam Mohammed Sadiq, was sworn in as the first chief minister of Jammu and Kashmir. The State of Jammu and Kashmir was bifurcated and reorganised as a union territory on 31 October 2019.

The office of the chief minister became vacant on 20 June 2018. Until 19 December 2018, the state was under governor's rule, and then under president's rule until 30 October 2019. After the state was reorganised into a union territory in October 2019, the president's rule was discharged via the lieutenant governor. The lieutenant governor served as the head of government of the union territory of Jammu and Kashmir until a new chief minister was in place following the 2024 Jammu and Kashmir Legislative Assembly election.

== Oath as chief minister ==
The following is the oath of the chief minister:

I, <Name of Chief Minister>, do swear in the name of God/solemnly affirm that I will bear true faith and allegiance to the Constitution of India as by law established, that I will uphold the sovereignty and integrity of India, that I will faithfully and conscientiously discharge my duties as a Minister for the State of () and that I will do right to all manner of people in accordance with the Constitution and the law without fear or favour, affection or ill-will.

== Predecessors ==
=== Prime ministers of the Princely State of Jammu and Kashmir (1917–1947) ===
#	Name	Took office	Left office
1	Raja Sir Daljit Singh	1917	1921
2	Raja Hari Singh	1925	1927
3	Sir Albion Banerjee	January 1927	March 1929
4	G. E. C. Wakefield	1929	1931
5	Hari Krishan Kaul	1931	1932
6	Elliot James Dowell Colvin	1932	1936
7	Sir Barjor J. Dalal	1936	1936
8	Sir N. Gopalaswami Ayyangar	1937	July 1943
9	Kailash Narain Haksar	July 1943	February 1944
10	Sir B. N. Rau	February 1944	28 June 1945
11	Ram Chandra Kak	28 June 1945	11 August 1947
12	Janak Singh	11 August 1947	15 October 1947
13	Mehr Chand Mahajan	15 October 1947	27 October 1947

=== Prime ministers of the State of Jammu and Kashmir (1947–1965) ===
Colour key for parties

Indian National Congress
National Conference
Independent

# (Note: A parenthetical number indicates that the incumbent has previously held office.)	Portrait	Name	Constituency	Tenure			Assembly	Appointer	Party (Note: This column only names the chief minister's party. The state government he headed may have been a complex coalition of several parties and independents; these are not listed here.)
#	Portrait	Name	Constituency	From	To	Days in office	Assembly	Appointer	Party
1		Mehr Chand Mahajan	–	27 October 1947	5 March 1948	130 days	Interim Government	Hari Singh (Maharaja)	Independent
2		Sheikh Abdullah	–	5 March 1948	31 October 1951	5 years, 157 days	Interim Government	Hari Singh (Maharaja)	National Conference
2		Sheikh Abdullah	–	31 October 1951	9 August 1953	5 years, 157 days	1st (1951 election)	Hari Singh (Maharaja)	National Conference
3		Bakshi Ghulam Mohammad	Safa Kadal	9 August 1953	25 March 1957	10 years, 125 days	1st (1951 election)	Karan Singh (Sadr-e-Riyasat)	National Conference
3		Bakshi Ghulam Mohammad	Safa Kadal	25 March 1957	18 February 1962	10 years, 125 days	2nd (1957 election)	Karan Singh (Sadr-e-Riyasat)	National Conference
3		Bakshi Ghulam Mohammad	Safa Kadal	18 February 1962	12 October 1963	10 years, 125 days	3rd (1962 election)	Karan Singh (Sadr-e-Riyasat)	National Conference
4		Khwaja Shamsuddin	Anantnag	12 October 1963	29 February 1964	140 days	3rd (1962 election)	Karan Singh (Sadr-e-Riyasat)	National Conference
5		Ghulam Mohammed Sadiq	Tankipura	29 February 1964	30 March 1965	1 year, 30 days	3rd (1962 election)	Karan Singh (Sadr-e-Riyasat)	Indian National Congress

== Chief Ministers of Jammu and Kashmir (1965–present) ==
# (Note: A parenthetical number indicates that the incumbent has previously held office.)	Portrait	Name (Birth-Death)	Constituency	Tenure			Assembly	Party (Note: This columnister's party. The state government he headed may have been a complex coalition of several parties and independents; these are not listed here.)
#	Portrait	Name (Birth-Death)	Constituency	From	To	Days in office	Assembly	Party
State of Jammu and Kashmir (1947–2019)
1		Ghulam Mohammed Sadiq (1912–1971)	Tankipora	30 March 1965	21 February 1967	6 years, 257 days	3rd (1962 election)	Indian National Congress
1		Ghulam Mohammed Sadiq (1912–1971)	Amira Kadal	21 February 1967	12 December 1971	6 years, 257 days	4th (1967 election)	Indian National Congress
2		Syed Mir Qasim (1921–2004)	Verinag	12 December 1971	17 June 1972	3 years, 75 days	4th (1967 election)	Indian National Congress
2		Syed Mir Qasim (1921–2004)	Verinag	17 June 1972	25 February 1975	3 years, 75 days	5th (1972 election)	Indian National Congress
3		Sheikh Abdullah (1905–1982)	MLC	25 February 1975	26 March 1977	2 years, 29 days	5th (1972 election)	National Conference
–		Vacant (Governor's rule)	N/A	26 March 1977	9 July 1977	105 days	Dissolved	N/A
(3)		Sheikh Abdullah (1905–1982)	Ganderbal	9 July 1977	8 September 1982	5 years, 61 days	6th (1977 election)	National Conference
4		Farooq Abdullah (born 1937)	Ganderbal	8 September 1982	24 November 1983	1 year, 298 days	6th (1977 election)	National Conference
4		Farooq Abdullah (born 1937)	Ganderbal	24 November 1983	2 July 1984	1 year, 298 days	7th (1983 election)	National Conference
5		Ghulam Mohammad Shah (1920–2009)	MLC	2 July 1984	6 March 1986	1 year, 247 days	7th (1983 election)	Awami National Conference
–		Vacant (Governor's rule)	N/A	6 March 1986	5 September 1986	183 days	7th (1983 election)	N/A
–		Vacant (President's rule)	N/A	6 September 1986	7 November 1986	62 days	7th (1983 election)	N/A
(4)		Farooq Abdullah (born 1937)	Ganderbal	7 November 1986	23 March 1987	3 years, 73 days	7th (1983 election)	National Conference
(4)		Farooq Abdullah (born 1937)	Ganderbal	23 March 1987	19 January 1990	3 years, 73 days	8th (1987 election)	National Conference
–		Vacant (Governor's rule)	N/A	19 January 1990	18 July 1990	180 days	Dissolved	N/A
–		Vacant (President's rule)	N/A	19 July 1990	9 October 1996	6 years, 82 days	Dissolved	N/A
(4)		Farooq Abdullah (born 1937)	Ganderbal	9 October 1996	18 October 2002	6 years, 9 days	9th (1996 election)	National Conference
-		Vacant (Governor's rule)	N/A	18 October 2002	2 November 2002	15 days	10th (2002 election)	N/A
6		Mufti Mohammad Sayeed (1936–2016)	Pahalgam	2 November 2002	2 November 2005	3 years, 0 days	10th (2002 election)	People's Democratic Party
7		Ghulam Nabi Azad (born 1949)	Bhaderwah	2 November 2005	11 July 2008	2 years, 252 days	10th (2002 election)	Indian National Congress
–		Vacant (Governor's rule)	N/A	11 July 2008	5 January 2009	178 days	Dissolved	N/A
8		Omar Abdullah (born 1970)	Ganderbal	5 January 2009	8 January 2015	6 years, 3 days	11th (2008 election)	National Conference
–		Vacant (Governor's rule)	N/A	8 January 2015	1 March 2015	52 days	12th (2014 election)	N/A
(6)		Mufti Mohammad Sayeed (1936–2016)	Anantnag	1 March 2015	7 January 2016	312 days	12th (2014 election)	People's Democratic Party
–		Vacant (Governor's rule)	N/A	7 January 2016	4 April 2016	88 days	12th (2014 election)	N/A
9		Mehbooba Mufti (born 1959)	Anantnag	4 April 2016	19 June 2018	2 years, 76 days	12th (2014 election)	People's Democratic Party
–		Vacant (Governor's rule)	N/A	20 June 2018	19 December 2018	182 days	Dissolved	N/A
–		Vacant (President's rule)	N/A	20 December 2018	30 October 2019	314 days	Dissolved	N/A
Union territory of Jammu and Kashmir (2019–present) (Note: Following the abrogation of Article 370 and the enactment of the Jammu and Kashmir Reorganisation Act, 2019, the former state of Jammu and Kashmir was reorganised into the union territories of Jammu and Kashmir and Ladakh on 31 October 2019. The office of chief minister remained vacant until the formation of an elected government in October 2024.)
–		Vacant (President's rule)	N/A	(Note: After Jammu and Kashmir Reorganization Act, 2019) 31 October 2019	14 October 2024	4 years, 349 days	Dissolved	N/A
1 (UT)		Omar Abdullah (born 1970)	Ganderbal	16 October 2024	Incumbent	2 years, 37 days	1st (UT) (2024 election)	National Conference

== Statistics ==
=== Prime Minister/Chief Minister of State/Union Territory of Jammu and Kashmir ===
#	Prime/Chief Minister	Party	No. of terms	Term of office	
#	Prime/Chief Minister	Party	No. of terms	Longest continuous term	Total duration of prime/chief ministership
1	Sheikh Abdullah	JKNC	4	5 years, 157 days	12 years, 247 days
2	Farooq Abdullah	JKNC	5	6 years, 9 days	11 years, 15 days
3	Bakshi Ghulam Mohammad	JKNC	3	10 years, 125 days	10 years, 125 days
4	Omar Abdullah*	JKNC	2*	6 years, 3 days*	8 years, 39 days*
5	Ghulam Mohammed Sadiq	INC	3	6 years, 257 days	7 years, 287 days
6	Mufti Mohammad Sayeed	JKPDP	2	3 years, 0 days	3 years, 312 days
7	Syed Mir Qasim	INC	2	3 years, 75 days	3 years, 75 days
8	Ghulam Nabi Azad	INC	1	2 years, 252 days	2 years, 252 days
9	Mehbooba Mufti	JKPDP	1	2 years, 77 days	2 years, 77 days
10	Ghulam Mohammad Shah	JKANC	1	1 year, 247 days	1 year, 247 days
11	Mehr Chand Mahajan	IND	1	142 days	142 days
12	Khwaja Shamsuddin	JKNC	1	140 days	140 days
–	President's rule / Governor's rule	N/A	12	6 years, 82 days	14 years, 330 days

== See also ==
- Deputy Chief Minister of Jammu and Kashmir
- Government of Jammu and Kashmir
