= Tariq Hameed Karra =

Indian politician

Tariq Hamid Karra

President Jammu and Kashmir Congress Committee
- Incumbent
- Assumed office 16 August 2024
- Preceded by: Vikar Rasool Wani

Member of Jammu and Kashmir Legislative Assembly
- Incumbent
- Assumed office 8 October 2024
- Preceded by: Noor Mohd
- Constituency: Central Shalteng

Member of Parliament Lok Sabha
- In office 16 May 2014 – 17 November 2016
- Preceded by: Farooq Abdullah
- Succeeded by: Farooq Abdullah
- Constituency: Srinagar

Cabinet Minister of Finance, Planning & Development, Law, Parliamentary Affairs, Housing & Urban Development, Forest, Environment, Ecology Tourism Government of Jammu and Kashmir
- In office 2005–2008

Personal details
- Born: 28 June 1955 (age 71) Batamaloo, Srinagar, Jammu and Kashmir, India
- Party: Indian National Congress (2017-present)
- Other political affiliations: Jammu and Kashmir Peoples Democratic Party (1999-2017)
- Spouse: Smt. Asifa Tariq Karra (m. 1980)
- Children: 2 (1 Son and 1 Daughter)
- Profession: Politician

Tariq Hameed Karra (born 28 June 1955) is an Indian politician from Jammu and Kashmir and was a member of parliament to the 16th Lok Sabha from Srinagar. He is currently serving as the President of Jammu Kashmir PCC. He is also a Member of the Legislative Assembly from the Central Shalteng constituency.

== Political Career ==
He had won the 2014 Indian general election being a Jammu & Kashmir Peoples Democratic Party candidate by defeating Dr. Farooq Abdullah of National Conference by more than 40,000 votes, and thereby handing the veteran politician his first ever electoral defeat in 4 decades. He was a fierce critic of the BJP-PDP alliance from the very beginning and resigned from the Lok Sabha and PDP, of which he was a founding member as a mark of protest against innocent civilian killings in September 2016 and later joined the Indian National Congress in February 2017 and was later nominated as a member of the Congress Working Committee, the first for any politician from the Kashmir valley. He has also served as the Finance, Planning and Law Minister for Jammu and Kashmir state. Currently, he is serving as JKPCC president and Member of Legislative assembly of Central Shalteng Assembly constituency.

Lok Sabha
Preceded by Farooq Abdullah	Member of Parliament for Srinagar; 2014 – 2017	Succeeded by Farooq Abdullah
