= Caput Mundi =

Latin expression

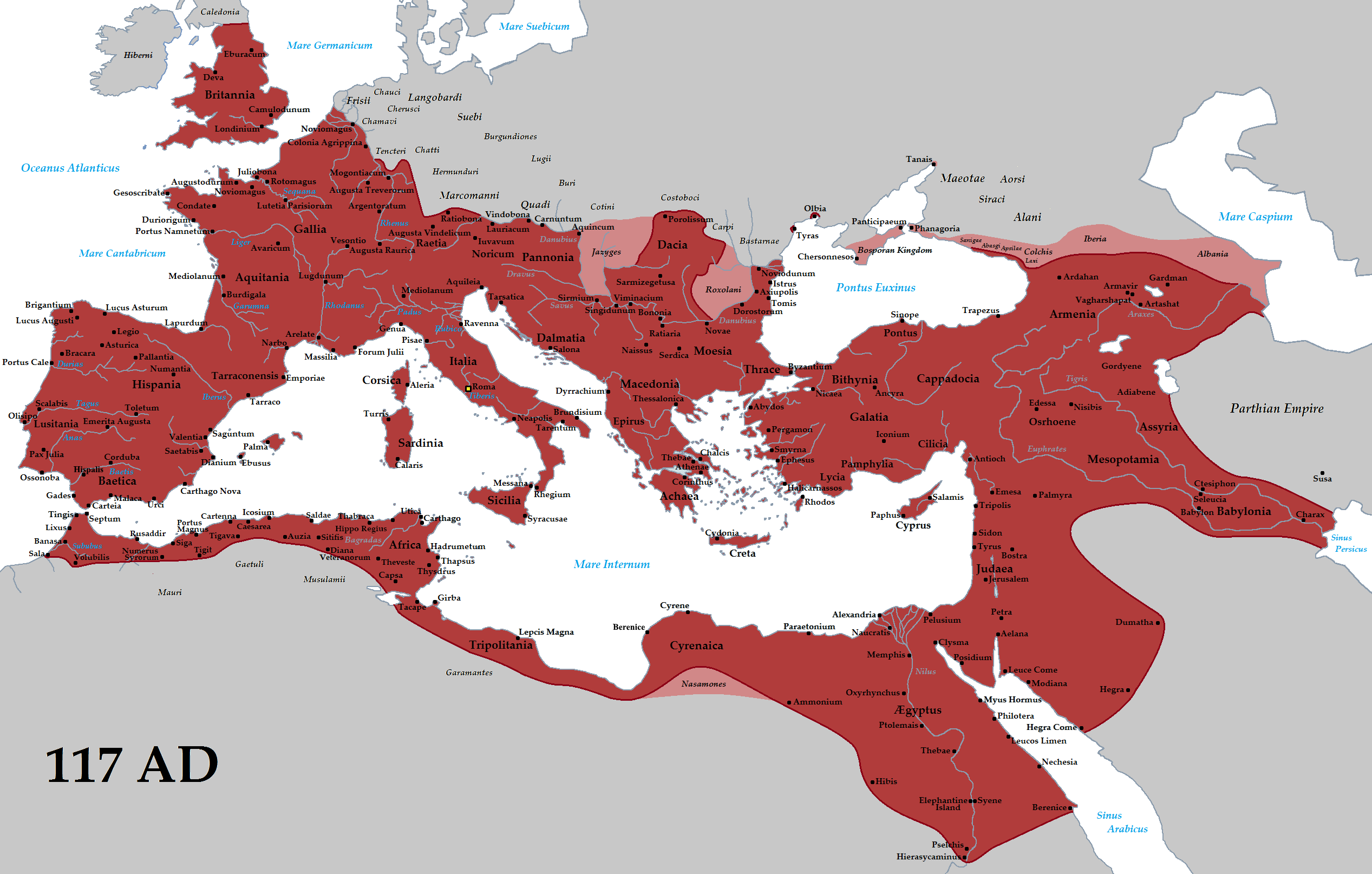
Map of Rome, the imperial capital at the height of its territorial expansion

Caput Mundi is a Latin phrase which literally means "Head of the World" (whereas Roma Caput Mundi means "Rome capital of the world") and is one of the many nicknames given to the city of Rome throughout its history. The phrase is related to the enduring power of the city first as the capital of the Republic and the Empire, and later as the centre of the Catholic Church.

Although it is not known for sure when it was first used, Rome was already named in this way by the poet Ovid in the 1st century BC. Along with "Eternal City" and the "City of Seven Hills", Caput Mundi remains one of the most commonly used names to refer to the city of Rome.

== Meaning ==
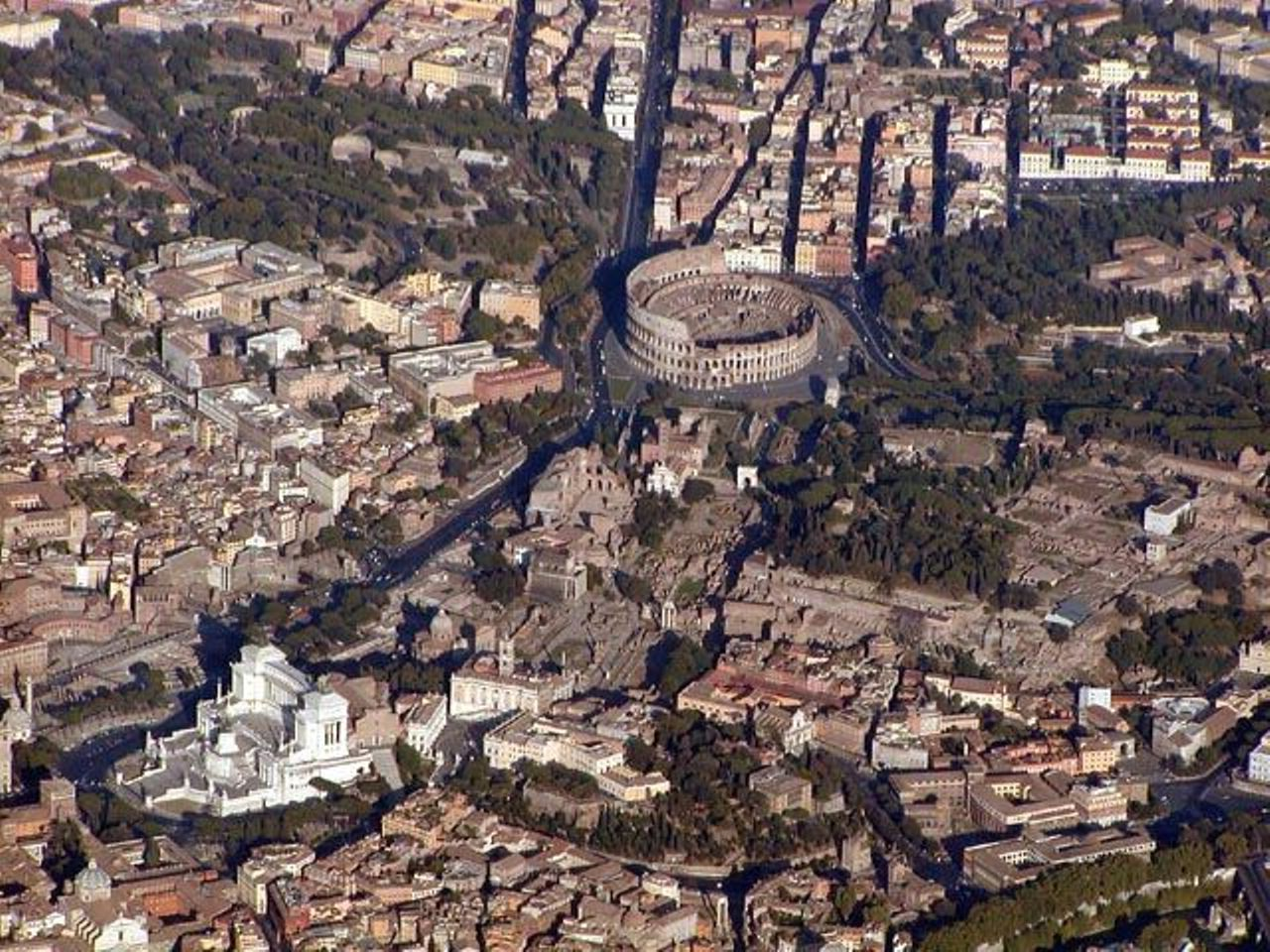
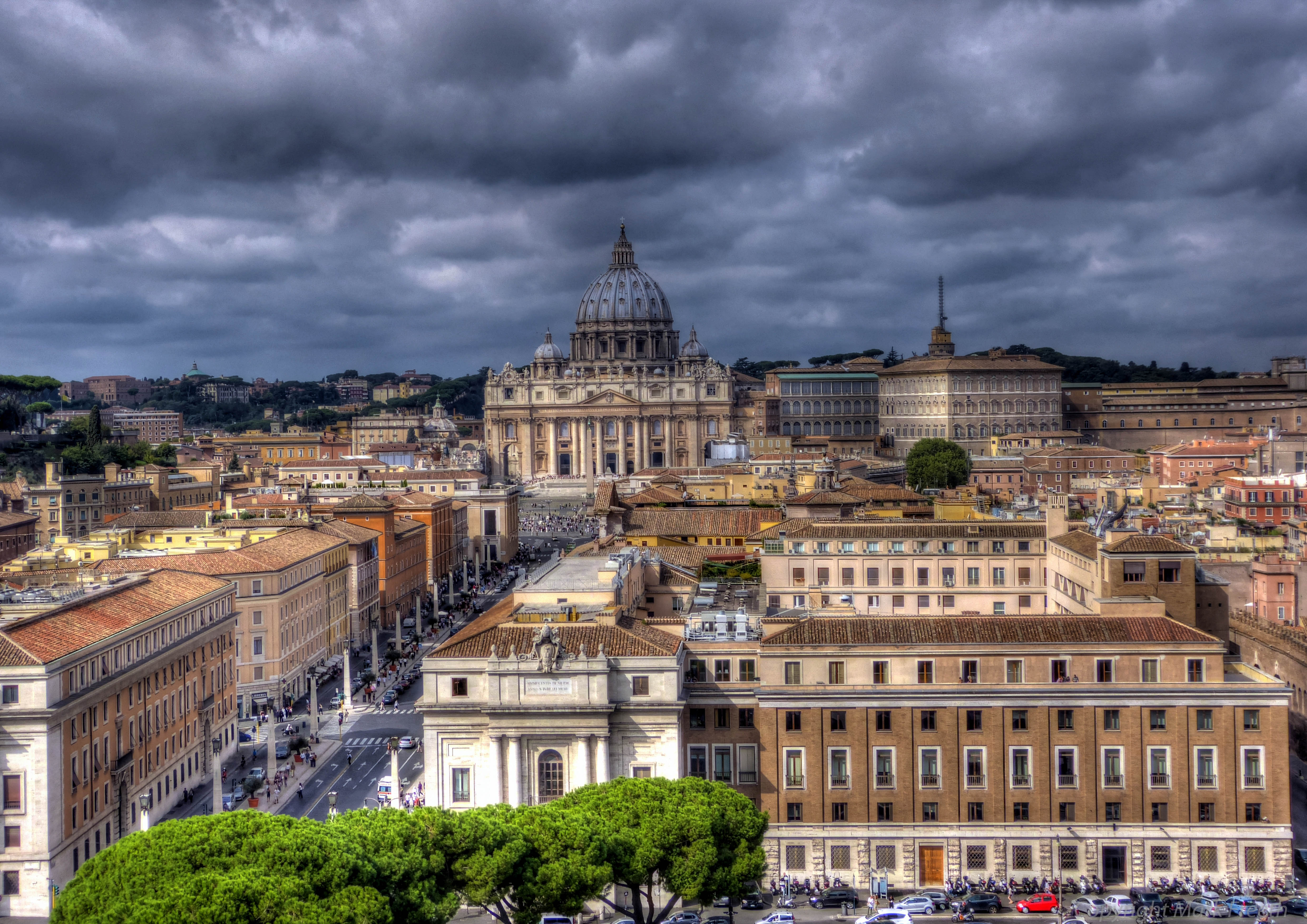
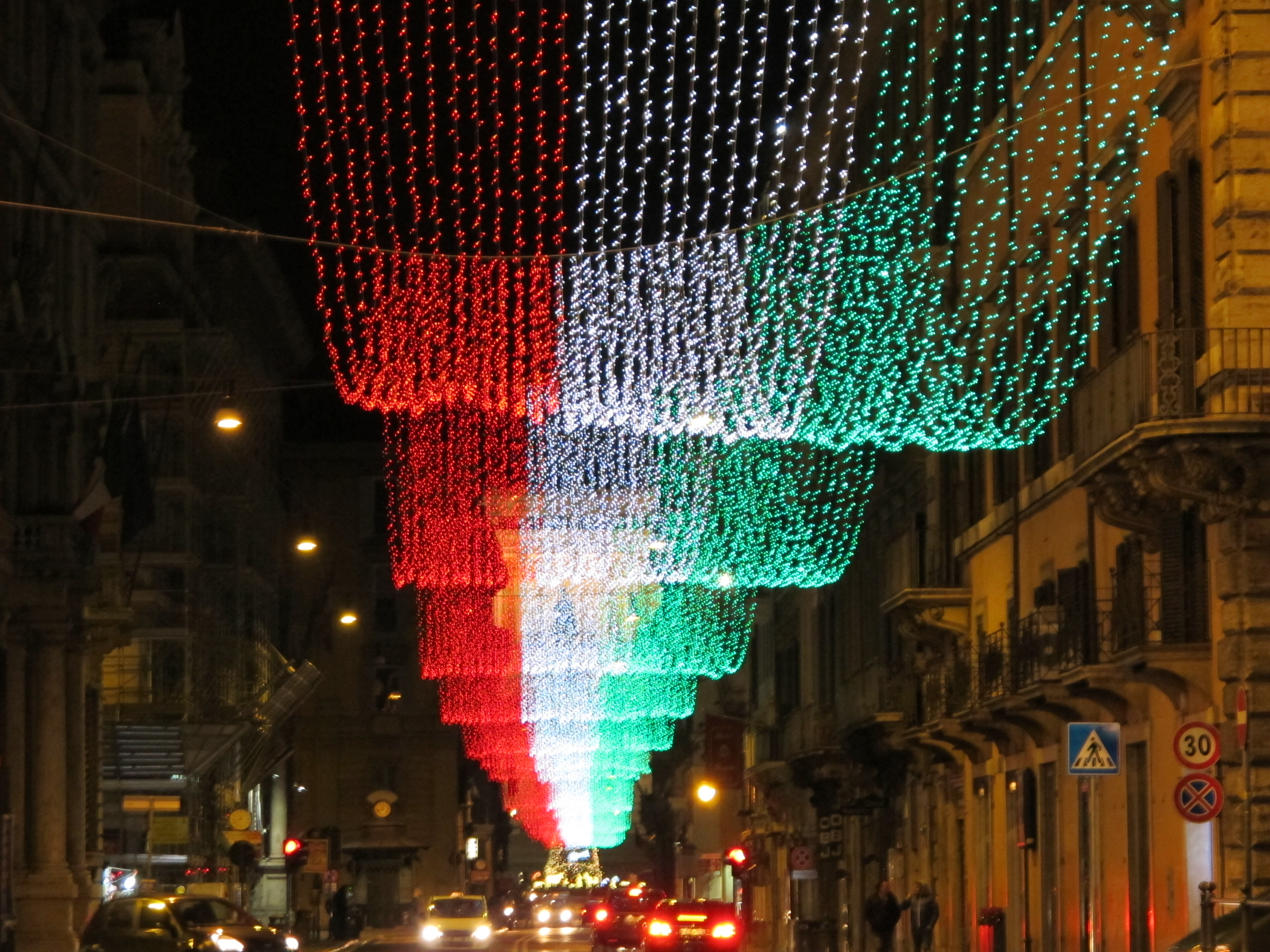
Via dei Fori Imperiali, Via della Conciliazione and Via del Corso

Roma Caput Mundi is a Latin phrase taken to mean "Rome capital of the world" and "Roma capitale del mondo" in Italian (literally: "head of the world"). It originates out of a classical European understanding of the known world: Europe, North Africa, and Southwest Asia. The influence of Rome in the ancient world began to grow around the 2nd century BC as the Republic expanded across Southern Europe and North Africa. For the next five centuries, Rome governed much of the known world (of traditional Greco-Roman geography) and served as the world's largest city during that period. The cultural influence of the local language of Rome (Latin) as well as Roman art, architecture, law, religion, and philosophy was significant. The Imperial city of Rome adopted as its nickname Caput Mundi, attributing this to its perception of an enduring power of Ancient Rome and the Catholic Church.

The Italian patriot and democratic thinker Giuseppe Mazzini spoke of three ages of Rome: First Rome referring to the "Rome of the Emperors", Second Rome referring to the "Rome of the Popes", and the Third Rome referring to the "Rome of the people".

== See also ==
- Legacy of the Roman Empire
- Welthauptstadt Germania
