= G. E. C. Wakefield =

Anglo-Indian civil servant and Prime Minister of Jammu and Kashmir

George Edward Campbell Wakefield CIE OBE (16 April 1873 – 9 March 1944) was an Anglo-Indian civil servant who served as Prime Minister of Jammu and Kashmir between 1929 and 1931.

== Biography ==
Wakefield was born in Multan, Bengal, British India to George Edward Wakefield and his second wife, Adelaide ("Ada") Ruth Mary Allsop. His paternal grandmother was Indian or Bengali and converted to Christianity, taking the name Maria Suffolk.

He joined the British Indian Civil Service and served as an Assistant Engineer in the Irrigation Department of Punjab from 1892; held various posts in Udaipur from 1903 to 1909; served in the government of the Nizam of Hyderabad from 1910 to 1921 as irrigation settlement officer, deputy Director General of Revenue, as director general of Commerce and Industries and then as personal secretary to the Nizam. Wakefield was awarded the Kaisar-i-Hind Medal of the British Raj for public service in India in 1901.

From 1921 Wakefield served in the government of Jammu and Kashmir and was Prime Minister between 1929 and 1931. He was replaced by Hari Kishan Kaul under controversial circumstances.

In 1931, nearing retirement, Wakefield established a citrus orchard at Khanpur, Rawalpindi, importing plants from Florida, California, South Africa and Australia. In December 2016 the orchard was being advertised as a prestige development under the name "Wakefield Gardens".

In 1942 he published a memoir, Recollections : 50 years in the service of India (Lahore: Civil and Military Gazette).

He died in Rawalpindi, aged 70.

== Honours ==
Wakefield was appointed an Officer of the Order of the British Empire (OBE) in the 1918 Birthday Honours, being described in the London Gazette when he was Director-General of Revenue, His Exalted Highness the Nizam's Government, Hyderabad, Deccan. He was appointed a Companion of the Order of the Indian Empire (CIE) in the 1928 Birthday Honours, when he was described as Police and Public Works Minister, Jammu and Kashmir State.
