= Flag of Jammu and Kashmir =

Flag of India-controlled Jammu and Kashmir (1956–2019)

State flag of Jammu and Kashmir
- Use: State flag
- Proportion: 2:3
- Adopted: 7 June 1952
- Relinquished: 31 October 2019
- Design: A red-and-white flag with a representation of a plough and three constituent regions of the state.

The state flag of Jammu and Kashmir was a symbol used in the former Indian state of Jammu and Kashmir, between 1952 and 2019, under the special status accorded to the region by Article 370 of the Constitution of India. It was a red-and-white flag with a representation of a plough and three constituent regions of the state. After the abolition of Article 370 in August 2019, this flag lost its official status.

== History ==
=== Origins ===
Article 144 of the Constitution of Jammu and Kashmir, stated that the flag of the state shall be rectangular 3:2 format. Its colour is red, which originally came to symbolise workers and labourers. In the middle, a white plough further symbolises the peasants. Next to the staff, three vertical white stripes represent the three regions of Jammu, Kashmir and Ladakh.

The flag had its origin in events that took place on 13 July 1931 in Srinagar. On the day, Kashmiri Muslims were protesting outside the Srinagar Central Jail premises at Srinagar where Abdul Qadeer was arrested on the charge of terrorism and inciting public against the Maharaja of Jammu and Kashmir by Dogra state forces. The blood-tainted shirt of one of the victims was then hoisted by the crowd as the new flag of Kashmir.

On 11 July 1939, the older version flag was adopted by the Jammu & Kashmir National Conference, a political party. On 7 June 1952, a resolution was passed by the Constituent Assembly of Jammu and Kashmir, making it the official state flag.

=== 2015 controversy ===
The Constitution of Jammu and Kashmir, in force until August 2019, made it mandatory to hoist the state flag alongside the Flag of India. In 2015, the newly elected Bharatiya Janata Party members in the Jammu and Kashmir Legislative Assembly refused to hoist the state flag in their offices. BJP Ministers did not hoist the state flag either, as they consider that it is of no importance.

The government led by Chief Minister Mufti Mohammad Sayeed then issued a circular making it compulsory to hoist the state flag along with the national flag, stating that "The state flag has the same sanctity and position as the national flag has under the Indian Constitution and other statutory provisions." However, within 20 hours, the state government withdrew this circular. On withdrawal of the circular, the Jammu & Kashmir BJP spokesperson said, ""Our leaders cannot have any other flag on their vehicles besides the Tricolour. We welcome the withdrawal of the circular."

In December 2015, the Jammu and Kashmir High Court ordered the government of the state to hoist the state flag along with the national flag on official buildings and vehicles of constitutional authorities. However, this decision was contested by the Bharatiya Janata Party and in January 2016 Jammu and Kashmir High Court stayed their decision. Deputy Chief Minister of Jammu and Kashmir Nirmal Kumar Singh said that no flag could be hoisted at an equal level of the national flag of India. Other parties alleged that the BJP is trying to impose its nationalist agenda on a state with special status. Despite the stance of the BJP, ministers of its coalition partner PDP continue to use the state flag alongside the national flag in official meetings. The youth wing of the National Conference also launched a campaign encouraging people to use the state flag as the profile image on their social media accounts saying that "the state flag of Jammu and Kashmir doesn't undermine or take away the protocol or status of the national flag and is clearly provided for in our constitution."

=== Abolition ===
The flag lost its official status on 6 August 2019 following the removal of the region's special status through the abrogation of Article 370 of the Constitution of India and was lowered for the last time on 25 August 2019.

The state of Jammu and Kashmir was dissolved on 31 October 2019 and it was divided into two "union territories," Jammu and Kashmir and Ladakh.

== Gallery ==
1846–1936

1936–1952

1952–2019

== See also ==
- Emblem of Jammu and Kashmir
- Constitution of Jammu and Kashmir
- Flag of Azad Kashmir
- National flag of India
- List of Indian state flags
- List of Pakistani flags
