= Jammu and Kashmir (state) =

State administered by India (1952–2019)

- Former State of India
- 1947–2019
- Flag Emblem

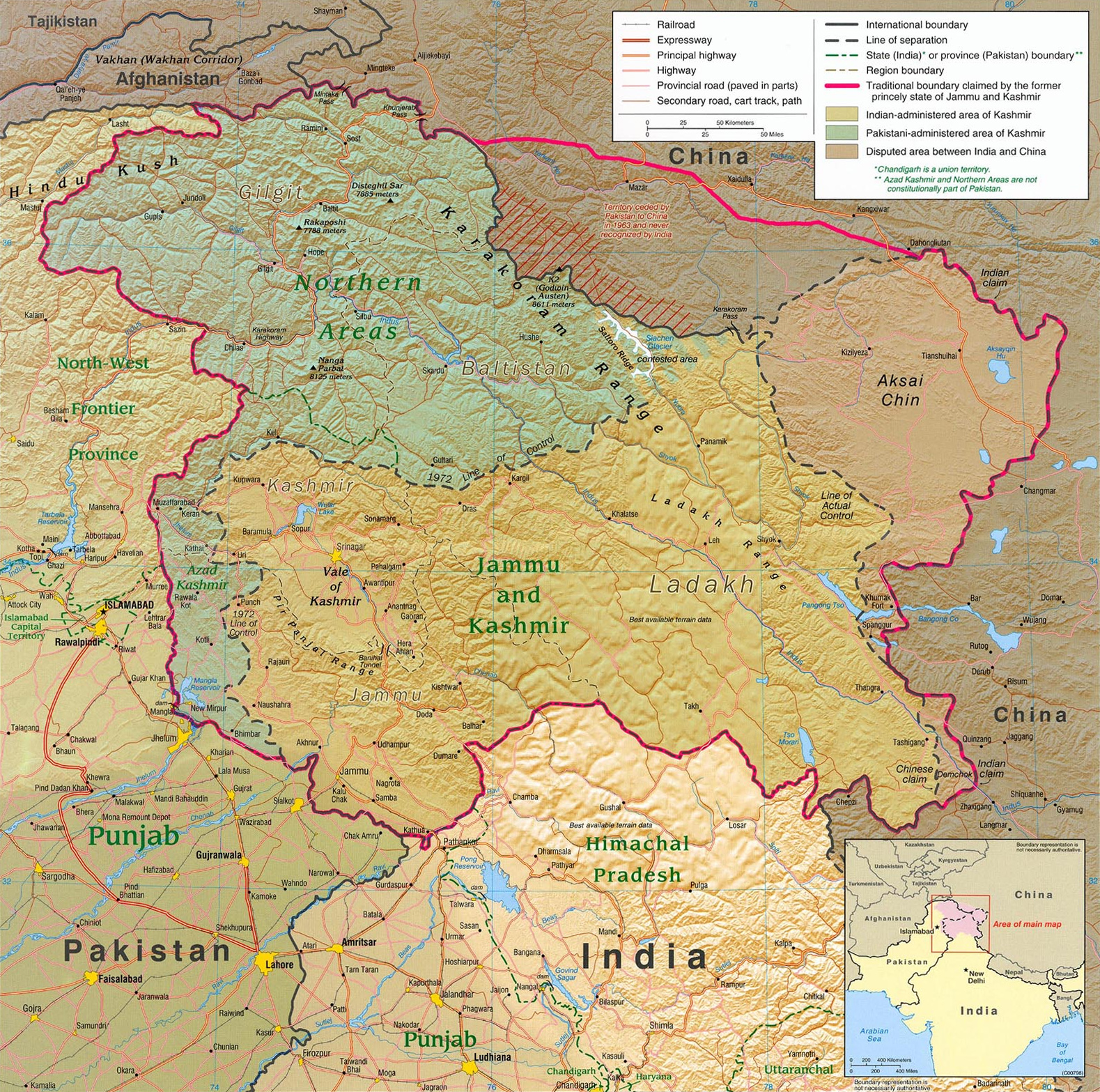
- Map of Jammu and Kashmir
- Capital: Srinagar (May–October); Jammu (November–April) (Note: Government offices were shifted twice a year.)
- Area
  - Total (Note: Jammu and Kashmir is a disputed territory between India, Pakistan and China. The areas of Azad Kashmir and Gilgit-Baltistan administered by Pakistan and Aksai Chin region administered by China are included in the total area.): 222,236 km^{2} (85,806 sq mi)
- Government
- Governor
  - 1947–1952 as Regent; 1952–1965 as Sadar-i-Riyasat; 1965–1967: Karan Singh (first)
  - 2018–2019: Satya Pal Malik (last)
- Chief Minister
  - 27–30 October 1947 as Prime Minister: Mehr Chand Mahajan (first)
  - 2016–2018: Mehbooba Mufti (last)
- Legislature: Jammu and Kashmir Legislature
  - Upper house: Jammu and Kashmir Legislative Council (36 seats)
  - Lower house: Jammu and Kashmir Legislative Assembly (89 seats)
- History
  - Foundation of Jammu and Kashmir: 16 March 1846
  - Accession to the Indian Union as a state: 27 October 1947
  - End of First Kashmir War (cession of Azad Kashmir and Gilgit-Baltistan): 1 January 1949
  - Article 370 drafted in the Indian Constitution, providing autonomy to the state: 17 October 1949
  - Abolition of monarchical titles: 17 November 1952
  - Presidential order of 1954, defining the permanent residents of the state: 14 May 1954
  - Reorganised into Jammu and Kashmir and Ladakh: 31 October 2019
- Political subdivisions: 22 districts
Preceded by	Succeeded by
Jammu and Kashmir (princely state)	Jammu and Kashmir (union territory); Ladakh

Jammu (Note: Pronounced variably as /ˈdʒæmuː/ JAM-oo or /ˈdʒʌmuː/ JUM-oo.) and Kashmir (Note: Pronounced variably as /ˈkæʃmɪər/ KASH-meer or /kæʃˈmɪər/ kash-MEER.) was a region formerly administered by India as a state from 1947 to 2019, constituting the southern and south-eastern portion of the larger Kashmir region, which has been the subject of a dispute between India, Pakistan and China since the mid-20th century. The underlying region of this state were parts of the former princely state of Jammu and Kashmir, whose western districts, now known as Azad Kashmir, and northern territories, now known as Gilgit-Baltistan, are administered by Pakistan. The Aksai Chin region in the east, bordering Tibet, is under Chinese control which it recognises as part of Xinjiang region.

After the Government of India repealed the special status accorded to Jammu and Kashmir under Article 370 of the Indian constitution in 2019, the Parliament of India passed the Jammu and Kashmir Reorganisation Act, which contained provisions to split the state into two union territories – Ladakh in the east and the residuary Jammu and Kashmir in the west, with effect from 31 October 2019. Jammu and Kashmir was the only state in India with a Muslim-majority population.

== Establishment ==
After the Indo-Pakistani War of 1947–1948, the princely state of Jammu and Kashmir was divided between India (which controlled the regions of Jammu, Kashmir Valley, and Ladakh) and Pakistan (which controlled Gilgit–Baltistan and Azad Kashmir). Maharaja Hari Singh signed the Instrument of Accession on 26 October 1947 after an invasion by Pakistani tribesmen. Sheikh Abdullah was appointed as the prime minister of Jammu and Kashmir as part of an emergency government by Maharaja Hari Singh on 30 October 1947. In order to integrate the provisions of the instrument of accession relating to the powers of the state and Indian government, the Constituent Assembly of India drew up the draft provision named Article 306-A, which would later become Article 370.

A constituent assembly for Jammu and Kashmir was convened to frame a new constitution for the state in October 1951, after an election in which all the seats were won by the Jammu & Kashmir National Conference party of Abdullah.

Abdullah reached an agreement termed as the "Delhi Agreement" with Jawaharlal Nehru, the Prime Minister of India, on 24 July 1952. It extended provisions of the Constitution of India regarding citizenship and fundamental rights to the state, in addition to the jurisdiction of the Supreme Court of India. Agreements were also reached on issues of abolishing the monarchy, as well as the state being allowed a separate flag and official language. The Delhi Agreement spelt out the relationship between the central government and the state through recognizing the autonomy of Jammu and Kashmir, while also declaring it as an integral part of India and granting the central government control of several subjects that were not a part of the instrument of accession.

The government of Jammu and Kashmir quickly moved to adopt the provisions of the agreement. The recommendations of the Drafting Committee on the Constitution of Jammu and Kashmir regarding the monarchy were accepted by the Constituent Assembly of Jammu and Kashmir on 21 August 1952. The Jammu and Kashmir Constitution Act 1939 was amended in November 1952 to adopt the resolutions and the monarchy was officially abolished on 12 November. The regent Karan Singh was formally elected as the Sadar-i-Riyasat or head of state by the Constituent Assembly and was later recognized by the President of India. The amendments incorporating the provisions into the state constitution entered into force on 17 November.

=== Integration with India ===
Abdullah however sought to make Article 370 permanent and began calling for the secession of the state from India, which led to his arrest in 1953. Bakshi Ghulam Mohammad then became the Prime Minister of Jammu and Kashmir. The Constituent Assembly of the state passed a resolution in February 1954, extending some provisions of the Constitution of India and formally ratifying the accession of the state to India per the Instrument of Accession. A Presidential Order was passed on 14 May 1954 to implement the Delhi Agreement, drawing its validity from the resolution of the Constituent Assembly.

The new Constitution of Jammu and Kashmir was adopted on 17 November 1956 and came into force on 26 January 1957. Following this, the state constituent assembly dissolved itself and elections were held for the legislative assembly in 1957, with the National Conference winning 68 out of 75 seats.

In 1956–57, China constructed a road through the disputed Aksai Chin area of Ladakh. India's belated discovery of this road culminated in the Sino-Indian War of 1962; China continues to administer Aksai Chin since.

In December 1964, the Indian government extended provisions of Articles 356 and 357 of the Constitution of India, which allowed for President's rule in the state. In April 1965, the legislative assembly approved renaming the positions of Sadar-i-Riyasat to Governor and Wazir-i-Azam (Prime Minister) to Chief Minister of Jammu and Kashmir. Though the change had no actual effect on the legal structure of the state, it conveyed that the government of Jammu and Kashmir was equal to that of any other Indian state.

Despite Nehru releasing the imprisoned Abdullah in April 1964 to initiate dialogue with Pakistan, it viewed these developments as leading to the inseparability of Jammu and Kashmir from India and launched an armed conflict, infiltrating Kashmir during Operation Gibraltar in August 1965. However, it ultimately failed in its objective and both countries returned to the status quo after the Tashkent Declaration of 1966. The government of Ghulam Mohammed Sadiq meanwhile rapidly extended many provisions of the Indian Constitution to further integrate the state into India.

Following the Indo-Pakistani War of 1971, India and Pakistan signed the Simla Agreement, recognising a Line of Control in Kashmir, and committing to a peaceful resolution of the dispute through bilateral negotiations. The failure of Pakistan in the 1971 Indo-Pakistani war weakened the Kashmiri nationalist movement and Abdullah dropped demands of secession. Under the Indira–Sheikh Accord of 1975, he recognised the region as a part of India, the state legislature requiring the approval of the President to make laws, and the Parliament of India being able to promulgate laws against secessionism. In return, Article 370 was left untouched and Abdullah became the Chief Minister of the state. The region remained mostly peaceful until his death in 1982.

== Kashmir insurgency ==
In the late 1980s, discontent over the high-handed policies of the union government and allegations of the rigging of the 1987 Jammu and Kashmir Legislative Assembly election provoked separatist sentiments in the region, culminating in a violent uprising and prolonged armed insurgency backed by Pakistan, who claimed to have given its "moral and diplomatic" support to the movement. Several new militant groups with radical Islamic views emerged and changed the ideological emphasis of the movement to Islamic. This was facilitated by a large influx of Islamic "Jihadi" fighters (mujahideen) who had entered the Kashmir valley following the end of the Soviet–Afghan War in the 1980s. The Inter-Services Intelligence of Pakistan has been accused by India and the international community of supporting, supplying arms and training mujahideen, to fight in Jammu and Kashmir. In 2015, former President of Pakistan Pervez Musharraf admitted that Pakistan had supported and trained insurgent groups in the 1990s. A prolonged, bloody conflict between the Islamic militant separatists and the Indian Army took place, both of whom have been accused of widespread human rights abuses, including abductions, massacres, rapes and armed robbery. (Note: Sources that detail human right abuses in Jammu and Kashmir.)

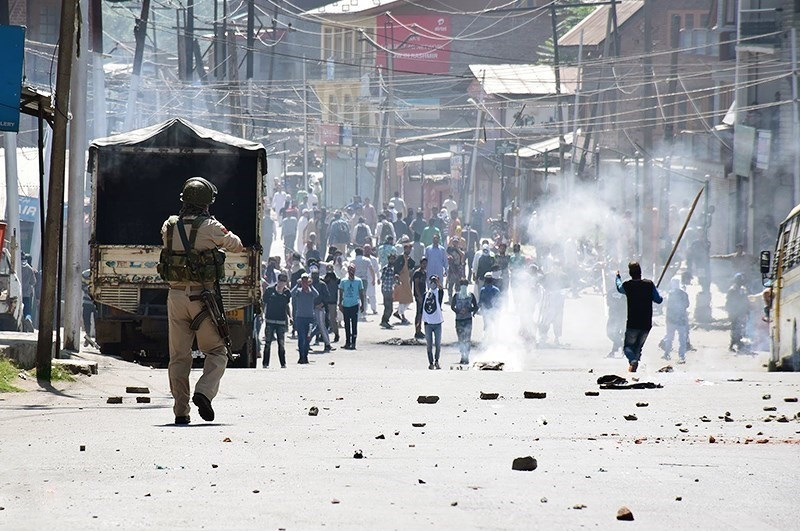
Police and protesters confronting each other in Kashmir, 2018

The violence emerged as a setback to industries in the Valley. Doda district, rich in high-grade sapphire, had active mines until 1989 that were abandoned owing to their turbulent location. In 1998, the government discovered that smugglers had occupied these mines and stolen much of the resource. Following the 2008 Kashmir unrest, secessionist movements in the region were boosted. The 2016–17 Kashmir unrest resulted in the death of over 90 civilians and the injury of over 15,000. Six policemen, including a sub-inspector were killed in an ambush in Anantnag in June 2017, by trespassing militants of the Pakistan-based Lashkar-e-Toiba. An attack on an Indian police convoy in Pulwama, in February 2019, resulted in the deaths of 40 police officers. Responsibility for the attack was claimed by a Pakistan-backed militant group Jaish-e-Mohammed.

== Revocation of special status and reorganisation ==
In August 2019, the Parliament of India passed resolutions to amend Article 370, ending Jammu and Kashmir’s special constitutional status and bringing it entirely under the Constitution of India. Alongside this, the Jammu and Kashmir Reorganisation Act, 2019 was passed, splitting the state of Jammu and Kashmir into two union territories: Ladakh and the residuary Jammu and Kashmir.

Ahead of these actions, the union government locked down the Kashmir Valley, increased security forces, restricted public movement under Section 144, and detained several political leaders, including former chief ministers Omar Abdullah and Mehbooba Mufti. Internet and phone services were also suspended. The new administrative structure came into effect on 31 October 2019.

== Administration ==
=== Administrative divisions ===
The Divisions of Jammu and Kashmir: Kashmir (green), Jammu (orange) and Ladakh (blue)

The state of Jammu and Kashmir consisted of three divisions: the Jammu Division, the Kashmir Division and Ladakh which were further divided into 22 districts. The Siachen Glacier, while under Indian military control, did not lie under the administration of the state of Jammu and Kashmir. Kishtwar, Ramban, Reasi, Samba, Bandipora, Ganderbal, Kulgam and Shopian were districts formed in 2008.

=== Districts ===
Division	Name	Headquarters	Before 2007	After 2007				
Division	Name	Headquarters	Area (km^{2})	Area (km^{2})	Area (sq miles)	Rural Area (km^{2})	Urban Area (km^{2})	Ref.
Jammu	Kathua district	Kathua	2,651	2,502	966	2,458.84	43.16	
Jammu	Jammu district	Jammu	3,097	2,342	904	2,089.87	252.13	
Jammu	Samba district	Samba	new district	904	349	865.24	38.76	
Jammu	Udhampur district	Udhampur	4,550	2,637	1,018	2,593.28	43.72	
Jammu	Reasi district	Reasi	new district	1,719	664	1,679.99	39.01	
Jammu	Rajouri district	Rajouri	2,630	2,630	1,015	2,608.11	21.89	
Jammu	Poonch district	Poonch	1,674	1,674	646	1,649.92	24.08	
Jammu	Doda district	Doda	11,691	8,912	3,441	8,892.25	19.75	
Jammu	Ramban district	Ramban	new district	1,329	513	1,313.92	15.08	
Jammu	Kishtwar district	Kishtwar	new district	1,644	635	1,643.37	0.63	
Jammu	Total for division	Jammu	26,293	26,293	10,152	25,794.95	498.05	
Kashmir	Anantnag district	Anantnag	3,984	3,574	1,380	3,475.76	98.24	
Kashmir	Kulgam district	Kulgam	new district	410	158	360.20	49.80	
Kashmir	Pulwama district	Pulwama	1,398	1,086	419	1,047.45	38.55	
Kashmir	Shopian district	Shopian	new district	312	120	306.56	5.44	
Kashmir	Budgam district	Budgam	1,371	1,361	525	1,311.95	49.05	
Kashmir	Srinagar district	Srinagar	2,228	1,979	764	1,684.42	294.53	
Kashmir	Ganderbal district	Ganderbal	new district	259	100	233.60	25.40	
Kashmir	Bandipora district	Bandipora	new district	345	133	295.37	49.63	
Kashmir	Baramulla district	Baramulla	4,588	4,243	1,638	4,179.44	63.56	
Kashmir	Kupwara district	Kupwara	2,379	2,379	919	2,331.66	47.34	
Kashmir	Total for division	Srinagar	15,948	15,948	6,158	15,226.41	721.54	
Ladakh	Kargil district	Kargil	14,036	14,036	5,419	14,033.86	2.14	
Ladakh	Leh district	Leh	45,110	45,110	17,417	45,085.99	24.01	
Ladakh	Total for division	Leh and Kargil	59,146	59,146	22,836	59,119.85	26.15	
Total			101,387	101,387	39,146	100,141.21	1,245.74	

=== Prime ministers of the State of Jammu and Kashmir (1947–1965) ===
Colour key for parties

Indian National Congress
National Conference
Independent

# (Note: A parenthetical number indicates that the incumbent has previously held office.)	Portrait	Name	Constituency	Tenure			Assembly	Appointer	Party (Note: This column only names the chief minister's party. The state government he headed may have been a complex coalition of several parties and independents; these are not listed here.)
#	Portrait	Name	Constituency	From	To	Days in office	Assembly	Appointer	Party
1		Mehr Chand Mahajan	–	27 October 1947	30 October 1947	3 days	Interim Government	Hari Singh (Maharaja)	Independent
2		Sheikh Abdullah	–	30 October 1947	31 October 1951	5 years, 283 days	Interim Government	Hari Singh (Maharaja)	National Conference
2		Sheikh Abdullah	–	31 October 1951	9 August 1953	5 years, 283 days	1st (1951 election)	Hari Singh (Maharaja)	National Conference
3		Bakshi Ghulam Mohammad	Safa Kadal	9 August 1953	25 March 1957	10 years, 125 days	1st (1951 election)	Karan Singh (Sadr-e-Riyasat)	National Conference
3		Bakshi Ghulam Mohammad	Safa Kadal	25 March 1957	18 February 1962	10 years, 125 days	2nd (1957 election)	Karan Singh (Sadr-e-Riyasat)	National Conference
3		Bakshi Ghulam Mohammad	Safa Kadal	18 February 1962	12 October 1963	10 years, 125 days	3rd (1962 election)	Karan Singh (Sadr-e-Riyasat)	National Conference
4		Khwaja Shamsuddin	Anantnag	12 October 1963	29 February 1964	140 days	3rd (1962 election)	Karan Singh (Sadr-e-Riyasat)	National Conference
5		Ghulam Mohammed Sadiq	Tankipura	29 February 1964	30 March 1965	1 year, 30 days	3rd (1962 election)	Karan Singh (Sadr-e-Riyasat)	Indian National Congress

=== Chief ministers of Jammu and Kashmir (1965–2019) ===
# (Note: A parenthetical number indicates that the incumbent has previously held office.)	Portrait	Name	Constituency	Tenure			Assembly	Party (Note: This columnister's party. The state government he headed may have been a complex coalition of several parties and independents; these are not listed here.)
#	Portrait	Name	Constituency	From	To	Days in office	Assembly	Party
1		Ghulam Mohammed Sadiq	Tankipora	30 March 1965	21 February 1967	6 years, 257 days	3rd (1962 election)	Indian National Congress
1		Ghulam Mohammed Sadiq	Amira Kadal	21 February 1967	12 December 1971	6 years, 257 days	4th (1967 election)	Indian National Congress
2		Syed Mir Qasim	Verinag	12 December 1971	17 June 1972	3 years, 75 days	4th (1967 election)	Indian National Congress
2		Syed Mir Qasim	Verinag	17 June 1972	25 February 1975	3 years, 75 days	5th (1972 election)	Indian National Congress
3		Sheikh Abdullah	MLC	25 February 1975	26 March 1977	2 years, 29 days	5th (1972 election)	National Conference
–		Vacant (Governor's rule)	N/A	26 March 1977	9 July 1977	105 days	Dissolved	N/A
(3)		Sheikh Abdullah	Ganderbal	9 July 1977	8 September 1982	5 years, 61 days	6th (1977 election)	National Conference
4		Farooq Abdullah	Ganderbal	8 September 1982	24 November 1983	1 year, 298 days	6th (1977 election)	National Conference
4		Farooq Abdullah	Ganderbal	24 November 1983	2 July 1984	1 year, 298 days	7th (1983 election)	National Conference
5		Ghulam Mohammad Shah	MLC	2 July 1984	6 March 1986	1 year, 247 days	7th (1983 election)	Awami National Conference
–		Vacant (Governor's rule)	N/A	6 March 1986	5 September 1986	183 days	7th (1983 election)	N/A
–		Vacant (President's rule)	N/A	6 September 1986	7 November 1986	62 days	7th (1983 election)	N/A
(4)		Farooq Abdullah	Ganderbal	7 November 1986	23 March 1987	3 years, 73 days	7th (1983 election)	National Conference
(4)		Farooq Abdullah	Ganderbal	23 March 1987	19 January 1990	3 years, 73 days	8th (1987 election)	National Conference
–		Vacant (Governor's rule)	N/A	19 January 1990	18 July 1990	180 days	Dissolved	N/A
–		Vacant (President's rule)	N/A	19 July 1990	9 October 1996	6 years, 82 days	Dissolved	N/A
(4)		Farooq Abdullah	Ganderbal	9 October 1996	18 October 2002	6 years, 9 days	9th (1996 election)	National Conference
-		Vacant (Governor's rule)	N/A	18 October 2002	2 November 2002	15 days	10th (2002 election)	N/A
6		Mufti Mohammad Sayeed	Pahalgam	2 November 2002	2 November 2005	3 years, 0 days	10th (2002 election)	People's Democratic Party
7		Ghulam Nabi Azad	Bhaderwah	2 November 2005	11 July 2008	2 years, 252 days	10th (2002 election)	Indian National Congress
–		Vacant (Governor's rule)	N/A	11 July 2008	5 January 2009	178 days	Dissolved	N/A
8		Omar Abdullah	Ganderbal	5 January 2009	8 January 2015	6 years, 3 days	11th (2008 election)	National Conference
–		Vacant (Governor's rule)	N/A	8 January 2015	1 March 2015	52 days	12th (2014 election)	N/A
(6)		Mufti Mohammad Sayeed	Anantnag	1 March 2015	7 January 2016	312 days	12th (2014 election)	People's Democratic Party
–		Vacant (Governor's rule)	N/A	7 January 2016	4 April 2016	88 days	12th (2014 election)	N/A
9		Mehbooba Mufti	Anantnag	4 April 2016	19 June 2018	2 years, 76 days	12th (2014 election)	People's Democratic Party|style="background-color: #058532; color: inherit; width: 0.2em;" |
–		Vacant (Governor's rule)	N/A	20 June 2018	19 December 2018	182 days	Dissolved	N/A
–		Vacant (President's rule)	N/A	20 December 2018	30 October 2019	314 days	Dissolved	N/A

== Demographics ==
Historical population
Year	Pop.	±%
1961	3,560,976	—
1971	4,616,632	+29.6%
1981	5,987,389	+29.7%
1991	7,837,051	+30.9%
2001	10,143,700	+29.4%
2011	12,541,302	+23.6%
Source: Census of India

Jammu and Kashmir was the only state in India with a Muslim-majority population. In the Census of India held in 1961, the first to be conducted after the formation of the state, Islam was practised by 68.31% of the population, while 28.45% followed Hinduism. The proportion of population that practised Islam fell to 64.19% by 1981 but recovered afterward. According to the 2011 census, the last to be conducted in the state, Islam was practised by about 68.3% of the state population, while 28.4% followed Hinduism and small minorities followed Sikhism (1.9%), Buddhism (0.9%) and Christianity (0.3%).

== Government ==
Jammu and Kashmir was the only Indian state that had special autonomy under Article 370 of the Constitution of India, which stipulated that no law enacted by the Parliament of India, except for those in the field of defence, communication and foreign policy, would be extendable to Jammu and Kashmir unless it was ratified by the state legislature of Jammu and Kashmir. The state was able to define the permanent residents of the state who alone had the privilege to vote in state elections, the right to seek government jobs and the ability to own land or property in the state. By virtue of this autonomy, Jammu and Kashmir was the only state to have an official state flag, hoisted alongside India's national flag, and had a separate constitution. Designed by the then-ruling National Conference, the flag of Jammu and Kashmir featured a plough on a red background symbolising labour; it replaced the Maharaja's state flag. The three stripes on the flag represented the three distinct administrative divisions of the state. By 1999, 94 out of the 97 subjects in the Union List and 260 out of 395 articles of the Constitution of India had become applicable in the state, though it retained some of its autonomy. Article 370 had meanwhile become mostly symbolic.

Like all the states of India, Jammu and Kashmir had a multi-party democratic system of governance and had a bicameral legislature. At the time of drafting the Constitution of Jammu and Kashmir, 100 seats were earmarked for direct elections from territorial constituencies. Of these, 25 seats were reserved for the areas of Jammu and Kashmir state that came under Pakistani control; this was reduced to 24 after the 12th amendment of the Constitution of Jammu and Kashmir. After a delimitation in 1988, the total number of seats increased to 111, of which 87 were within Indian-administered territory. The Jammu and Kashmir Assembly had a 6-year term, in contrast to the norm of a 5-year term followed in other state assemblies. This anomaly arose because Jammu and Kashmir accepted the provision in the Forty-second Amendment of the Constitution of India but did not accept its repeal in the Forty-fourth Amendment.

The state's official language was Urdu, which occupied a central space in media, education, religious and political discourses and the legislature of Jammu and Kashmir; the language functioned as a symbol of identity among Muslims of South Asia. The first language of less than 1% of the population, it was regarded as a "neutral" and non-native language of the multilingual region, and broadly accepted by Kashmiri Muslims. The dominant position of Urdu has been criticised for rendering Kashmiri into a functional "minority language", effectively restricting its use to households and family.

=== Central provisions ===
In 1990, an Armed Forces (Special Powers) Act of India, which gave special powers to the Indian security forces, including the detaining of individuals for up to two years without presenting charges, was enforced in Jammu and Kashmir, a decision which drew criticism from Human Rights Watch and Amnesty International for violating human rights. Security forces claimed that many missing people were not detained, but had crossed into Pakistan-administered Kashmir to engage in militancy.
