= Indira–Sheikh Accord =

1975 agreement between the Indian government and Kashmiri leader Sheikh Abdullah

Accord between Prime Minister Indira Gandhi and Sheikh Abdullah
- Type: Political agreement
- Signed: 13 November 1974; 51 years ago
- Location: New Delhi, India
- Effective: 1975
- Signatories: Mirza Afzal Beg, G. Parthasarathy
- Parties: Government of India (Indira Gandhi); Jammu and Kashmir National Conference (Shaikh Abdullah)

The Indira–Sheikh Accord, also known as the Indira–Abdullah Accord, was an accord between Indira Gandhi, the then prime minister of India, and Sheikh Abdullah, leader of the Plebiscite Front (now merged into Jammu and Kashmir National Conference). The accord decided the terms under which Abdullah would reenter the politics of Kashmir. It allowed Abdullah to become the chief minister of Jammu and Kashmir again after 22 years and enabled competitive politics in the State.

While Indira Gandhi and Sheikh Abdullah were the primary architects of the accord, it was officially signed by Mirza Afzal Beg, an emissary of Abdullah, and G. Parthasarathy, the envoy of prime minister Indira Gandhi in 1975.

== Context ==
Following Pakistan's defeat and the independence of East Pakistan as Bangladesh in the Bangladesh Liberation War, the balance of power in South Asia favoured India, which may have led Sheikh Abdullah to the conclusion that he had little choice but to follow the terms India dictated. The Indian victory in Bangladesh increased Indira Gandhi's status as premier in India, and she dealt heavily with the Kashmiri demand for plebiscite. She also stated that it was inconceivable to accept Sheikh Abdullah's demand for the restoration of the pre-1953 relationship between Kashmir and India because "the clock could not be put back in this manner". In 1975, Sheikh Abdullah dropped his demand that the people of Kashmir be given the right to self-determination. Scholar Sumantra Bose states that Abdullah, whose popularity since 1953 arose from his opposition to India, would not have agreed to such terms even five years prior to the Accord.

== Accord ==
The agreement restated the conditions of Jammu and Kashmir's incorporation into India since 1953 with a clause that the state's administration would be maintained under Article 370. Sumantra Bose points out that 23 constitutional orders had been made by the mid-1970s to integrate the state into the Indian Union, and 262 Union laws had been applied to the state.

Despite retaining Article 370, the state was called "a constituent unit" of the Indian Union. The Indian government could control "the areas which mattered most" by being able to make laws concerning activities aimed at rejecting Indian sovereignty.

The Accord granted the state government the right to review only the laws that were specifically from the Concurrent List (list of powers shared by the centre and the state) extended after 1953. Only those laws could be considered for amendment or repealment. The Accord also recognised the state's right to legislate on matters such as welfare, social and cultural issues and Muslim personal law.

== Text– ==
1. The State of Jammu and Kashmir which is a constituent unit of the Union of India, shall, in its relation with the Union, continue to be governed by temporary provisions of Article 370A of the Constitution of India.
2. The residuary powers of legislation shall remain with the State; however, Parliament will continue to have power to make laws relating to the prevention of activities directed towards disclaiming, questioning or disrupting the sovereignty and territorial integrity of India or bringing about cession of a part of the territory of India or secession of a part of the territory of India from the Union or causing insult to the Indian National Flag, the Indian National Anthem and the Constitution.
3. Where any provision of the Constitution of India had been applied to the State of Jammu and Kashmir with adaptation and modification, such adaptations and modifications can be altered or repealed by an order of the President under Article 370, each individual proposal in this behalf being considered on its merits; but provisions of the Constitution of India already applied to the State of Jammu and Kashmir without adaptation or modification are unalterable.
4. With a view to assuring freedom to the State of Jammu and Kashmir to have its own legislation on matters like welfare measures, cultural matters, social security, personal law and procedural laws, in a manner suited to the special conditions in the State, it is agreed that the State Government can review the laws made by Parliament or extended to the State after 1953 on any matter relatable to the Concurrent List and may decide which of them, in its opinion, needs amendment or repeal. Thereafter, appropriate steps may be taken under Article 254 of the Constitution of India. The grant of President's assent to such legislation would be sympathetically considered. The same approach would be adopted in regard to laws to be made by Parliament in future under the Proviso to clause 2 of the Article. The State Government shall be consulted regarding the application of any such law to the State and the views of the State Government shall receive the fullest consideration.
5. As an arrangement reciprocal to what has been provided under Article 368, a suitable modification of that Article as applied to State should be made by Presidential order to the effect that no law made by the Legislature of the State of Jammu and Kashmir, seeking to make any change in or in the effect of any provision of Constitution of the State of Jammu and Kashmir relating to any of the under mentioned matters, shall take effect unless the Bill, having been reserved for the consideration of the President, receives his assent; the matters are a) the appointment, powers, functions, duties, privileges and immunities of the Governor, and b) the following matters relating to Elections namely, the superintendence, direction and control of Elections by the Election Commission of India, eligibility for inclusion in the electoral rolls without discrimination, adult suffrage and composition of the Legislative Council, being matters specified in sections 138,139, 140 and 50 of the Constitution of the State of Jammu and Kashmir.

=== Signatories ===
The accord was signed on behalf of Abdullah by Mirza Afzal Beg and on behalf of the Indian government (headed by Prime Minister Gandhi) by G. Parthasarathy on 24 February 1975 in New Delhi.

== Reactions and aftermath ==
Erstwhile commentators and India thought that the Kashmiri movement for self-determination came to an end with the accord. There were protests within the state to the Accord from Mirwaiz Maulvi Farooq who saw this as an abandonment of the Kashmiri people's demand for self-determination. Clashes occurred between the Awami Action Committee and the Plebiscite Front.

There were also protests from Jammu where Jana Sangh supporters called for abrogation of Article 370 and a complete merger of the State with India.

In an interview with Sumantra Bose, Abdul Qayyum Zargar, a veteran of the Jammu & Kashmir National Conference who had also been Mirza Afzal Beg's personal secretary, said that the terms of the Accord were "deeply unpopular" and "swallowed as a bitter pill" only because of Sheikh Abdullah's acceptance. However, not everyone acquiesced to the accord. A young activist, Shabbir Shah, created the People's League to continue the pursuit of self-determination.

According to Nyla Ali Khan, the critics of Sheikh Abdullah's "capitulation" to the Indian government forget the "pervasive power" of India in Kashmiri institutions. Even after the Accord had been concluded, Sheikh Abdullah felt that Kashmiri Muslims were "not secure in the secular India of Gandhi and Nehru".

Sumantra Bose describes the development whereby Delhi framed Abdullah's return as "clever evasion" of the Kashmir conflict, instead of a "substantive solution". However, Bose holds that Abdullah's return ushered in the first "semblance of competitive politics" to the state. Opposition to the accord continued to fester under Abdullah's rule.

== See also ==
- Article 370 of the Constitution of India
- Article 35A of the Constitution of India
- Instrument of Accession (Jammu and Kashmir)
- Revocation of the special status of Jammu and Kashmir
- Rajiv–Longowal Accord
