= Darbar Move =

Former practice of shifting capitals in Jammu and Kashmir

Darbar Move is the name given to the bi-annual shift of the secretariat and all other government offices of Jammu and Kashmir from one capital city to another. The practice, which operated from 1872 till 2021 and was revived again in 2025, involves housing governmental offices in the summer capital, Srinagar, from May to October, and in the winter capital, Jammu, during the remaining six months. The tradition was started during the rule of Maharaja Ranbir Singh in 1872. The tradition continued after 1947 as a bridge for administrative, linguistic and cultural interaction between the diverse regions of Jammu and Kashmir.

== Abolition of Darbar Move (2021) ==
On 30 June 2021, the darbar move was abolished by the Government headed by Lieutenant Governor Manoj Sinha. The employees working in the civil secretariat to vacate darbar move-related accommodation. Regarding the discontinuation of the move, on 30 March 2020, former chief secretary B. V. R Subramanyam said that government had taken concrete steps to switch paperless office by rolling out e-office in the moving departments. The administration has uploaded official records to the e-office. The switch to the online mode will avoid wear and tear as well as loss of official records during the biannual transit, besides saving the associated transportation costs. Government offices will now function at both Jammu and Srinagar.

This productive and efficient move will save money, resources and time, that could be used towards the welfare and development of the union territory. These resources can be used for the protection and propagation of the culture and heritage of the communities.

== Revival of the Darbar Move (2025) ==
On 16 October 2025, the Government of Jammu and Kashmir officially 'resumed the biannual Darbar Move' practice through Government Order No. 1357-JK(GAD) of 2025, issued by the General Administration Department. The decision followed Council of Ministers Decision No. 095/16/2025 dated 23 September 2025, reinstating the traditional shifting of offices between Srinagar and Jammu after a four-year suspension.

According to the order, all government offices listed in Annexures "A" and "B" were directed to move to Jammu "in full" or "in camp" for the Winter Session 2025–26. Offices observing a five-day week were to close at Srinagar on 31 October 2025, and those observing a six-day week on 1 November 2025, with reopening scheduled at Jammu on 3 November 2025. The order reinstated traditional arrangements such as transportation by JKRTC, police escort for convoys, medical facilities along the route, and provision of government accommodation for employees in Jammu.

This revival marks the return of the 149-year-old tradition that had been discontinued in 2021, reflecting a renewed emphasis on administrative connectivity and cultural integration between the Jammu and Srinagar regions.
