= Emblem of Jammu and Kashmir =

Indian government symbol since 2019

- Armiger: The Government of Jammu and Kashmir
- Adopted: 31 October 2019
- Shield: Lion Capital of Ashoka
- Motto: "सत्यमेव जयते" (Satyameva Jayate, Sanskrit for "Truth Alone Triumphs")

The Emblem of Jammu and Kashmir is an official symbol used to represent the government of Jammu and Kashmir, a region administered by India as a union territory.

Between 1947 and 2019, Jammu and Kashmir was administered as the State of Jammu and Kashmir. The state was reorganised into two union territories, Jammu and Kashmir and Ladakh, on 31 October 2019. The new union territory of Jammu and Kashmir has not as yet adopted a distinct symbol for official use and instead uses the words "Government of Jammu and Kashmir" on official documents either alone or in conjunction with the National Emblem of India.

== History ==
=== 1947–1952 ===
Initially the State of Jammu and Kashmir continued to use the coat of arms of the Princely State of Jammu and Kashmir.

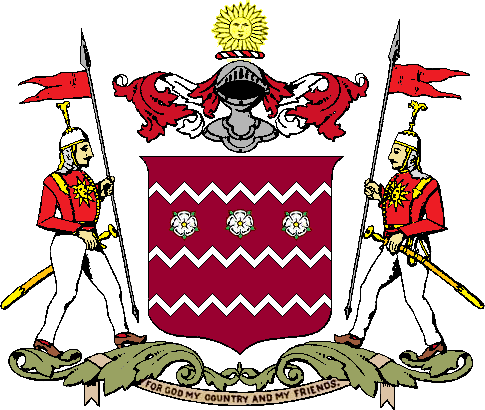
Coat of arms of the Princely State of Jammu and Kashmir

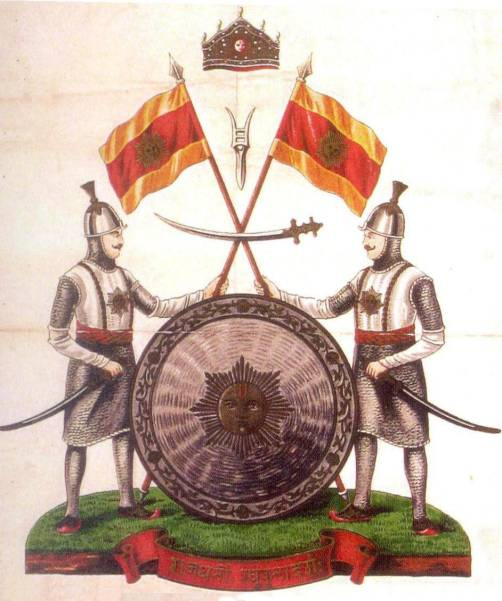
Seal of the Maharaja of Jammu and Kashmir

Flag of the princely state of Jammu and Kashmir (1936–1952)

=== 1952–2019 ===
A new emblem was adopted by the State of Jammu and Kashmir in November 1952 when the monarchy of was formally abolished. It was designed by Mohan Raina. It depicted a lotus flower rising out of a lake as its central elements. The lake was flanked by two ploughs and supported by ears of grain. Below is a triangular representation of a mountain peak and a banner bearing the name of the state in English. The three broad stripes shown within the lake represented the three geographical areas of the state at the time the emblem was adopted, the Jammu region, the Kashmir region and Ladakh.

Emblem of the State of Jammu and Kashmir (1952–2019)

Flag of the state of Jammu and Kashmir (1952–2019)

=== 2019–present ===
The state of Jammu and Kashmir was reorganised into two union territories, the Union Territory of Jammu and Kashmir and Ladakh on 31 October 2019. The new union territory of Jammu and Kashmir has not as yet adopted a distinct emblem and instead uses the words "Government of Jammu and Kashmir" on official documents either alone or in conjunction with the Emblem of India.

Emblem used by the Union Territory of Jammu and Kashmir.

== See also ==
- Flag of Jammu and Kashmir
- National Emblem of India
- List of Indian state emblems
