= Syed Mir Qasim =

Chief minister of Jammu and Kashmir from 1971 to 1975

2nd Chief Minister of Jammu and Kashmir (State)
- In office 12 December 1971 – 25 February 1975
- Preceded by: Ghulam Mohammed Sadiq
- Succeeded by: Sheikh Abdullah

Syed Mir Qasim (17 March 1921 – 12 December 2004) was an Indian politician who served as the 2nd chief minister of Jammu and Kashmir from 1971 to 1975.

Qasim's political career first began during the British Raj, when he became a leader of the non-sectarian, pro-democracy Quit Kashmir political movement. His advocacy against the monarchical rule of Maharaja Hari Singh resulted in his imprisonment.

After India's independence, Syed Mir Qasim was involved with the drafting of the Constitution of Jammu and Kashmir. He went on to serve in various State and Union positions. He is credited with having established the Indian National Congress in Kashmir. He served as the Chief Minister of Jammu and Kashmir after the death of Ghulam Mohammed Sadiq. He resigned from the office in 1975 in order to pave the way for the return of Sheikh Abdullah after the Indian Government reached an accord with the latter.

In his autobiography, My Life and Times, published in September 1992, Qasim provided interesting historical detail on the struggle of Kashmiris to throw off the yoke of monarchy in the princely state through the Quit Kashmir movement, as well as background on the issue of accession to India rather than choosing to join Pakistan.

Qasim died in an ambulance near India Gate in New Delhi on 12 December 2004 at the age of 83. In accordance with his wishes, he was buried in the village of his birth, Dooru Shahabad in Kashmir. His funeral was attended by thousands without incident. He was posthumously awarded the Padma Bhushan, India's third highest civilian award by Indian President APJ Abdul Kalam in 2005.

Political offices
Preceded by Ghulam Mohammed Sadiq	Chief Minister of Jammu and Kashmir; 1971–1975	Succeeded by Sheikh Abdullah
