= Hari Kishan Kaul =

Indian politician

Rai Bahadur Hari Kishan Kaul CSI CIE (1869 – 25 January 1942) was an Indian administrator from Punjab who, among other positions, briefly served as the Prime Minister of Jammu and Kashmir from 1931 to 1932.

== Life ==
Hari Kishan Kaul was born to Raja Suraj Kaul in a distinguished Punjabi family of Kashmiri descent. His brothers were Bal Kishan Kaul and Daya Kishan Kaul. He studied at the school of his native city and then specialized in law at the University of Delhi.

After qualifying, Kaul practised law in Lahore, where in 1911 he was responsible for the production of the authoritative Census of the Punjab. Kaul was later sent to the Bengal Supreme Court. In 1923 he moved into public administration as High Commissioner in Jalandhar. In 1931 Kaul returned to Jammu and Kashmir as Prime Minister, appointed by Maharaja Hari Singh, a post he held only until 1932.

Kaul continued working for the British Indian government as an adviser in different areas, including military, cultural and diplomatic relations, until his retirement in 1939. He then returned to Srinagar, where he died on 25 January 1942.

In 1935 Kaul's son, Hari Krishen Kaul, was born, later to be an important Indian theatre director.

== Works ==
Kaul published a number of works not only in the fields of law and Kashmiri history but also of literature.

- Pata Laran Parbath (in Kashmiri)
- Arthi

== Published sources ==
- The Indian Review, 1942, vol. 43, p. 161: obituary of Raja Hari Kishan Kaul
- Griffin, Lepel Henry, 1940:Chiefs and Families of Note in the Punjab, vol. 3, p. 90
- Rao, R Venkoba, 1928:Ministers in Indian States, vol. 1, p. 71
- Suharwardy, Abdul Haq, 1983: Tragedy in Kashmir
