= Verinag Assembly constituency =

Constituency of the Jammu and Kashmir legislative assembly in India

Verinag
- Former constituency for the Jammu and Kashmir Legislative Assembly

Constituency details
- Country: India
- Region: North India
- State: Jammu and Kashmir
- Established: 1967
- Abolished: 1972
- Total electors: 26,945

Verinag Assembly constituency was an assembly constituency in the India state of Jammu and Kashmir.

== Members of the Legislative Assembly ==
Election	Member	Party
1967	Syed Mir Qasim	Indian National Congress
1972	Syed Mir Qasim	Indian National Congress

== Election results ==
=== Assembly Election 1972 ===
1972 Jammu and Kashmir Legislative Assembly election : Verinag
Party	Candidate	Votes	%	±%
INC	Syed Mir Qasim	Unopposed		
Registered electors		26,945		▲8.57
INC hold		Swing		

=== Assembly Election 1967 ===
1967 Jammu and Kashmir Legislative Assembly election : Verinag
Party	Candidate	Votes	%	±%
INC	Syed Mir Qasim	Unopposed		
Registered electors		24,817		
INC win (new seat)				
