= Ghizer Tehsil =

- tehsil
- Country: Pakistan
- Province: Gilgit-Baltistan
- District: Ghizer
- Time zone: UTC+5 (PST)

Ghizer Tehsil is a tehsil, an administrative division of Ghizer District, an extreme western part of the Gilgit-Baltistan in Pakistan.
