= Batamaloo =

Part of srinagar city in Jammu and Kashmir, India

Batamaloo Batamalyun
- Town
- Location in Jammu and Kashmir, India Batamaloo (India)
- Coordinates: 34°4′7.32″N 74°46′41.88″E
- Country: India
- Union territory: Jammu and Kashmir
- District: Srinagar

Government
  - Type: Democracy
  - Body: Government of Jammu and Kashmir
- Elevation: 1,585 m (5,200 ft)

Languages
  - Official: Kashmiri, Urdu, Hindi, Dogri, English
- Time zone: UTC+5:30 (IST)
- Postal Code: 190009
- Vehicle registration: JK01

Batamaloo or Batmaloo (Urdu pronunciation: [bəʈɑːmɑːluː]), known as Batamalyun or Batmoul (Kashmiri pronunciation: [baʈɨmaːlʲun]) in kashmiri, is a locality in the Srinagar district, of Jammu and Kashmir, India. It is situated just about 2.5 km (1.6 mi) from Lal Chowk, Srinagar. Batamaloo is derived from Batmoul, which is composed of the two words "batte", signifying cooked rice, and "moul", signifying father, in Kashmiri. Batmaloo was also famous for its Main Bus Stop, where every bus from every district would halt but later this bus stop was moved to Qamarwari and this caused major loss of business in the Batamaloo area. Shopkeepers, daily wagers, mechanics and others lost their livelihoods and the market now looks like a haunted place where no one comes.

== Annual events ==
Batamaloo is known for the annual Urs Mubarak of Sufi saint Sheikh Dawood Sahib popularly known as Batmol Sahib.
