= Khwaja Shams-ud-Din =

Indian politician

3rd Prime Minister of Jammu and Kashmir
- In office 12 October 1963 – 29 February 1964
- President: Karan Singh
- Preceded by: Bakshi Ghulam Mohammad
- Succeeded by: Ghulam Mohammed Sadiq

Personal details
- Party: National Conference

Khwaja Shams-ud-Din (1922 – 19 April 1999) was the Prime Minister of Jammu and Kashmir for a brief period of time from 12 October 1963 to 29 February 1964. He was first elected to the Legislative Assembly in 1956 and re-elected in 1962, 1967 and 1972. It was during his administration, on 26 December 1963, that the Proposed Prophet's Relic was stolen from the Hazratbal Shrine. Weeks after that incident, he was replaced by Ghulam Mohammed Sadiq.

Political offices
Preceded by Bakshi Ghulam Mohammad	Prime Minister of Jammu and Kashmir; 1963 – 1964	Succeeded by Ghulam Mohammed Sadiq
