= Ghulam Mohammed Sadiq =

Indian politician

Ghulam Mohammad Sadiq
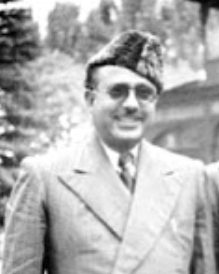

1st Chief Minister of Jammu and Kashmir (state)
- In office 30 March 1965 – 12 December 1971
- Preceded by: Himself as a Prime Minister of Jammu and Kashmir
- Succeeded by: Syed Mir Qasim

4th Prime Minister of Jammu and Kashmir
- In office 29 February 1964 – 30 March 1965
- President: Karan Singh
- Preceded by: Khwaja Shamsuddin
- Succeeded by: Himself as a Chief Minister of Jammu and Kashmir

Personal details
- Party: National Conference
- Other political affiliations: Indian National Congress
- Education: Islamia College, Lahore and Aligarh Muslim University

Ghulam Mohammed Sadiq (1912 – 1971) was an Indian politician, who served as the Prime Minister of Jammu and Kashmir from 1964 to 1965, when the position was renamed to Chief Minister. He continued as the Chief Minister till his death in 1971.

== Education and career ==
He was a graduate of Islamia College in Lahore and Aligarh Muslim University. He served in Sheikh Abdullah's first cabinet from 1947 to 1953. He was the leader of the National Conference party from 1957 to 1961 after which he joined the Indian National Congress. He was elected the Prime Minister of Jammu and Kashmir in 1964. He became the first chief minister of the state in 1965, when the J&K Constitution was amended (Sixth Constitution of J&K Amendment Act, 1965) by the then Congress government and the position of Prime Minister was replaced with Chief Minister.

He died in office following a heart attack on 12 December 1971.

== Bibliography ==
- Bose, Sumantra (2003), Kashmir: Roots of Conflict, Paths to Peace, Harvard University Press, ISBN 0-674-01173-2
- Das Gupta, Jyoti Bhusan (2012), Jammu and Kashmir, Springer, ISBN 978-94-011-9231-6

Political offices
Preceded by Khwaja Shamsuddin	Prime Minister of Jammu and Kashmir; 1964 – 1965	Succeeded by Office Abolished
Preceded by Office Created	Chief Minister of Jammu and Kashmir; 1965 – 1971	Succeeded by Syed Mir Qasim
