= 2019–2021 Jammu and Kashmir lockdown =

Lockdown imposed after revocation of the special status of Jammu and Kashmir

- Part of the Insurgency in Jammu and Kashmir and Kashmir conflict
- Map of India with Jammu and Kashmir, administered as a union territory, highlighted in red
- Date: 5 August 2019 – 5 February 2021 (1 year, 6 months and 1 day); 2 September 2021 - 6 September 2021 (4 days) (preventative security lockdown due to the death of separatist leader Syed Ali Shah Geelani)
- Location: Jammu and Kashmir, India; 34.0333°N 74.6667°E
- Caused by: Insurgency in Jammu and Kashmir, Revocation of Jammu and Kashmir's special status
- Methods: Curfew, communications and media blackout, increased military presence, Barring court cases against the autonomy revocation
- Status: Initial lockdown ended on 5 February 2021, Syed Geelani lockdown ended on 4 September 2021 (7 September 2021 for Srinagar and Budgam); All communications services restored (On an average Internet services are suspended in South Kashmir districts once a week for militancy related precautionary measures); Extra security forces withdrawn; Resumption of tourist and economic activity

Casualties and losses
- Deaths: ~69 (including security forces, civilians, militants)
- Arrested: ~3,800–4,000 (including 200 politicians, 100 separatist leaders)
- Charged: 3,000 civilian were listed as stone pelters, 150 people were accused of alleged association with militant groups involved in the insurgency in Jammu and Kashmir

The 2019–2021 Jammu and Kashmir lockdown was a lockdown and communications blackout imposed throughout Indian-administered Jammu and Kashmir following the revocation of Article 370, which had granted limited autonomy to the union territory, in August 2019. The lockdown lasted until February 2021 with the goal of preemptively curbing unrest, violence and protests. Thousands of civilians, mostly young men, were detained in the crackdown. The Indian government said that the tough lockdown measures and substantially increased deployment of security forces had been aimed at curbing terrorism. The government did not want a repeat of the death and injuries seen during the 2016–2017 Kashmir unrest.

The revocation and subsequent lockdown drew condemnation from several countries, especially Pakistan, which lodged protests with India.

On 5 February 2021, Jammu and Kashmir's Principal Secretary of Power and Information announced that 4G internet services would be restored in the entire union territory. Subsequently, the ban of 4G and 3G services ended, with a brief restoration of the lockdown in September 2021.

== Timeline ==
The lockdown officially started on 5 August 2019, following the revocation of the special status of Jammu and Kashmir via the scrapping of Article 370 and Article 35A of the Indian constitution and subsequent introduction of the Jammu and Kashmir Reorganisation Act, 2019. Foreign journalists were barred from reporting from the new union territory of Jammu and Kashmir.

According to a 6 September 2019 report by the Indian government, nearly 4,000 people were arrested in the disputed region. Among those arrested were more than 200 local Kashmiri politicians, including two former chief ministers of the state of Jammu and Kashmir, along with more than 100 leaders and activists from the All Parties Hurriyat Conference.

On 1 October 2019, a three-judge bench consisting of justices N. V. Ramana, Ramayyagari Subhash Reddy and Bhushan Ramkrishna Gavai of the Supreme Court of India, heard seven appeals challenging the lockdown and revocation of Article 370.

On 3 October 2019, journalists in Kashmir staged a sit-in protest against the enforced communications blackout, describing the total blockade of internet services and mobile phones as a "gag".

On 4 October 2019, the Indian government denied United States Senator Chris Van Hollen's request to travel to Jammu and Kashmir. Meanwhile, Sandeep Pandey, an education reformer, and other activists who were on an informal fact-finding mission were also barred from leaving the airport in Srinagar. On the same day, protests were held by the local Kashmiri people, where they chanted pro-Pakistan slogans and demanded an end to what they described as the "Indian occupation of their territory".

On 24 October 2019, village council elections were held across Jammu and Kashmir, despite a boycott by most political parties and the detention of many mainstream local politicians. Political scientist Noor Ahmed Baba called it "more like an artificial exercise".

In January 2020, a 2G internet connection was established in Jammu & Kashmir, albeit only for limited whitelisted sites approved by the Indian government. Social Media was completely banned. Security personnel checked the mobile phones of the local Kashmiris to see if they were accessing social media with a VPN.

A new curfew was imposed a day ahead of the first anniversary of India's decision to revoke the disputed region's semi-autonomy, on 4 August 2020. Officials announced a two-day "full curfew" citing intelligence reports of looming protests in the Muslim-majority region, where locals have called for the anniversary to be marked as a "black day".

On 16 August 2020, 4G LTE mobile services were restored in two districts of the union territory of Jammu and Kashmir on a trial basis, after the Supreme Court of India ruled that an indefinite shutdown was effectively illegal.

At least 75 Kashmiri leaders and activists were pre-emptively arrested in December 2020 to limit political unrest after a number of opposition political parties won elections in Jammu and Kashmir.

On 5 February 2021, Jammu and Kashmir's Principal Secretary of Power and Information, Rohit Kansal, announced that 4G internet services would be restored in the entire union territory. This was applauded by the union territory former Chief Ministers Omar Abdullah and Farooq Abdullah. The move was lauded by Jammu and Kashmir Apni Party president Altaf Bukhari and Srinagar Mayor Junaid Azim Mattu.

On September 2, security forces imposed a new lockdown and restriction on communications until 4 September 2021, following the death of Syed Ali Shah Geelani, a top Kashmiri separatist leader. In flak jackets and riot gear, armed police and paramilitary personnel patrolled the streets in Srinagar on 4 September 2021 and ordered residents to stay indoors. Razor wire, steel barricades, and armored vehicles blocked some streets. The situation in Srinagar and Budgam returned to normal by 7 September.

== Motive ==
The Washington Post reported that in 2020, Facebook’s Coordinated Inauthentic Behavior team discovered an extensive social media influence campaign operated by the Chinar Corps that used a network of hundreds of fake accounts to praise the Indian army's crackdown in the Kashmir region and accuse Kashmiri journalists of separatism and sedition. The Stanford Internet Observatory research team also pointed to circumstantial evidence of a link between the accounts and the Indian army unit.

== Re-introduction of tourism and economic recovery ==
=== Tourism ===
In October 2019, the Indian government planned to re-introduce tourism in the union territory of Jammu and Kashmir and lift security restrictions for all foreigners visiting the region, although they would still be prevented from using mobile internet or cellphones. 2G mobile services were restored in January 2020, while 4G services in Ganderbal and Udhampur were restarted in August 2020. 4G mobile Internet services were fully restored across Jammu and Kashmir in February 2021. In the wake of Syed Ali Shah Geelani's death, a new preemptive blackout was done in early September 2021, which ended completely on 7 September 2021.

Figures show 19,000 tourists visited the Union Territory in January 2021, compared to only 3,750 tourists that visited Srinagar in January 2020. In August 2021, Srinagar Airport reported over 8000 passengers in one day. Kuldeep Singh (Director of Srinagar Airport) revealed that out of 72 major airports in India, Srinagar International Airport had become the first to surpass pre Covid passenger arrivals in August 2021. The director stated, "On Friday alone at Srinagar airport, 8515 passengers traveled on 74 flights to and fro and within this month, we are expecting it will cross above 10000."

In July 2021, a total of around 10.5 lakh (1.05 million) tourists visited Jammu and Kashmir, and rose to 11.22 lakh (1.122 million) tourists in August 2021.

=== Economic recovery ===
In 2021, the government of Jammu and Kashmir launched an industrial policy. By mid August Rs 23,000 crore (230 billion INR) worth of investment proposals were cleared by the J&K Government, of which 12,000 crore was in Jammu Division and 11,000 crore in Kashmir Division. Investment proposals rose to Rs 25,000 crore (250 billion INR) by early September, with investments in Jammu Division rising to 12,800 crore and Kashmir Division to 12,200 crore.

== Reactions ==
=== Human rights groups ===
- Amnesty International — The NGO for human rights started an online petition titled Let Kashmir Speak, which demanded a lifting of the blackout of communications in Jammu and Kashmir while letting the voices of the people of Kashmir be heard and allowing unconditional and unconstrained access to news and information from the valley.
- Human Rights Watch - The global rights group asked India to release all those detained without charge and restore communications. It also called India to reverse its abusive policies in J&K and said it was appalled India continued with its repression of Kashmiri Muslims.

=== International ===
- Pakistan – Pakistan reacted with extreme alarm to the revocation of Jammu and Kashmir's special status and subsequent lockdown, in what it viewed as the unilateral annexation of an internationally disputed region. Pakistani officials said that the country would downgrade diplomatic ties with India, dismiss the Indian High Commissioner to Pakistan, and halt bilateral trade with New Delhi. The Indian government's actions were met with outrage by the Pakistani people, who held nationwide protests against the "illegal Indian military occupation" and in solidarity with the Kashmiri people, with the Government of Pakistan subsequently designating 5 August to be observed as the Youm-e-Istehsal (transl. 'Day of Exploitation') annually.
- United Arab Emirates – the UAE ambassador to India, Al Banna said that his country had acknowledged the latest events in Jammu and Kashmir. He stated that this restructuring was not an unprecedented occurrence in the history of India and that the decision was intended to decrease regional inequality and enhance operational efficiency for the Indian government. He labelled India's latest decision in Jammu and Kashmir to be its internal issue.
- United States –President Donald Trump volunteered to serve as a mediator for the Kashmir dispute between India and Pakistan, but only if both countries accepted his offer. Alice Wells, the Assistant Secretary of State for South and Central Asian Affairs, said in a statement that the U.S. hoped "to see rapid action – the lifting of the restrictions and the release of those who have been detained". She added that the U.S. was "concerned by widespread detentions, including those of politicians and business leaders, and the restrictions on the residents of Jammu and Kashmir". US lawmakers Ilhan Omar, Rashida Tlaib and Alexandria Ocasio-Cortez have also called for an end to the communications blockade.

=== Supranational ===
- Organisation of Islamic Cooperation – A resolution passed by the OIC's Council of Foreign Ministers during a session held in Niamey, Niger stated that the organisation rejects the illegal and unilateral actions by India on August 5, 2019, to change the internationally recognised disputed status of the Indian occupied Jammu and Kashmir, and demands that India rescind its illegal steps.
- United Nations – The United Nations' special rapporteur on freedom of expression, David Kaye, said in a statement that "there's something about this shutdown that is draconian in a way other shutdowns usually are not". Secretary-General Antonio Guterres raised concern over the new limitations placed on Indian-administered Jammu and Kashmir, adding that the latest events could exacerbate the human rights situation in the region. He urged Pakistan and India to exercise restraint with each other and to engage in bilateral dialogue to de-escalate the already-sensitive situation. Michelle Bachelet, UN High Commissioner for Human Rights, raised concern regarding "the human rights of Kashmiris, including restrictions on internet communications and peaceful assembly, and the detention of local political leaders and activists" at the 42nd Session of the United Nations Human Rights Council.

== See also ==
- State of emergency in India
- Human rights abuses in Jammu and Kashmir
- India-Pakistan relations
  - Indo-Pakistani wars and conflicts
  - Kashmir conflict
