= Revocation of the special status of Jammu and Kashmir =

2019 Indian political incident

On 5 August 2019, the government of India revoked the special status, or autonomy, granted under Article 370 of the Indian constitution to Jammu and Kashmir—a region administered by India as a state which consists of the larger part of Kashmir which has been the subject of dispute among India, Pakistan, and China since 1947.

J&K State flag along with union flag (India) at Civil secretariat, Srinagar

Among the Indian government actions accompanying the revocation was the cutting off of communication lines in the Kashmir Valley which was restored after 5 months. Thousands of additional security forces were deployed to curb any uprising. Several leading Kashmiri politicians were taken into custody, including the former chief minister. Government officials described these restrictions as designed for preempting violence, and justified the revocation for enabling people of the state to access government programmes such as reservation, right to education and right to information.

The reactions in Kashmir Valley were effectively suppressed through the suspension of communication and with imposition of Curfew (Section 144). People in the Hindu-majority Jammu and Buddhist-majority Ladakh regions welcomed the decision and held celebrations in support of it, however, some opposition was also reported from the Muslims in the latter region. Many nationalists celebrated, declaring the move to herald public order and prosperity in Kashmir. Among political parties in India, the revocation was supported by the ruling Bharatiya Janata Party, and, among others, by the Bahujan Samaj Party, the Aam Aadmi Party, AIADMK, Telugu Desam Party, YSR Congress Party, BJD, Janata Dal (United) and the Shiv Sena. It was opposed by the Indian National Congress, Jammu & Kashmir National Conference, Jammu and Kashmir Peoples Democratic Party, DMK, Rashtriya Janata Dal, Communist Party of India (Marxist), Communist Party of India and the Trinamool Congress.

The president of India issued an order under the powers conferred by Article 367, overriding the prevailing 1954 Presidential Order and nullifying all the provisions granting autonomy to the state. The Home Minister introduced a Reorganisation Bill in the Indian parliament, seeking to divide the state into two union territories, each to be governed by a lieutenant governor and a unicameral legislature. The resolution seeking the revocation of the temporary special status under Article 370 and the bill for the state's reorganisation was debated and passed by the Rajya Sabha, India's upper house of parliament – on 5 August 2019. On 6 August, the Lok Sabha, India's lower house of parliament – debated and passed the reorganisation bill along with the resolution recommending the revocation.

The revocation of special status brought changes to the region’s governance, administration and security policies. It was followed by the implementation of constitutional provisions, new domicile rules, changes in local governance, and a reported decline in stone-pelting. The region also witnessed a rise in tourism, renewed discussions on the restoration of statehood, and saw increased international engagement.

== Background ==
Article 370 of the Indian constitution gave special status to Jammu and Kashmir — a state in India, located in the northern part of the Indian subcontinent, and a part of the larger region of Kashmir, which has been the subject of dispute between India, Pakistan and China. The Article conferred power on Jammu and Kashmir to have a separate constitution, a state flag and autonomy over the internal administration of the state. The Constituent Assembly of Jammu and Kashmir, after its establishment, was empowered to recommend the articles of the Indian constitution that should be applied to the state or to abrogate Article 370 altogether. After consultation with the state's Constituent Assembly, the 1954 Presidential Order was issued, specifying the articles of the Indian constitution that applied to the state. The Constituent Assembly dissolved itself without recommending the abrogation of Article 370, the article was deemed to have become a permanent feature of the Indian Constitution. This article, along with Article 35A, defined that the Jammu and Kashmir state's residents live under a separate set of laws, including those related to citizenship, ownership of property, and fundamental rights, as compared to residents of other Indian states.

Under various Indian National Congress party-led central governments and locally elected state governments — such as those of the National Conference — between 1954 and 2011, India used the provisions of Article 370 to issue presidential orders to extend the Indian constitution to Jammu and Kashmir with the concurrence of the State Government, and reduce the state's autonomy. These past Presidential orders under Article 370 are also controversial and a subject of the Kashmir dispute. Political scientist Sumantra Bose, a Kashmir scholar, sums up the politics of the period 1953–63, during which Bakshi Ghulam Mohammad served as the Prime Minister of Jammu and Kashmir in these words:

Bakshi Ghulam Mohammed’s term in office lasted a full decade, until October 1963. The sequence of events during that decade strongly suggests a contractual relationship between Bakshi and the government of India, whereby he would be allowed to run an unrepresentative, unaccountable government in Srinagar in return for facilitating IJK’s "integration" with India on New Delhi’s terms. The result was twofold: a crippling of rule of law and democratic institutions in IJK; and an erosion of IJK’s autonomy, achieved (as required by Article 370) with the "concurrence" of IJK’s government—which consisted of a motley clique of New Delhi's client politicians."

Further, in Bose's view, the 1954 Presidential order and the subsequent orders began "the end for the Article 370" and it has "effectively been dead in letter and in spirit since that time".

Since the partition of India and Pakistan on religious lines, Hindu nationalist organizations in India, including in Jammu and Kashmir, have stated that Jammu and Kashmir is an integral, inseparable part of India. As in past election manifestos, the Bharatiya Janata Party included the integration of Jammu and Kashmir among its campaign promises for the 2019 Indian general election. The BJP and its allies won a landslide majority in the Lok Sabha, the lower house of the Indian Parliament. On 5 August 2019, India issued a Presidential order superseding the 1954 order that made all the provisions of the Indian constitution applicable to Jammu and Kashmir. Following the resolutions passed in both houses of the parliament, the President of India issued a further order on 6 August declaring all the clauses of Article 370 except clause 1 to be inoperative.

Historically, Ladakh was the main place for the calls for more autonomy following India's independence in 1947, a movement emerged in Ladakh to "free Ladakh from Kashmir". Leh's Buddhist leadership largely defined its politics through a sense of antagonism towards Kashmir. Early demands for separation and direct rule under the Indian Union or amalgamation with Hindu-majority areas of Jammu were articulated by organizations like the Young Men’s Buddhist Association (YMBA) and the Ladakh Buddhist Association (LBA) to Maharaja Hari Singh and later to Jawaharlal Nehru. Nehru, declined these demands to avoid weakening India's stance on Kashmir in the UN Security Council.

The political system in Kashmir was perceived by many Ladakhi's as fundamentally communalist, influencing their strategies. Ladakhi leaders, both Muslim and Buddhist, felt discriminated against by the state government. The Gajendragadkar Commission of Inquiry (1968) officially recognized that J&K was composed of three separate homogeneous regions: Jammu, Kashmir, and Ladakh.

In 1979, Ladakh was split into two districts: Leh (predominantly Buddhist) and Kargil (predominantly Muslim), a move seen by some as an attempt to divide the population along religious lines and weaken the Buddhist movement. This led to distinct political alignments, with Leh's Buddhist-based identity politics often diverging from Kargil's Muslim-based politics.

The late 1980s saw a renewed and at times violent agitation for Union Territory (UT) status, launched by the Ladakh People’s Movement for Union Territory Status (LPMUTS), which accused the Kashmir government of treating Ladakhis as "third-rate citizens". This period also saw a "social boycott" of Kashmiri Muslims, and later all Muslims, which severely impacted inter-communal relations. Following the 1989 agitation, a significant portion of Ladakh's population was granted Scheduled Tribe (ST) status, and Autonomous Hill Development Councils (LAHDCs) were established for Leh (1995) and later Kargil (2003) as an interim measure, though the demand for UT status persisted.

The abrogation of Article 370 in August 2019 by the Narendra Modi Government led to the reorganization of J&K into two Union Territories: Jammu and Kashmir (with a legislature) and Ladakh (without a legislature). This move was largely celebrated in Leh, where leaders had long sought separation from Kashmir. However, in Kargil, the decision was met with despondency and protests, with leaders observing it as a "black day" and initially identifying with Kashmir-based sentiments.

On 5 August 2019, some political parties of Jammu and Kashmir met at the home of politician Farooq Abdullah and released a joint statement, called the People's Alliance for Gupkar Declaration, that pledged to defend and safeguard the identity, autonomy and special status of Jammu and Kashmir.

The creation of Ladakh as a UT without a legislature meant that political representation was significantly reduced, with only a single Member of Parliament (MP) representing the region. This centralization of power, with administration largely in the hands of bureaucrats and the Lieutenant Governor led to a sense of political disempowerment and alienation.

== Legal aspects ==
Article 370 of the Constitution of India was a 'temporary provision' inserted on 17 October 1949 which gave special powers to the state of Jammu and Kashmir, lawfully authorising it to have its own constitution. Accordingly, the provisions of only Article 1 and Article 370 of the Indian Constitution applied to the state. So, for the Central government to extend the coverage of a central law to the state on subjects included in the Instrument of Accession (IoA), it needed "consultation" while for extending the coverage of laws on other subjects, it needed "concurrence" of the state government. Similarly, Article 35A of the Constitution of India, introduced through a constitutional order in 1954, authorised the state legislature to define 'permanent residents'. Those defined as permanent residents were entitled to property rights, employment, scholarships and other social benefits in the state.

After the 1954 order, forty-seven Presidential orders were issued between 11 February 1956 and 19 February 1994, making various other provisions of the Constitution of India applicable to Jammu and Kashmir. All these orders were issued with the 'concurrence of the Government of the State' without any Constituent Assembly. Some of these Presidential orders were issued when the state was under President's rule and had "no Kashmir government at all", states Jill Cottrell. The effect of the Presidential orders issued between 1954 and 1994 had been to extend 94 of the 97 subjects in the Union List (the powers of the Central Government), and 260 of the 395 Articles of the Constitution of India to the State of Jammu and Kashmir.

=== Government approach ===
In April 2018, the Supreme Court of India ruled that Article 370 had attained permanency since the state constituent assembly has ceased to exist. To overcome this legal challenge, the Indian government instead rendered Article 370 as 'inoperative' even though it still exists in the constitution. On 5 August, a presidential order was issued – the Constitution (Application to Jammu and Kashmir) Order, 2019 – which superseded the Constitution (Application to Jammu and Kashmir) Order, 1954.

The August 2019 Presidential order stated that all the provisions of the Indian Constitution applied to Jammu and Kashmir. This in effect meant that the separate Constitution of Jammu and Kashmir stood abrogated, and a single constitution now applied to all the Indian states. The President issued the order with the "concurrence of the Government of State of Jammu and Kashmir". This in effect meant the concurrence of the Governor of Jammu and Kashmir since President's rule was imposed at that time in the state. (Note: 30 July 1986 Presidential order on Jammu and Kashmir used an equivalent procedure. While the Congress party central government led by Rajiv Gandhi was in power, the President of India made an order under Article 370, on 30 July 1986, extending to Jammu and Kashmir Article 249 of the Indian Constitution in order to empower Indian Parliament to legislate on matters in the State List after obtaining a Rajya Sabha resolution. The then Governor Jagmohan gave concurrence on behalf of the state government while the state was under President's rule, despite protests from G. A. Lone – the Law secretary of Jammu and Kashmir – and in the absence of a Council of Ministers.) The order was issued using the third clause of Article 370, which authorised the President of India to declare the article inoperative with exceptions and modifications, if recommended by the Constituent Assembly of Jammu and Kasmir (dissolved in 1957) to do so. To circumvent the legal issue of the non-existent state constituent assembly, the President used the Clause (I) of Article 370, which conferred him with the power to modify the Indian Constitution on subjects related to Jammu and Kashmir. So he first added a new clause to Article 367, which deals with interpretation of the Constitution. He replaced the phrase 'Constituent Assembly of the State' with 'Legislative Assembly of the State'. Since the state legislative assembly has been suspended, the order says that any reference to the legislative assembly will be construed as a reference to the Governor of Jammu and Kashmir. The governor is an appointee of the Central government. Therefore, the Indian Parliament now functions for the state legislative assembly.

Reorganisation Act, 2019

Tree chart

Draft constitution (Constituent Assembly of India)	26 October 1947, Instrument of Accession of Jammu and Kashmir princely state to the Union of India	Prime Ministers (Dewans) of Jammu and Kashmir princely state (1947-1965)
Article 306
Constitution of India
Article 370
The Constitution (Application to Jammu and Kashmir) Order, 1950
The Constitution of India (Application to Jammu and Kashmir) Second Amendment Order 1952 (C.O. 48)	Sadr-e-Riyasat of Jammu and Kashmir
Article 35A
47 Presidential orders were issued between 11 February 1956 and 19 February 1994	Constitution of Jammu and Kashmir adopted 17 November 1956	Governor of Jammu and Kashmir	Chief Ministers of the state of Jammu and Kashmir (1965-2019)
5 August 2019
Article 35A stands abolished	The Constitution (Application to J&K) Order, 2019 (C.O. 272)
C.O. 272 supersedes C.O. 48	Constitution of Jammu and Kashmir rendered infructuous	Rajya Sabha passes J&K Reorganisation Act, 2019
6 August 2019
As of August 2021, there have been 105 amendments of the Constitution of India since it was first enacted in 1950.	Declaration under Article 370(3) of the Constitution (C.O. 273)	Lok Sabha passes J&K Reorganisation Act, 2019
Presidential assent for J&K Reorganisation Act, 2019 on 9 August 2019
Union Territory of Jammu and Kashmir	Union Territory of Ladakh	Lieutenant Governor of Jammu and Kashmir	Lieutenant Governor of Ladakh	Chief Minister of union territory of Jammu and Kashmir
Reorganisation Orders: Five orders deal with the union territory of Jammu and Kashmir and three with the union territory of Ladakh

Hence, the Indian Home Minister moved a resolution in the Rajya Sabha to give the President the necessary recommendation he needs to declare Article 370 as inoperative. Subsequently, the statutory resolution seeking the revocation of the special status under Article 370 and the bill for the state's reorganisation was debated and passed by the Rajya Sabha on 5 August 2019 with 125 (67%) votes in its favour and 61 (33%) against it. On 6 August, the bill for the reorganisation was debated and passed by the Lok Sabha with 370 (86%) votes in its favour and 70 (14%) against it, and the resolution recommending the revocation was passed by 351 votes in favour and 72 against.

=== Petitions against abrogation ===
On 28 August 2019, the Supreme Court of India agreed to hear multiple petitions challenging the abrogation of Article 370 and the subsequent bifurcation of Jammu and Kashmir into two union territories. It constituted a five-judge bench for the same. The court also issued notices to the government, seeking a reply to the petitions, whereby declining pleas by the government which argued that the notices could be cited in international forums such as the United Nations. Additionally, the court ordered the government to reply within seven days to a petition seeking an end to the restrictions on communications as well as other restrictions in the region.

The Supreme Court heard the petitions on 30 September 2019. It allowed the central government to submit its replies to the petitions in 30 days and fixed 14 November 2019 as the next date of hearing. The petitioners wanted the court to issue an injunction against reorganisation of the state into two union territories but the court declined to issue any injunction. This means that the two union territories came into existence on 31 October 2019 as planned.

=== Legal Scholars ===
In an article for the Indian Law Review, Balu G. Nair noted the orders to be "constitutionally suspect". Deva Zaid finds the orders to be extra-constitutional. Rajeev Dhavan opined that Art. 370 can't be "abrogated". Gautam Bhatia found the entire episode to be fraught with legal and constitutional defects. Suhrith Parthasarathy opined the orders to be unconstitutional.

=== 2023 Supreme Court Judgement ===
On 11 December 2023, a five-judge bench of the Supreme Court of India unanimously upheld the Indian Government's decision to abrogate Article 370. The bench said that article 370 of the Constitution was a 'temporary provision' and the president had the power to revoke it. They also recommended that elections be held in Jammu and Kashmir before 30 September 2024.

Supreme Court Justice Sanjay Kishan Kaul said that there would be a commission necessary to investigate human rights incidents since 1980 whether they were committed by state or non-state actors.

== Government clampdown ==
Prior to the revocation of the status, the Ministry of Home Affairs granted approval for the mobilization of thousands of paramilitary security troops into Jammu and Kashmir, citing reason to maintain law and order in the area. On 2 August, Indian Army said that the Pakistan Army and terrorists are "planning to upscale violence" and tried to "target the Yatra recently." The Government of India notified students and tourists, both local and foreign, to leave Jammu and Kashmir. These actions sparked fears that India would soon be revoking Jammu and Kashmir's special status. However, on 3 August, Omar Abdullah said that Governor Satya Pal Malik "assured him there was no initiative in progress to dilute Article 35A of the Constitution, start delimitation or trifurcate."

On 4 August, satellite phones were distributed in central, north and south Kashmir among the security forces. The government thereafter ordered a total communication blackout, shutting down cable TV, landlines, cellphones and the Internet. Many news sources reported an effective curfew (although The Telegraph of Kolkata reports that the government did not officially announce a curfew). Doctors and district administrators were advised to remain on standby.

Prior to the 5 August revocation announcement, Section 144 curfew was imposed in the Muslim-majority Kashmir Valley, the Hindu-majority Jammu region and the Muslim & Buddhist populated Ladakh region. The current lockdown was far more intense in the Srinagar (Kashmir) region, where "people are used to curfews and living under a heavy security presence", according to The Guardian newspaper. Concrete barricades blocked roads every few hundred meters. Shops and clinics were closed, as were all educational institutions and a red alert was sounded across Jammu and Kashmir. The government lifted Section 144 curfew and reopened schools in some Jammu region districts effective 10 August 2019.

Many Indian media reported that they had no information coming from the Kashmir Valley and could not even ascertain if their correspondents were safe or not. Journalists were not issued curfew passes. The Committee to Protect Journalists (CPJ) reported that Qazi Shibli – a local journalist and editor of news website The Kashmiriyat Walla, was arrested by the Jammu and Kashmir Police on 28 July 2019 on unspecified charges, but it was unclear on 5 August 2019 if he is still under arrest. Many journalists reported being stopped by soldiers and others stated they had to send photos out of the state via USB flash drives. A local journalist told CPJ that "I fear that they will arrest journalists, especially those who will report what is happening". CPJ later reported that at least 2 journalists were detained amid tensions in Jammu and Kashmir.

In addition to local Kashmiri journalists, editors of several Indian newspapers and television stations complained that their teams have not been able to send in their reports from most of the Muslim-majority Kashmir Valley, except for a few blocks in Srinagar. However, the managing editor of the Indian Times Now English news channel, Navika Kumar said, "her channel had not faced much restriction broadcasting from Kashmir and reporters were sending feeds through satellite-linked outside broadcasting vans", according to Reuters. The Times Now and other media groups of India have been criticized as "conformist" and alleged to "look like they are afraid of the government" by H. K. Dua – a former media advisor of two former Indian prime ministers.

More than 4,000 Kashmiri protesters were reported to be arrested by 18 August, including several Kashmiri leaders to prevent any protest or outbreak of violence. This figure was about 500 by 9 August. Jammu and Kashmir's former chief ministers Mehbooba Mufti and Omar Abdullah, and MLAs Mohammed Yousuf Tarigami and Engineer Rashid were among those placed under "preventive detention" by the security forces.

In January 2020, Human Rights Watch reported that the Indian government-imposed clampdown in Kashmir is being slowly and gradually eased of restrictions, but to a large extent continues to fail in preserving the rights of the Kashmiri people. The lawyers, shop keepers, rights activists, students, who had been under arrest have been released, but on the condition of never criticising the government in the future again. Meanwhile, some notable political figures including former chief ministers, too, continue to remain in custody.

=== Government's rationale ===
India's Foreign minister Subrahmanyam Jaishankar defended the clampdown saying that this was done to prevent an outbreak of violence and civilian casualties, citing the unrest caused after the death of militant Burhan Wani in 2016. He said that it was not possible to stop communication among militants without putting the entire region under a blackout.

The Government of Jammu and Kashmir stated that the restrictions on Internet access, among other restrictions, were imposed to preempt the disruption of public order by various "anti-national" elements. It said that the misuse of data services and Internet by "terrorists" to conduct terrorism and to incite people by spreading fake news necessitated such restrictions, which will be gradually reduced.

=== Restoration of services ===
On 16 August, B. V. R. Subrahmanyam – the chief secretary of Jammu and Kashmir, announced that the government will lift lockdown and remove some restrictions in a phased manner in the Kashmir Valley. According to Reuters, telephone services were to be resumed in parts of Srinagar on 16 August 2019, only to face delays in implementation. Landline phone services, indicated Subrahmanyam, would be restored in most of Srinagar by 18 August 2019. Central government was adamant about reopening schools in the valley in the week of 19 August 2019 amid curfew-like situation. However, when some schools were opened in the valley, several media reported that children did not go to schools at all. According to Subrahmanyam, "12 of 22 [Jammu and Kashmir] districts were already functioning normally, and measures have been put in place to ensure zero loss of lives on any side or serious injuries to anyone. Telecom connectivity will be eased and restored in a phased manner keeping in mind the constant threat by terror organizations".

As of 25 August 2019, landline services were restored in most places in the Kashmir Valley. On September 4, only 50,000 landline connections were operational throughout the valley. On 14 October 2019, postpaid mobile phone services were fully restored in the region. As of 3 January 2020, mobile Internet has still not been fully restored in the region. At 153 days and counting, this has become the largest internet shutdown in India.

On 13 January 2020, an article by Reuters reported that the Internet services have not been fully restored in Kashmir, forcing Kashmiris to board a crowded train – dubbed as the 'Internet Express' – to travel to a nearby town of Banihal for using Internet at cybercafes for 300 rupees ($4.20) an hour. The Vice President of the Kashmir Chamber of Commerce and Industry, Majeed Mir, claims almost 500,000 jobs have been lost since the blockade, stating that "irreversible damage has been caused to the economy".

On 14 January 2020, broadband Internet services were restored to select organizations/individuals in the Kashmir Valley and 2G mobile services were restored in five districts located in the Jammu region.

On 18 January 2020, 2G Internet service was restored for 153 white listed websites in all the 10 districts of Jammu Division and in 2 districts Kupwara and Bandipura of Kashmir Valley for postpaid mobile service. Voice call and SMS services were also restored for the whole Union Territory.

On 25 January 2020, 2G Internet services were restored for all 20 districts on both pre-paid and postpaid mobiles for 301 white-listed websites.

As of 26 February 2020, broadband Internet services remain banned to the general public. Until 4 March 2020, the number of whitelisted websites were increased. Still only 2G Internet service was accessible. On 4 March 2020, Internet services were fully restored but restricted to 2G Internet speed.

From July 2020, the Indian Union government will allow Indian security forces to buy land in certain areas of the Indian administered Kashmir. This is a reversal from an earlier policy, where the Indian security forces had to request special permission to buy land in the area. Only locals were able to buy land in Indian administered Kashmir, however, with the government scrapping Kashmir's autonomy, Indian security forces can buy land and live in Kashmir.

On 16 August 2020, high speed mobile internet services (4G/LTE) were restored in two districts of the union territory of J&K on a trial basis, after Supreme Court of India ruled last month that indefinite shutdown was illegal.

=== Legal scrutiny ===
In a verdict delivered on petitions filed against the restrictions imposed in Jammu and Kashmir, the Supreme Court ordered a review of all the curbs on usage of Internet services. The court pointed out that freedom to access Internet services is a fundamental right as per Article 12 of the Indian Constitution. It also noted that Section 144 of India's Code of Criminal Procedure is not to be used for suppressing people's expression, ordering the local administration to publish every usage of that provision to enable its public scrutiny.

- On 11 December 2023, the Supreme Court of India upheld the abrogation of Articles 370 and 35A, while also directing the union government to restore the statehood "as soon as possible" for the state of Jammu and Kashmir and hold legislative assembly elections no later than September 2024.
- The Supreme Court upheld the creation of the Union Territory of Ladakh, referencing Article 3(a) read with explanation of the constitution, which permits the formation of a Union Territory by separating territory from any State.

== Reactions from the affected areas ==
=== Opposition ===
Following the bifurcation, calls in Jammu and Kashmir began for the restoration of its statehood, while Ladakh saw demands for a union territory with legislator in the following months.

Former Chief Minister of Jammu and Kashmir, Mehbooba Mufti called it the "blackest day of Indian democracy". She felt that the Indian Parliament snatched away everything from the people of Jammu and Kashmir. In a tweet on 4 August 2019, she said that the decision of Jammu and Kashmir leadership to reject two-nation theory in 1947 and align with India had backfired.

Former chief minister Omar Abdullah called the government's move on the Article 370 "unilateral and shocking". He deemed it a "total betrayal of the trust that the people of Jammu and Kashmir had reposed in India when the state acceded to it in 1947".

Asgar Ali Karbalai, former Chief Executive Councillor of Kargil's Hill Development Council, said people in Kargil considered any division of the state on the grounds of "religion, language or region" as undemocratic. Certain religious and political organisations in Kargil, including the Imam Khomeini Memorial Trust, condemned the Indian government for acting "without the consent from the people" and called for a general strike in the Kargil district.

Kashmiri politician Shah Faesal denounced the move, saying that "This is being seen as the biggest betrayal by the Indian state in last 70 years. It was not possible to reach Omar Abdullah, Mehbooba Mufti, Sajjad Gani Lone or send a message to them. In other districts, curfew is all the more strict. You can say that the entire eight-million population has been incarcerated like never before," and in an interview with The Guardian, described that the revocation of Jammu and Kashmir's special status was "an insult to the dignity of the people. My belief is that it will have immediate and long-term consequences. We will see ground mobilisation in the coming days and in the long run you will have sentiment of alienation going further and [it will] erupt. The common refrain is that everything has finished. Everything has been snatched from us. These are the common lines on every Kashmiri's lips these days. We have no choice left but to resist." Faesal was apparently detained by Indian security forces on 14 August 2019, leading to a statement by over 100 people associated with Harvard University (his alma mater) condemning the detention and calling for the release of Faesal and other Kashmiri leaders.

==== Jammu and Kashmir ====
The Jammu and Kashmir legislative assembly passed a non-binding resolution November 2024. Introduced by the Jammu and Kashmir National Conference-led government under Omar Abdullah, and supported by several mainstream political parties, including the Jammu and Kashmir People's Democratic Party, it sought the restoration of partial autonomy granted under Article 370, which was revoked by the government of India in August 2019.

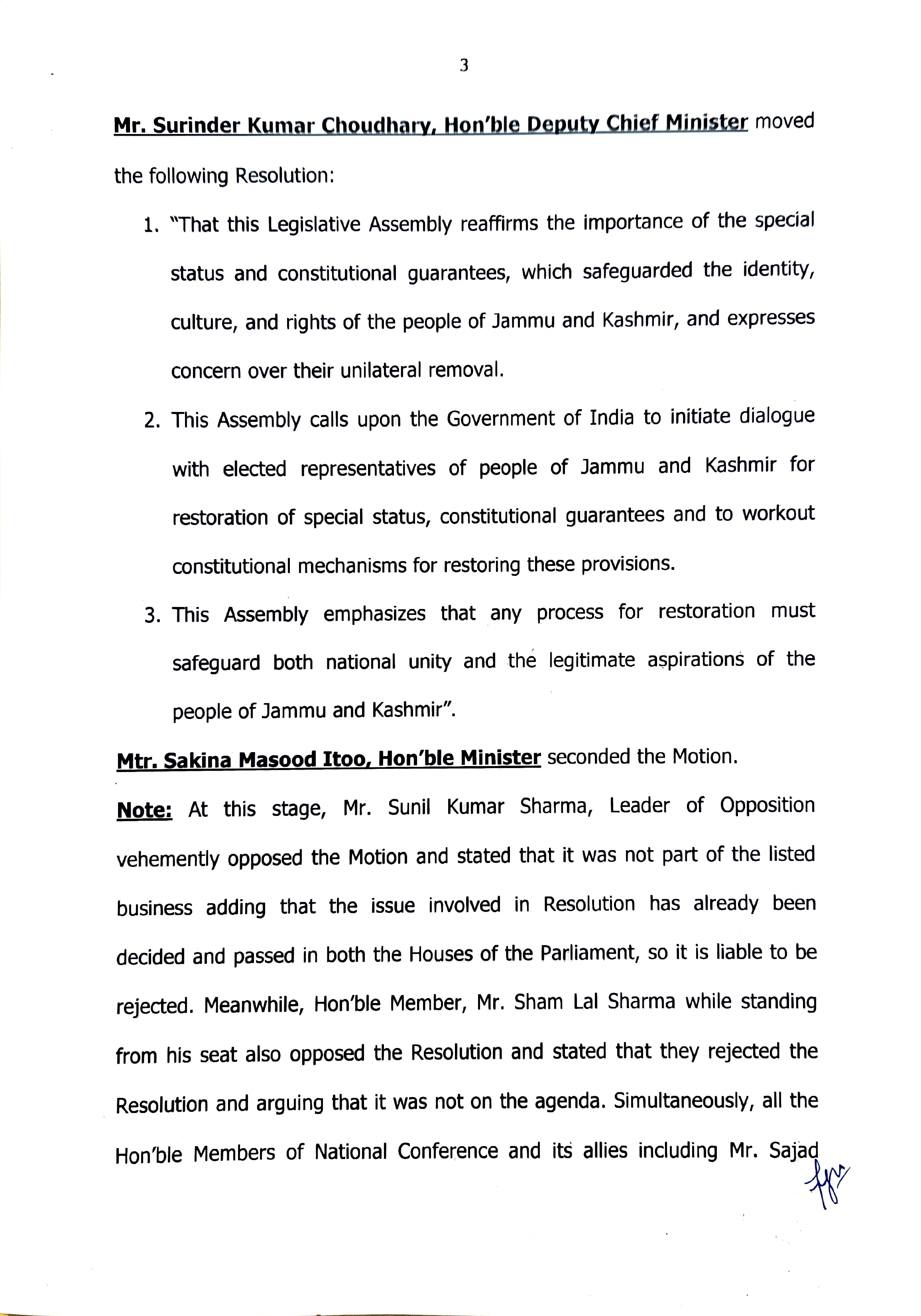
Page 3 extract from the first legislative assembly of the union territory of Jammu and Kashmir (1st Session)

The resolution, raised by Incumbent JKNC MLA DCM Mr. Surinder Kumar Choudhary, states:

1. That this Legislative Assembly reaffirms the importance of the special status and constitutional guarantees, which safeguarded the identity, culture, and rights of the people of Jammu and Kashmir, and expresses concern over their unilateral removal.

2. This Assembly calls upon the Government of India to initiate dialogue with elected representatives of the people of Jammu and Kashmir for the restoration of special status, constitutional guarantees, and to work out constitutional mechanisms for restoring these provisions.

3. This Assembly emphasizes that any process for restoration must safeguard both national unity and the legitimate aspirations of the people of Jammu and Kashmir.

The Omar-led Government initially expressed support for the restoration of statehood and passed another resolution in the J&K Cabinet to that effect. Some political observers and leaders including the Chief minister expressed hope that it would be restored within a year, but after several months without any indication from the central government, expectations of early restoration began to decline. the chief minister Omar Abdullah then launched a door-to-door signature campaign for statehood, which drew criticism from opposition parties. Following the introduction of the Jammu and Kashmir Reorganization (Amendment) Bill, 2025, commentators noted that the likelihood of statehood being restored in the near future had significantly diminished.

Support from other state and national parties were noticed they are the Congress,Janata Dal (United),DMK,Rashtriya Janata Dal,Left,Trinamool Congress, Nationalist Congress Party

==== Ladakh ====
The Ladakh Autonomous Hill Development Council, Kargil passed a resolution Engineer poncho tashi , executive councilor for tourism and Zanskar affairs, moved the resolution and councilor Syed Abas Rizvi seconded the resolution.

The four-point resolution was passed after 21 out of 26 councilors signed it the resolution read:

Page 5 extract from an RTI filed for the ADHC resolution

Page 6 extract from an RTI filed for the ADHC resolution

Resolution on Four Points

Resolution Moved By: Er. Punchok Tashi (Executive Councillor, LAHDC Kargil) Resolution Seconded By:

Syed Abass Razvi, Councillor, 05 - Tai Suru Constituency, LAHDC Kargil

Through this resolution, the house resolves that a request be made to the Government of India by LAHDC Kargil highlighting the aspirations of the general public of Kargil Ladakh for:

1. Grant of Statehood for Ladakh

2. Protection for Ladakh under the 6th Schedule of the Indian Constitution

3. Separate Lok Sabha seats for Kargil & Leh Districts

4. Establishment of "Ladakh Public Service Commission" with the Ladakh Resident Certificate as a mandatory requirement for all recruitments for Gazetted Posts in UT Ladakh.

— Er. Punchok Tashi, Resolution on Four Points, RTI DC-K--RTI-2024-441

Ladakhi leaders and organizations have consistently sought the restoration of democracy and broader constitutional safeguards. In early 2023, a delegation from Ladakh met Union Minister of State for Home Affairs, Nityanand Rai, to press demands for statehood and inclusion under the Sixth Schedule of the Constitution. Subsequent talks have continued, with the Leh Apex Body (LAB) and Kargil Democratic Alliance (KDA) leading the four-point agenda: statehood, Sixth Schedule protections, job reservations, and separate Lok Sabha constituencies. The Union government introduced several regulatory changes such as a 15-year domicile policy, expanded job reservations, multiple official languages, and seats reserved for women in hill councils, but leaders assert that the core demands of statehood and Sixth Schedule status remain unresolved. Activists including Sonam Wangchuk and civil society groups have maintained advocacy through protests, hunger strikes, and marches, drawing attention to Ladakh’s strategic importance and the erosion of autonomy since 2019. in August 2025, local bodies in Kargil launched a three-day hunger strike demanding statehood for Ladakh and its inclusion under the Sixth Schedule. These developments indicate persistent agitation for constitutional recognition, though no concrete timeline or commitment for statehood or legislative restoration has been formalized by the central government as of August 2025.

On 1 September 2025 the Leh Apex Body (LAB) and the Kargil Democratic Alliance (KDA) had a joint resolution as follows

Joint Resolution adopted by Apex Body Leh and Kargil Democratic Alliance

Dated 1st September 2025.

An important joint meeting of the Apex Body Leh and Kargil Democratic Alliance was convened on the first day of September 2025. After due consideration and mutual discussion the meeting unanimously resolved it as follows:

First: Agenda for dialogue with the Ministry of Home Affairs. The Ministry of Home Affairs shall place statehood and constitutional safeguards under Sixth Schedule as the principal agenda in the forthcoming meeting with the Apex Body Leh and Kargil Democratic Alliance.

Second: Autonomy in internal composition. That it is further resolved that the Ministry of Home Affairs shall not dictate, interfere with, or prescribe the composition of the Apex Body Leh and Kargil Democratic Alliance’s High-Powered Committee as well as sub-committees.

(Signatures: Apex Body members and Kargil Democratic Alliance.)

=== Support ===
The member of the Lok Sabha for Ladakh constituency, Jamyang Tsering Namgyal, praised the abrogation of Article 370 and the proposed formation of a separate Ladakh union territory, hoping the move will encourage jobs and development. He added "Under Kashmir, our development, our political aspiration, our identity, our language, if all of this got lost, it is because of Article 370—and the Congress party is responsible for that". Namgyal also said that the move had support from all regions of Ladakh, including Kargil.

The move to abrogate Article 370 and establish a union territory in Ladakh was welcomed by the Ladakh Buddhist Association who then organised a thanksgiving celebration in Leh to on 8 August 2019, which was attended by political and religious leaders. The Buddhist community in Leh and Ladakh stated they have been long ignored, the revocation and reorganisation will help them steer their own destiny.

Many local political parties and groups, such as the Kashmiri Hindu organisation Panun Kashmir, Jammu and Kashmir Workers Party and IkkJutt Jammu lauded the removal of Article 370 and 35A and the integration of Jammu and Kashmir.

It was reported that celebrations had taken place in Jammu with people distributing sweets, dancing and playing drums.

Representatives of the Kashmiri Hindu Community, who were displaced from the Kashmir Valley as a result of ongoing violence welcomed the move and hoped that members of their community, numbering between 300,000 and 400,000 people will be able to return.

The day of 15 August was marked by Ladakh as its 'first independence day'. Banners were put up thanking the prime minister Narendra Modi and commemorating the four youth activists who died while agitating for union territory status. Similar celebrations were also noticed in Jammu among the Gujjar Bakarwals, Sikhs, Valmikis and West Pakistan refugees, who were all victims of Srinagar's discriminatory laws. The residents of Jammu felt that Jammu was always ignored for funds and resources, and they hoped the reorganisation would bring in development. Kashmiri Pandit refugees in Jammu hoped for rehabilitation.

== Indian reactions ==
- The Union of India assured the Supreme Court that statehood would be restored to Jammu and Kashmir.
- The Union of India confirmed that the status of the Union Territory of Ladakh will not be affected by the restoration of statehood to Jammu and Kashmir.
- The Central government has engaged in talks with Ladakhi leaders and formed a high-powered committee to address their concerns. However, it has shown hesitation in granting full statehood or direct inclusion under the Sixth Schedule, sometimes offering "Sixth Schedule-like" protections instead. Talks were ongoing between both parties but collapsed after the government arrested prominent leader Sonam Wangchuk under the NSA.

=== Opposition ===
The historian Ramachandra Guha said that the President of India had apparently acted in "haste" and the revocation is an "arbitrary misuse of state power". (Note: Guha states, "when a very complex order or a proposal by the government comes to you, it's obligatory for the President to consider it, to reflect upon it, to return it, especially when it is juxtaposed by the news that the Valley is shut down, former chief ministers are placed under house arrest, and landlines and mobiles have been completely obliterated. I think the President acted in haste and unwisely".) The constitutional scholar A. G. Noorani said that the Indian government's decision to abrogate Article 370 through controversial means was "utterly and palpably unconstitutional", even fraudulent. It is headed for a "showdown in India's Supreme Court".

Nobel laureate Amartya Sen criticized the government and said that he was "not proud as an Indian". He regarded the detention of Kashmiri political leaders as "a classical colonial excuse" to prevent backlash against the Indian government's decision and called for a democratic solution that would involve Kashmiri people.

Indian novelist Arundhati Roy criticized the Indian government in her opinion piece in The New York Times.

Wajahat Habibullah said the government's decision was a "regressive and unwise" step.

The leaders of the Indian National Congress – India's main opposition party – were divided on the revocation of Article 370. Some Congress leaders such as the Chief Minister of Rajasthan Ashok Gehlot, a congress leader condemned the government's arrest of Kashmiri leaders Mehbooba Mufti and Omar Abdullah. Other leaders of Rajasthan Congress and Gehlot's cabinet welcomed the revocation. Chief Minister of Punjab Amarinder Singh, a congress leader also termed the revocation of Article 370 as "totally unconstitutional" and said "this will set a bad precedent as it would mean that the Centre could reorganise any state in the country by simply imposing President's rule." The Punjab chief minister also banned any form of celebrations or protests in his state in matters relating to Article 370, ordering increased security to some 8,000 Kashmiri students studying in Punjab.

Rahul Gandhi criticized the Indian government for arresting the Kashmiri political leaders and called the detentions "unconstitutional & undemocratic."

On 24 August, a delegation of opposition leaders had attempted to visit Jammu and Kashmir to take stock of the situation. The delegation was a 12-member team composed of Rahul Gandhi, Ghulam Nabi Azad, K. C. Venugopal, Anand Sharma, D. Raja, Sitaram Yechury, Dinesh Trivedi, Tiruchi Siva, Manoj Jha, Sharad Yadav, Majeed Memon, and D. Kupendra Reddy. However, the team was sent back upon reaching Srinagar.

Hundreds of people protested in New Delhi to protest against the Indian government decision and called it a "death of Indian democracy". The protesters asked Indian government to reconsider its decision. D. Raja, General Secretary of the Communist Party of India, called the Indian government move "an assault on Indian constitution". The Tamil Nadu-based regional Dravida Munnetra Kazhagam party leader M. K. Stalin, along with West Bengal-based All India Trinamool Congress party leader Derek O'Brien opposed the revocation. Stalin called the move as "murder of democracy", while O'Brien called it a "procedural harakiri".

The Indian National Congress party members filed two petitions in the Supreme Court of India, requesting an urgent hearing. One challenged the revocation, while the other challenged the communications blackout and curfew in Kashmir region in which approximately 500 people were arrested, including several Kashmiri leaders. The Supreme Court rejected the "urgent hearing" request, placing the petitions to its normal proceedings.

=== Support ===
The Indian Government justified its action by saying that this will help end violence and militancy in the state and enable people to access government schemes such as reservation, right to education and right to information among other schemes.

The constitutional expert Subhash C. Kashyap, according to BBC News, states that the revocation was "constitutionally sound" and that "no legal and constitutional fault can be found in it".

The revocation of Article 370 was passed by an overwhelming majority of support in the Indian parliament. It has attracted not only the support of the Hindu nationalist parties such as the BJP, but many other Indian political parties that typically oppose the BJP.

Some senior Congress leaders openly came out in support of the action. Former Indian prime minister Manmohan Singh said that the revocation had an in-principle support from the Congress party but its execution was not appropriate. Bhupinder Singh Hooda, former Chief Minister of Haryana, supported the government's decision saying that the Congress party has "lost its way". Jyotiraditya Scindia, also supported the government's action to remove article 370. He wrote on Twitter, "I support the move on #JammuAndKashmir & #Ladakh and its full integration into union of India." Similarly, Congress leader Deepender Singh Hooda contended that the abrogation of the provisions of Article 370 in Jammu and Kashmir "is in the interest of national integrity". Congress Rajya Sabha chief whip, Bhubaneswar Kalita resigned over Congress's stand on revoking special status of Jammu and Kashmir and stated that, "The ideology of Congress today looks like it is committing suicide and I do not want to be a part of it." Congress politician Janardan Dwivedi welcomed the abrogation of the provisions of Article 370 in Jammu and Kashmir, saying even though it came late, a "historical mistake" had been corrected.

The Bahujan Samaj Party and its leader Mayawati, as well as Aam Aadmi Party leader (and Chief Minister of Delhi) Arvind Kejriwal supported the revocation of Article 370. Explaining her decision to support the revocation, Mayawati stated that Article 370 and 35A had caused social, economic and political injustice in Jammu and Kashmir, and the people – including the Buddhists – will now get the long-pending benefits that was denied to them. She stated, "the Buddhist followers of Ambedkar were feeling happy".

The Telangana and Andhra Pradesh-based YSR Congress Party's parliamentary party leader V. Vijayasai Reddy supported the scrapping of Article 370 and termed the step as a "courageous and daring" step by Amit Shah. Member of Parliament from Telugu Desam Party, Kanakamedala Ravindra Kumar said, "I must congratulate the Home Minister and PM as by strong implementation of this, the people of J&K must be relieved from all this tension and live happily and become a part of the country" and welcomed the move. The Odisha-based Biju Janata Dal and Tamil Nadu-based All India Anna Dravida Munnetra Kazhagam party also supported the revocation of Jammu and Kashmir special status.

Jamiat Ulema-e-Hind, a prominent Indian Muslim organisation, supported the decision to abrogate Article 370 saying that the integration of Kashmir with India is in the interest of Kashmiri people.

Calling it a dynamic place for tourism, the MEPs who visited Kashmir also said that all protests should be against terrorism in the valley, which is mostly from people of foreign countries. During their two-day-stay, the parliamentarians also interacted with the people in the valley, and pointed towards the integration of Kashmir with the beginning of their engagement with the civil society.

== Pakistan's response ==
From 6 August onward, Pakistan responded in numerous ways. The Foreign Office issued a statement stating India's revocation was an illegal "unilateral step". Pakistan's army chief said that the Pakistan Army would "go to any extent" to support the people of Kashmir. On 7 August, an emergency joint parliamentary sitting passed a resolution to condemn India's move. A meeting of the National Security Committee decided to downgrade Pakistan's diplomatic relations with India. The Samjhauta Express train service and the Thar Express were suspended. All cultural exchanges with India were suspended, including banning the screening of Indian films and dramas inside Pakistan. On 9 August 2019, Pakistan formally suspended most of its trade relations with India. On 11 August 2019, prime minister Imran Khan compared the Indian government to "Nazis", warning that global inaction over Kashmir would be same as "appeasing Hitler". He accused that India was attempting to change the demography of the Muslim majority Kashmir through ethnic cleansing. Pakistan's foreign minister Shah Mehmood Qureshi issued a statement on Tuesday 13 August 2019 that he had written a letter to the president of the United Nations Security Council with a request to convene an emergency meeting of the council to discuss India's "illegal actions that violate UN resolutions on Kashmir". The foreign minister also called for circulation of the letter among members of the Security Council. On 20 August 2019, Pakistan announced that it will take the dispute to the International Court of Justice, adding that its case would centre on alleged human rights violations by India.

In 2019, all public transport links between the two countries were severed because of Pakistani protests. This included the suspension of the Delhi-Lahore Bus, Poonch–Rawalakot Bus and Srinagar–Muzaffarabad Bus services. The only way for travelers to make this journey is to cross on foot at Wagah.

On 4 August 2020, Pakistan's government released an updated political map which included Pakistan's territorial claims on Jammu and Kashmir, Ladakh, the Siachen Glacier, the eastern banks of Sir Creek, as well as Junagadh and Manavadar in India's Gujarat region. The map also annotated Ladakh's boundary with China as "frontier undefined", whose status would be formalised by "the sovereign authorities concerned after the settlement of the Jammu and Kashmir dispute." The map was adopted for official use throughout Pakistan. The government renamed the Kashmir Highway, which runs through Islamabad, as Srinagar Highway. On the occasion of the one-year anniversary of the revocation of Kashmir's special status, Pakistan also observed 5 August 2020 as Youm-e-Istehsal ("Day of Exploitation") nationally. Rallies and seminars were arranged to express solidarity with Kashmiris.

== China's response ==
Foreign Ministry spokeswoman Hua Chunying opposed the integration of the Ladakh Union Territory into India's administrative jurisdiction, saying "it undermined China's territorial sovereignty" she went on to say: "India's action is unacceptable and would not have any legal effect," regarding disputed territory on the China–India border. Regarding Kashmir in general, Hua affirmed that "the Kashmir issue is an issue left from the past between India and Pakistan". On 9 August, Chinese Foreign Minister Wang Yi after meeting with Pakistani Foreign Minister Shah Mahmood Qureshi said that China is "seriously concerned about the turbulence and escalating tensions" in Kashmir, and that "China will continue to firmly support the Pakistan side in safeguarding its legitimate rights."

On 12 June 2020, a report said that Chinese think-tanks have linked the tensions along the Line of Actual Control (LAC) between India and China with Article 370.

== Demonstrations ==
=== Kashmir Valley ===
On 9 August, according to a Reuters report, over 10,000 people protested in Srinagar against the Indian government's decision to revoke Article 370, with some protesters pelting stones at government security personnel. In response, Indian police used tear gas and pellets against the protesters to disperse them. According to Al Jazeera, it has been receiving information from Srinagar residents via satellite phones and Wi-Fi available in the Kashmir region. They have reported protests on Friday. Clashes were occurring between the protesters and Indian forces, accompanied with pellet gun attack and the firing of tear gas shells by the Indian Forces.Some report that the pellet gun attacks have severely wounded and lacerated civilians.

The Indian government called the Reuters report "completely fabricated and incorrect", but acknowledged that after the Friday mosque prayers, there were "a few stray protests in Srinagar/Baramulla and none involved a crowd of more than 20 people". The Wire said that the visuals published by BBC belie the Government reports.

According to the BBC, it witnessed the police opening gunfire and using tear gas to disperse a crowd in Srinagar after Friday prayers on 9 August 2019. This witness report contradicts the Indian government statement that the "protest never took place". On 11 August, the Jammu and Kashmir director general of police, Dilbag Singh told Reuters, "between 1,000 and 1,500 people were returning from praying at mosques on Friday when 'some miscreants' started pelting stones at security officials", and in a reaction to the stone-pelting, rounds of pump-action gun was fired that caused injuries to a few people. According to Reuters, hundreds of people protested in Srinagar on 11 August, after authorities had eased restrictions in the city over the weekend to allow people to buy groceries, medicines and prepare for the Islamic festival of Eid al-Adha.

=== Jammu and Ladakh regions ===
According to India Today, in the Hindu majority Jammu region, people held widespread "massive celebratory" demonstrations over several days with the distribution of sweets, bursting of firecrackers and dancing. In Ladakh, the Buddhist organizations celebrated the removal of Article 370 provisions and making the Ladakh region a separate Union Territory. The people in Leh and Matho celebrated 15 August as a day of "independence from Kashmir" and welcomed their Union Territory status.

In the Kargil region with a Muslim majority, there were protests against the Indian government's move to make it a union territory.

== Social media, activism and misinformation ==
Several human rights activists and world leaders also commented on the situation in Kashmir on their social media accounts . On Twitter, hashtags such as #KashmirBleeds became trending topics .

According to India Today and other Indian media sources, several images and videos alleged to be fabricated appeared on social media such as Facebook, Twitter and other platforms. A closer examination of these photos and videos established that these are fabricated propaganda that used old photographs or videos and the posts presented them as depicting the "current situation in Kashmir".

According to Dawn, a Pakistan-based newspaper, the Kashmir blackout has led to an "online misinformation war". The Nation, in its editorial said, "The lack of coverage in Kashmir has increased the likelihood of misinformation and panic being spread, all of which puts the lives of Kashmiris in danger and uncertainty."

The Indian Home Ministry alleged that "several Pakistani handles are spreading fake news", and asked Twitter to block a list of accounts. Separately, the Jammu and Kashmir superintendent of police has demanded Twitter to block an account that allegedly is spreading rumors. The demand letter states that such rumours harm the law and order situation and is a "threat to lives". They allege that the platform is posting "objectionable and malicious" content. Twitter has blocked four of these accounts, and its officials stated that they are reviewing some others. This included the Twitter account of Syed Ali Shah Geelani who is a Kashmiri separatist Hurriyat leader.

Indian government accused the BBC and Reuters of lying and fabricating news about large scale protests in Kashmir. According to India Today, the authenticity of the BBC video about the protest has been questioned because it is an edited combination of a series of clips and it shows an absence of police and security personnel almost everywhere the edited video, even though Kashmir was under a lockdown with heavy security deployment on 9 August 2019 – the day the video was recorded and posted by the BBC. According to India Today, a portion of the video is authentically from Dullbagh Road in Srinagar, but it is unclear if it is a fresh video or an old video clip inserted in. Some Indians allege that parts of this video are from Pakistan-administered Kashmir.

== Impact ==
Impact of the Revocation of the special status of Jammu and Kashmir encompassed a year without high-speed Internet, changes in the politics and bureaucracy of the region, priority of counter-insurgency & counter-terrorism operations, new domicile rules, talks of restoration of statehood, judicial lethargy, and decline in stone-pelting among other things.

Local governance was enhanced as the 73rd and 74th amendments to the Indian Constitution became applicable to the state.

Right to Education became implemented. Its implementation was previously obstructed.

As per figures collected from Kashmir tourism department, the number of tourist footfall reached its highest level 180,000 in March 2022 ( following the abrogation of Article 370), This marked a record high in the preceding 10 years. . The opposition has accused the government of inflating tourism numbers in Jammu & Kashmir by including Amarnath Yatris and Vaishno Devi pilgrims in the statistics. Previously, these religious pilgrims were not classified as tourists, as their visits were solely for religious purposes and contributed little to the local tourism economy. Opposition leaders, such as Omar Abdullah, argue that the government is now counting these pilgrims to artificially boost tourism figures, projecting an inflated picture of economic growth in the region.

In 2026, US Ambassador to India Sergio Gor, during his first visit to Jammu and Kashmir since revocation of article 370, described J&K as an important part of India. He held discussions with Chief Minister Omar Abdullah on strengthening US-India relations and increasing engagement with Jammu and Kashmir. Gor praised the improved security situation in the Valley and indicated that the US may reconsider its travel advisory for the region.

== See also ==
- Rape in Kashmir conflict
- Human rights abuses in Kashmir
- List of massacres in Jammu and Kashmir
- Exodus of Kashmiri Hindus
- Incorporation of Azad Kashmir as nominally self-governing state of Pakistan
- Jammu and Kashmir Reorganisation Act, 2019
- Karachi Agreement (Azad Kashmir)
- Pakistan and state-sponsored terrorism
- Panun Kashmir
- Women's rights in Jammu and Kashmir

== Bibliography ==
- Cottrell, Jill (2013). "Kashmir: The vanishing autonomy". In Ghai, Yash; Woodman, Sophia (eds.). Practising Self-Government: A Comparative Study of Autonomous Regions. Cambridge University Press. pp. 163–199. doi:10.1017/CBO9781139088206.006. ISBN 978-1-107-29235-2.
- "Declaration Under Article 370(3) of the Constitution, "C.O. 273"" (PDF). The Gazette of India. No. 453. 6 August 2019.
- Kumar, Ashutosh (2005). "The Constitutional and Legal Routes". In Samaddar, Ranabir (ed.). The Politics of Autonomy: Indian Experiences. SAGE Publications. pp. 93–113. ISBN 9780761934530.
- Noorani, A. G. (2011). Article 370: A Constitutional History of Jammu and Kashmir. Oxford University Press. ISBN 978-0-19-807408-3.
- Tillin, Louise (2016). "Asymmetric Federalism". In Choudhry, Sujit; Khosla, Madhav; Pratap Bhanu Mehta (eds.). The Oxford Handbook of the Indian Constitution. Oxford University Press. pp. 546–. ISBN 978-0-19-870489-8.
