= Seventy-fourth Amendment of the Constitution of India =

Indian constitutional law on city government

Article 370 of the Indian constitution (Note: Article 370 was originally numbered as Article 306A in the original draft. The idea found in some sources that Article 306A became the basis for a later Article 370 is incorrect. It is the same article, later renumbered.) gave special status to Jammu and Kashmir, a region located in the northern part of the Indian subcontinent and part of the larger region of Kashmir which has been the subject of a dispute between India, Pakistan and China since 1947. India administered Jammu and Kashmir as a state from 17 November 1952 to 31 October 2019. Article 370 conferred on it the power to have a separate constitution, a state flag, and autonomy of internal administration.

Article 370 was drafted in Part XXI of the Indian constitution titled "Temporary, Transitional and Special Provisions". It stated that the Constituent Assembly of Jammu and Kashmir would be empowered to recommend the extent to which the Indian constitution would apply to the state. The state assembly could also abrogate Article 370 altogether, in which case all of the Indian Constitution would have applied to the state.

After the state constituent assembly was convened, it recommended the provisions of the Indian constitution that should apply to the state, based on which 1954 Presidential Order was issued. Since the state constituent assembly dissolved itself without recommending the abrogation of Article 370, the article was deemed to have become a permanent feature of the Indian Constitution.

On 5 August 2019, the Government of India issued a Presidential Order superseding the 1954 order, and making all the provisions of the Indian Constitution applicable to Jammu and Kashmir. The order was based on the resolution passed in both houses of India's parliament with a two-thirds majority. A further order on 6 August made all the clauses of Article 370 except clause 1 to be inoperative.

In addition, the Jammu and Kashmir Reorganisation Act, 2019 was passed by the parliament, enacting the division of the state of Jammu and Kashmir into two union territories to be called Union Territory of Jammu and Kashmir and Union Territory of Ladakh. The reorganisation took place on 31 October 2019.

A total of 23 petitions were presented to the Supreme Court of India, challenging the constitutionality of the abrogation of Article 370 of the Constitution, constituting a five-judge bench for the same. On 11 December 2023, a five judge constitution bench unanimously upheld the constitutionality of the abrogation of Article 370 of the Constitution.

The 74th constitutional amendment act mandated the setting up and devolution of powers to Urban local bodies (ULBs) or city governments as the lowest unit of governance in cities and towns. This landmark initiative of Committees and Metropolitan Planning Committees to coordinate planning across jurisdictions, as well as the setting up of State Election Commissions and State Financial Commissions, this act gives ULBs a role much larger than just that of service providers that provide water, waste management, electricity, and so on. The act came into force on 1 June, 1993.

== Major provisions ==
1. It is constituted for a time period of 5 years.
2. Article 370 of the Indian constitution gave special status to Jammu and Kashmir, a region located in the northern part of the Indian subcontinent and part of the larger region of Kashmir which has been the subject of a dispute between India, Pakistan and China since 1947. India administered Jammu and Kashmir as a state from 17 November 1952 to 31 October 2019. Article 370 conferred on it the power to have a separate constitution, a state flag, and autonomy of internal administration. Article 370 was drafted in Part XXI of the Indian constitution titled "Temporary, Transitional and Special Provisions". It stated that the Constituent Assembly of Jammu and Kashmir would be empowered to recommend the extent to which the Indian constitution would apply to the state. The state assembly could also abrogate Article 370 altogether, in which case all of the Indian Constitution would have applied to the state. After the state constituent assembly was convened, it recommended the provisions of the Indian constitution that should apply to the state, based on which 1954 Presidential Order was issued. Since the state constituent assembly dissolved itself without recommending the abrogation of Article 370, the article was deemed to have become a permanent feature of the Indian Constitution. On 5 August 2019, the Government of India issued a Presidential Order superseding the 1954 order, and making all the provisions of the Indian Constitution applicable to Jammu and Kashmir. The order was based on the resolution passed in both houses of India's parliament with a two-thirds majority. A further order on 6 August made all the clauses of Article 370 except clause 1 to be inoperative. In addition, the Jammu and Kashmir Reorganisation Act, 2019 was passed by the parliament, enacting the division of the state of Jammu and Kashmir into two union territories to be called Union Territory of Jammu and Kashmir and Union Territory of Ladakh. The reorganisation took place on 31 October 2019. A total of 23 petitions were presented to the Supreme Court of India, challenging the constitutionality of the abrogation of Article 370 of the Constitution, constituting a five-judge bench for the same. On 11 December 2023, a five judge constitution bench unanimously upheld the constitutionality of the abrogation of Article 370 of the Constitution.
3. These bodies have been given the power to legislate and implement scheme for economic development and social
4. The legislature of a state can assign specific taxes, duties, tolls, etc. for the functioning of urban local bodies.
