= Article 35A of the Constitution of India =

Former constitutional law regarding Jammu and Kashmir

Article 35A of the Indian Constitution was an article that empowered the Jammu and Kashmir state's legislature to define "permanent residents" of the state and provide special rights and privileges to them. It was added to the Constitution through a presidential order, i.e., The Constitution (Application to Jammu and Kashmir) Order, 1954 – issued by the President of India under Article 370. Under the state's separate constitution, which is now defunct, permanent residents could purchase land and immovable property, vote and contest state elections, seek government employment and avail themselves of other state benefits such as higher education and health care. Non-permanent residents of the state, even if Indian citizens, were not entitled to these 'privileges'.

The provisions facilitated by the Article 35A and the state's permanent resident laws were criticised over the years for their discriminatory nature, including the hardships imposed on immigrant workers, refugees from West Pakistan, and the State's own female residents, who could lose their permanent resident status by marrying out of state.

On 5 August 2019, the President of India Ram Nath Kovind issued a new Presidential Order, whereby all the provisions of the Indian Constitution were made to apply to the State without any special provisions. This implied that the State's separate Constitution stood inoperative, including the privileges granted by the Article 35A.

== Background ==
Prior to 1947, Jammu and Kashmir was a princely state under the British Paramountcy. The people of the princely states were "state subjects", not British colonial subjects. In the case of Jammu and Kashmir, the political movements in the state in the early 20th century led to the emergence of "hereditary state subject" as a political identity for the State's people. In particular, the Pandit community had launched a "Kashmir for the Kashmiris" movement demanding that only Kashmiris should be employed in state government jobs. Legal provisions for the recognition of the status were enacted by the Maharaja of Jammu and Kashmir between 1912 and 1932. The 1927 Hereditary State Subject Order granted to the state subjects the right to government office and the right to land use and ownership, which were not available to non-state subjects.

Following the accession of Jammu and Kashmir to the Indian Union on 26 October 1947, The Maharaja ceded control over defence, external affairs and communications (the "ceded subjects") to the Government of India. The Article 370 of the Constitution of India and the concomitant Constitutional Order of 1950 formalised this relationship. Discussions for furthering the relationship between the State and the Union continued, culminating in the 1952 Delhi Agreement, whereby the governments of the State and the Union agreed that Indian citizenship would be extended to all the residents of the state but the state would be empowered to legislate over the rights and privileges of the state subjects, who would now be called permanent residents.

In a statement to the Lok Sabha on the Delhi agreement, the Indian prime minister Jawaharlal Nehru explained:

The question of citizenship arose obviously. Full citizenship applies there. But our friends from Kashmir were very apprehensive about one or two matters. For a long time past, in the Maharaja's time, there had been laws there preventing any outsider, that is, any person from outside Kashmir, from acquiring or holding land in Kashmir. If I mention it, in the old days the Maharaja was very much afraid of a large number of Englishmen coming and settling down there, because the climate is delectable, and acquiring property. So although most of their rights were taken away from the Maharaja under the British rule, the Maharaja stuck to this that nobody from outside should acquire land there. And that continues. So the present Government of Kashmir is very anxious to preserve that right because they are afraid, and I think rightly afraid, that Kashmir would be overrun by people whose sole qualification might be the possession of too much money and nothing else, who might buy up, and get the delectable places. Now they want to vary the old Maharaja's laws to liberalise it, but nevertheless to have checks on the acquisition of lands by persons from outside. However, we agree that this should be cleared up. The old state's subjects definition gave certain privileges regarding this acquisition of land, the services, and other minor things, I think, State scholarships and the rest.

So, we agreed and noted this down: 'The State legislature shall have power to define and regulate the rights and privileges of the permanent residents of the State, more especially in regard to the acquisition of immovable property, appointments to services and like matters. Till then the existing State law should apply.'

Following the adoption of the provisions of the Delhi Agreement by the Constituent Assembly of Jammu and Kashmir, the President of India issued The Constitution (Application to Jammu and Kashmir) Order, 1954, through which Indian citizenship was extended to the residents of the state, and simultaneously the Article 35A was inserted into the Indian constitution enabling the State legislature to define the privileges of the permanent residents.

== Text ==
"Saving of laws with respect to permanent residents and their rights. — Notwithstanding anything contained in this Constitution, no existing law in force in the State of Jammu and Kashmir, and no law hereafter enacted by the Legislature of the State:

(a) defining the classes of persons who are, or shall be, permanent residents of the State of Jammu and Kashmir; or

(b) conferring on such permanent residents any special rights and privileges or imposing upon other persons any restrictions as respects—

(i) employment under the State Government;
(ii) acquisition of immovable property in the State;
(iii) settlement in the State; or
(iv) right to scholarships and such other forms of aid as the State Government may provide,

shall be void on the ground that it is inconsistent with or takes away or abridges any rights conferred on the other citizens of India by any provision of this part."

== Enactment ==
The Constitution (Application to Jammu and Kashmir) Order, 1954 was issued by President Rajendra Prasad under Article 370, with the advice of the Union Government headed by Jawaharlal Nehru. It was enacted as a subsequent to the '1952 Delhi agreement', reached between Nehru and the then Prime Minister of Jammu and Kashmir Sheikh Abdullah, which dealt with the extension of Indian citizenship to the Jammu and Kashmir "state subjects".

The state was empowered, both in the Instrument of Accession and the Article 370, to decree exceptions to any extension of the Indian Constitution to the state, other than in the matter of ceded subjects. So Article 35A was seen as an exception authorised by the Article 370, clause(1)(d).

Bakshi Ghulam Mohammad of the Jammu and Kashmir National Conference was the Prime Minister of Jammu and Kashmir at the time of the 1954 Presidential order.

As the Article 35A was added to the Constitution by the executive head without any discussion in the Parliament, questions have been raised about the manner of its enactment.

== Permanent Residents ==
The Jammu and Kashmir Constitution, which was adopted by the Jammu and Kashmir Constituent Assembly on 17 November 1956, defined a Permanent Resident (PR) of the state as a person who was a state subject on 14 May 1954, or who had been a resident of the state for 10 years, and had "lawfully acquired immovable property in the state". The Jammu and Kashmir state legislature could alter the definition of permanent residents or modify the privileges applicable to them through a law passed with two-thirds majority.

The State Constituent Assembly incorporated these discriminatory provisions under Section 51 (Qualifications for membership of the Legislature – "A person shall not be qualified to be chosen to fill a seat in the Legislature unless he is a Permanent Resident of the State"), Section 127 (Transitional provisions – "Until other provision is made in this behalf under this Constitution, all the laws in force immediately before the commencement of this Constitution and applicable to any public service or any post which continues to exist after the commencement of this Constitution, as service or post under the State, shall continue in force so far-as consistent with the provisions of this Constitution") and Section 140 ("The elections to the Legislative Assembly shall be on the basis of adult suffrage; that is to say, every person who is a permanent resident of the State and who is not less than Eighteen years of age on such date ..."), etc.

As a result of these provisions, no person who was not a Permanent Resident of Jammu and Kashmir could own property in Jammu and Kashmir, obtain a job in the Jammu and Kashmir Government, join any professional college run by government of Jammu and Kashmir, or get any form of government aid from government funds.

== Revocation of special status ==
On 5 August 2019, the Union Government revoked the special status granted to Jammu and Kashmir under the Article 370 through a Presidential Order, and made the entire Constitution of India applicable to the state. This implied that the Article 35A stood abolished. Further, the Union Parliament passed legislation reorganising the state into two union territories, one being Jammu and Kashmir, the other Ladakh. However, Jammu and Kashmir was provided with a legislature, and, according to the Solicitor General, was "still a State for all purposes". Only the police powers were retained by the President.

The abolition of Article 35A was indirect. Since the Article was brought into being via the Presidential Order of 1954, which was now superseded by a new Presidential Order, Article 35A stood deleted from the Constitution. The special rights and privileges previously enjoyed by the residents of Jammu and Kashmir were nullified, and they became "equal citizens of India". Non-residents gained the fundamental rights (provided by the Indian constitution) with respect to Jammu and Kashmir, such as "the right to equal opportunity of State employment, right to acquire property and the right to settle in Jammu and Kashmir".

The Jammu and Kashmir Reorganisation Act, passed around the same time as the revocation of the special status, stated that, out of the 330 state laws and governor's acts, 164 would continue to operate, 166 would be repealed, and seven would be amended. Since Article 35A, on the basis of which state obtained the power to define permanent residents and their privileges, has now been deleted, references to "permanent residents" in the state laws were either removed or replaced by other criteria.

=== Domicile status ===
Among the laws amended in Jammu and Kashmir Reorganisation (Adaptation of State Laws) Order, 2020, is the Jammu and Kashmir Civil Services (Decentralization and Recruitment) Act 2010. References to "permanent resident of the State" in the Act were substituted by the new concept of "domicile" in the union territory. (Note: According to the Supreme Court of India, the term "domicile" is mistakenly applied by the state governments in India to denote "permanent residence". The Court stated that there is only one domicile in India in the legal sense, representing the entire country.)

According to the order any person who has stayed in Jammu and Kashmir for 15 years or has studied for a period of seven years and appeared in Class 10th/12th examination in the territory will be deemed to have domicile in Jammu and Kashmir. Children of central government officials and others who have served in Jammu and Kashmir for a period of 10 years and their children also have domicile status. A person registered as a migrant by the Relief and Rehabilitation Commissioner (Migrants) can also apply for domicile status.

Text of the order:

Domicile for purposes of appointment to any service in Union territory of Jammu and Kashmir.

―3A. (1) Any person who fulfils the following conditions shall be deemed to be a domicile of the Union territory of Jammu and Kashmir for the purposes of appointment to any post carrying a pay scale of not more than Level-4 (25500) under the Union territory of Jammu and Kashmir or under a local or other authority (other than cantonment board) within the Union territory of Jammu and Kashmir:-
(a) who has resided for a period of fifteen years in the Union territory of Jammu and Kashmir or has studied for a period of seven years and appeared in Class 10th /12th examination in an educational institution located in the Union territory of Jammu and Kashmir; or [...]

In the original Order of 31 March, only subordinate posts in the Jammu and Kashmir government were reserved for domiciled residents. The higher level posts were made available to outsiders. Following protests and criticism, a Second Order was issued on 3 April 2020, reserving all posts of Jammu and Kashmir to domiciled residents.

According to a legal scholar that studied the domicile law, the requirements for domicile status laid out in these amendments are broadly similar to the domicile laws in use in other states. (Note: He notes that all such states have a residency requirement, but the required period of stay varies. Karnataka requires 6 years of continuous stay in the state, Maharashtra requires 15 years, Jharkhand requires 30 years, and Himachal Pradesh requires 20 years.) He notes that one notable difference is that the children of employees are not required to have studied in the state to obtain domicile status, whereas other states have such a requirement.

=== Implementation ===
In May 2020, procedures for issuing domicile certificates were formulated in the form of Jammu and Kashmir Grant of Domicile Certificate (Procedure) Rules 2020. A tehsildar (sub-district revenue official) was authorised to issue domicile certificates for qualified applicants. The rules also said that the official was required to issue certificates within 15 days, failing which the official would be penalised. Experts opined that the rules appeared intended to bypass the byzantine bureaucracy that the old residence permit procedures suffered from. It was further decided that spouses of individuals that had domicile status would also get domicile status, and that domicile certificates would replace permanent residence certificates for entry to educational institutions.

People who already had a permanent residence certificate could exchange it for a domicile certificate. West Pakistan refugees, Valmiki and Gorkha community members who had settled in the state could also obtain domicile certificates if they met the requirements. By September 2020, it was revealed that 125,000 domicile certificates had been issued, of which 99 percent were for former permanent residence holders. They also included about 11,000 West Pakistan refugees, 415 Valimikis, 10 Gorkhas, 12,340 registered migrants (mainly Pandit community members that left the state during the Kashmir insurgency). (Note: A year later, in August 2021, it was announced that 410,000 domicile certificates had been issued, of which about 56,000 were West Pakistan refugees, 2,700 were Valmikis and 790 were Gorkhas.) All such people were branded as "outsiders" or "non-locals" by the Kashmiris. In April 2025, in response to a starred question in the Jammu and Kashmir Legislative Assembly, the government revealed that 3.5 million domicile certificates had been issued in the previous two years, of which 83,742 (2.38 percent) were for those "who did not earlier qualify as permanent residents". Despite government's careful wording, it invited a comment from opposition leader Mehbooba Mufti that no other state would issue such certificates to "so many non-locals" in such a short time. There are believed to be 150,000 to 200,000 West Pakistan refugees, Valmikis and Gorkhas living in the state who didn't qualify as permanent residents.

=== Amendments to land laws ===
The Adaptation of State Laws order also removed references to "permanent residents" in the land laws of Jammu and Kashmir, with the effect that all Indian citizens as well as investors became qualified to purchase land in the territory. No domicile requirement was specified for the purchase of land. Agricultural land was however protected by limiting its transfer to only agriculturists. These provisions are similar to those in place for Himachal Pradesh.

=== Voting rights ===
With the abolition of the permanent resident restrictions, all Indian citizens living in Jammu and Kashmir are able to vote in state and local elections. The Chief Election Officer said that this was in accordance with the Representation of the People Act, 1951. He expected 2 to 2.5 million new voters for the upcoming Legislative Assembly election, causing an uproar. But in the event, there were only 93,000 new voters. (Note: In the "Special Summary Revision" in 2022, 772,000 new voters were found, who reduced to further to 231,000 in the "final electoral roll". After a summary revision of "photo electoral rolls" the number reduced further to 93,000. It is unclear why the early figures were too high.) In 2024, the West Pakistan refugees, Valmikis and Gorkhas voted for the first time since their first settlement in the Jammu region 77 years earlier.

== See also ==
- Article 370 of the Constitution of India
- Constitution of Jammu and Kashmir
- Instrument of Accession (Jammu and Kashmir)
- Kashmir conflict
- Political integration of India

== Bibliography ==
- Constantin, Sergiu; Kössler, Karl (2014), "Jammu and Kashmir: A case of eroded autonomy", in Levente Salat; Sergiu Constantin; Alexander Osipov; István Gergo Székely (eds.), Autonomy Arrangements around the World: A Collection of Well and Lesser Known Cases, Romanian Institute for Research on National Minorities, pp. 113–156, ISBN 978-606-8377-30-8
- Cottrell, Jill (2013), "Kashmir: The vanishing autonomy", in Yash Ghai; Sophia Woodman (eds.), Practising Self-Government: A Comparative Study of Autonomous Regions, Cambridge University Press, pp. 163–199, doi:10.1017/CBO9781139088206.006, ISBN 978-1-107-29235-2
- Das Gupta, Jyoti Bhusan (2012) [1968], Jammu and Kashmir, Springer, ISBN 978-94-011-9231-6
- Hawaldar, Aditya (2020), "Analysis of Jammu and Kashmir Domicile Law", Supremo Amicus, 19, ISSN 2456-9704
- Noorani, A. G. (2011), Article 370: A Constitutional History of Jammu and Kashmir, Oxford University Press, ISBN 978-0-19-807408-3
- Robinson, Cabeiri deBergh (2013), Body of Victim, Body of Warrior: Refugee Families and the Making of Kashmiri Jihadists, University of California Press, ISBN 978-0-520-27421-1
