= Constitution of Jammu and Kashmir =

Constitution of the Indian state of Jammu and Kashmir in force between 1957–2019

The Constitution of Jammu and Kashmir was the constitution which established the framework for the state government of the Indian state of Jammu and Kashmir. The constitution was adopted on 17 November 1956, and came into effect on 26 January 1957. It was rendered infructuous on 5 August 2019 by an order signed by the President of India and ceased to be applicable on that date. It also included the present union territory of Ladakh.

The Constitution of India granted special status to Jammu and Kashmir among Indian states, and it was the only state in India to have a separate constitution. Article 370 of the Constitution of India stated that Parliament of India and the Union government jurisdiction extends over limited matters with respect to State of Jammu and Kashmir, and in all other matters not specifically vested in central government, actions have to be supported by state legislature. Also, unlike other states, residual powers were vested with the state government. Because of these constitutional provisions, the State of Jammu and Kashmir enjoyed a special but temporary autonomous status as mentioned in Part XXI of the Constitution of India. Among notable and visible differences with other states, till 1965, the head of state in Jammu and Kashmir was called Sadr-i-Riyasat (Head of State) whereas in other state, the title was Governor, and the head of government was called Prime Minister in place of Chief Minister in other states.

On 5 August 2019, the President of India issued a presidential order called The Constitution (Application to Jammu and Kashmir) Order, 2019 (C.O. 272) under Article 370 making all the provisions of Constitution of India applicable to the State of Jammu and Kashmir and this has rendered the Constitution of Jammu and Kashmir infructuous from that date. Now the Constitution of India is applicable to Jammu and Kashmir, like all other states and union territories of India.

== Historical aspect ==
India gained its independence from the United Kingdom on midnight of 15 August 1947, and simultaneously Pakistan was created as a new country as a result of the partition of India. Jammu and Kashmir, then a princely state under suzerainty of British Monarch, and ruled by Maharaja Hari Singh who declared independence and was not in favour of his state's accession to either of the two dominions at the time of independence (as that was an option under the Indian Independence Act, 1947). Maharaja Hari Singh communicated a standstill agreement to the governments of Pakistan and India, but no formal agreement was signed. On 6 October 1947, Pashto tribes, supported by the government of Pakistan, infiltrated the state, overwhelming the Maharaja's state army. Seeing signs of military collapse, the Maharaja requested military assistance from the Republic of India, and on 26 October 1947, signed the Instrument of accession formally incorporating the Princely State into the Union of India.

The Instrument of Accession (IoA) gave only limited powers to the Government of India, only about the three subject matters of Foreign affairs, Defence and Communications. It was similar to several hundred others IoA signed between the Government of India and other princely states. Whereas the other states later signed merger agreements, the relationship of Jammu and Kashmir with the Union of India was governed by special circumstances. In view of them, the Article 370 was incorporated in the Constitution. The Constitution of Jammu and Kashmir Maharaja (later Sadr-e-Riyasat) Dr. Karan Singh had never signed into law.

== Salient features ==
As of 2002, 29 amendments were made to the Constitution. The Constitution, as of 2002, had 158 articles divided into 13 parts and 7 schedules. The divisions of articles is as follows. The numbers in braces after show the articles included in a particular part.

- Part I: Preliminary (1–2)
- Part II: The State government(3–5)
- Part III: Permanent Residents (6–10)
- Part IV: Directive Principles of State Policy (11–25)
- Part V: The Executive (26–45)
  - The Governor (26–34)
  - The Council of Ministers (35–41)
  - The Advocate General (42)
  - Conduct of Government Business (43–45)
- Part VI: The State Legislature (46–92)
  - Composition of the State Legislature (46–50)
  - General Provisions (51–56)
  - Officers of the State Legislature (57–63)
  - Conduct of Business (64–67)
  - Disqualification of Members (68–71)
  - Powers, Privileges and Immunities of the State Legislature and Its members (72–73)
  - Legislative Procedure (74–78)
  - Procedure In Financial Matters (79–84)
  - Procedure Generally (85–90)
  - Legislative power of the Governor (91)
  - Breakdown of Constitutional Machinery (92)
- Part VII The High Court (93–113)
  - Subordinate Courts (109–113)
- Part VIII: Finance, Property and Contracts (114–123)
- Part IX: The Public Services (124–137)
  - The Public Service Commission (128–137)
- Part X: Elections (138–142)
- Part XI: Miscellaneous Provisions (143–146)
- Part XII: Amendment of the Constitution (147)
- Part XIII: Transmonal Issues (153–158)

Articles 148 to 152 have been omitted in Part XIII.

Schedules:

- Schedule I: Omitted (Repealed)
- Schedule II: Emoluments, Allowances and Privileges of the Governor
- Schedule III: Salaries and allowances of the Speaker and Deputy Speaker of the Legislative Assembly and the chairman and the Deputy Chairman of the Legislative Council
- Schedule IV: Salaries, allowances and other conditions of service of the Judges of the High Court.
- Schedule V: Forms of Oaths or affirmations
- Schedule VI: Regional Languages
- Schedule VII: Provision as to disqualification on ground of defections

Although India has a unitary citizenship, Constitution of Jammu & Kashmir defines a concept of Permanent Residency, in Part III. Hurriyat often spread lies on the concept of Permanent Residency and falsely claims that the people of J&K enjoys dual citizenship. However, the stand of Supreme court is very clear and to put in its words-

“We may also add that permanent residents of Jammu & Kashmir are citizens of India, and there is no dual citizenship as is contemplated by some other federal Constitutions in other parts of the world.”

--Supreme Court of India.

== Preamble ==
Preamble to the Constitution of Jammu and Kashmir is as quoted below.

"WE, THE PEOPLE OF THE STATE OF JAMMU AND KASHMIR,

having solemnly resolved, in pursuance of the accession of this State to India which took place on the twenty sixth day of October, 1947, to further define the existing relationship of the State with the Union of India as an integral part thereof, and to secure to ourselves-

JUSTICE, social, economic and political;

LIBERTY of thought, expression, belief, faith and worship;

EQUALITY of status and of opportunity; and to promote among us all;

FRATERNITY assuring the dignity of the individual and the unity of the nation;

IN OUR CONSTITUENT ASSEMBLY this seventeenth day of November, 1956, do HEREBY ADOPT, ENACT AND GIVE

TO OURSELVES THIS CONSTITUTION."

— Preamble of Constitution of Jammu & Kashmir.

The preamble resembles almost verbatim to the Preamble to the Constitution of India.

== Jurisdiction of Parliament ==
Under Part XXI of the Constitution of India, which deals with "Temporary, Transitional and Special provisions", the State of Jammu and Kashmir was accorded special status under Article 370. Even though included in 1st Schedule as 15th state, all the provisions of the Constitution which are applicable to other states were not applicable to Jammu and Kashmir. Government of India can declare emergency in Jammu and Kashmir and impose Governor's rule in certain conditions. Matters related to Defense, Foreign relations, Communication and Finance of Jammu and Kashmir is under jurisdiction of Constitution of India.

Parliament had very limited jurisdiction over Jammu and Kashmir in comparison with other states. Till 1963, Parliament could legislate on subjects contained in the Union List, and had no jurisdiction in case of Concurrent List under 7th Schedule with Jammu and Kashmir. The Parliament had no power to legislate Preventive Detention laws for the state; only the state legislature had the power to do so.

== Emergency provisions ==
The Union of India has no power to declare Financial Emergency under Article 360 in the state. The Union can declare emergency in the state only in case of War or External Aggression. No proclamation of emergency made on the grounds of internal disturbance or imminent danger thereof shall have effect in relation to the state unless (a) it is made at the request or with the concurrence of the government of the state; or (b) where it has not been so made, it is applied subsequently by the President to that state at the request or with the concurrence of the government of that state. In December 1964, Articles 356 and 357 were extended to the state.

== Fundamental duties, directive principles and fundamental rights ==
Part IV, Article 36–51 (Directive Principles of the State Policy) and Part IVA, Article 51A (Fundamental Duties) of the Constitution are not applicable to Jammu and Kashmir. In addition to other fundamental rights, Articles 19(1)(f) and 31(2) of the Constitution are still applicable to Jammu and Kashmir; hence the Fundamental Right to property is still guaranteed in this state. It is the only state which does not have to give a detailed record on the money flowing in the state and where it is used and how. In the Indian Constitutional history only one Fundamental Right has been added so far and that is Right to Education Act. This right too has not been extended to Jammu and Kashmir.

== Official languages ==
Provisions of Part XVII of the Constitution apply to Jammu and Kashmir only insofar as they relate to (i) the official language of the Union; (ii) the official language for communication between one state and another; or between a state and the Union; and (iii) language of the proceedings in the Supreme Court. Urdu is the official language of the state but the use of English would also be permitted for official purposes unless the state legislature provides otherwise.

== Relations with Government of India ==
- Article 3 in part 2 of the Jammu and Kashmir constitution stated "Relationship of the State with the Union of India:-The State of Jammu and Kashmir is and will be a part of Union of India."
- Article 5 of the part 2 was about extent of "Executive" and "Legislative" powers of the state and stated that "Jammu and Kashmir Legislative Assembly has executive and legislative power of all matters except those with respect to which Parliament of India has power to make laws for the State under the provisions of the Constitution of India". Sectors in which Government of India can make laws for Jammu and Kashmir includes Defense sector, Foreign affairs, Finance and Communication.
- Article 147 of Part 12 was about amendment of the Jammu and Kashmir Constitution which stated that, "No Bill shall be introduced or moved in State Legislative Assembly to amend or change above mentioned articles 3 and 5."

=== Relations with Pakistan administered Kashmir ===
- Article 48 of Part VI of Jammu and Kashmir constitution defines Pakistan administered Kashmir as "Pakistan Occupied Territory" (POK).
- There were 111 seats in Jammu and Kashmir state legislative assembly. Of these seats, 24 were reserved for representatives from Pakistan-controlled Kashmir, to remain vacant until the area ceases to be occupied by Pakistan and the people residing in that area elect their representatives.

== Miscellaneous ==
Certain special rights have been granted to the permanent residents of Jammu and Kashmir with regard to employment under the state, acquisition of immovable property in the state, settlement in the state, and scholarship and other forms of aid as the state government may provide.

The 5th Schedule pertaining to the administration and control of Schedule Areas and Scheduled Tribes and the 6th Schedule pertaining to administration of tribal areas are not applicable to the state of Jammu and Kashmir. The Provisions of the State Constitution (except those relating to the relationship of the state with the Union) may be amended by an Act of the Legislative Assembly of the state passed by not less than two-thirds of its membership. If such amendment seeks to affect Governor or Election Commission, it needs the President's assent to come into effect. No amendment of the Constitution of India shall extend to Jammu and Kashmir unless so extended by an order of Jammu and Kashmir President under Article 370(1).

No bill or amendment can be introduced or moved in either House of the Legislature which seeks to make any change in the provisions that (a) the State of Jammu and Kashmir is and shall be an integral part of the Union of India (Art. 3) (b) the executive and legislative power of the State does not extend to matters those with respect to which Parliament has power to make laws for the State under the provisions of the Constitution of India (Art. 5), (c) of the Constitution of India as applicable in relation to the State (Art.147 (c) and Art. 147. (Art. 147(a)).

== See also ==
- Ranbir Penal Code
- Article 356 of the Constitution of India
- Article 370 of the Constitution of India
- Interim Constitution of Azad Jammu and Kashmir (1974)
- Part XXI of the Constitution of India
- Article 35A of the Constitution of India
