= Youm-e-Istehsal =

Pakistani observance

Youm-e-Istehsal یوم استحصال
- Observed by: Pakistanis
- Type: Patriotic
- Significance: Opposition to the revocation of Jammu and Kashmir's special status on 5 August 2019, as part of the Kashmir conflict with neighbouring India
- Observances: Rallies, seminars, media productions, etc.
- Date: 5 August
- Frequency: Annual
- First time: 2020; 6 years ago
- Started by: Government of Pakistan
- Related to: India–Pakistan conflict

Youm-e-Istehsal (Urdu: یوم استحصال, transl. "Day of Exploitation") is observed in Pakistan on 5 August every year, as part of the Kashmir conflict with neighbouring India. It decries the day on which the Indian government revoked Jammu and Kashmir's special status in 2019, abolishing the State of Jammu and Kashmir and replacing it with Jammu and Kashmir in the west and Ladakh in the east; both regions are claimed by Pakistan in their entirety. The day is presented as an expression of Pakistani solidarity with the Kashmiri people, who are indigenous to the Muslim-majority Kashmir Valley.

The repealing of Article 370 was met with opposition from Pakistan, which downgraded diplomatic ties with India and suspended various cooperative initiatives between the two countries. Pakistani prime minister Imran Khan likened India to Nazi Germany, while Pakistani president Arif Alvi stated that the Indian government had "learned how to change demography from Israel" in Kashmir.

== History ==
In 2020, on the occasion of the one-year anniversary of the revocation of Kashmir's special status, Pakistan observed 5 August 2020 as Youm-e-Istehsal ("Day of Exploitation") nationally. Rallies and seminars were arranged to express solidarity with Kashmiris.

In 2020, Inter-Services Public Relations media productions also released a song "Ja Chod De Meri Wadi" (leave my valley) by Shafqat Amanat Ali to express solidarity with Kashmir.

In 2025, multiple rallies were held across Pakistan, including in Punjab, Sindh, Khyber Pakhtunkhwa, Balochistan, Azad Jammu and Kashmir, and Gilgit‑Baltistan. Special walks, seminars, and media campaigns were organized to highlight India’s unilateral actions of 2019. Inter-Services Public Relations (ISPR) released a new song titled "Insano Ke Jahan Mein Insaniyat Kahan Hai" ("Where is humanity in the world of humans?") to pay tribute to the Kashmiri people. Pakistani diplomatic missions abroad also held commemorative events and media broadcasts to reinforce global awareness and solidarity. Pakistan’s armed forces reaffirmed support for the “legitimate and ongoing struggle” of Kashmiris, citing international law and United Nations resolutions. The Foreign Office and overseas missions reiterated Pakistan’s solidarity and condemned India’s alleged demographic changes and legal measures aimed at suppressing Kashmiri identity.

== Release of Pakistan's official map ==
On 4 August 2020, Pakistan's government released an updated political map which included Pakistan's territorial claims on Jammu and Kashmir, Ladakh, the Siachen Glacier, the eastern banks of Sir Creek, as well as Junagadh and Manavadar in India's Gujarat region. The map also annotated Ladakh's boundary with China as "frontier undefined", whose status would be formalised by "the sovereign authorities concerned after the settlement of the Jammu and Kashmir dispute." The map was adopted for official use throughout Pakistan. The government renamed the Kashmir Highway, which runs through Islamabad, as Srinagar Highway.
