= Jammu and Kashmir Workers Party =

- Abbreviation: JKWP
- President: Mir Junaid
- Founded: 5 February 2020
- Ideology: Regionalism; Pro-abrogation of Article 370 and 35a Anti-Establishment
- Colours: Green, Brown, Yellow
- Seats in Rajya Sabha: 0 / 245
- Seats in Lok Sabha: 0 / 543
- Seats in Jammu and Kashmir Legislative Assembly: 0 / 90

The Jammu and Kashmir Workers Party (JKWP) is an Indian political party led by Mir Junaid in the Union Territory of Jammu and Kashmir. The party supports the 2019 move to render Article 370 and 35a of the constitution of India inoperative.

== See also ==
- Bharatiya Janata Party
- Ikkjutt Jammu
- Jammu and Kashmir Apni Party
- List of political parties in India
