= Article 370 of the Constitution of India =

Former law granting autonomy to Jammu and Kashmir

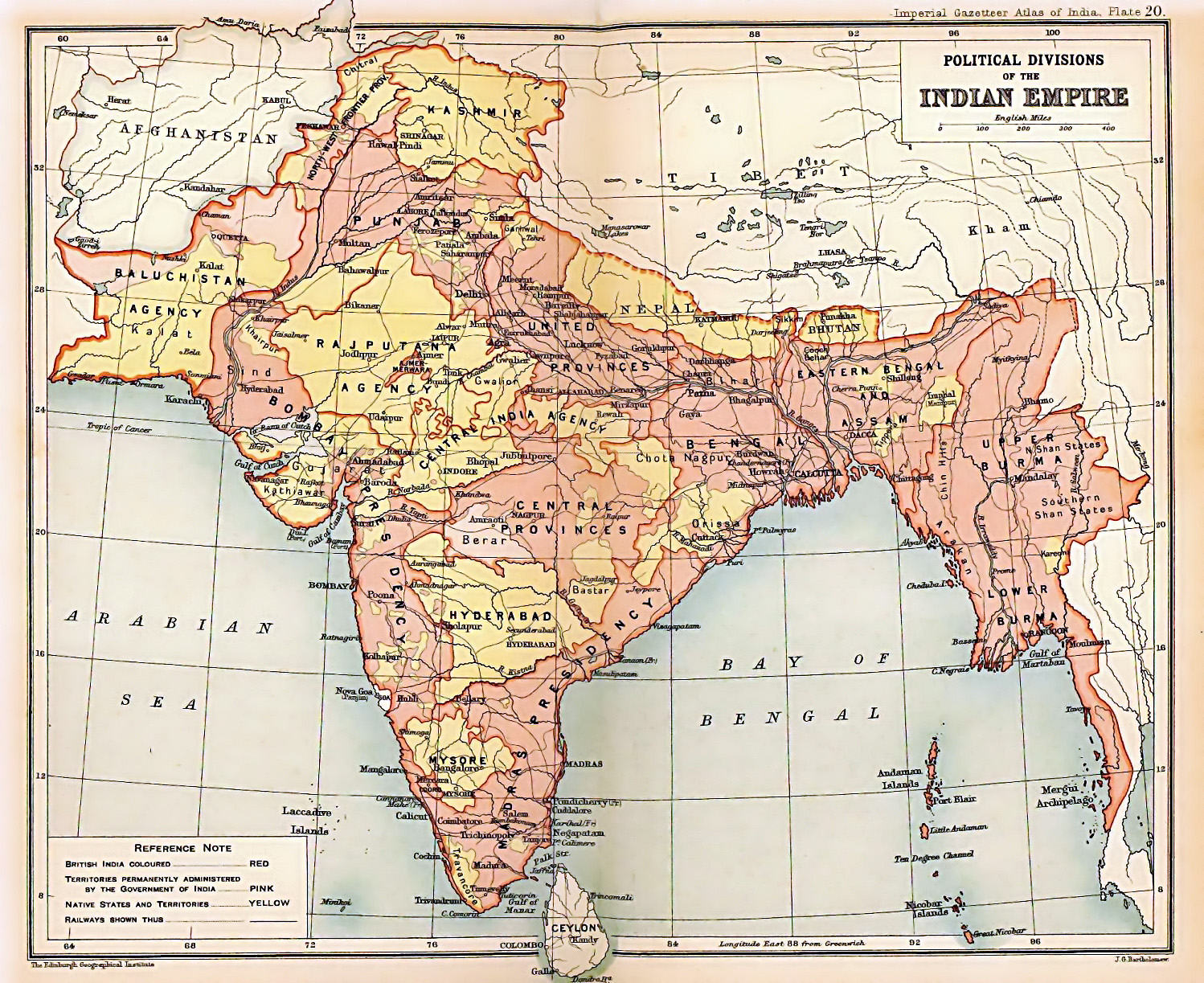
Map of the Indian Empire. The princely states are in yellow.

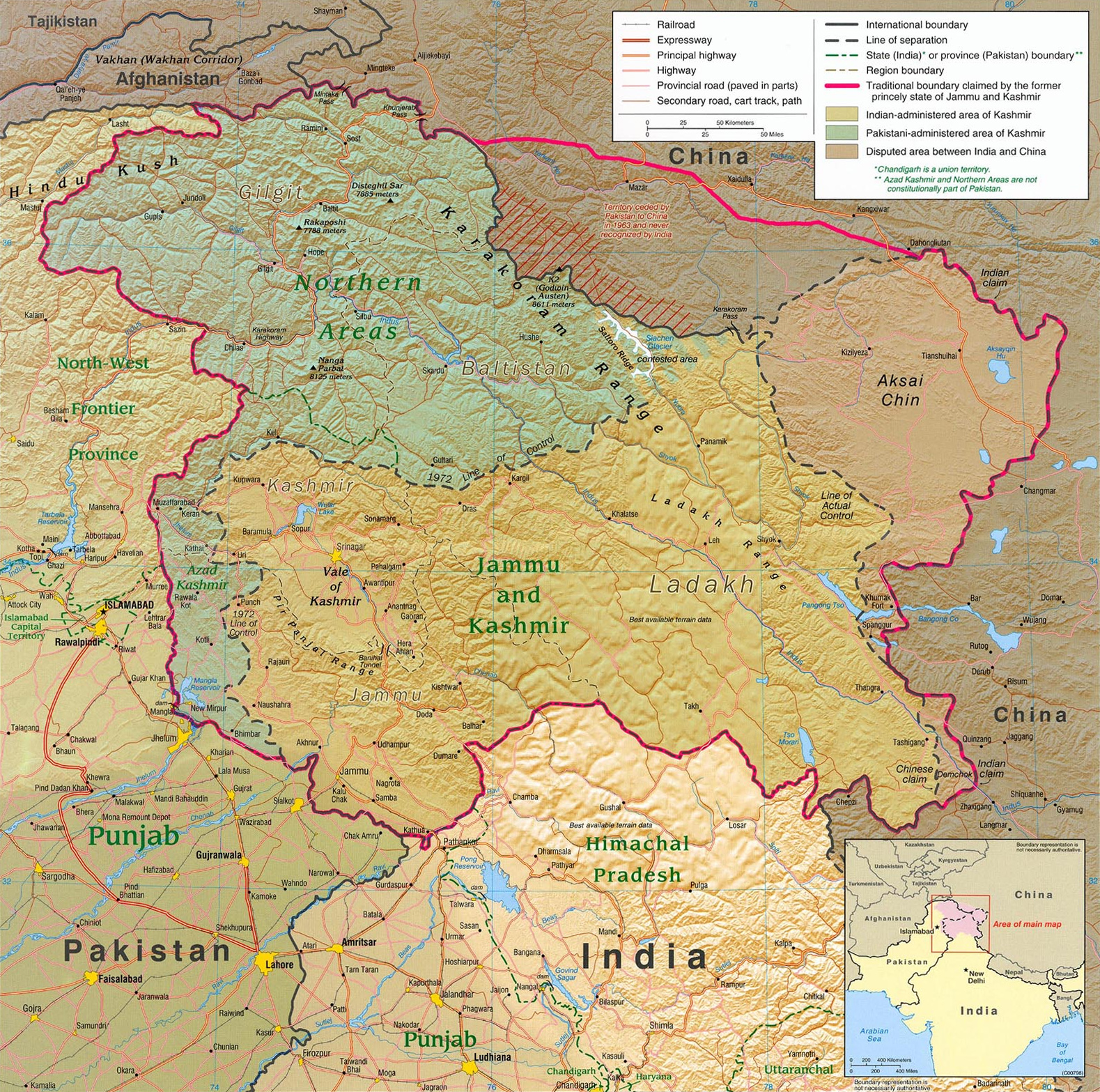
The territory claimed by the former princely state of Jammu and Kashmir is now divided and administered separately by Pakistan, India, and China, shown here in shades of green, yellow and brown respectively

Article 370 of the Indian constitution (Note: Article 370 was originally numbered as Article 306A in the original draft. The idea found in some sources that Article 306A became the "basis" for a later Article 370 is incorrect. It is the same article, later renumbered.) gave special status to Jammu and Kashmir, a region located in the northern part of the Indian subcontinent and part of the larger region of Kashmir which has been the subject of a dispute between India, Pakistan and China since 1947. India administered Jammu and Kashmir as a state from 17 November 1952 to 31 October 2019. Article 370 conferred on it the power to have a separate constitution, a state flag, and autonomy of internal administration.

Article 370 was drafted in Part XXI of the Indian constitution titled "Temporary, Transitional and Special Provisions". It stated that the Constituent Assembly of Jammu and Kashmir would be empowered to recommend the extent to which the Indian constitution would apply to the state. The state assembly could also abrogate Article 370 altogether, in which case all of the Indian Constitution would have applied to the state.

After the state constituent assembly was convened, it recommended the provisions of the Indian constitution that should apply to the state, based on which 1954 Presidential Order was issued. Since the state constituent assembly dissolved itself without recommending the abrogation of Article 370, the article was deemed to have become a permanent feature of the Indian Constitution.

On 5 August 2019, the Government of India issued a Presidential Order superseding the 1954 order, and making all the provisions of the Indian Constitution applicable to Jammu and Kashmir. The order was based on the resolution passed in both houses of India's parliament with a two-thirds majority. A further order on 6 August made all the clauses of Article 370 except clause 1 to be inoperative.

In addition, the Jammu and Kashmir Reorganisation Act, 2019 was passed by the parliament, enacting the division of the state of Jammu and Kashmir into two union territories to be called Union Territory of Jammu and Kashmir and Union Territory of Ladakh. The reorganisation took place on 31 October 2019.

A total of 23 petitions were presented to the Supreme Court of India, challenging the constitutionality of the abrogation of Article 370 of the Constitution, constituting a five-judge bench for the same. On 11 December 2023, a five judge constitution bench unanimously upheld the constitutionality of the abrogation of Article 370 of the Constitution.

== Purpose ==
The state of Jammu and Kashmir's original accession, like all other princely states, was on three matters: defence, foreign affairs and communications. All the princely states were invited to send representatives to India's Constituent Assembly, which was formulating a constitution for the whole of India. They were also encouraged to set up constituent assemblies for their own states. Most states were unable to set up assemblies in time, but a few states did, in particular Saurashtra Union, Travancore-Cochin and Mysore. Even though the States Department developed a model constitution for the states, on 19 May 1949, the rulers and chief ministers of all the states met in the presence of States Department and agreed that separate constitutions for the states were not necessary. They accepted the Constitution of India as their own constitution. The states that did elect constituent assemblies suggested a few amendments which were accepted. The position of all the states (or unions of states) thus became equivalent to that of regular Indian provinces. In particular, this meant that the subjects available for legislation by the central and state governments was uniform across India.

In the case of Jammu and Kashmir, the state's politicians decided to form a separate constituent assembly for the state. The representatives to the Indian Constituent Assembly (Note: The representatives of Jammu and Kashmir were Sheikh Abdullah, Mirza Afzal Beg, Maulana Mohammad Saeed Masoodi and Moti Ram Bagda. They joined the Constituent Assembly on 16 June 1949.) requested that only those provisions of the Indian Constitution should be applied to the state as corresponding to the original Instrument of Accession, and that the state's own constituent assembly would decide on the other matters. Government of India agreed to the demands shortly before the aforesaid 19 May meeting with the other states. (Note: The negotiations were held at the residence of Home minister Vallabhbhai Patel on 15–16 May 1949, and prime minister Nehru recorded the results in a letter on 18 May. It said in particular, "It will be for the Constituent Assembly of the State when convened, to determine in respect of which other subjects the state may accede".) Accordingly, the Article 370 was incorporated into the Indian Constitution, which stipulated that the other articles of the Constitution that gave powers to the Central Government would be applied to Jammu and Kashmir only with the concurrence of the State's own constituent assembly. This was a "temporary provision" in that its applicability was intended to last until the formulation and adoption of the State's constitution. However, the State's constituent assembly dissolved itself on 25 January 1957 without recommending either abrogation or amendment of the Article 370. Thus, the Article was considered to have become a permanent feature of the Indian constitution, as confirmed by various rulings of the Supreme Court of India and the High Court of Jammu and Kashmir, the latest of which was in April 2018.

== Original text ==
370. Temporary provisions with respect to the State of Jammu and Kashmir

(1) Notwithstanding anything contained in this Constitution,—

(a) the provisions of article 238 shall not apply now in relation to the state of Jammu and Kashmir; (Note: Article 238 was repealed by the 7th Amendment in 1956.)
(b) the power of Parliament to make laws for the said state shall be limited to—

(i) those matters in the Union List and the Concurrent List which, in consultation with the Government of the State, are declared by the President to correspond to matters specified in the Instrument of Accession governing the accession of the State to the Dominion of India as the matters with respect to which the Dominion Legislature may make laws for that State; and
(ii) such other matters in the said Lists as, with the concurrence of the Government of the State, the President may by order specify.

Explanation [1950 wording]: For the purpose of this article, the Government of the State means the person for the time being recognised by the President as the Maharaja of Jammu and Kashmir acting on the advice of the Council of Ministers for the time being in office under the Maharaja's Proclamation dated the fifth day of March 1948;

Explanation [1952 wording]: For the purpose of this article, the Government of the State means the person for the time being recognized by the President on the recommendation of the Legislative Assembly of the State as the Sadr-i-Riyasat (now Governor) of Jammu and Kashmir, acting on the advice of the Council of Ministers of the State for the time being in office. (Note: This was changed via the 1952 Presidential order.)

(c) the provisions of article 1 and of this article shall apply in relation to that State;
(d) such of the other provisions of this Constitution shall apply in relation to that State subject to such exceptions and modifications as the President may by order specify:
Provided that no such order which relates to the matters specified in the Instrument of Accession of the State referred to in paragraph (i) of sub-clause (b) shall be issued except in consultation with the Government of the State:
Provided further that no such order which relates to matters other than those referred to in the last preceding proviso shall be issued except with the concurrence of that Government.

(2) If the concurrence of the Government of the State referred to in paragraph (ii) of sub-clause (b) of clause (1) or in the second provision to sub-clause (d) of that clause be given before the Constituent Assembly for the purpose of framing the Constitution of the State is convened, it shall be placed before such Assembly for such decision as it may take thereon.

(3) Notwithstanding anything in the foregoing provisions of this article, the President may, by public notification, declare that this article shall cease to be operative or shall be operative only with such exceptions and modifications and from such date as he may specify:

Provided that the recommendation of the Constituent Assembly of the State referred to in clause (2) shall be necessary before the President issues such a notification.

== Analysis ==
The clause 7 of the Instrument of Accession signed by Maharaja Hari Singh declared that the State could not be compelled to accept any future Constitution of India. The State was within its rights to draft its own constitution and to decide for itself what additional powers to extend to the Central Government. Article 370 was designed to protect those rights. According to the constitutional scholar A. G. Noorani, Article 370 records a 'solemn compact'. Neither India nor the State can unilaterally amend or abrogate the Article except in accordance with the terms of the Article.

Article 370 embodied six special provisions for Jammu and Kashmir:

1. It exempted the State from the complete applicability of the Constitution of India. The State was conferred the power to have its own constitution.
2. Central legislative powers over the State were limited, at the time of framing, to the three subjects of defence, foreign affairs and communications.
3. Other constitutional powers of the Central Government could be extended to the State only with the concurrence of the State Government.
4. The 'concurrence' was only provisional. It had to be ratified by the State's Constituent Assembly.
5. The State Government's authority to give 'concurrence' lasted only until the State Constituent Assembly was convened. Once the State Constituent Assembly finalised the scheme of powers and dispersed, no further extension of powers was possible.
6. Article 370 could be abrogated or amended only upon the recommendation of the State's Constituent Assembly.

Once the State's Constitutional Assembly convened on 31 October 1951, the State Government's power to give `concurrence' lapsed. After the Constituent Assembly dispersed on 17 November 1956, adopting a Constitution for the State, the only authority provided to extend more powers to the Central Government or to accept Central institutions vanished.

Noorani states that this understanding of the constitutionality of the Centre-State relations informed the decisions of India till 1957, but that it was abandoned afterwards. In subsequent years, other provisions continued to be extended to the State with the 'concurrence' of the State Government.

== Presidential orders ==
When Article 370 was originally created, only two articles of the Indian constitution applied in full to Jammu and Kashmir. Other provisions of the constitution would apply with exceptions and modifications specified by the president in his Order in consultation with or the concurrence of the government of the state. In exercise of these powers, as conferred by clause (3) of article 370 of the constitution, the president made a series of orders with the concurrence of the government of the state of Jammu and Kashmir.

=== Presidential order of 1950 ===
The Presidential order of 1950, officially The Constitution (Application to Jammu and Kashmir) Order, 1950, came into force on 26 January 1950 contemporaneously with the constitution of India. It specified the subjects and articles of the Indian constitution that corresponded to the Instrument of Accession as required by the clause b(i) of the Article 370.

Thirty eight subjects from the Union List were mentioned as matters on which the Union legislature could make laws for the State. Certain articles in ten of the twenty-two parts of the Indian constitution were extended to Jammu and Kashmir, with modifications and exceptions as agreed by the state government.

According to scholar Bodh Raj Sharma, at this stage, "235 articles of the Indian constitution were inapplicable to the state of Jammu & Kashmir, 9 were partially applicable, and 29 were applicable in a modified form".

This order was superseded by the Presidential order of 1954.

=== Presidential order of 1952 ===
The Presidential order of 1952 was published on 15 November 1952, at the request of the state government. It amended the Article 370, replacing the phrase "recognised by the President as the Maharaja of Jammu and Kashmir" by "recognized by the President on the recommendation of the Legislative Assembly of the State as the Sadr-i-Riyasat". The amendment represented the abolition of the monarchy of Jammu and Kashmir.

Background: The Constituent Assembly of Jammu and Kashmir was elected in 1951 and convened on 31 October 1951. The Basic Principles committee of the Constituent Assembly recommended the abolition of the monarchy, which was unanimously approved by the Assembly on 12 June 1952. In the same month, the Hindu-dominated Jammu Praja Parishad submitted a memorandum to the president of India demanding the full application of the Indian constitution to the State. The government of India summoned a delegation from Jammu and Kashmir in Delhi for discussions on the relations between the Centre and the State. After discussions, the 1952 Delhi Agreement was reached.

The State's prime minister Sheikh Abdullah was slow to implement the provisions of the Delhi Agreement. However, in August 1952, the State Constituent Assembly adopted a resolution abolishing the monarchy and replacing the position by an elected Head of State (called Sadar-i-Riyasat). Despite reservations on this piecemeal approach to adopting provisions, the Central government acquiesced, leading to the Presidential Order of 1952. The Legislative Assembly elected Karan Singh, who was already acting as the Prince Regent, as the new Sadar-i-Riyasat.

=== Presidential order of 1954 ===
The Presidential order of 1954, officially The Constitution (Application to Jammu and Kashmir) Order, 1954 came into force on 14 May 1954. Issued with the agreement of the State's Constituent Assembly, it was a comprehensive order seeking to implement the 1952 Delhi Agreement. Arguably, it went further than the Delhi Agreement in some respects.

The provisions implementing the Delhi Agreement were:

1. Indian citizenship was extended to the 'permanent residents' of Jammu and Kashmir (formerly called 'state subjects'). Simultaneously, the Article 35A was added to the constitution, empowering the state legislature to legislate on the privileges of permanent residents with regard to immovable property, settlement in the state and employment.
2. The fundamental rights of the Indian constitution were extended to the state. However, the state legislature was empowered to legislate on preventive detention for the purpose of internal security. The State's land reform legislation (which acquired land without compensation) was also protected.
3. The jurisdiction of the Supreme Court of India was extended to the State.
4. The Central government was given power to declare national emergency in the event of external aggression. However, its power to do so for internal disturbances could be exercised only with the concurrence of the State Government.

In addition, the following provisions which were not previously decided in the Delhi Agreement were also implemented:

1. Financial relations between the Centre and the State were placed on the same footing as the other States. The State's custom duties were abolished.
2. Decisions affecting the disposition of the State could be made by the Central government, but only with the consent of the State government.

Background: The State government's decision to abolish the monarchy led to increased agitation by the Jammu Praja Parishad, which found support among the Ladakhi Buddhists and the Hindu parties of India. In response, Sheikh Abdullah started questioning the value of Kashmir's accession to India, leading to a loss of support among his Cabinet members. On 8 August 1953, Sheikh Abdullah was dismissed from the post of prime minister by the Sadar-i-Riyasat Karan Singh and his erstwhile deputy Bakshi Ghulam Mohammad was appointed in his place. Abdullah and several of his colleagues were arrested and put in prison.

The purged Constituent Assembly, with 60 of the original 75 members, unanimously adopted on 6 February 1954, the recommendations of its Basic Principles Committee and the Advisory Committee on Fundamental Rights and Citizenship. According to the Basic Principles Committee:

While preserving the internal autonomy of the State, all the obligations which flow from the fact of accession and also its elaboration as contained in the Delhi Agreement should find an appropriate place in the Constitution. The Committee is of the opinion that it is high time that finality in this respect should be reached and the relationship of the State with the Union should be expressed in clear and precise terms.

The Presidential order of 1954 was issued based on these recommendations.

=== Further presidential orders (1955–2018) ===
In addition to these original orders, forty-seven Presidential orders were issued between 11 February 1956 and 19 February 1994, making various other provisions of the Constitution of India applicable to Jammu and Kashmir. All these orders were issued with the 'concurrence of the Government of the State' without any Constituent Assembly. (Note: The Constituent Assembly was dissolved by a resolution passed by the representatives of Kashmir in 1956, and it ceased to exist on 26 January 1957.) Some of these Presidential orders were issued when the state was under President's rule and had "no Kashmir government at all", states Jill Cottrell. (Note: While the Congress party central government led by Rajiv Gandhi was in power, the President of India made an order under Article 370, on 30 July 1986, extending to Jammu and Kashmir Article 249 of the Indian Constitution in order to empower Indian Parliament to legislate on matters in the State List after obtaining a Rajya Sabha resolution. The then Governor Jagmohan gave concurrence on behalf of the state government while the state was under President's rule, despite protests from G. A. Lone – the Law secretary of Jammu & Kashmir – and in the absence of a Council of Ministers.) The concurrence in this instance was given by the Governor of the state, a nominee of the Union government. The constitutional validity of the procedure was upheld by the Supreme Court of India in 1972. (Note: In the 1972 case Mohd Maqbool Damnoo vs State of Jammu and Kashmir (1 SCC 536), the petitioner challenged the constitutionality of interpreting and replacing the Sadar-i-Riyasat with the Governor of the state. The Supreme Court of India held that the "Governor is the successor to the Sadar-i-Riyasat and is able to give the State Government's concurrence to any amendments under Article 370", states Louise Tillin.)

The effect of the Presidential orders issued since 1954 had been to extend 94 of the 97 subjects in the Union List (the powers of the Central Government) to the State of Jammu and Kashmir, and 260 of the 395 Articles of the Constitution of India. All of these orders had been issued as amendments to the Presidential Order of 1954, rather than as replacements to it, presumably because their constitutionality was in doubt, according to Cottrell.

This process has been termed the 'erosion' of the Article 370. Home minister Gulzarilal Nanda (1963–1966) opined that the terms for the "special status" granted to Jammu and Kashmir in this Article included a "very simple" process to amend, by an Executive Order of the President of India, whereas the powers of all other states could only be amended by the "normal process of (constitutional) amendment [...] subject to stringent conditions". According to him, Article 370 was "the only way" of taking the Constitution of India into Jammu and Kashmir, it is a tunnel through which "a good deal of traffic has already passed and more will". The successors of Nanda in the Home Ministry have interpreted the Article in the same manner.

== Autonomy of Jammu and Kashmir: Structure and limitations ==
India's constitution is a federal structure. The subjects for legislation are divided into a 'Union List', a 'State List', and a 'Concurrent List'. The Union List of ninety-six subjects, including defence, military and foreign affairs, major transport systems, commercial issues like banking, stock exchanges and taxes, are provided for the Union government to legislate exclusively. The State List of sixty-six items covering prisons, agriculture, most industries and certain taxes, are available for States to legislate on. The Concurrent List, on which both the Centre and States may legislate include criminal law, marriage, bankruptcy, trade unions, professions and price control. In case of conflict, the Union legislation takes precedence. The 'residual power', to make laws on matters not specified in the Constitution, rests with the Union. The Union may also specify certain industries, waterways, ports etc. to be 'national', in which case they become Union subjects.

In the case of Jammu and Kashmir, the 'Union List' and the 'Concurrent List' were initially limited to the matters ceded in the Instrument of Accession; later, they were extended with the concurrence of the State Government. The 'residual powers' continued to rest with the State rather than the Union. According to the State Autonomy Committee, ninety-four of the ninety-seven items in the Union List applied to Jammu and Kashmir; the provisions of the Central Bureau of Intelligence and Investigation and preventive detention did not apply. Of the 'Concurrent List', twenty-six of the forty-seven items applied to Jammu and Kashmir; the items of marriage and divorce, infants and minors, transfer of property other than agricultural land, contracts and torts, bankruptcy, trusts, courts, family planning and charities had been omitted – i.e., the State had exclusive right to legislate on those matters. The right to legislate on elections to state bodies also rested with the State.

== Applicability of the Indian law to Jammu and Kashmir ==
Acts passed by Indian Parliament have been extended to Jammu and Kashmir over a period of time.

- All India Services Act
- Negotiable Instruments Act
- Border Security Force Act
- Central Vigilance Commission Act
- Essential Commodities Act
- Haj Committee Act
- Income Tax Act
- The Central Goods and Services Tax Act, 2017
- Integrated Goods and Services Tax Act, 2017
- The Central Laws (Extension To Jammu And Kashmir) Act, 1956
- The Central Laws (Extension To Jammu And Kashmir) Act, 1968

The non-applicability of National Human Rights Commission (NHRC) Act by claiming recourse to Article 370 was set aside in 2010.

== Constitution of Jammu and Kashmir ==
WE, THE PEOPLE OF THE STATE OF JAMMU AND KASHMIR,

having solemnly resolved, in pursuance of the accession of this State to India which took place on the twenty sixth day of October, 1947, to further define the existing relationship of the State with the Union of India as an integral part thereof, and to secure to ourselves—

JUSTICE, social, economic and political;

LIBERTY of thought, expression, belief, faith and worship;

EQUALITY of status and of opportunity; and to promote among us all;

FRATERNITY assuring the dignity of the individual and the unity of the nation;

IN OUR CONSTITUENT ASSEMBLY this seventeenth day
of November, 1956, do HEREBY ADOPT, ENACT AND GIVE
TO OURSELVES THIS CONSTITUTION."

— Preamble of Constitution of Jammu & Kashmir.

Preamble and Article 3 of the erstwhile Constitution of Jammu and Kashmir stated that the State of Jammu and Kashmir is and shall be an integral part of the Union of India. Article 5 stated that the executive and legislative power of the State extend to all matters except those with respect to which Parliament has power to make laws for the State under the provisions of the Constitution of India. The constitution was adopted on 17 November 1956 and came into force on 26 January 1957.

The Constitution of Jammu and Kashmir was rendered infructuous by The Constitution (Application to Jammu and Kashmir) Order, 2019 (C.O. 272) issued by the president of India on 5 August 2019.

== Human rights ==
In the 1954 Presidential order, among other things, the Fundamental Rights in the Indian Constitution were made applicable to Kashmir with some exceptions. The state legislature further modified these, as well as added "preventive detention laws" that it exempted from human rights challenges for twenty-five years. According to Cottrell, the autonomy and special status granted to the state of Jammu and Kashmir makes it possible "for it to have rather lower standards of human rights".

=== Permanent residence issues ===
Article 370 acknowledges the special status of the state of Jammu and Kashmir in terms of autonomy and its ability to formulate laws for the state's permanent residents. (Note: The legal term "permanent residents" replaced the term "state subjects" in earlier laws.) Further, the state gave special privileges to the permanent residents in matters such as residence, property, education and government jobs, which were unavailable to others. Article 35A of the Indian constitution has been interpreted by some Kashmiri officials to disallow challenging any state law, merely on the ground of infringing upon rights, granted to all citizens of India via the national constitution.

=== Women's rights ===
The state government officials of Jammu and Kashmir have issued "permanent resident certificates". However, these certificates differ by gender. The certificates issued to females are marked "valid only till marriage", while certificates for males have no such markings. If a woman married to an Indian outside of Kashmir, she was denied a new certificate. These certificates are required by the Jammu and Kashmir state officials from anyone seeking to acquire immovable property, education or employment within the state. Under the state laws, the Jammu and Kashmir High Court quashed the appointment of Susheela Sawhney in 1979 – a Kashmiri-born woman, as assistant professor in the Government Medical College because she was married to a man outside of Kashmir. Numerous other women – such as Sunita Sharma, Anjali Khosla, Abha Jain, Kamla Rani, Reeta Gupta, and others – sued the state government on different but related matters, charging discrimination based on their gender. These cases were reviewed in 2002 by the full bench of the state's High Court, which overturned the past rulings and found that the state has discriminated based on gender.

In 2004, the Jammu and Kashmir Legislative Assembly passed the Permanent Residents (Disqualification) Bill – also known as the Daughter's Bill. The new law sought to deprive daughters of the state's permanent residents (Note: The legal term "permanent residents" replaced the term "state subjects" in earlier laws.) of all their native-born rights and privileges if they marry someone who is not the subject of Jammu and Kashmir. This law applied only to the female descendants of Kashmir subjects, and does not apply to the male descendants.

According to Sehla Ashai, per its provisions, "the women who married non-state subjects [men from other states of India or abroad] could no longer claim state subject status, would thereby lose both preferential treatment in government hiring and the ability to acquire new property in the state". The opponents to this bill argued that this is a "violation of Kashmiri women's fundamental rights under the Indian Constitution" and that the bill discriminated human beings by their gender. The supporters argued that if this bill failed to pass it "would be the end of constitutionally guaranteed autonomy for Jammu and Kashmir" and that the law was created to "protect the ethnic identity of the people of Jammu and Kashmir". The bill was supported by the state-based Jammu & Kashmir National Conference Party and Jammu and Kashmir Peoples Democratic Party, but challenged by the Indian National Congress party. It was reintroduced in J&K legislative houses in August 2004 as an amendment to the state constitution, but it failed to pass the Upper House of the state by the required two-thirds majority.

In 2010, the Permanent Residents (Disqualification) legislation was reintroduced in the state's legislative houses, with support from the two main state-based parties. It again attracted criticism that "such bills have no sanction in the legal and constitutional history of the state or in Article 370".

== Other issues ==
=== Amarnath land transfer controversy ===
On 26 May 2008, the Government of India and the state government of Jammu and Kashmir reached an agreement to transfer 100 acres (0.40 km^{2}) of forest land to the Shri Amarnathji Shrine Board (SASB) to set up temporary shelters and facilities for Hindu pilgrims. Kashmiri separatists opposed the move citing reasons that it will jeopardize Article 370 which gives separate identity to the people of Jammu and Kashmir and prevents Indian citizens from freely settling in Kashmir. People in Kashmir staged widespread protests against this decision by government of India. Due to the protests, the J&K State government relented and reversed the decision to transfer land. As a result, Hindus in the Jammu region launched counter-agitations against this roll back.

== Calls for abrogation ==
In 2014, as part of Bharatiya Janata Party manifesto for the 2014 general election, the party pledged to integrate the state of Jammu and Kashmir into the Union of India. After winning the elections, attempts were made by the party along with its parent organisation, the Rashtriya Swayamsevak Sangh (RSS), for the abrogation of Article 370. Former prince regent and Congress leader Karan Singh opined that an integral review of Article 370 was overdue and, it need to be worked on jointly with the State of Jammu and Kashmir.

However, in October 2015, the High Court of Jammu and Kashmir ruled that the Article 370 cannot be "abrogated, repealed or even amended." It explained that the clause (3) of the Article conferred power to the State's Constituent Assembly to recommend to the President on the matter of the repeal of the Article. Since the Constituent Assembly did not make such a recommendation before its dissolution in 1957, Article 370 has taken on the features of a "permanent provision" despite being titled a temporary provision in the Constitution. On 3 April 2018, the Supreme Court of India gave a similar opinion declaring that Article 370 has acquired a permanent status. It stated that, since the State Constituent Assembly has ceased to exist, the President of India would not be able to fulfill the mandatory provisions required for its abrogation.

In 2019, as part of Bharatiya Janata Party manifesto for the 2019 general election, the party again pledged to integrate the state of Jammu and Kashmir into the Union of India.

Since its formation in 1990, the Kashmiri Hindu organisation Panun Kashmir had repeatedly criticised Article 370 and supported its abrogation, along with Article 35A.

The Jammu and Kashmir Workers Party and IkkJutt Jammu also support the removal of Article 370 and 35A and the integration of Jammu and Kashmir.

== 2019 Developments ==
=== Presidential order of 2019 ===
On 5 August 2019, Home Minister Amit Shah announced in the Rajya Sabha (upper house of the Indian Parliament) that the President of India had issued The Constitution (Application to Jammu and Kashmir) Order, 2019 (C.O. 272) under Article 370, superseding the Constitution (Application to Jammu and Kashmir) Order, 1954. The order stated that all the provisions of the Indian Constitution applied to Jammu and Kashmir. Whereas the 1954 order specified that only some articles of the Indian constitution to apply to the state, the new order removed all such restrictions. This in effect meant that the separate Constitution of Jammu and Kashmir stood abrogated. The order was stated to have been issued with the "concurrence of the Government of State of Jammu and Kashmir" which apparently meant the Governor appointed by the Union government.

The Presidential Order 2019 also added clause (4) with four sub-clauses to Article 367 under "interpretations". The phrase "Sadar-i-Riyasat acting on the aid and advice of the Council of Ministers" shall be construed as the "Governor of Jammu and Kashmir". The phrase "State government" shall include the Governor. In proviso to clause (3) of article 370 of the Constitution, the expression "Constituent Assembly of the State referred to in clause (2)" shall read "Legislative Assembly of the State". (Note: See here for the complete Part XXI of the Indian Constitution.) According to Jill Cottrell, some of the Presidential orders under Article 370 have been issued since 1954 in similar circumstances when the state was under President's rule. The Union governments interpreted the "concurrence of the state government" under these circumstances to mean the Governor.

Immediately after placing the Presidential Order 2019 before the Rajya Sabha, Home Minister Amit Shah moved a resolution recommending that the president issue an order under article 370(3) rendering all clauses of Article 370 inoperative. After the resolution was adopted by both houses of the parliament, the president issued Constitutional Order 273 on 6 August 2019 replacing the extant text of Article 370 with the following text:

370. All provisions of this Constitution, as amended from time to time, without any modifications or exceptions, shall apply to the State of Jammu and Kashmir notwithstanding anything contrary contained in article 152 or article 308 or any other article of this Constitution or any other provision of the Constitution of Jammu and Kashmir or any law, document, judgement, ordinance, order, by-law, rule, regulation, notification, custom or usage having the force of law in the territory of India, or any other instrument, treaty or agreement as envisaged under article 363 or otherwise.

=== Change of status of Jammu and Kashmir ===
On 5 August 2019, the Home Minister Amit Shah introduced the Jammu and Kashmir Reorganisation Bill, 2019 in the Rajya Sabha to convert Jammu and Kashmir's status of a state to two separate union territories, namely Union Territory of Jammu and Kashmir and Union Territory of Ladakh. The union territory of Jammu and Kashmir was proposed to have a legislature under the bill whereas the union territory of Ladakh is proposed to not have one. By the end of the day, the bill was passed by Rajya Sabha with 125 votes in its favour and 61 against (67% in favour). The next day, the bill was passed by the Lok Sabha with 370 votes in its favour and 70 against it (84% in favour). The bill became an Act after it was signed by the president.

The two union territories came into existence on 31 October 2019, which was celebrated as National Unity Day. The president of India appointed a Lt. Governor for the Union Territory of Jammu and Kashmir and a Lt. Governor for the Union Territory of Ladakh. Both the Lt. Governors were sworn in by Justice Gita Mittal, the Chief Justice of Jammu and Kashmir High Court, on 31 October 2019, first at Leh for Ladakh UT and then at Srinagar for Jammu and Kashmir UT. President's Rule under article 356 of the Constitution of India was ended in the state of Jammu and Kashmir on the night of 30 October 2019. President's Rule is not applicable to and is not needed in a union territory as a union territory is controlled by the central government. The President issued an order stating that he will rule the union territory of Jammu and Kashmir directly until the legislative assembly is constituted in the union territory.

== Popular media ==
The Hindi film Article 370, which is set against the backdrop of the revocation of the special status represented by Article 370, featuring actress Yami Gautam in a lead role, was released on 23rd February 2024, garnering mixed reviews from both audiences and critics.

In 2022, Arghya Sengupta, founder and research director of the Vidhi Centre for Legal Policy, published Hamīñ Ast? A Biography of Article 370 (Navi Books), which explores the political and constitutional history of the provision.

== See also ==
- 1974 Indira–Sheikh accord
- 2014 Jammu and Kashmir Legislative Assembly election
- 2024 Jammu and Kashmir Legislative Assembly election
- Article 356
- Article 35A of Constitution of India
- Constitution of Jammu and Kashmir
- Instrument of Accession (Jammu and Kashmir)
- Kashmir conflict
- Part XXI of the Constitution of India

== Bibliography ==
- Ashai, Sehla (2010), "The Jammu and Kashmir State Subjects Controversy of 2004", Drexel Law Review, 2: 537–555
- Chowdhary, Rekha (2015), Jammu and Kashmir: Politics of Identity and Separatism, Routledge, ISBN 978-1-317-41405-6
- Cottrell, Jill (2013), "Kashmir: The vanishing autonomy", in Yash Ghai; Sophia Woodman (eds.), Practising Self-Government: A Comparative Study of Autonomous Regions, Cambridge University Press, pp. 163–199, doi:10.1017/CBO9781139088206.006, ISBN 978-1-107-29235-2
- Das Gupta, Jyoti Bhusan (1968), Jammu and Kashmir, Springer (2012 reprint), ISBN 978-94-011-9231-6
- Diwan, Paras (1953), "Kashmir and the Indian Union: The Legal Position", The International and Comparative Law Quarterly, 2 (3), Cambridge University Press: 333–353, doi:10.1093/iclqaj/2.3.333, JSTOR 755438
- Jaffrelot, Christophe (2009). Hindu Nationalism: A Reader. Princeton University Press. ISBN 978-1-40082-8036.
- Jagota, S.P. (1960), "Development of Constitutional Relations between Jammu and Kashmir and India, 1950–60", Journal of the Indian Law Institute, 2 (4): 519–538, JSTOR 43949608
- Hassan, Khalid Wasim (2009), History Revisited: Narratives on Political and Constitutional Changes in Kashmir (1947–1990) (PDF), Bangalore: The Institute for Social and Economic Change, ISBN 978-81-7791-189-3
- Kumar, Ashutosh (2005), "The Constitutional and Legal Routes", in Samaddar, Ranabir (ed.), The Politics of Autonomy: Indian Experiences, SAGE Publications, pp. 93–113, ISBN 9780761934530
- Kumar, Virendra (2004), "The Jammu and Kashmir Permanent Residents (Disqualification) Bill 2004: A Constitutional Perspective", Journal of the Indian Law Institute, 46 (4): 534–553, JSTOR 43951935
- Menon, V. P. (1956), The Story of Integration of the Indian States, Orient Longman, archived from the original on 8 December 2019 – via Questia
- Narain, Akanksha (2016), "Revival of Violence in Kashmir: The Threat to India's Security", Counter Terrorist Trends and Analyses, 8 (7): 15–20, JSTOR 26351433
- Noorani, A. G. (2011), Article 370: A Constitutional History of Jammu and Kashmir, Oxford University Press, ISBN 978-0-19-807408-3
- Qasim, Syed Mir (1992), My Life and Times, Allied Publishers, ISBN 9788170233558
- Puri, Balraj (2015), "Jamu and Kashmir", in Myron Wiener (ed.), State Politics in India, Princeton University Press, ISBN 978-1-4008-7914-4
- Sharma, Bodh Raj (1958), "The Special Position of Jammu and Kashmir in the Indian Constitution", The Indian Journal of Political Science, 19 (3): 282–290, JSTOR 42743614
- Singh, Jasbir; Vohra, Anupama (2007), "Citizenship Rights of Women in Jammu and Kashmir", Indian Journal of Gender Studies, 14 (1), SAGE Publications: 157–171, doi:10.1177/097152150601400109, S2CID 145365144
- Snedden, Christopher (2015), Understanding Kashmir and Kashmiris, Oxford University Press, ISBN 978-1-84904-621-3
- Tillin, Louise (2016), "Asymmetric Federalism", in Sujit Choudhry; Madhav Khosla; Pratap Bhanu Mehta (eds.), The Oxford Handbook of the Indian Constitution, Oxford University Press, pp. 546–, ISBN 978-0-19-870489-8
- Tillin, Louise (2006), "United in Diversity? Asymmetry in Indian Federalism", Publius: The Journal of Federalism, 37 (1), Oxford University Press: 45–67, doi:10.1093/publius/pjl017, hdl:10.1093/publius/pjl017
