= A. G. Noorani =

Indian lawyer, historian and author (1930–2024)

Abdul Ghafoor Majeed Noorani

Personal details
- Born: 16 September 1930 Bombay, Bombay Presidency, British India (now Mumbai, Maharashtra, India)
- Died: 29 August 2024 (aged 93) Mumbai, Maharashtra, India
- Education: Government Law College, Mumbai
- Profession: Lawyer, political commentator

Abdul Ghafoor Majeed Noorani (16 September 1930 – 29 August 2024), better known as A. G. Noorani, was an Indian scholar, lawyer and political commentator. He practised as an advocate in the Supreme Court of India and in the Bombay High Court.

== Early life and education ==
Noorani was born in Bombay (now Mumbai) on 16 September 1930. He attended a Jesuit school, St. Mary's, and got his law degree from Government Law College, Mumbai.

== Career ==
Noorani joined the defence team for Sheikh Abdullah of Kashmir in 1962, and developed a long association with the Kashmiri leader. He appeared in the Bombay High Court for former Tamil Nadu Chief Minister Karunanidhi against the latter's main political rival J. Jayalalithaa. He was said to be 'a staunch defender of civil liberties and human rights. His sharp criticism of government policies, communalism, and the erosion of democratic values made him a respected if sometimes controversial figure.'

Noorani was a prolific writer and his columns appeared in various publications, including Hindustan Times, The Hindu, Dawn, The Statesman, Frontline, Economic and Political Weekly and Dainik Bhaskar. He was the author of numerous books including: The Kashmir Question, Badruddin Tyabji Ministers' Misconduct, Brezhnev's Plan for Asian Security, The Presidential System, The Trial of Bhagat Singh, Constitutional Questions in India and The RSS and the BJP: A Division of Labour (LeftWord Books, 2000). He has also authored the biographies of Badruddin Tyabji and Dr. Zakir Husain.

== Death ==
Noorani died in Mumbai on 29 August 2024, at the age of 93. His death was widely mourned and in Kashmir, his loss was felt personal. Mirwaiz Umar Farooq and several other prominent figures from Kashmir mourned his death.

== Publications ==
- The Destruction of Hyderabad (2014), ISBN 9781849044394
- The Kashmir Dispute 1947–2012, 2 Volume set (editor, 2013), ISBN 9789382381198, ISBN 9789382381204
- Islam, South Asia and the Cold War (2012) ISBN 9789382381006
- Article 370: A Constitutional History of Jammu and Kashmir (2011) ISBN 978-0198074083
- Jinnah and Tilak: Comrades in the Freedom Struggle (2010)ISBN 9780195478297
- India–China Boundary Problem 1846–1947: History and Diplomacy (2010), ISBN 9780198070689
- The RSS and the BJP:A Division of Labour(2008), ISBN 9788187496137
- Indian Political Trials 1775–1947 (2006), ISBN 9780195687767
- Constitutional Questions and Citizens' Rights (2006)ISBN 9780195678291
- The Trial of Bhagat Singh: Politics of Justice (2005), ISBN 9780195678178
- The Muslims of India: A Documentary Record (editor, 2003)ISBN 978-0195661583
- Islam and Jihad: Prejudice versus Reality (2002) ISBN 9781842772713
- The Babri Masjid Question 1528–2003: 'A Matter of National Honour', in two volumes (2003). ISBN 9789382381464 ISBN 9789382381457
- Constitutional Questions in India: The President, Parliament and the States (2002), ISBN 9780195658774
- Savarkar and Hindutva (2002), ISBN 9788187496830
- Challenges to Civil Rights Guarantees in India, (2012) ISBN 9780199088577
