= Constituent Assembly of Jammu and Kashmir =

1951–1957 body to draft a constitution

Jammu and Kashmir Constituent Assembly
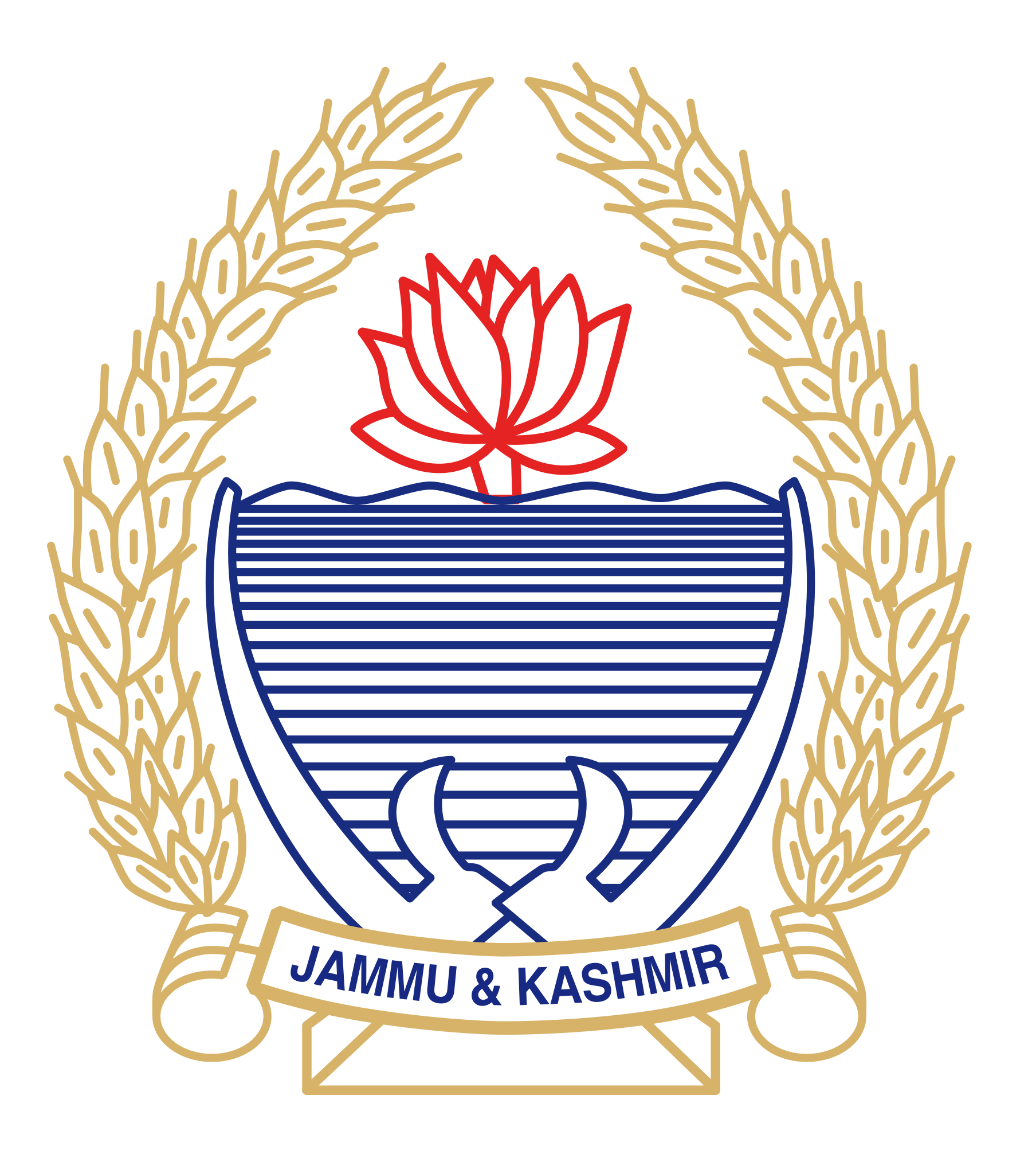

Type
- Type: Constituent assembly

History
- Established: October 1951
- Disbanded: 26 January 1957
- Succeeded by: Jammu and Kashmir Legislative Assembly

Leadership
- Chairman of the Constituent Assembly: Ghulam Mohammed Sadiq, JKNC

The Jammu and Kashmir Constituent Assembly was a body of representatives elected in 1951 to formulate the constitution of Jammu and Kashmir. The Constituent Assembly was dissolved on 26 January 1957, based on Mir Qasim resolution it adopted and ratified the constitution of Jammu and Kashmir on 17 November 1956.

== Background ==
In 1947, British rule in India ended with the creation of two new nations—India and Pakistan—and the abandonment of British suzerainty over the 562 Indian princely states. According to the Indian Independence Act 1947, "the suzerainty of His Majesty over the Indian States lapses, and with it, all treaties and agreements in force at the date of the passing of this Act between His Majesty and the rulers of Indian States", so the states were left to choose whether to join India or Pakistan or to remain independent. Jammu and Kashmir had a predominantly Muslim population but a Hindu ruler, and was the largest of the princely states. Its ruler was the Dogra King Hari Singh.

In October 1947, Pashtun tribals at the behest of the Pakistani government, invaded Kashmir. Unable to withstand the invasion, the Maharaja signed The Instrument of Accession on 26 October 1947 and that was accepted by the Government of India on 27 October 1947. India subsequently sent its forces into Kashmir leading to Indo-Pakistani War of 1947. In January 1948 India moved the U.N. which led to United Nations Security Council Resolution 47 of 21 April 1948. This resolution required among other things that Pakistan withdraw from the areas of Jammu and Kashmir which it had occupied in 1947 immediately and conditions be created for a free and impartial plebiscite to decide the future of the state.

== Elections ==
When the required withdrawal did not occur for several years Jammu & Kashmir National Conference which was the largest political party in the state recommended convening the constituent assembly in a resolution passed on 27 October 1950. On 1 May 1951 Karan Singh then Head of state of Jammu and Kashmir issued a proclamation directing the formation of this assembly. The assembly was to be constituted of elected representatives of the people of the state. For purposes of this election the state was divided into constituencies containing population of 40,000 or as near thereto as possible and each electing one member. The United Nations Security Council stated in its resolution 91 dated 30 March 1951 that it would not consider these elections to be a substitute for a free and impartial plebiscite to the people of Jammu and Kashmir.

However, the 1951 elections were said to be totally rigged. Polls were conducted in Indian administered Kashmir in August–September 1951. There were no women registered as voters in 1951 Jammu and Kashmir elections. But there was one woman who contested who lost her deposit. Jammu & Kashmir National Conference won all the 75 seats under the leadership of Sheikh Abdullah. On 31 October 1951 he addressed the assembly for the first time and called on it to frame the states constitution and to give a 'reasoned conclusion regarding accession'.

== Actions ==
On 15 February 1954 the assembly members who were present cast a unanimous vote ratifying the state's accession to India. The constituent assembly was later dissolved. Constitution was drafted which came into force on 26 January 1957. Part II, section (3) of the constitution states 'The State of Jammu and Kashmir is and shall be an integral part of the Union of India'. In 1956 the Constituent Assembly finalised its constitution, which declared the whole of the former Princely State of Jammu and Kashmir to be 'an integral part of the Union of India'. Elections were held the next year for a Legislative Assembly.

== Dissolution ==
The Constituent Assembly adopted and ratified Mir Qasim resolution to dissolve itself on 17 November 1956. According to this resolution, the Constituent Assembly of Jammu and Kashmir ceased to exist on 26 January 1957.
