= M. Patanjali Sastri =

2nd Chief Justice of India from 1951 to 1954

Mandalokathur Patanjali Sastri
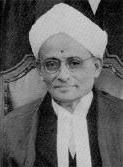

Member of Madras Legislative Council
- In office July 1958 – April 1962

2nd Chief Justice of India
- In office 7 November 1951 – 3 January 1954
- Appointed by: Rajendra Prasad
- Preceded by: H. J. Kania
- Succeeded by: Mehr Chand Mahajan

Judge of Supreme Court of India
- In office 28 January 1950 – 6 November 1951
- Appointed by: Rajendra Prasad

Judge of Federal Court of India
- In office 6 December 1947 – 27 January 1950
- Appointed by: C. Rajagopalachari

Judge of Madras High Court
- In office 15 March 1939 – 5 December 1947
- Appointed by: George VI

Personal details
- Born: 4 January 1889 Mandakolathur, Madras Presidency (present-day Tiruvannamalai, Tamil Nadu, India)
- Died: 16 March 1963 (aged 74) Delhi, India
- Children: 7
- Relatives: Avanidhar Subrahmanyam (great grandson)
- Education: Madras Law College, Madras University

Mandakolathur Patanjali Sastri (4 January 1889 – 16 March 1963) was the second Chief Justice of India, serving in the post from 7 November 1951 to 3 January 1954.

== Early life ==
He was the son of Pandit Krishna Sastri, senior Sanskrit pandit of Pachaiyappa's College, Madras. He graduated in B.A. from Madras University around 1910 before taking an LL.B in 1912 and becoming an advocate.

== Career ==
Sastri began his career as an advocate in the Madras High Court in 1914 and practised for some time, gaining repute as having special expertise in tax law, particularly with Chettiar clients. In 1922, he was appointed standing counsel to the Commissioner of Income Tax in recognition of his abilities in this field; he held the position until his elevation to the Bench of Madras High Court on 15 March 1939. During this time, he, along with Sir Sidney Wadsworth notably tried complicated cases that followed after the passing of the Madras Agriculturists Debt Relief Act. He replaced his close friend Sir Srinivasa Varadachariar, who had been appointed to the Federal Court of India.

On 6 December 1947, by then third in seniority at the Madras High Court, he was made a judge of the Federal Court, which subsequently became the Supreme Court. Following the sudden death of the Chief Justice, Harilal J. Kania, on 6 November 1951, Sastri, as the senior-most associate justice, was appointed as Chief Justice. Sastri served in the position till he reached the retirement age on 3 January 1954.

Over the course of his tenure on the Supreme Court, Sastri authored 75 judgments and was a part of 171 benches. He also took part in the appointment of four judges.

Previously appointed pro-chancellor of Delhi University in 1953, he served in that capacity until 1956. In retirement, Sastri remained active with the Delhi branch of the International Law Association and headed the Airlines Compensation Commission which oversaw the nationalisation of India's airlines. He also served as a member of the board of directors of the Press Trust of India and served on the Madras Legislative Council from July 1958 to April 1962. An eminent Sanskrit scholar and active member of the executive council of Benares Hindu University at the time of his death on 16 March 1963, he had chaired the Central Sanskrit Board since 1959, as well as the Kendriya Sanskrit Vidya Pith at Tirupati. He died at his son-in-law's residence in Delhi from a cardiac arrest. His great grandsons are Avanidhar Subrahmanyam, a Distinguished Professor at the University of California, Los Angeles, and Dr. Mandakulutur Subramanya Ganesh, Head of Oncology, Vydehi Institute of Medical Sciences, Bengaluru.

Legal offices
Preceded by H. J. Kania	Chief Justice of India; 16 November 1951 – 3 January 1954	Succeeded by Mehr Chand Mahajan
