= Mehr Chand Mahajan =

3rd Chief Justice of India

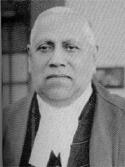
- Mahajan in 1950

3rd Chief Justice of India
- In office 4 January 1954 – 22 December 1954
- Appointed by: Rajendra Prasad
- Preceded by: M. Patanjali Sastri
- Succeeded by: Bijan Kumar Mukherjea

Judge of Supreme Court of India
- In office 28 January 1950 – 3 January 1954
- Appointed by: Rajendra Prasad

Judge of Federal Court of India
- In office 4 October 1948 – 27 January 1950
- Appointed by: C. Rajagopalachari

Prime Minister of Jammu and Kashmir
- In office 15 October 1947 – 5 March 1948
- Monarch: Hari Singh
- Preceded by: Janak Singh
- Succeeded by: Sheikh Abdullah

Judge of Punjab High Court
- In office 15 August 1947 – 3 October 1948
- Appointed by: C. Rajagopalachari

Judge of Lahore High Court
- In office 27 September 1943 – 14 August 1947
- Appointed by: George VI

Personal details
- Born: 23 December 1889 Kangra, Punjab, British India (now in Himachal Pradesh, India)
- Died: 11 December 1967 (aged 77)

Mehr Chand Mahajan (23 December 1889 – 11 December 1967) was an Indian jurist and politician who was the third chief justice of the Supreme Court of India. Prior to that he was the prime minister of the state of Jammu and Kashmir during the reign of Maharaja Hari Singh and played a key role in the accession of the state to India. He was the Indian National Congress nominee on the Radcliffe Commission that defined the boundaries of India and Pakistan.

Mahajan made his name as a lawyer, a respected judge, and a politician. As a judge, he had many leading judgments to his credit.

== Early life ==
Mehr Chand Mahajan was born on 23 December 1889 at Tika Nagrota in the Kangra district of Punjab, British India (now in Himachal Pradesh). His father, Lala Brij Lal, was an advocate, who later established a reputed legal practice at Dharmsala.

After completing middle school, Mahajan went to study in the Government College, Lahore, graduating in 1910. He enrolled in M.Sc. Chemistry, but switched to law following persuasion from his father. He earned an LL.B. degree in 1912.

== Career as a lawyer ==
Mahajan started his career as a lawyer in 1913 in Dharamsala, where he spent a year practising. He spent the next four years (1914-1918) as a lawyer in Gurdaspur. He then practiced law in Lahore from 1918 to 1943. During his time there, he served as president of the High Court Bar Association of Lahore (1938 to 1943).

== Justice of Punjab and Haryana High Court ==
He became a Justice in the pre-independence Lahore High Court on 27.9.1943. After independence, he became judge of East Punjab High Court now known as Punjab and Haryana High Court. While he was serving there, the Maharaja of Jammu and Kashmir called him to become his Prime Minister for the negotiations regarding merger with India on 15.10.1947.

== Prime Minister of Jammu and Kashmir ==
Mahajan visited Kashmir on invitation of the Maharani Tara Devi in September 1947 and was asked to be the Prime Minister of Jammu and Kashmir which he accepted. On 15 October 1947, Mahajan was appointed the Prime Minister of Jammu & Kashmir and played a role in the accession of the state to India. Jammu & Kashmir acceded to India in October 1947 and Mahajan thus became the 1st Prime Minister of the Indian state of Jammu and Kashmir, serving in that post until 5 March 1948.

== Chief Justice, Supreme Court of India ==
Mahajan took office as the third Chief Justice of India on 4 January 1954. He was the head of India's judicial system for almost a year, until his retirement on 22 December 1954 (mandatory retirement at age 65). Before becoming Chief Justice he served as one of the first Judges of the Supreme Court of independent India from 4 October 1948 to 3 January 1954.

Over the course of his tenure on the Supreme Court, Mahajan authored 132 judgments and was a part of 337 benches.

== Other positions of note ==
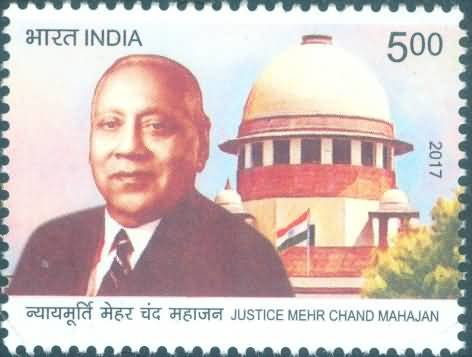
Stamp of India 2017 Mehr Chand Mahajan 3rd Chief Justice of India

- Director, Punjab National Bank, 1933–43
- Pres. D.A.V. College, Managing Committee, 1938–43
- Fellow and Syndic, Punjab University, 1940–47
- Judge, Lahore High Court, 1943
- All India Fruit Products Association Bombay Session, 1945
- Member, R.I.N. Mutiny Commission, 1946
- 1947 Dewan of Jammu and Kashmir State 1947-48
- Judge, East Punjab High Court
- Punjab Boundary Commission, 1947
- Syndic, East Punjab University, 1947–50
- Constitutional Adviser to His Highness the Maharaja of Bikaner, 1948
- Hon. Degree of LL.D., Punjab University; 1948
- Member, Fruit Development Board, Punjab
- Commission on Belgaum (dispute between Karnataka and Maharashtra), 1967

Political offices
Preceded by Janak Singh	Prime Minister of Jammu and Kashmir; 1947–1948	Succeeded by Sheikh Abdullah

Legal offices
Preceded by M. Patanjali Sastri	Chief Justice of India; 3 January 1954 – 22 December 1954	Succeeded by Bijan Kumar Mukherjea
