= Tara Devi of Jammu and Kashmir =

Queen Tara Devi
- Queen Consort of Kashmir

Queen Consort of Kashmir
- Tenure: 4 August 1927 — 17 November 1952
- Born: 1910; Bijapur, Kingdom of Kangra, Empire of India
- Died: 1967 (aged 56–57); Amar Mahal Palace, Jammu, State of Kashmir, Republic of India
- Spouse: Hari Singh I of Kashmir (m. 1927, sep. 1950 – 1961; his death)
- Issue: Karan Singh, Crown Prince of Kashmir
- House: House of Katoch; House of Dogra-Kashmir (by marriage)
- Father: Prince Bali Ram Chandra Katoch

Tara Devi (1910–1967) was an Indian queen as Consort of the Indian princely state of Kashmir, the fourth wife of Maharaja Hari Singh I and mother of Crown Prince Karan Singh.

== Early life ==
As a child, she once nearly drowned but was saved by her brother, Nichint Chand. In 1925, Janak Singh Katoch, Major General and Revenue Minister under Maharaja Hari Singh, was entrusted with the task of finding a suitable bride for the Maharaja. The search began among their relatives and was later guided by suggestions from Mian Onkar Chand Mankotia of Tiara and Colonel Devi Singh Pathania of Rey, who recommended a beautiful young woman whose horoscope was found to be an ideal match.

== Biography ==
On the esteemed date of 4 August 1927, in adherence to astrological guidance, Maharaja Hari Singh entered into his fourth matrimonial alliance through the distinguished tradition of "marriage by proxy." This sacred union, solemnized with a commoner, was orchestrated to ensure divine blessings and enduring success, reflecting the wisdom and grandeur of the era.

Due to suspicions surrounding the deaths of Maharaja Hari Singh's previous wives during childbirth, Maharani Tara was provided the best medical care away from potential court intrigues in Jammu and Kashmir.

On 9 March 1931, Maharani Tara gave birth to Karan Singh. For the occasion, Hari Singh had reserved the entire third floor of the Hôtel Martinez in Cannes, France, where their son was born in Suite 318-319-320.

Maharani Tara was the first Maharani to appear in public without purdah. She was simple, gentle, and loving, yet she actively fought against social evils. She supported Maharaja Hari Singh’s efforts to combat caste discrimination in her own way.

Maharani Tara, along with her brother Nichint Chand and Swami Sant Dev, held significant influence and played a key role in persuading Maharaja Hari Singh to favour their choice over Pandit Ram Chandra Kak (28 June 1945 - 11 August 1947), P.M, who was believed to be hesitant about the accession to India.

As part of this effort, they first facilitated the appointment of Janak Singh Katoch (11 August 1947 – 14 October 1947) and later, ensured that Mehr Chand Mahajan (15 October 1947 – 5 March 1948) was appointed as Prime Minister of Jammu and Kashmir (princely state), who was more aligned with India regarding accession.

In the chilling autumn of 1947, as tribal raiders marched toward Kashmir, whispers of fear echoed through its valleys. But within the royal quarters, Tara Devi was not one to remain silent. Aware that women and gold were the invaders’ chief plunder, she rallied young girls, teaching them to fight, to stand, and to survive. In that moment, a queen became a guardian. As refugees poured in Jammu, she founded Maharani Seva Dal, providing them with food and shelter. Amidst the turmoil, she personally stayed with the refugees, offering help in every possible way.

With Sheikh Abdullah released from jail and installed as Prime Minister of the ‘troubled’ state, he aligned with Jawaharlal Nehru to sideline the Maharaja, removing any parallel authority from the Centre’s path. Years later, the Maharani’s only son, Dr. Karan Singh, reflected on the situation in his book Heir Apparent – Part 1:

“Plebiscite being the dominant theme of the time, it became Sheikh Abdullah’s trump card. As the man expected to deliver the plebiscite in India’s favour, he was in a position to demand his pound of flesh. Jawaharlal Nehru and my father were never particularly close, and Sheikh Abdullah managed to convince him that as long as my father remained in the state, winning the plebiscite would be impossible.”

Though it was originally agreed that the Maharani would stay with the Yuvraj in the State, Sardar Vallabhbhai Patel, in a letter dated 23 May 1949 from Dehradun, informed the Maharaja that this arrangement would not be possible. Instead, she would be permitted to visit the Yuvraj occasionally.

Outnumbered and isolated, Sardar Patel advised the Maharaja to abdicate in favour of his son and stay out of the state for a few months, citing health reasons. The Maharaja responded pointedly, noting that Kashmir was itself a health resort and suggesting he be given a suitable role in Delhi. He pleaded that since the Yuvraj was young and impressionable, either parent should be allowed to stay with him, and questioned the fairness of separating a mother from her only child after thirteen months apart. Patel, reportedly under Nehru’s influence, replied that the mother could visit occasionally, and the son could also visit his parents, adding discreetly that the duration of the Maharaja’s absence need not be specified. Eventually, on 9 June 1949, Hari Singh abdicated to Bombay in favor of their son Karan Singh, Tara Devi stayed nearer to Jammu to uphold the Dogra royal legacy and relocated to Kasauli, where Margaret, the English wife of ex-Prime Minister of J&K Ram Chandra Kak also took up residence.

In 1950, radical land reforms like the Big Landed Estates Abolition Act stripped royal and feudal families of their lands, weakening their socio-economic status and prompting her to buy a modest house in her maternal village in Himachal Pradesh, now known as Taragarh Palace in her honour.

In 1953, shifting government policies led her to remain at Amar Mahal in Jammu to uphold her role as Queen Mother, maintain the royal family’s presence, and support the accession narrative—where she lived until her death in 1967, and which now stands as a museum.

== Legacy ==
- On 1 June 1944 Maharani Mahila College Parade Ground was started by Retd. Conservator Forest Lala Mulkh Raj Gandotra exclusively for woman with patronization of Maharani Tara. On 25 November 1953 its name was changed to Government College for Women, Parade Ground, Jammu and was fully funded by J&K Government.
- Maharani Tara Devi made Amar Mahal her residence in Jammu in 1927 and lived there until her death in 1967, her son Dr. Karan Singh and his wife converted the palace into a museum, inaugurated by PM Indira Gandhi on April 13, 1975. The museum aimed to preserve rare art and literature, collaborating with fine arts institutions. The property was subsequently transferred to the Hari Tara Charitable Trust to enliven the memory of the last king and queen who once lived there.
- Taragarh Palace now a heritage hotel in Himachal Pradesh stands as a symbol of royal grace and resilience, it was also intended as a refuge for her in case she was ever forced to leave Jammu.
- Tara Niwas in Udhampur, once one of her residences, has retained its original name and is presently being used as a state guest house by the Hospitality & Protocol Department of the Jammu and Kashmir (union territory). It is the same location where Sheikh Mohammad Abdullah was placed under house arrest on 19 August 1953.
- The samadhi (memorial) of Maharani Tara Devi, wife of Maharaja Hari Singh and mother of Dr. Karan Singh, stands beside those of other Dogra queens near the Raghunath Temple complex in Jammu.

== Honours ==
- United Kingdom: Companion of the Order of the Crown

Queen Tara Devi House of Katoch Born: 1910 Died: 1967
Indian royalty
Vacant Title last held by Princess Bishen Devi of Chamba	Queen Consort of Kashmir; 4 August 1927 — 17 November 1952	Monarchy abolished Kashmir conflict
