= Bijan Kumar Mukherjea =

4th Chief Justice of India

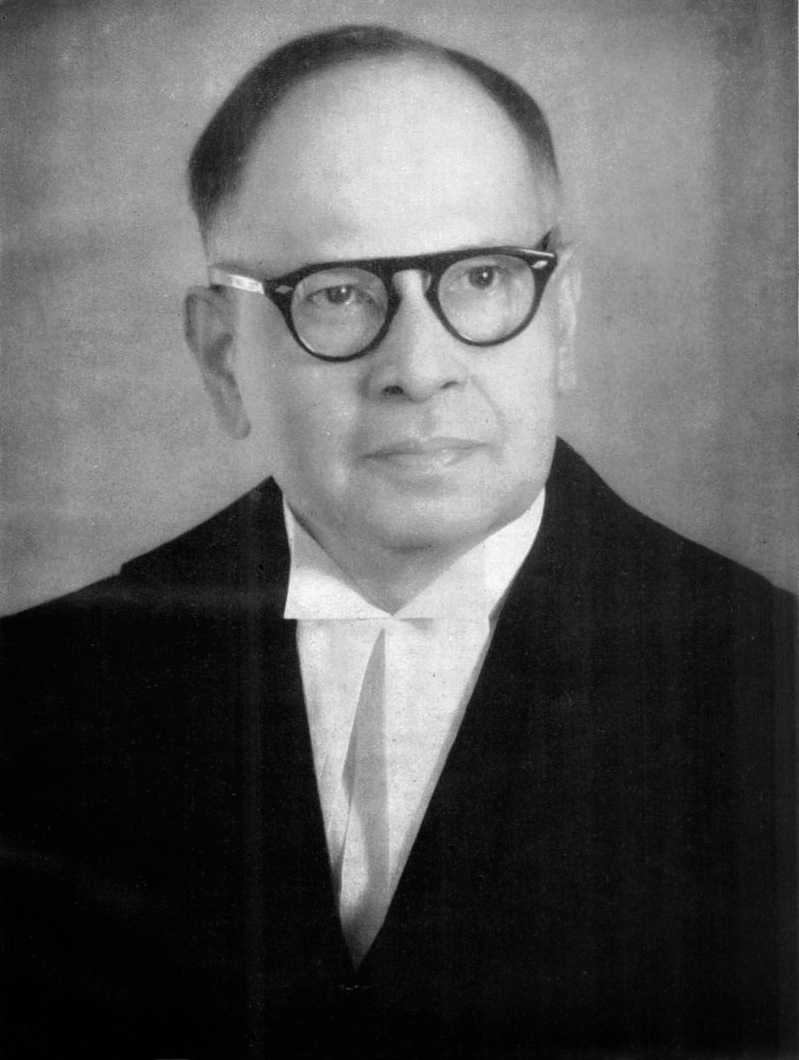

4th Chief Justice of India
- In office 23 December 1954 – 31 January 1956
- Appointed by: Rajendra Prasad
- Preceded by: Mehr Chand Mahajan
- Succeeded by: Sudhi Ranjan Das

Judge of Supreme Court of India
- In office 28 January 1950 – 22 December 1954
- Appointed by: Rajendra Prasad

Judge of Federal Court of India
- In office 14 October 1948 – 27 January 1950
- Appointed by: C. Rajagopalachari

Judge of Calcutta High Court
- In office 8 July 1936 – 13 October 1948
- Appointed by: Edward VIII

Personal details
- Born: 15 August 1891
- Died: 22 February 1956 (aged 64)
- Education: MA, (History); LLB, (Gold Medalist); LLM, (Gold Medalist); LLD
- Alma mater: Hooghly Branch Government School, Hooghly Mohsin College, Surendranath Law College, University of Calcutta

Bijan Kumar Mukherjea (Bengali: বিজন কুমার মুখার্জী; 15 August 1891 – 22 February 1956) was an Indian judge, who served as the 4th Chief Justice of India. He was in office from 22 December 1954 to 31 January 1956.

== Avocation ==
Joined Calcutta Bar in 1914 Junior Govt. Pleader Calcutta High Court, 1934 Senior Govt. Pleader, Calcutta Court, 1936.

He was appointed as Judge of Calcutta High Court on 8 July 1936. Member Bengal Boundary Commission, 1947 Judge, Federal Court/Supreme Court 14 October 1948 - 22 December 1954.Chief Justice of India 23 December 1954 - 31 January 1956

On Patanjali Sastri's retirement in January 1954, Nehru had asked B.K. Mukherjea to take over as Chief Justice. However Mukherjea declined, saying that Mehr Chand Mahajan was his senior. When Nehru pressed him, the judge said he would sooner resign than usurp the highest office before his turn. Only after Mahajan retired did Mukherjea become CJI. His time as CJI ended prematurely as he suffered from heart ailments that forced his retirement.

Over the course of his tenure on the Supreme Court, Mukherjea authored 87 judgments.

== Education and academics ==
After completing his education at Hooghly Branch Government School, and Hooghly Mohasin College, Hooghly, West Bengal, he joined the Surendranath Law College under the University of Calcutta.

He had an M.A. (History) with a specialization in Ancient Indian History, a B.L. (Gold Medalist), an M.L. (Gold Medalist), and a Doctor of Law.

He was Anauth Dev Research Prizeman, Tagore Law Lecturer (Calcutta University), and also a Saraswati (Sanskrit).

== Personal life ==
Mukherjea was born to Rakhal Das Mukherjee and Sarat Kumari Devi. Rakhal Das had graduated from Scottish Church College (also popularly called Duf's College), Calcutta, to become a Vakil. Bijan grew up in his maternal home ("Rose Villa", Hooghly District, West Bengal, India). He had an elder sister (Sheila) and a younger brother, Bipin, who died at the age of ten.

He married Labanyalata Devi and had a son Amiya Kumar Mookerji. Labanya died when Amiya was barely two. Amiya studied at St. Paul's School, Kolkata and Scottish Church College, Kolkata. He followed his father's vocation to become a judge of the Calcutta High Court, although the former had refused the position of Supreme Court judge because of health issues. Bijan Kumar's granddaughter, Meera Ganguli (née Mookerji) died in 2022. Mukherjea was survived by his great-grandson Anjan Ganguli and great-granddaughter in law, Reena Kohli Ganguli.

Mukherjea has his ancestral house in Mukherjee Lodge, at Judge Para, Jognath Tala, Ishan Banerjee Lane, Nabadwip, Dist. Nadia, West Bengal, and is a descendant of Krittibas Ojha (the translator and adapter of the first Bengali version of Valmiki's Ramayana) and a first cousin of Prangopal Mukherjee, whose son, Govinda Gopal Mukherjee, became a professor and researcher in philosophy and Sanskrit studies, and a singer of devotional songs in Bengali and Sanskrit.

B. K. Mukherjea and his cousin Prangopal Mukerjee were both disciples of Sri Sri Balananda Brahmachari of Deogharh, Jharkhand, and often visited Balanandaji's Tapovan Ashram at Deogharh.

== Memberships and association ==
- Fellow of the Calcutta University
- President of the Bengal Sanskrit Association
- Associated with Scouts Movement in Bengal
- Acted as District Commissioner, South Calcutta Boys Sc Association
- Connected with Literary and Cultural Society Bibudha Janani Sava, Nabadwip, Gita Sava, Calcutta, St. Sahitya Parishad; Calcutta etc.

== Publication ==
- Problems & Law
- Hindu Law of Religious and Charitable Trusts

Legal offices
Preceded by Mehr Chand Mahajan	Chief Justice of India; 22 December 1954 – 31 January 1956	Succeeded by Sudhi Ranjan Das
