= Standstill agreement (India) =

Incorporation treaty for Princely states into India and Pakistan

A standstill agreement was an agreement signed between the newly independent dominions of India and Pakistan and the princely states of the British Indian Empire prior to their integration in the new dominions. The form of the agreement was bilateral between a dominion and a princely state. It provided that all the administrative arrangements, existing between the British Crown and the state would continue unaltered between the signatory dominion (India or Pakistan) and the princely state, until new arrangements were made.

== Prior to independence ==
The draft of the standstill agreement was formulated soon after 3 June 1947 by the Political department of the British Indian government. The agreement provided that all the administrative arrangements of 'common concern' then existing between the British Crown and any particular signatory state would continue unaltered between the signatory dominion (India or Pakistan) and the state until new arrangements were made. A separate schedule was to specify these matters of common concern. During discussion, Jawaharlal Nehru, the future Prime Minister of India, doubted if the agreement should cover only 'administrative' matters. Mohammad Ali Jinnah, the future Governor General of Pakistan, gave his view that it should be so.

The standstill agreement was separate from the Instrument of Accession, later formulated by the States Department of the future dominion of India, which was a legal document that involved a surrender of sovereignty to the extent specified in the Instrument. (Note: The States Department of the dominion of Pakistan did not support the concept of accession. Jinhah declared that he would guarantee independence of the princely states that adhered to Pakistan.)

Both the draft agreements were presented to the Chamber of Princes on 25 July. A States Negotiating Committee was formed to discuss both the agreements, consisting of ten rulers and twelve ministers. After discussion, the Committee finalised both the draft agreements on 31 July.

Some native rulers of the princely states attempted to buy time by stating that they would sign the Standstill agreement but not the Instrument of Accession until they had time to decide. In response, the Indian government took the position that it would sign standstill agreements with only those states that acceded. By 15 August 1947, the appointed deadline and the day of Indian independence, all but four princely states interior to India, some 560 of them, signed both the Instrument of Accession and Standstill agreement with India. The exceptions were Hyderabad, a large state in the centre of South India that received an extension for a period of two months, and three small states in Gujarat: Junagadh and its subsidiaries (Mangrol and Babariawad).

The state of Junagadh executed Instrument of Accession as well as Standstill agreement with Pakistan on 15 August. It was accepted by Pakistan on 13 September. Junagadh was the only state that declared accession to Pakistan by 15 August.

The state of Jammu and Kashmir, which was contiguous to both India and Pakistan, decided to remain independent. It offered to sign standstill agreements with both of the dominions. Pakistan immediately accepted, but India asked for further discussions.

The Khanate of Kalat, at the western periphery of Pakistan, also decided to remain independent. It signed a standstill agreement with Pakistan.

== Jammu and Kashmir ==
Jammu and Kashmir at the far north of the Indian subcontinent had contiguous borders with both India and Pakistan, and was theoretically in a position to accede to either of them. However, by July 1947, Maharaja Hari Singh had decided to accede to neither and remain independent. Ostensibly, he assessed that the State's Muslims would be unhappy with accession to India, and the Hindus and Sikhs would become vulnerable if he joined Pakistan. However, on 11 August, the Maharaja dismissed his prime minister Ram Chandra Kak, who had advocated independence. This action was interpreted by observers as a tilt towards accession to India.

The new prime minister, Major Janak Singh, sent telegrams to both India and Pakistan on 12 August expressing the State's intention to sign standstill agreements with them. (Note: Text of Jammu and Kashmir's telegram: "Jammu and Kashmir Government would welcome Standstill Agreement with India (Pakistan) on all matters on which these exist at present moment with outgoing British Government. It is suggested that existing arrangements should continue pending settlement of details and formal execution of fresh agreement.") The Government of Pakistan replied telegraphically on 14 August confirming that the status quo would be maintained. (Note: Text of Pakistan's telegram: "Your telegram of 12th. The Government of Pakistan agree to have a Standstill Agreement with the Government of Jammu and Kashmir for the continuance of the existing arrangements pending settlement of details and formal execution.") According to Christopher Birdwood, no formal agreement was ever signed. However, the Government of Pakistan later interpreted this telegraphic agreement as giving it the status of the former British Indian government in its relations with the state. The Government of India welcomed the State's intention and requested a ministerial representative to be sent to Delhi for negotiating the agreement, but this was apparently not followed up by the State. (Note: Text of India's telegram: "Government of India would be glad if you or some other minister duly authorized in this behalf could fly to Delhi for negotiating Standstill Agreement between Kashmir Government and India Dominion. Early action desirable to maintain intact the existing arrangements.") Years later, the state's political leader Sheikh Abdullah offered the explanation that the Government of India did not consider that any agreement would be valid unless it had the approval of people's representatives.

The telegraphic agreement bound the Government of Pakistan to continue the existing administrative arrangements with regard to communications, supplies and postal and telegraphic services. The State's postal and telegraphic services, which were formerly part of the Punjab provincial services based in Lahore, were taken over by Pakistan. On 15 August, when Pakistan became independent, Pakistani flags were hoisted on most of the post offices until the Maharaja's government ordered them to be taken down.

== Hyderabad State ==
The Nizam of Hyderabad, who had previously received a three-month extension to agree new arrangements with the Dominion of India, wrote to the Government of India on 18 September that he was willing to make a treaty of association with India. But he maintained that an accession would lead to disturbance and bloodshed in the state. On 11 October, Hyderabad sent a delegation to Delhi with a draft Standstill agreement, which was characterised as "elaborate" by V. P. Menon, the secretary of the States Department. The States minister Vallabhbhai Patel rejected any agreement that would not completely cede Defence and External affairs to the Government of India. Upon the advice of Governor General Louis Mountbatten, Menon prepared a new draft agreement which was sent back with the Hyderabad delegation. The Executive Council of the Nizam discussed the agreement and approved it with six votes to three. Nizam expressed acceptance but delayed signing the agreement.

Soon the Nizam came under pressure from Majlis-e-Ittehadul Muslimeen (Ittehad), the Muslim nationalist party that was active in the state, and backed off from the agreement. On the morning of 27 October, Qasim Rizvi, the leader of Ittehad, organised a massive demonstration of several thousand activists to blockade the delegation's departure. He persuaded the Nizam that, since India was then tied up with in Kashmir, it had insufficient resources to pressure Hyderabad. He claimed that an agreement considerably more favourable to Hyderabad was possible. The Nizam then appointed a new delegation dominated by the Executive Council members that opposed the previous agreement. Former Hyderabad bureaucrat Mohammed Hyder called this event the "October Coup". From this point on, Qasim Rizvi began to call the shots in the Hyderabad administration.

The new delegation secured only trivial amendments to the earlier draft of the agreement. It laid down that all agreements and administrative arrangements then existing between the British Crown and the Nizam would continue with the Government of India. These included defence, external affairs and communications (the three subjects normally covered in the Instrument of Accession). Agents would be exchanged between Hyderabad and India. The Government of India agreed to renounce the functions of paramountcy. The Standstill agreement was to remain in force for a period of one year. The agreement was signed by the Nizam on 29 November 1947.

Significantly, the agreement did not provide for the Dominion of India to station Indian forces in the state, whereas British India had maintained various cantonments, particularly in Secunderabad, as part of its "subsidiary alliance" with state. Over the course of the next 6 months, the Indian troops were withdrawn from the state.

According to K. M. Munshi, who was appointed as India's Agent General in Hyderabad, Indians felt that entering into a Standstill agreement with Hyderabad meant that India had lost its grip on Hyderabad affairs. The Hyderabad State Congress opposed it because it was seen as a sign of weakness by the government of India. V. P. Menon has stated that Nizam and his advisers viewed the agreement as providing breathing space during which the Indian troops would be withdrawn and the state could build up its position so as to assert independence.

Hyderabad was accused of violating clauses of the agreement: in external affairs, by carrying out intrigues with Pakistan, to which it secretly loaned 15 million pounds; in defence, by building up a large semi-private army; in communications, by interfering with the traffic at the borders and the through traffic of Indian railways. India was also accused of violating the agreement by imposing an economic blockade. It turned out that the state of Bombay was interfering with supplies to Hyderabad without the knowledge of Delhi. The Government promised to take up the matter with the provincial governments, but scholar Lucien Benichou states that it was never done. India also delayed arms shipments to Hyderabad from India, which was later claimed to be a breach of the standstill agreement.

More seriously, the Ittehad promoted vast armed bands of razakars who threatened communal peace inside the state as well as along the border. After multiple rounds of negotiations, the government of India delivered an ultimatum on 31 August 1948, demanding a ban on the razakars and the stationing of Indian troops in the state to keep law and order. When these were denied, India invaded the state on 13 September sending in troops via three access routes. The Nizam after four days had agreed to Indian demands.

Subsequently, he signed the Instrument of Accession in November 1948.

== Bibliography ==
- Behera, Navnita Chadha (2007), Demystifying Kashmir, Pearson Education India, ISBN 978-8131708460
- Benichou, Lucien D. (2000) [University of Western Australia, 1985], From Autocracy to Integration: Political Developments in Hyderabad State, 1938-1948, Orient Blackswan, ISBN 978-81-250-1847-6
- Bhandari, Mohan C. (2006), Solving Kashmir, Lancer Publishers, ISBN 978-81-7062-125-6
- Birdwood, Lord (1956), Two Nations and Kashmir, R. Hale – via archive.org
- Chandra, Bipan; Mukherjee, Aditya; Mukherjee, Mridula (2008) [first published 1999], India since Independence, Penguin Books India, ISBN 978-0-14-310409-4
- Hodson, H. V. (1969), The Great Divide: Britain, India, Pakistan, London: Hutchinson, ISBN 9780090971503
- Hyder, Mohammed (2012), October Coup, A Memoir of the Struggle for Hyderabad, Roli Books, ISBN 978-8174368508
- Kamat, Manjiri N. (2007), "Border incidents, internal disorder and the nizam's claim for an independent Hyderabad", in Waltraud Ernst; Biswamoy Pati (eds.), India's Princely States: People, Princes and Colonialism, Routledge, pp. 212–224, ISBN 978-1-134-11988-2
- Menon, V. P. (1956), The Story of Integration of the Indian States, Orient Longman, archived from the original on 8 December 2019 – via Questia
- Raghavan, Srinath (2010), War and Peace in Modern India, Palgrave Macmillan, ISBN 978-1-137-00737-7
- Schofield, Victoria (2003) [First published in 2000], Kashmir in Conflict, London and New York: I. B. Taurus & Co, ISBN 1860648983
