= Kashmir Singh Katoch =

Indian army general

Lieutenant General K S Katoch MC
- Born: 15 July 1915; Srinagar, Jammu and Kashmir, British India
- Died: 25 April 2007 (aged 91)
- Military career
- Allegiance: J & K State; British India; India
- Branch: British Indian Army; Indian Army
- Service years: 1936 - 1970
- Rank: Lieutenant General
- Commands: XV Corps
- Conflicts: World War II; Indo-Pakistani War of 1965; Kashmir conflict
- Awards: Padma Bhushan; Military Cross

Lieutenant General Kashmir Singh Katoch, MC (15 July 1915 – 25 April 2007) was an Indian Army General and military adviser to the Maharaja Hari Singh of Jammu and Kashmir, officiating as the Chief of Staff of the State Forces during the Indo-Pakistani War of 1947. He later served as the Vice Chief of Army Staff of the Indian Army.

== Life and career ==
Katoch was born in 1915 in Srinagar to Janak Singh, an officer of the Jammu and Kashmir State Forces, later a prime minister of Jammu and Kashmir.

He did his military training at the Indian Military Academy, Dehradun, completing the course in 1936. After commissioning he was attached to the 1st battalion, East Surrey Regiment for a year. He was posted to the 6th battalion Frontier Force Rifles (FFR, now the first Frontier Force Regiment of Pakistan) on 10 August 1937. On 19 April 1942 he was attached to the 10th (training) battalion Frontier Force Rifles and by October 1942 held the rank of Lieutenant, war substantive Captain and temporary Major.

He fought in World War II, commanding the Dogra Company of 6th battalion Frontier Force Rifles. The battalion served in Italy and fought in the Battle of Monte Cassino. When the Pathan company got severely mauled, the Dogra company cleared many of the machine gun nests. Katoch was awarded the Military Cross.

Katoch became a Lieutenant Colonel in the British Indian Army at the age of 31.

=== Jammu and Kashmir State Forces ===
After General Henry Lawrence Scott, the Chief of Staff of Kashmir State Forces, decided to relinquish his post in September 1947, the Maharaja requested the Government of India to second an officer to head the State Forces. Kashmir Singh Katoch, then a Colonel, was chosen for the job. However, Katoch felt that he was too junior to serve as the Chief of Staff and advised the Maharaja to appoint a senior officer such as Brigadier Rajinder Singh. Katoch was then appointed as a 'military adviser' to the Maharaja. However, Brigadier Rajinder Singh was killed in action within the first few days of the Pakistani tribal invasion,

With the accession of the State to the Indian Union on 26–27 October 1947, the State Forces came under the command of the Indian Army. Colonel Katoch officiated as the commanding officer of the State Forces.

=== Indian Army ===
On 18 November 1950, still only 35 years old, Katoch was promoted to acting brigadier and given command of a brigade. He was promoted to colonel on 1 September 1955, and to brigadier on 1 September 1958. He was promoted to major-general on 1 September 1960, and was appointed chairman, Permanent Joint Planning Committee on 4 February 1963. He was promoted to acting lieutenant-general on 1 May 1963 and appointed the Adjutant General of the Indian Army, with promotion to the substantive rank on 23 November.

He subsequently commanded the XV Corps in the Kashmir Valley. It was the main force that fought against Pakistan's Operation Gibraltar during the Indo-Pakistani War of 1965.

=== Later life ===
On 8 June 1966, Katoch was appointed Vice Chief of the Army Staff (VCOAS). He retired in 1970, and died on 25 April 2007.

== Honours ==
The Government of India awarded Gen Katoch the third highest civilian honour, the Padma Bhushan, in 1965,

== See also ==
- Janak Singh
- Hari Singh
- Indian Military Academy

== Bibliography ==
- Bhattacharya, Brigadier Samir (2013), NOTHING BUT!: Book Three: What Price Freedom, Partridge Publishing, ISBN 978-1-4828-1625-9

Military offices
Preceded by S. D. Verma	General Officer Commanding XV Corps; 1963-1966	Succeeded by Kashmir Singh Katoch
Preceded by Bikram Singh	Vice Chief of Army Staff; 1966-1970	Succeeded by Sartaj Singh
