= Patrick Spens =

Patrick Spens may refer to:

- Patrick Spens, 1st Baron Spens (1885–1973)
- Sir Patrick Spens, an old ballad
