= Varadachariar =

Varadachariar is an Indian surname. Notable people with the surname include:

- Srinivas Varadachariar (1881–1970), Indian jurist
- Tiger Varadachariar (1876–1950), Carnatic music vocalist
