= Hooghly Branch Government School =

Hooghly Branch (Govt) School

Location
- Chawk Bazar, Hooghly; Hughli-Chuchura, West Bengal, 712103; India; 22.9077673°N 88.3980147°E

Information
- Type: Public
- Motto: Satyam, Shivam, Sundaram (Truth, Spirituality, Beauty)
- Established: 1834
- School board: WBBSE & WBCHSE
- Authority: Government of West Bengal
- Category: Higher Secondary
- Gender: Boys
- Campus: Urban
- Affiliations: Department of Higher Education, Government of West Bengal
- Website: www.hooghlybranchgovtschool.org

Hooghly Branch Government School (or Hooghly Branch (Govt) School), established in 1834, is one of the oldest schools in West Bengal. It is located in Chawk Bazar, Hooghly, within the area of Hooghly-Chinsurah Municipality.

The school is administered by the state government of West Bengal and admits only males. The School has two sessions, morning and day session. Students are taught from class 1 to class 12.

The school's primary medium of instruction is Bengali and English is second language. However, on the higher secondary section, people are allowed to choose the medium of instruction as English.

== Notable alumni ==
- Sankar Basu, electrical engineer and contributor to US science policy
- Sarat Chandra Chattopadhyay, Bengali novelist
- Bijan Kumar Mukherjea, 4th Chief Justice of India
- Surajit Sengupta, Footballer

== See also ==
- Education in India
- List of schools in India
- Education in West Bengal
