= H. J. Kania =

1st Chief Justice of India

Sir Harilal Jekisundas Kania
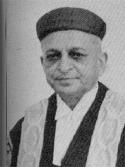

1st Chief Justice of India
- In office 28 January 1950 – 6 November 1951
- President: Rajendra Prasad
- Preceded by: Position established
- Succeeded by: M. Patanjali Sastri

Chief Justice of Federal Court of India
- In office 15 August 1947 – 27 January 1950
- Appointed by: Lord Mountbatten
- Preceded by: Patrick Spens
- Succeeded by: Position abolished

Judge of Federal Court of India
- In office 20 June 1946 – 15 August 1947
- Appointed by: Lord Wavell
- Chief Justice: Patrick Spens

Associate Judge of Bombay High Court
- In office June 1933 – 19 June 1946
- Appointed by: Lord Willingdon
- Chief Justice: John Beaumont

Additional Judge of Bombay High Court
- In office June 1931 – March 1933
- Appointed by: Lord Willingdon
- Chief Justice: John Beaumont

Personal details
- Born: 3 November 1890 Navsari, British India (now in Gujarat, India)
- Died: 6 November 1951 (aged 61) New Delhi, India
- Party: INC (1923–1926)
- Spouse: Kusum Mehta
- Relations: M. H. Kania (Nephew)
- Education: Government Law College, Mumbai, (LLB, LLM)

Sir Harilal Jekisundas "H. J." Kania (3 November 1890 – 6 November 1951) was the first Chief Justice of India. He served as the Chief Justice of India from 1950 until his death in office in 1951.

== Early life and education ==
Kania was born in a middle-class family at Surat. His grandfather had been a revenue officer in Gujarat with the British Government, and his father Jekisundas Kania was a Sanskrit professor and later principal of Samaldas College in the princely state of Bhavnagar. His elder brother Hiralal Jekisundas Kania was also a barrister whose son Madhukar Hiralal Kania became a Supreme Court judge in 1987, and subsequently Chief Justice. Kania took his BA from Samaldas College in 1910, followed by an LLB from Government Law College, Bombay in 1912 and an LLM from the same institution in 1913.

== Law career ==
Kania began to practise as a barrister at the Bombay High Court in 1915, subsequently marrying Kusum Mehta, the daughter of Sir Chunilal Mehta, sometime member of the executive council of the Governor of Bombay."

For a time, Kania served as acting editor of the Indian Law Reports. Briefly serving as an acting judge on the Bombay High Court in 1930, he was appointed an additional judge on the same court in June 1931, serving until March 1933. Kania then returned to the bar for three months until he was promoted to associate judge in June. Kania was knighted in the 1943 Birthday Honours list.

By then the most senior associate judge at the High Court, he was intended to succeed Chief Justice Sir John Beaumont upon the latter's retirement; however, as Beaumont was biased against Indians, he passed Kania over in favour of the next in line, Sir John Stone. While Stone was personally against Kania being passed over, he accepted Beaumont's nomination. However, Kania served as acting chief justice from May–September 1944, and from June–October 1945. He was promoted to associate judge of the Federal Court of India, then headed by Sir Patrick Spens (later Lord Spens) on 20 June 1946. Spens retired on 14 August 1947, and Kania succeeded him as Chief Justice.

== Supreme Court (1950-1951) ==
After India became a republic on 26 January 1950, Kania was appointed the first Chief Justice of the Supreme Court of India. Acting as Chief Justice, he read the oath to the first President of India, Rajendra Prasad. He died while in office of a sudden heart attack on 6 November 1951, aged 61. Over the course of his Supreme Court tenure, Kania authored 30 judgments and took part in 68 benches.

In A. K. Gopalan v. State of Madras (1950), the first Fundamental Rights case heard by the Indian Supreme Court, Kania was in the 5-1 majority that upheld the validity of the Preventive Detention Act, 1950 and held that it did not violate the rights of the citizen under Article 19(1)(d) and Article 21 of the Constitution. It ruled that Indian courts are not required to apply a due process of law standard by the Article 21 of the Constitution.

Parliament passed the First Amendment to the Constitution, adding restrictions to free speech and other Fundamental Rights. This was in response to judgments from the Kania-led Supreme Court, such as Romesh Thapar v. State of Madras (1950) and Brij Bhushan v. State of Delhi (1950).

Legal offices
Preceded by Patrick Spens	Chief Justice of the Federal Court of India	Succeeded by himself as Chief Justice of India
Preceded by Chief Justice of the Federal Court of India	Chief Justice of India; 15 August 1947–6 November 1951	Succeeded by M. Patanjali Sastri
