= William Spens, 2nd Baron Spens =

William George Michael Spens, 2nd Baron Spens, QC (18 September 1914 – 23 November 1984) was a British peer.

Spens was the eldest son of Patrick Spens, 1st Baron Spens and his first wife, Hilda. He served with the 97th (Kent Yeomanry) Field Brigade, was promoted to Second Lieutenant in 1936 and transferred to the Royal Artillery in 1938. On 30 June 1941, Spens married Joan Goodall (died 1994) and they had three children:

- Patrick Michael Rex (1942–2001)
- William David Ralph (born 1943)
- Mallowry Ann (born 1949)

In the Queen's Birthday Honours of 1954, Spens, as a Temporary Senior Executive Officer of the Control Commission for Germany, was appointed a Member of the Order of the British Empire (MBE).

On the death of Spens' father in 1973, he inherited the barony of Spens and on his own death in 1984, the title passed to his eldest son, Patrick.

His MBE honour was revoked in 1975, following his sentencing a year earlier, to two years in jail for stealing money from the Federation of British Carpet Manufacturers, a company he founded and of which he was a director.

Peerage of the United Kingdom
Preceded by Patrick Spens	Baron Spens; 1973–1984	Succeeded by Patrick Spens
