= M. H. Kania =

23rd Chief Justice of India

Madhukar Hiralal Kania
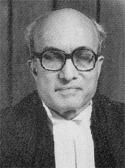

23rd Chief Justice of India
- In office 13 December 1991 – 17 November 1992
- Appointed by: Ramaswamy Venkataraman
- Preceded by: K.N. Singh
- Succeeded by: L.M. Sharma

Judge of Supreme Court of India
- In office 1 May 1987 – 12 December 1991
- Nominated by: R. S. Pathak
- Appointed by: Zail Singh

24th Chief Justice of Bombay High Court
- In office 23 June 1986 – 30 April 1987
- Nominated by: P. N. Bhagwati
- Appointed by: Zail Singh
- Preceded by: Konda Madhava Reddy
- Succeeded by: Chittatosh Mookerjee

Judge of Bombay High Court
- In office 4 November 1969 – 22 June 1986
- Nominated by: Mohammad Hidayatullah
- Appointed by: V. V. Giri

Personal details
- Born: 18 November 1927
- Died: 1 February 2016 (aged 88)
- Spouse: Rupa Kania
- Relations: H. J. Kania (Uncle)
- Education: B.A.(Hons.), LL.B.
- Alma mater: Government Law College, Mumbai

Madhukar Hiralal Kania (18 November 1927 – 1 February 2016) was an Indian judge who served as the 23rd Chief Justice of India, serving from 13 December 1991 until his retirement on 17 November 1992. He was born in Bombay. His uncle, Sir Harilal Jekisundas Kania, was the first Chief Justice of India. As Chief Justice of India, he administered the oath of office to the 9th President of India Shankar Dayal Sharma.

== Biography ==
Kania was educated at Fellowship School, St. Xavier's High School, Elphinstone College and the Government Law College, Mumbai. He enrolled in an advocate on 1 November 1949 at Bombay High Court. He practiced mainly in civil suits and commercial matters in the High Court and the Bombay City Civil Court, Bombay. He also appeared for the state of Maharashtra in civil suits in the Bombay City Civil Court. He was Assistant Government Pleader for the State of Maharashtra in the Bombay City Civil Court from 5 December 1964 to 15 January 1967. He was government pleader for the State of Maharashtra in the Bombay City Civil Court from 16 January 1967 to 3 November 1969. He was appointed additional judge of the Bombay High Court from 14 November 1969 and as permanent Judge of that high court on 2 November 1971. In June 1986 he was appointed Chief Justice of the Bombay High Court. In May 1987, he was appointed a judge of the Supreme Court of India, and became the Chief Justice of India in December 1991.

Over the course of his Supreme Court tenure, Kania authored 107 judgments and sat on 454 benches.

== Links ==
- Biography, bombayhighcourt.nic.in. Accessed 16 April 2024.

Legal offices
Preceded by Kamal Narain Singh	Chief Justice of India; 13 December 1991– 17 November 1992	Succeeded by Lalit Mohan Sharma
