= Janak Singh =

Indian official and military officer in Jammu and Kashmir (1872–1970)

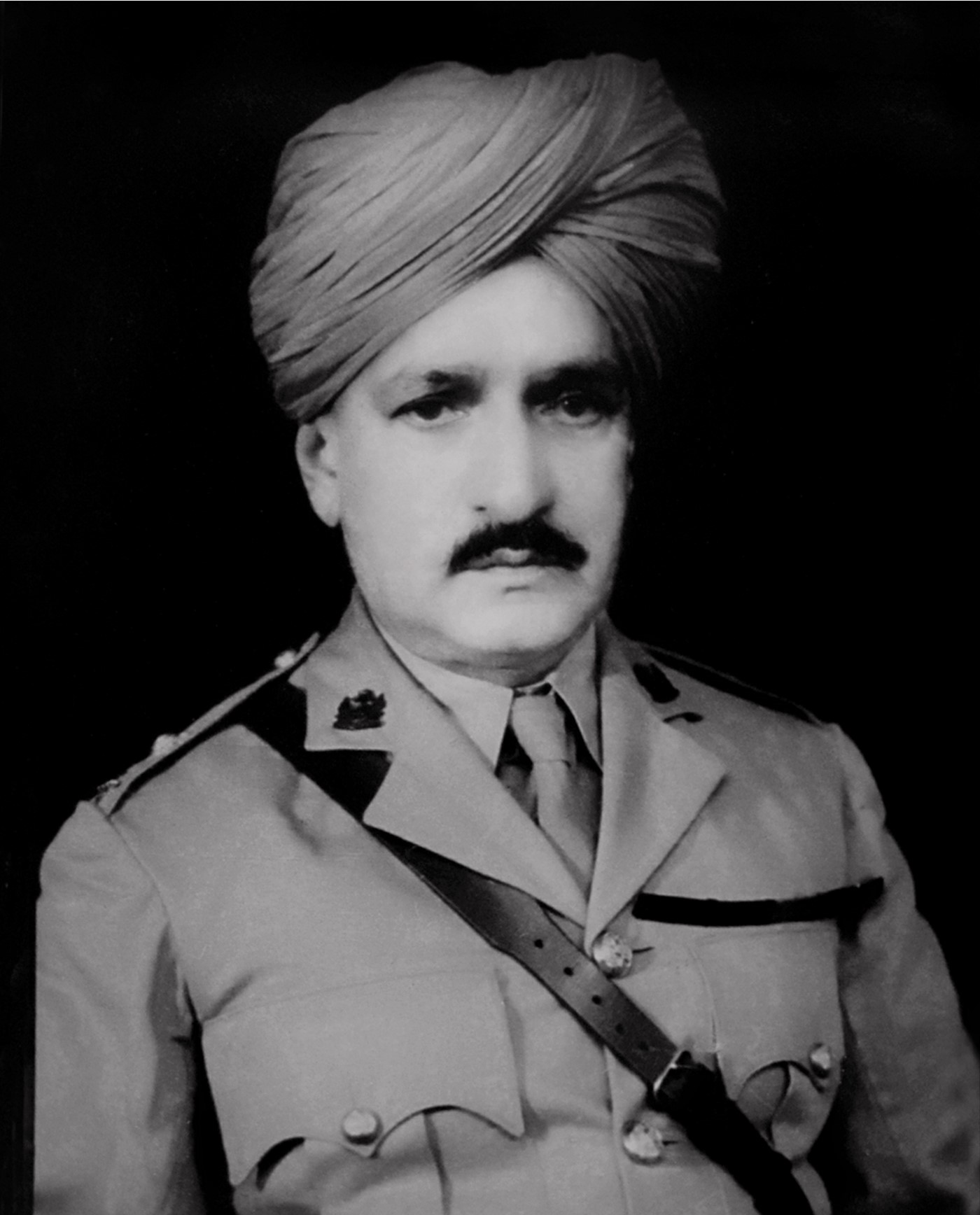
- Major General Janak Singh

Prime Minister of Jammu and Kashmir
- In office 11 August 1947 – 14 October 1947
- Preceded by: Ram Chandra Kak
- Succeeded by: Mehr Chand Mahajan

Personal details
- Born: 5 August 1872 Khaira, Kangra district, British India
- Died: 15 March 1970 (aged 97)
- Children: Kashmir Singh Katoch
- Awards: Military Cross

Military service
- Branch/service: Jammu and Kashmir State Forces; Indian Army
- Rank: Major General
- Battles/wars: World War II; Italian campaign; India–Pakistan war of 1947–1948

Major General Janak Singh (surname Katoch) CIE, OBI, (5 August 1872 – 15 March 1970) was an officer of the Jammu and Kashmir State Forces in the princely state of Jammu and Kashmir. After retirement, he briefly served as the prime minister of the state during a crucial period in 1947, which was evidently a temporary appointment while the Maharaja looked for a more permanent candidate.

== Early life ==
Janak Singh was born in the village of Khaira in Kangra district, in the present-day state of Himachal Pradesh in India in 1872 where he completed his primary education by 1884.

== Career ==
He began as a Naib-Tehsildar in Ramnagar on June 11, 1901, and was commissioned as a Major in the Department of Army Administration & Quartermaster General (DAA & QMG) at the Jammu and Kashmir Army Headquarters the following year. In 1905, he came into contact with Raja Amar Singh, influencing his subsequent postings. By 1912, he had served as the Wazir Wazarat in Kathua, Kishtwar, and Gilgit. From 1915 to 1917, he was appointed Military Secretary to the Commander-in-Chief, Raja Hari Singh, holding the rank of Lieutenant Colonel. From 1917 to 1920, Janak Singh commanded the 2nd Battalion of the 2nd Kashmir Rifles in Gilgit, followed by leadership of the 3rd Kashmir Rifles at Satwari Cantonment. Between 1921 and 1925, he served as Revenue and Foreign Minister. After 1925, he held multiple ministerial portfolios, including Army, Public Works, Law, and Revenue, reflecting his significant role in the administration of Jammu and Kashmir. In 1947, during a critical period leading up to the state’s accession to India, he briefly served as the Prime Minister.

=== Prime ministership ===
On 11 August 1947, Singh was brought out of retirement to be the prime minister at a turbulent time on the eve of the independence of India and Pakistan. Singh's predecessor, Ram Chandra Kak, was dismissed and placed under house arrest by the Maharaja. Singh's appointment was deemed to be a temporary one while the Maharaja searched for a more permanent replacement.

Singh steered the Standstill Agreement that Kashmir wanted to sign with both India and Pakistan. Pakistan consented immediately but India asked for further negotiations. In the meanwhile, Muslim League, the ruling party of Pakistan, used shortages of food and fuel, themselves partially caused by blockades placed by Pakistan, to incite rebellions in Poonch, Mirpur and Muzaffarabad. On 13 September 1947, Maharaja Hari Singh requested on loan the services of Lt. Col. Kashmir Singh Katoch (son of Janak Singh) to act as the military adviser to the Maharaja. This request was granted by the Indian government. (Note: Lt. Col. Kashmir Singh Katoch was the eldest of the three sons of Janak Singh.) Janak Singh was replaced by Mehr Chand Mahajan on 15 October 1947.

== Honours ==
Singh had won a Military Cross with a unit of the Frontier Force Rifles during World War II in action in Italy. On 16 April 1920, Singh, then a colonel in the State Forces, was awarded the Order of British India. He ultimately retired as a Lieutenant General in the Indian Army. His other two sons also served in the Indian Army, one in the 5 Gorkha Rifles, Brigadier Devendra Singh Katoch, AVSM, and the youngest, Lt. Colonel Rajendra Singh Katoch, followed his father into the J&K State forces, where he was commissioned into the J&K Bodyguard Cavalry.

== Bibliography ==
- Das Gupta, Jyoti Bhusan (1968). Jammu and Kashmir. Springer. ISBN 978-94-011-9231-6.
- Jha, Prem Shankar (1996). Kashmir, 1947: Rival Versions of History. Oxford University Press. ISBN 978-0-19-563766-3 – via archive.org.
- Singh, K. Brahma (2010) [first published Lancer International 1990]. History of Jammu and Kashmir Rifles, 1820-1956: The State Force Background (PDF). brahmasingh.co.nf. ISBN 978-81-7062-091-4. Archived from the original (PDF) on 6 March 2016.

Political offices
Preceded by Ram Chandra Kak	Prime Minister of Jammu and Kashmir; 1947 (August–October)	Succeeded by Mehr Chand Mahajan
