= Baron Spens =

Barony in the Peerage of the United Kingdom

Baron Spens, of Blairsanquhar in the County of Fife, is a title in the Peerage of the United Kingdom. It was created on 20 August 1959 for the lawyer and Conservative politician Sir Patrick Spens. As of 2017 the title is held by his great-grandson, the fourth Baron, who succeeded his father in 2001.

== Barons Spens (1959) ==
- (William) Patrick Spens, 1st Baron Spens (1885–1973)
- William George Michael Spens, 2nd Baron Spens (1914–1984)
- Patrick Michael Rex Spens, 3rd Baron Spens (1942–2001)
- Patrick Nathaniel George Spens, 4th Baron Spens (b. 1968)

The heir apparent is the present holder's son Hon. Peter Lathallan Spens (b. 2000)

=== Line of Succession ===
- William Patrick Spens, 1st Baron Spens (1885–1973)
  - William George Michael Spens, 2nd Baron Spens (1914–1984)
    - Patrick Michael Rex Spens, 3rd Baron Spens (1942–2001)
      - Patrick Nathaniel George Spens, 4th Baron Spens (born 1968)
        - (1) Hon. Peter Lathallan Spens (b. 2000)
      - (2) Hon. William Ronald Patrick Spens (b. 1983)
    - (3) Hon. William David Ralph Spens (b. 1943)
      - (4) James Michael William Spens (b. 1969)
