= Ram Chandra Kak =

Indian politician

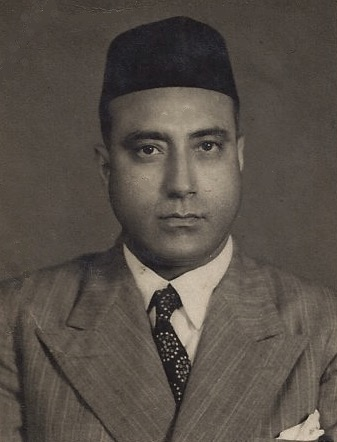

Prime Minister of Jammu and Kashmir
- In office June 1945 – 11 August 1947
- Monarch: Hari Singh
- Preceded by: Sir Benegal Narsing Rau
- Succeeded by: Janak Singh

Personal details
- Born: 5 June 1893 Srinagar, Jammu and Kashmir, British India
- Died: 10 February 1983 (aged 89)

Ram Chandra Kak (5 June 1893 – 10 February 1983) was the prime minister of Jammu and Kashmir during 1945–1947. One of the very few Kashmiri Pandits to ever hold that post, Kak had the intractable job of navigating the troubled waters of the transfer of power from British Raj to the independent dominions of India and Pakistan.

Kak was also a pioneering archaeologist who excavated the major sites of antiquities in Kashmir Valley and wrote a definitive treatise on them.

== Early life ==
Ram Chandra Kak was born to a prominent Kashmiri Pandit family in Srinagar. Ram Chandra Kak was the second among seven children (four sons and three daughters) of Keshav Lal Kak (b. 1873) —a money-lender and part time trader— and Bhageshwari Devi. He spent his early life in the Gurguri Mohalla of Srinagar. Kak graduated from Sri Pratap College in 1913 and enrolled for a M. A., before being selected for training in archaeology. From 1914 to 1919, Kak trained under John Marshall.

== Career ==
After training, Kak was appointed as the superintendent of the newly established Department of Archaeology, before being promoted to the Director. He also served as the curator of SPS Museum, and Librarian of Maharaja Hari Singh's private library.

Kak was appointed to the post of Chief Secretary in 1934, followed by Inspector General of Customs & Excise in 1935. In 1938, he was inducted as the "Political Advisor" to the Maharaja, and then as the Minister of Military Affairs in 1941. He held the role of "minister-in-waiting" for the Maharaja Hari Singh during 1942–1945.

=== Prime minister of Jammu and Kashmir ===
Kak was appointed the prime minister of Jammu and Kashmir from June 1945 until 11 August 1947, during the key transitional period when the British were preparing for departure from India.

==== 1946 ====
In 1946, as the National Conference (NC) began the Quit Kashmir movement against the Maharaja, Kak declared martial law and had all leaders arrested on 20 May. Sheikh Abdullah was soon sentenced to imprisonment for three years. Jawaharlal Nehru attempted to appear as his defence counsel but his entry to Srinagar was blocked by Kak on 21 July. (Note: Nehru was put to house-arrest at a dak bungalow in Domel, close to Muzaffarabad. He would return to Delhi after two days, following a summon from Gandhi.) Kak remained defiant despite multiple Congress leaders requesting him to have Abdullah released. (Note: The rival party Muslim Conference did not support Abdullah's agitation and had branded it as a ploy to garner reputation, that was allegedly lost due to his pro-India stance. However, they offered support to the cause of Abdullah's release and would launch their "direct action program", piggybacking on it among many other issues.)

Kak, in an unpublished memoir on the accession-disputes, claims to have been ill-disposed to these pleas because the Indian National Congress (INC) had lent its "great weight of authority" to Abdullah's misplaced agitation; INC is castigated for publishing "highly coloured, inaccurate and vituperative statements" and passing resolutions against Singh's government. (Note: However, Gandhi and Patel went on to convince Kak about allowing Nehru c. July — Nehru would eventually meet Abdullah in jail. They failed to make Kak agree about freeing Abdullah, though.) These unfavorable views about INC would guide his (and Maharaja's) decision to not accede to India —rather than any fundamental objection to the accession itself—, next month. In late July, Kak met with Sardar Vallabhbhai Patel —who was to become the home minister of the Interim Government of India— but discussions did not get very far. Patel advised that Sheikh Abdullah be released from prison and steps taken to improve relations between the ruler and the people much to the displeasure of Kak, who rejected Patel's authority and jurisdiction. (Note: Kak asserted that the authority of the British Government, to advise the Maharaja, could not be inherited by the Interim Government.) Patel took offence at what he called the "cold, official touch-me-not attitude" and rejected supporting any plan involving complete independence for Kashmir.

Kak's initiative having ended in failure, the British Resident in Kashmir reported in November that Kashmir was likely to stay out of the Indian Union — the cited reason was "antagonism [...] displayed by a Congress Central Government".

==== 1947 ====
After the Partition of India was decided in June 1947, a decision on accession became imminent. Lord Mountbatten visited Kashmir in June (19–23 June) and coaxed Kak as well as Singh into choosing a side while guaranteeing the continuance of constitutional monarchy; on being asked by Kak about the "right choice", he hinted in favor of Pakistan. However, accession to Pakistan did not appeal to Kak and he concluded that "since Kashmir would not accede to Pakistan, it could not accede to India". (Note: Kak did not trust the Hindu monarchy and his Pandit brethren to be well-treated in Pakistan. But, he was also aware about the perils of acceding a state to India that shared extensive land-borders with Pakistan and had over 70% of the population as Muslims. Additional factors included INC's opposition to princely elites and a potential loss of socioeconomic privilege in an egalitarian India.) Kak advised the Maharaja of Kashmir to remain independent for at least a year, before deciding on the issue of accession.

In July, Kak met the leaders of INC and Muslim League at New Delhi. Jinnah, coordinating the accession of princely states to Pakistan, promised lucrative terms on an immediate deal but Kak stood by his earlier position. Jinnah did not mind as long as Kashmir did not accede to India. Kak also met V. P. Menon, the secretary in charge of princely states for India, and would later claim to have had him convinced about Kashmir's reasons for not acceding on an immediate basis; India was also apparently requested to help with the state's 'security arrangements'. (Note: Menon's visit to Kashmir was scheduled after 15 August - this would never materialize, as Kak was removed from service.) In contrast, Menon would hold Kak's replies to be evasive and note that "he could neither understand the man [Kak] nor fathom his game". General Henry Scott, the Chief of Staff of State Forces, in his last report opined that Kak favored independence but closer ties with Pakistan. (Note: He also credited Kak for maintaining friendly relations with both of the would-be dominions.)

On 1 August 1947, Gandhi visited Kashmir and pointed out to Kak how unpopular he was among the people. In response, Kak offered to resign. (Note: Gandhi reported back to Nehru that Bakshi Ghulam Mohammad had assured him of potential referendums turning in favor of India but iff Abdullah was released and Kak replaced.) However, the Maharaja —who was increasingly against joining Pakistan due to a variety of reasons (Note: Jha believes the primary cause to be riots manufactured by Muslim League in NFWP. About 2500 refugees (prim. Hindus and Sikhs) made to the Muzaffarabad province from Hazara in December 1946. Compounding factors were the rapid remodeling of Muslim Conference on Muslim League and introduction of communal discourse.) and trying to repair relationships with INC— is believed to have already decided, a few weeks earlier, to dismiss Kak for being an impediment to the process, and declare general amnesty to political prisoners.

==== Dismissal ====
Kak was dismissed as Prime Minister on 11 August 1947 and put under house arrest; he was replaced with a retired army officer Janak Singh. According to Kak, all senior officials such as the Chief Secretary, the Chief of the Army Staff, the Inspector General of Police were also replaced by less experienced people from the Maharaja's own community, which Kak described as a "decapitation" of the State administration. According to Henry Lawrence Scott, the Maharaja acted under influence of the Deputy Prime Minister M L. Batra, a Hindu swami, and the Maharani's brother Nachint Chand, all of whom wanted Kashmir to join India at the earliest.

Kak would return to the Maharaja's service a few weeks later, though not as the prime minister. On 14 September, the Maharaja informed Kak about forming a committee to enquire into his actions as the erstwhile Prime-Minister of the state; Kak declined to participate. On 16 September, Kak attempted to leave the state along with his family, having arranged a flight with help from Scott. But his departure was blocked by the Maharaja, and he was put under house arrest. However, with Scott's support, his family was allowed to leave on 22 September. (Note: A report in The Tribune, published on 8 October, would report Kak to have had enabled Muslim League in confining the pro-India National Conference into pockets while establishing its own "operational bases" in strategic locations of the state. "Crusaders" infiltrated from Punjab and the North-West Frontier Province into the valley as tourists and went about torturing non-Muslim subjects. Only with the removal of Kak, had the situations eased with Jinnah caps not visible everywhere, as before. The British Resident in Kashmir also confirmed similar information.)

==== Trial ====
After the tribal invasion in October, the Maharaja signed accession to the Dominion of India and moved to Jammu. Sheikh Adbdullah was appointed as the Head of Emergency Administration in Srinagar. Kak's detention was continued and he was moved to the Badami Bagh. Kak's wife, Margaret Kak, lobbied with the Mountbattens arguing for Kak's release and even Stafford Cripps in London raised it with Jawaharlal Nehru. Sheikh Abdullah's administration maintained that they had evidence that Kak was hobnobbing with the Pakistani raiders and agents. In his autobiography, Sheikh Abdullah held that Kak believed Kashmir, being a Muslim majority state, was bound to accede to Pakistan and prepared to be in its service; nonetheless, he praised Kak for maintaining good relations with the ruling circles in Pakistan.

Kak was tied to hay-ropes and paraded through the streets. Kashmiris aligned to the National Conference heckled him. In April 1948, he was tried for three criminal offences — he was acquitted on two counts but convicted of the third, and jailed. He was pardoned (and released), arguably under pressure from Delhi, but on the condition that he may never enter Kashmir without the permission of the state. Kak retired from public life, and migrated to Kasauli.

In 1959, the Chief Justice of Jammu and Kashmir High Court —Syed Murtaza Fazl Ali— voided the externment order upon an appeal from Kak but rejected his petition to be paid due pension. The court held that the Government had exercised reasonable discretion in withholding pensions from someone convicted of an offence involving moral turpitude. Kak returned back to Kashmir, but alternated between Srinagar and Kasauli.

== Personal life ==
Ram Chandra Kak married Janaki Devi (b. 1894) in 1901. They had five sons —Shailendra, Narendra, Brijendra, Surendra, and Khemendra— and a daughter, who died in infancy. They had also adopted Kak's grand-niece Lila. Devi died in 1928, from tuberculosis.

In 1935, Kak married Margaret Mary. Khemendra, a pilot for the Royal Indian Air Force, died in 1945 of a air-crash near Risalpur; this affected Kak considerably.

== Academics ==
Ram Chandra Kak was in possession of the two complete Sharada script copies of the Nilamata Purana, when a critical edition was being prepared by K. de Vreese.

Kak wrote a treatise on Kashmiri archaeology titled Ancient monuments of Kashmir in 1933; Francis Younghusband wrote the foreword to the book. The book focused on the destruction of temples by Muslim rulers to such an extent, that he was compelled by the publisher to expunge certain "irrelevant" passages lest communal harmony was affected; (Note: One of the deleted passages depicted Sikandar Shah Miri as a blood-thirsty Muslim whose ‘perpetual cry’ was to ‘slay, burn, destroy’ Hindus, and Hindu shrines. He was compared to Charles IX, responsible for the St. Bartholomew's Day massacre.) a chapter on political history of Kashmir portrayed the centuries of Islamic rule as "one of unmitigated plunder, barbarism, and iconoclasm." Historian Mridu Rai notes his work to fit into the usual scheme of the State Archaeological Department in privileging Hindus over the Muslims by various direct and indirect means; Ananya Jahanara Kabir reiterates such observations. (Note: The book had three photographs of Kashmir scenery, six of Islamicate sites, and sixty two of pre-Islamic heritage.)

== Books ==
- Handbook of the archaeological and numismatic sections of the Sri Pratap Singh Museum, Srinagar. Government Press. 1923.
- Ancient Monuments of Kashmir, With a Foreword By Sir Francis Younghusband, and an Introduction By A. Foucher. India Society. 1933.
- Memoirs of the Archaeological Survey of Kashmir. Publ. under the authority of the Kashmir Durbar. Archaeological Survey of Kashmir, [Repr.] Sagar Publ. 1971.

== Bibliography ==
- Ankit, Rakesh (April 2010), "Pandit Ramchandra Kak: The Forgotten Premier of Kashmir", Epilogue, 4 (4), Epilogue -Jammu Kashmir: 36–39
- Bhattacharjea, Ajit (2008), Sheikh Mohammad Abdullah: Tragic Hero of Kashmir, Roli Books
- Jha, Prem Shankar (2003), The Origins of a Dispute: Kashmir 1947, Oxford University Press, ISBN 978-0-19-566486-7
  - Jha, Prem Shankar (1996), Kashmir, 1947: Rival Versions of History, Oxford University Press, ISBN 978-0-19-563766-3 – via archive.org
- Tanwar, Raghuvendra (2019), 'Be Clear Kashmir will Vote for India' Jammu & Kashmir 1947–1953: Reporting the Contemporary Understanding of the Unreported, Taylor & Francis, ISBN 978-1-00-051753-8

Political offices
Preceded by Sir Benegal Narsing Rau	Prime Minister of Jammu and Kashmir; 1945–1947	Succeeded by Janak Singh
