= Federal Court of India =

Former court in British India (1937–1950)

The Federal Court of India was a judicial body, established in India in 1937 under the provisions of the Government of India Act 1935, with original, appellate and advisory jurisdiction. It functioned until the Supreme Court of India was established in 1950. Although the seat of the Federal Court was at Delhi, however, a separate Federal Court of Pakistan was established in Pakistan at Karachi after the Partition of India. There was a right of appeal to the Judicial Committee of the Privy Council in London from the Federal Court of India.

The Federal Court had exclusive original jurisdiction in any dispute between the Central Government and the Provinces. Initially, it was empowered to hear appeals from the High Courts of the provinces in the cases which involved the interpretation of any Section of the Government of India Act, 1935. From 5 January 1948 it was also empowered to hear appeals in those cases, which did not involve any interpretation of the Government of India Act, 1935.

== History ==
The Federal Court came into being on 1 October 1937. The seat of the court was the Chamber of Princes in the Parliament building in Delhi. It began with a Chief Justice and two puisne judges. The first Chief Justice was Sir Maurice Gwyer and the other two judges were Sir Shah Muhammad Sulaiman and M. R. Jayakar. It functioned until the establishment of the Supreme Court of India on 28 January 1950, two days after India was declared a republic.

Number	Name	Period of office		Length of term (days)	Bar	Appointed by
1	Sir Maurice Gwyer	1 October 1937	25 April 1943^{‡}	2,032	Inner Temple	The Marquess of Linlithgow
Acting	Sir Srinivas Varadachariar	25 April 1943	7 June 1943	43		The Marquess of Linlithgow
2	Sir Patrick Spens	7 June 1943	14 August 1947	1,529	Inner Temple	The Marquess of Linlithgow
3	Sir H. J. Kania	14 August 1947^{#}	26 January 1950	896	Bombay High Court	The Viscount Mountbatten of Burma

- ^{‡} – Date of resignation
- ^{#} – On 14 August 1947 Federal Court partitioned into the federal courts of India and Pakistan

== See also ==
- History of the Indian Subcontinent
  - History of the Republic of India
    - Supreme Court of India
    - Chief Justice of India
    - Judges of the Supreme Court of India
    - National Judicial Appointments Commission
    - Judicial activism in India
  - History of the Islamic Republic of Pakistan
    - Supreme Court of Pakistan (Judicial history)
    - Chief Justice of Pakistan
    - Justices of the Supreme Court of Pakistan
    - Supreme Court Bar Association
    - Judicial activism (Lawyers' movement)
