= Patrick Spens, 1st Baron Spens =

British lawyer, judge and Conservative politician

The Right Honourable The Lord Spens KBE PC QC
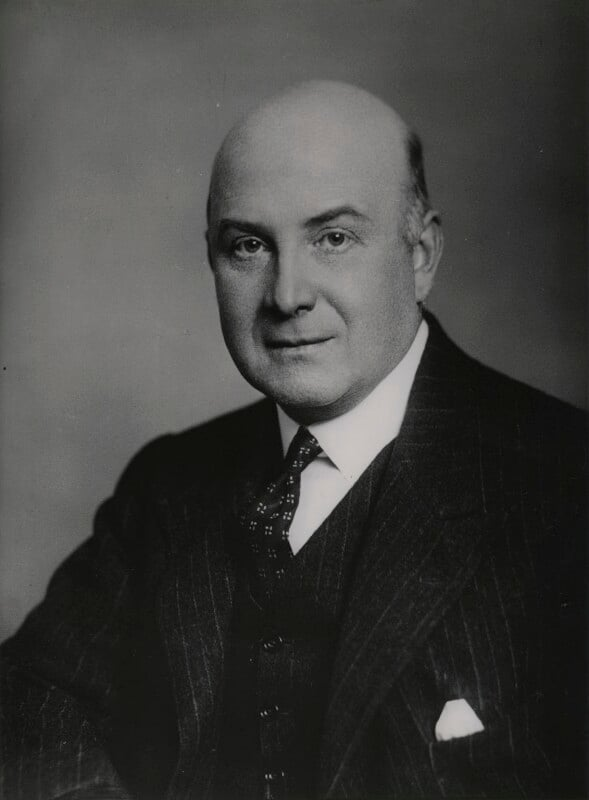
- Spens in 1950

Chief Justice of India
- In office 1943–1947
- Monarch: George VI
- Preceded by: Srinivas Varadachariar (acting)
- Succeeded by: H. J. Kania

Member of Parliament for Kensington South
- In office 23 February 1950 – 18 September 1959
- Preceded by: Richard Law
- Succeeded by: William Roots

Member of Parliament for Ashford
- In office 17 March 1933 – 1943
- Preceded by: Michael Knatchbull
- Succeeded by: Edward Percy Smith

Personal details
- Born: William Patrick Spens; 9 August 1885 Glasgow, Lanarkshire, Scotland
- Died: 15 November 1973 (aged 88) Maidstone, Kent, England
- Party: Conservative
- Spouses: Hilda Mary Bowyer (m. 1913; died 1962) Kathleen Annie Fedden Dodds (m. 1963)
- Education: New College, Oxford

William Patrick Spens, 1st Baron Spens, KBE, PC, QC (9 August 1885 – 15 November 1973) was a British lawyer, judge and Conservative politician. He served as Chief Justice of India from 1943 to 1947.

== Biography ==
Spens was the eldest of the six children of Nathaniel Spens, a chartered accountant and managing director of state liquidation, born in Glasgow and of Frimley, Surrey, and Emily Jessie Connal. His parents were of Scottish descent. Spens was educated at Rugby and New College, Oxford, and was called to the Bar by the Inner Temple in 1910. He served in the First World War as an adjutant in the 5th battalion of the Queen's Royal Regiment. After the war Spens started practising as a lawyer and became a King's Counsel (KC) in 1925. He unsuccessfully contested St Pancras South West in the 1929 general election, but was elected for Ashford in 1933. In 1943 Spens was unexpectedly appointed Chief Justice of India. He retained this post until 1947.

He served from 1947 to 1948 as chairman of the tribunal set up to arbitrate between Indian judges disagreeing over the concept and substance of the Partition of India which had been announced by Lord Mountbatten and was being detailed by Sir Cyril Radcliffe's two boundary commissions (one for Bengal, one for present-day Pakistan).

Spens returned to Britain in 1949, and the following year he was elected as Member of Parliament (MP) for Kensington South. He stood down from Parliament in its recall for the 1959 general election.

Spens was knighted in 1943, appointed a KBE in 1948 and admitted to the Privy Council in 1953. After his retirement from the House of Commons in 1959 he was raised to the peerage as Baron Spens, of Blairsanquhar in the County of Fife.

Spens married firstly Hilda Mary, daughter of Wentworth Grenville Bowyer, in 1913. They had two sons, and a daughter. Patricia Mary Spens was born in 1919, and joined the Special Operations Executive (SOE) in 1942.

After his first wife's death in 1962 he married secondly Kathleen Annie Fedden, daughter of Roger Dodds. Lord Spens died in November 1973, aged 88. He was succeeded in the barony by his eldest and only surviving son, William.

== Notes ==
Parliament of the United Kingdom
Preceded by Michael Knatchbull	Member of Parliament for Ashford; 1933–1943	Succeeded by Edward Percy Smith
Preceded by Richard Kidston Law	Member of Parliament for Kensington South; 1950–1959	Succeeded by William Lloyd Roots
Peerage of the United Kingdom
New creation	Baron Spens; 1959–1973	Succeeded by William Spens
