= Srinivas Varadachariar =

Indian judge (1881–1970)

Sir Srinivas Varadachariar

Chief Justice of the Federal Court of India
- Acting; 25 April 1943 – 7 June 1943
- Governor-General: The Marquess of Linlithgow
- Preceded by: Sir Maurice Gwyer
- Succeeded by: Sir Patrick Spens

Personal details
- Born: 20 June 1881
- Died: 6 September 1970 (aged 89)

Sir Srinivas Varadachariar (20 June 1881 – 6 September 1970) was an Indian jurist who was the first Indian chief justice of the Federal Court of India when he served as the acting chief justice of the court between 25 April 1943 and 7 June 1943. He was also a judge of the Madras High Court and of the Federal Court of India. Varadachariar headed the ad-hoc committee of the Constituent Assembly of India, which drafted the provisions to set up the Supreme Court of India.

== Biography ==
Varadachariar was born on 20 June 1881 into a family of Iyengar priests, with limited financial means. His father was the priest to the house of lawyer and jurist Sir V. Bhashyam Aiyangar, the first Indian Advocate-General of Madras. Varadachariar started as an apprentice under Aiyangar and later under P. S. Sivaswami Iyer. He was admitted into the bar in 1905 and rose to become the judge of the Madras High Court in 1934.

Varadachariar was knighted and appointed as a judge of the Federal Court of India, the forerunner to the Supreme Court of India, in 1939. He was appointed by the then Governor-General of India, Victor Hope. Varadachariar succeeded M. R. Jayakar who stepped down as a judge when he was appointed to the Judicial Committee of the Privy Council. At the time, the Federal Court of India had three judges, a British judge, and two Indian judges with one Hindu and one Muslim judge. Varadachariar served as the acting chief justice of the Federal Court of India between 25 April 1943 and 7 June 1943, when the first chief justice of the court Sir Maurice Linford Gwyer stepped down. In serving as the acting chief justice, he was the first Indian chief justice of the Federal Court of India. Amongst the significant cases presided by Varadachariar as the Chief Justice included King Emperor v Beonarilal Sharma, a case that is noted to have cost him his position as the permanent chief justice of the court. Despite being the senior most judge in the court, he was succeeded by British judge William Patrick Spens. As a judge, Varadachariar retired from the Federal Court of India in 1946 after serving for seven years.

Varadachariar was also the chairman of the Government of India's First Central Pay Commission in 1946. The commission's recommendations were accepted by the government in May 1947. He was also the chairman of the Income Tax Investigation Commission set up under the Taxation of Income Act. Varadachariar headed the ad-hoc committee of the Constituent Assembly of India, which drafted the provisions to set up the Supreme Court of India.

He later served as the president of the board of the Lady Sivaswami Iyer Girls' School in Madras. In addition to legal learnings, Varadachariar was a scholar of Sanskrit.

== Published works ==
- Varadachariar, S. (1946). The Hindu Judicial System. Lucknow University.
