= Hari Singh =

Maharaja of Jammu and Kashmir from 1925 to 1952

Hari Singh Bahadur
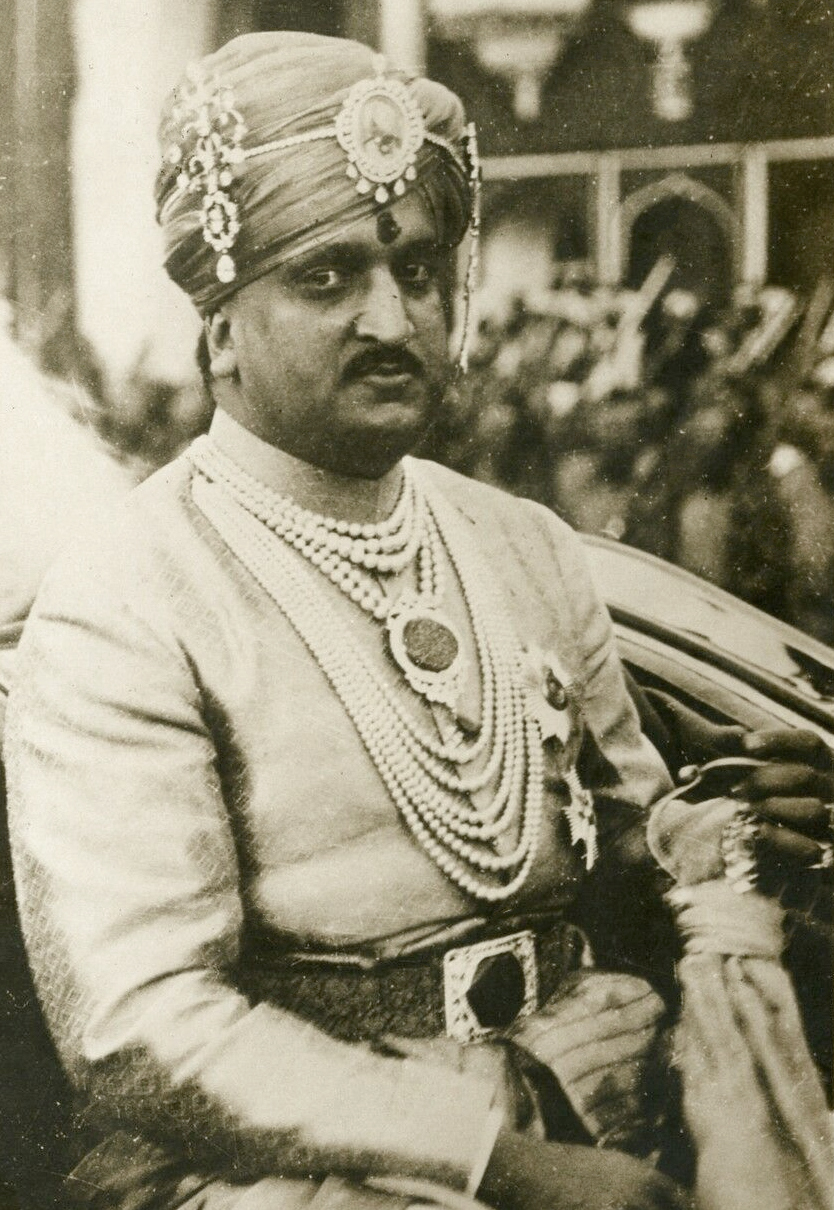
- Singh in 1931

Maharaja of Jammu and Kashmir
- Reign: 23 September 1925 – 17 November 1952
- Coronation: 29 March 1926
- Predecessor: Pratap Singh
- Successor: Monarchy abolished
- Regent: Karan Singh (1949–1952)
- Born: September 1895; Jammu, Jammu and Kashmir, British India (present-day Jammu and Kashmir, India)
- Died: 26 April 1961 (aged 65); Bombay, Maharashtra, India (present-day Mumbai)
- Spouses: Sri Lal Kunverba Sahiba (m. 1913; died 1915) Princess Dhan Dei of Chamba (m. 1915; died 1920) Dhanvant Kunveri Baiji (m. 1923, died) Princess Tara Devi Katoch (m. 1928; sep. 1950)
- Issue: Karan Singh
- House: Dogra
- Father: Amar Singh
- Mother: Bhotiali Chib
- Religion: Hinduism

Sir Hari Singh Bahadur GCSI GCIE GCVO (September 1895 – 26 April 1961) was the last ruling Maharaja of the princely state of Jammu and Kashmir of the Dogra dynasty.

Hari Singh was the son of Amar Singh and Bhotiali Chib. In 1923, following his uncle's death, Singh became the new Maharaja of Jammu and Kashmir. After Indian Independence in 1947, Singh wanted Jammu and Kashmir to remain as an independent kingdom. He acceded to the Dominion of India to get the support of Indian troops against an invasion by tribal armed men and the Pakistan Army into his state. Singh remained the titular Maharaja of the state until 1952, when the monarchy was abolished by the Indian government. After spending his final days in Bombay, he died on 26 April 1961.

Singh was a controversial ruler. He faced an agitation in Kashmir in 1931 and successful rebellions in Poonch and Gilgit-Baltistan in 1947. He was complicit in the 1947 Jammu massacres.

== Early life ==
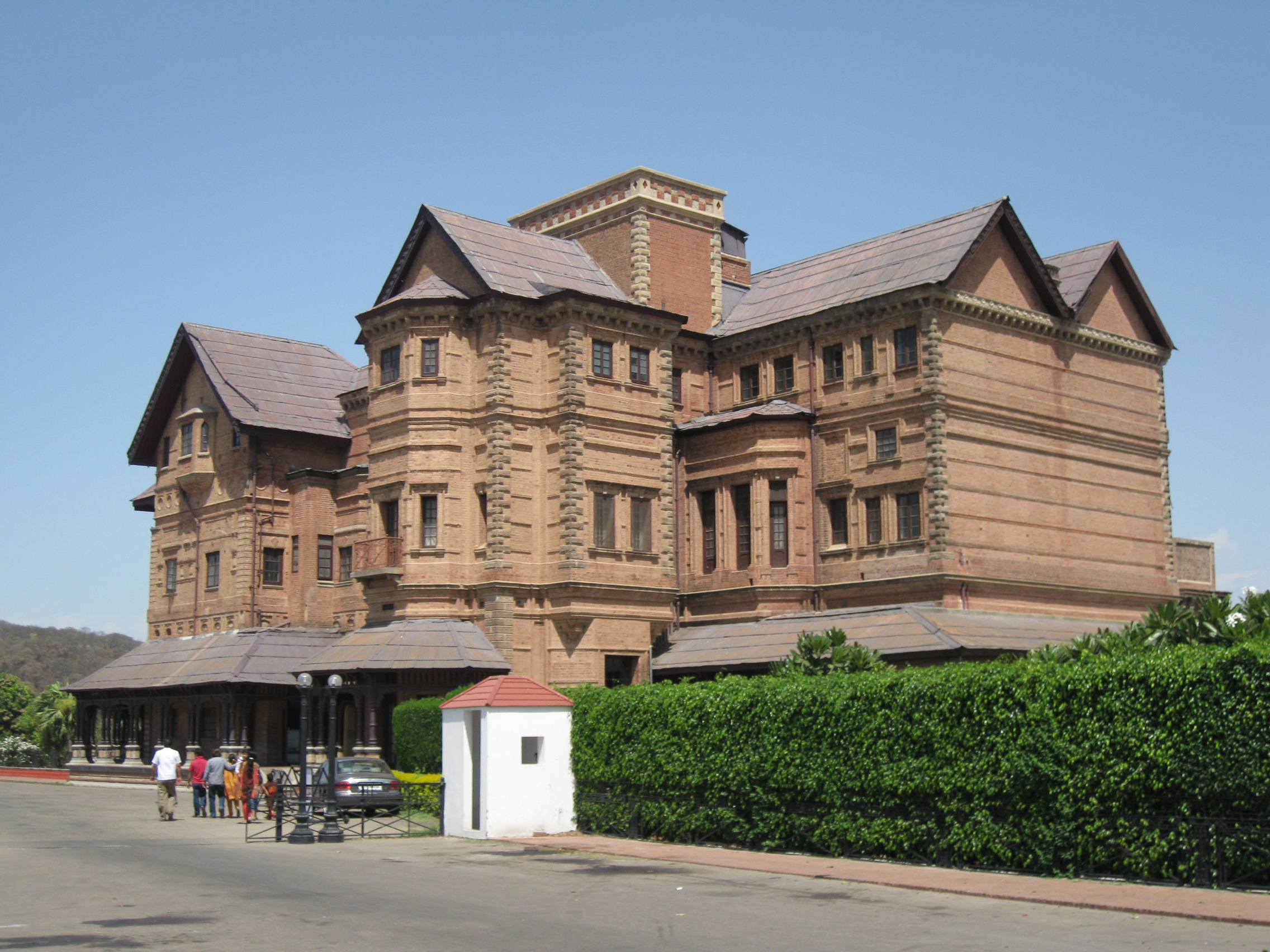
Amar Mahal Palace, birthplace of Hari Singh

Hari Singh was born in the Dogra Rajput royal family in September 1895 at the Amar Mahal, Palace, Jammu. He was the only surviving son of Raja Amar Singh, the brother of Maharaja Pratap Singh, then the Maharaja of Jammu and Kashmir. Since the Maharaja had no issue, Hari Singh was heir presumptive to the throne of Jammu and Kashmir.

In 1903, Hari Singh served as a page of honour to Lord Curzon at the grand Delhi Durbar. At the age of 13, he was sent to Mayo College in Ajmer. A year later, in 1909, his father died and the British took a keen interest in his education, appointing Major H. K. Barr as his guardian. After Mayo College, Hari Singh went to the British-run Imperial Cadet Corps at Dehradun for military training.

He was appointed the commander-in-chief of the State Forces in 1915 by Maharaja Pratap Singh. In the 1918 New Year's Honours list, he was appointed a Knight Commander of the Order of the British Empire (KBE).

=== Beyond Borders: A Year in Europe ===
Hari Singh made history by boarding the SS Loyalty, owned by Scindia Steam Navigation Company Ltd., which departed from Bombay on 5 April 1919—the first international voyage by an Indian-flagged merchant ship to the United Kingdom. This milestone is commemorated annually in India as National Maritime Day since 1964. Hari Singh disembarked at Marseille and took a train to Paris, where he stayed for a few days before arriving in the U.K. on 29 May 1919. He was first received by King George V at Sandringham House, a monarch he had initially met during the Delhi Durbar Coronation, initially he stayed at the Hyde Park Hotel in Knightsbridge. In August, at the Dublin Horse Show, he spent £950,000 purchasing racehorses and ponies, hired well trained staff from County Kildare to tend to them—all of which were later sent to Kashmir. In September, he took up residence at Douglas Castle in Lanarkshire, Scotland, where he hosted refined hunting gatherings and tested his newly acquired automobiles for speed and endurance. Among the three high-powered cars he had earlier procured in London was a 60 kW all-electric Rolls-Royce Silver Ghost, a symbol of both innovation and prestige before eventually settling at 27 Curzon Street in Mayfair for the winter. On 12 December 1919, Hari Singh was received by the then Prince of Wales (later King Edward VIII) at St James's Palace during his study tour, which focused on understanding the functioning of government, particularly in the areas of transport, industry, education and sanitation. He later returned to India from Marseille on 28 March 1920, eventually reaching Kashmir in May 1920.

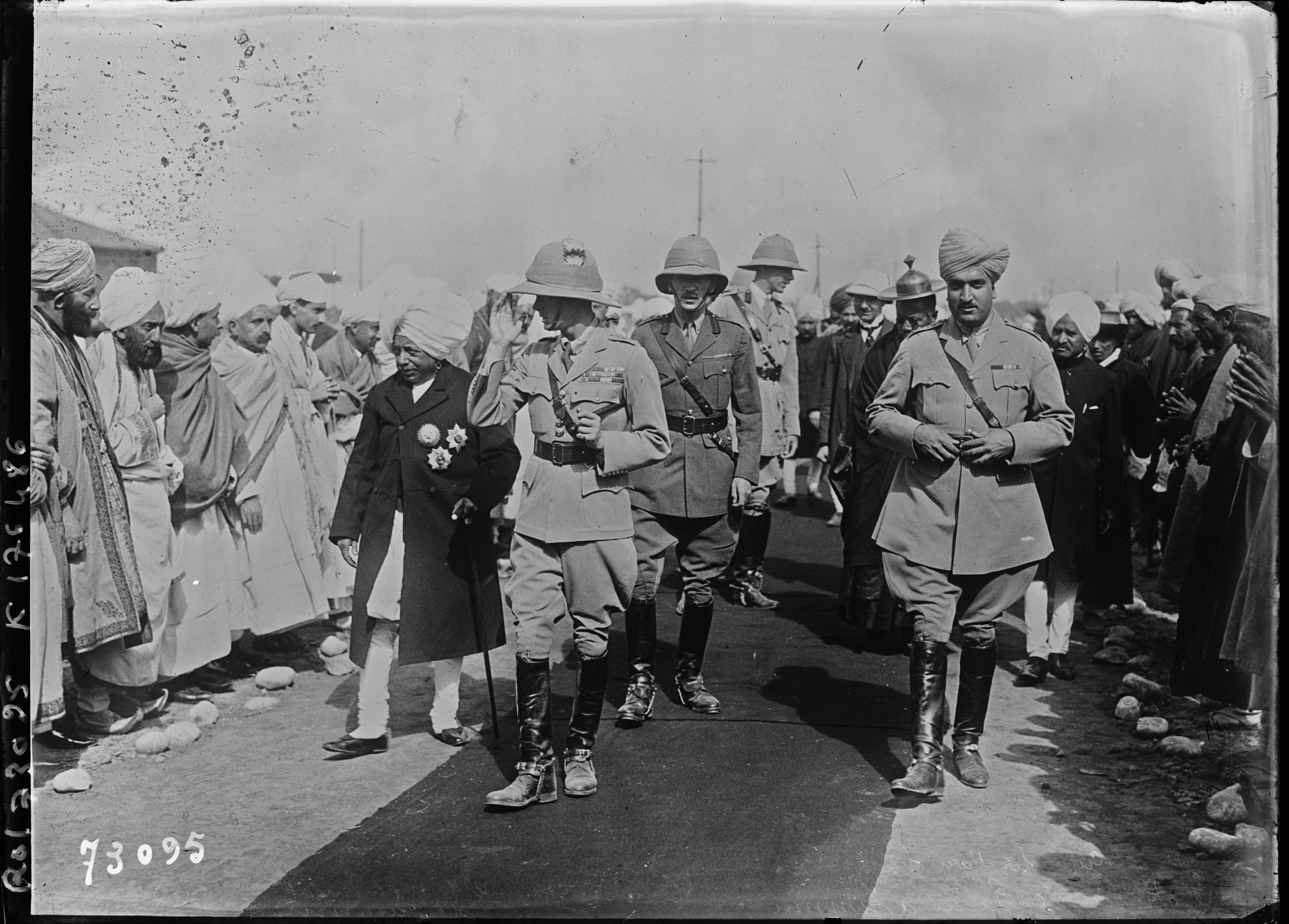
Walking in front (L to R) Maharaja Pratap Singh , Edward VIII and Hari Singh at Jammu

In March 1922, the Prince of Wales undertook a reciprocal visit to Kashmir, arriving by train in Jammu on the 2nd. He was received at the railway station by Maharaja Pratap Singh and Raja Hari Singh, and was then escorted to the Maharaja's cantonment camp at Satwari, as Jammu city was in the grip of a plague outbreak. After traveling through the region, he concluded his journey through the princely state and reached Peshawar by the 6th of March.

== Reign ==
A film of the coronation of Maharaja Hari Singh at Mubark Mandi palace in Jammu in 1926. In this film by Eastman Kodak it states, he is "wearing jewels valued at twenty million dollars" (approximately $363,700,000 in today's value).

Following the death of his uncle Pratap Singh on 23 September 1925, Hari Singh served as the second Prime Minister (1925–1926) of Jammu and Kashmir. Hari Singh ascended the throne of Jammu and Kashmir in February 1926 under British intervention, who overruled Pratap Singh's choice of an adopted son, Raja Jagat Dev Singh of Poonch.

Hari Singh's coronation from 22 to 28 February 1926 was divided into two separate ceremonies - the first few days for the religious ceremonies and official programme in the latter part was set aside for hosting the European attendees.

After becoming the ruler, Hari Singh conducted free elections and formed the Praja Sabha Jammu and Kashmir Legislative Assembly to rule with laws implemented under Ranbir Penal Code (R.P.C) which Praja Sabha decreed. In April 1932, as per recommendations of the Glancy Commission, the Praja Sabha was established, made up of 75 members – 12 government officials, 16 state councillors, 14 nominated, and 33 elected (21 Muslims, 10 Hindus and 2 Sikhs). By September 1934 the elected members started making laws under the Praja Sabha which made Jammu and Kashmir a forerunner state for other Princely Indian States. On 7 September 1939 Maharaja Hari Singh and his law and Revenue Minister, Justice Sir Lal Gopal Mukherjee, a former judge of the Allahabad high court (1926–1934) who had served the state of Jammu and Kashmir from 1935 to 1940, produced a written constitution for Jammu and Kashmir which was the "pioneer" in the annals of Asia's constitutional history; despite the fact that it was anything but a people-friendly "Magna Carta" for the state. He made primary education compulsory in the state, introduced laws prohibiting child marriage, and opened places of worship to low caste subjects.

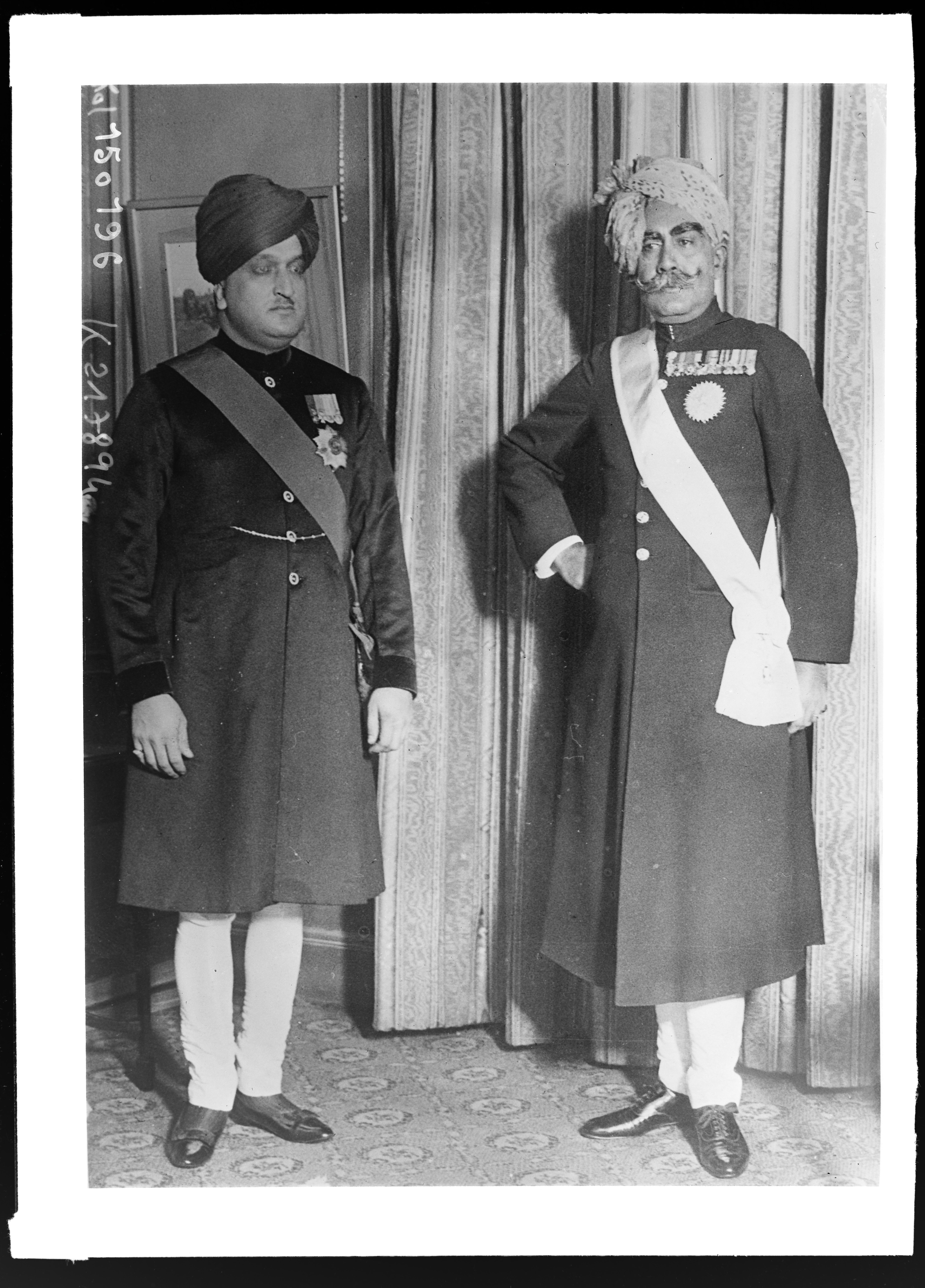
(L to R) Maharaja Hari Singh and Maharaja Ganga Singh (Bikaner) representing Princes from India in First Round Table Conference in November 1930

In 1930, Hari Singh attended the First Round Table Conference in London. He suggested that the Indian Princely states should join an "All India Federation" and pleaded for equal status for Indians in the British Commonwealth of Nations. While replying to the inaugural address by King-Emperor George V, Hari Singh said:

I must express our deep gratitude to His Most Gracious Majesty for the cordial welcome tendered to us and I pray that providence may grant us the vision and the will to realize the hopes expressed in the inspiring words uttered this morning by our beloved Emperor. This is the first occasion on which the Princes of India meet in person at a Conference Table along with the representatives of British India and His Majesty's Government to discuss the political future of India. ... I feel deeply gratified at the progress which has been made with the scheme of an All-India Federation as worked out in the Report of the Federal Structure Sub-Committee. But ever since the idea of a Federation was taken up in this Conference, some surprise has been expressed in various quarters in India and in England at the willingness of the Princes to join an All-India Federation. It is said that Princes have forced the pace and that in any case they should have opposed a Federation with British India. I have never disguised from my friends, my warm support of the idea of an All-India Federation.

=== Partition and accession ===
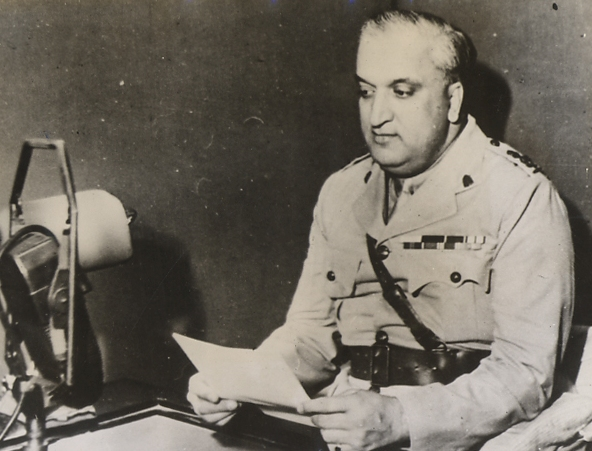
Hari Singh in 1943

In 1947, after India gained independence from British rule, Jammu and Kashmir had the option of joining one of the new dominions, India and Pakistan, or remaining independent. Hari Singh opted to remain independent for the immediate future since the dominions were beset with partition violence and he needed time to weigh the options in the context of his Muslim-majority population. He signed a standstill agreement with Pakistan on 14 August 1947 and urged India to do the same, but India did not comply. On 6 October 1947, he faced an armed uprising in Poonch instigated by the Muslim Conference party, followed by Pakistan-backed Pashtun tribal invasion at Muzaffarabad on 22 October 1947.

After attack Hari Singh appealed to India for help following the invasion. India's British Governor-General, Lord Mountbatten, advised the Maharaja to accede to India before India could send its troops. The Maharaja signed the Instrument of Accession on 26 October 1947, joining the princely state to the Dominion of India. India sent troops to repel the invaders, which soon evolved into the first Indo-Pakistan War.

Pressure from Prime Minister Jawaharlal Nehru and Deputy Prime Minister Vallabhbhai Patel eventually compelled Singh to appoint his son and heir, Yuvraj (Crown Prince) Karan Singh, as Prince Regent of Jammu and Kashmir in 1949, although he remained the titular Maharaja of the state until 1952 when the monarchy was abolished by Nehru's government. He was also forced to appoint the popular Kashmiri leader Sheikh Abdullah as the prime minister of Kashmir. He had a contentious relationship with both Nehru and Abdullah. Karan Singh was appointed 'Sadr-e-Riyasat' ('Head of State') in 1952 and Governor of the State in 1964.

== During World War II ==
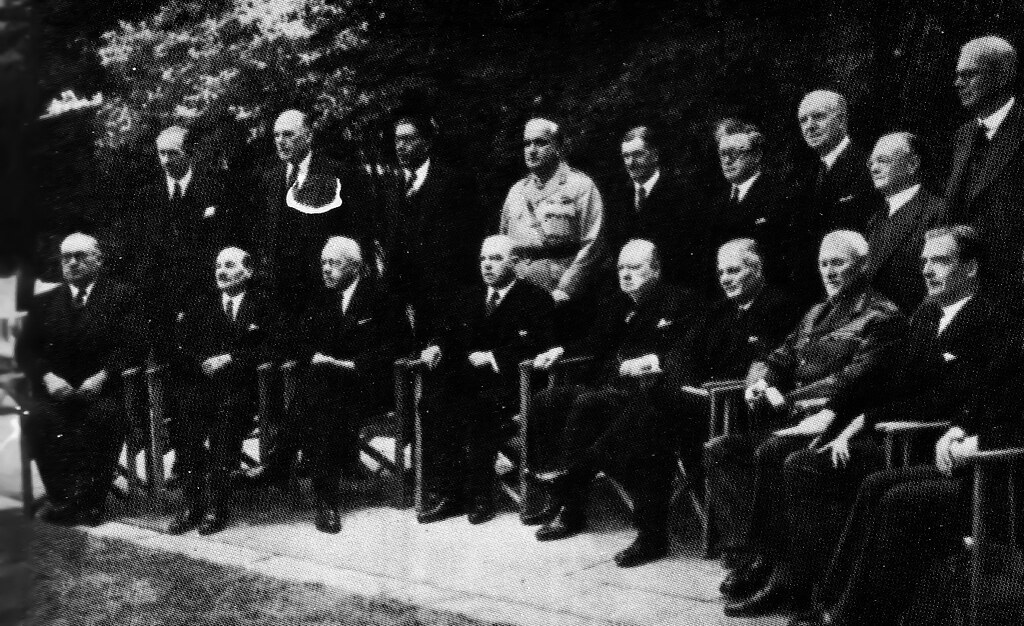
During WWII Maharaja Hari Singh (standing fourth from left) alongside Feroz Khan Noon represented India in British War Cabinet

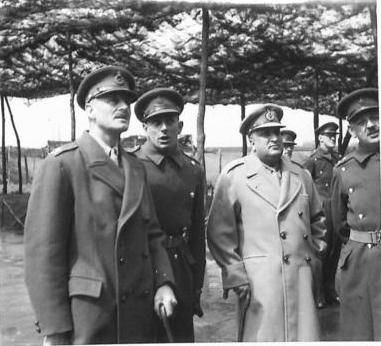
Maharaja Hari Singh visiting coastal artillery guns at Dover

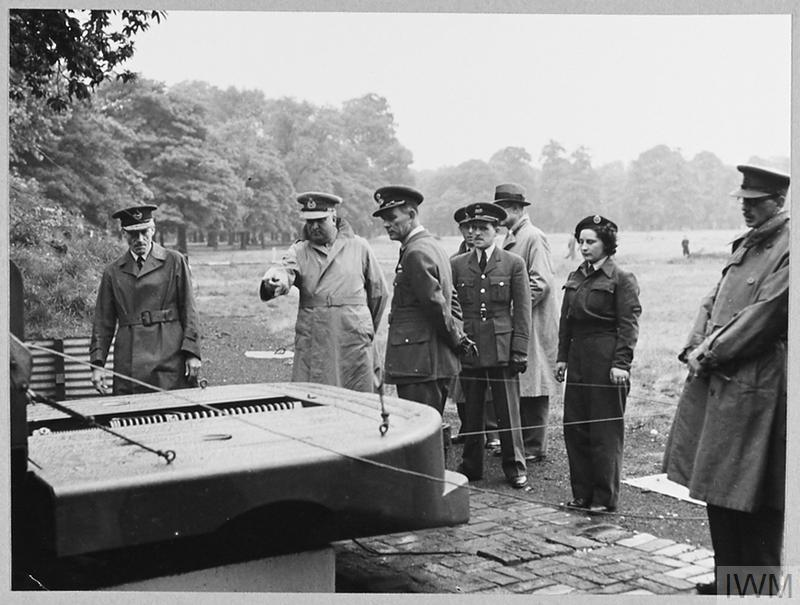
Maharaja Hari Singh visiting balloon launcher at London

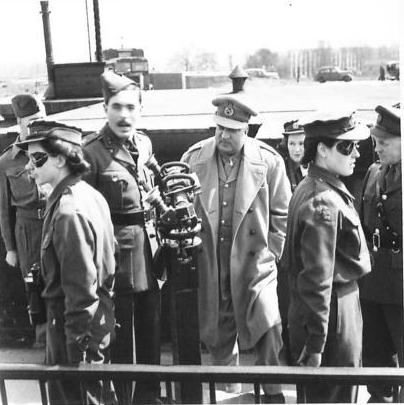
Maharaja Hari Singh scrutinising telescope of anti-aircraft guns

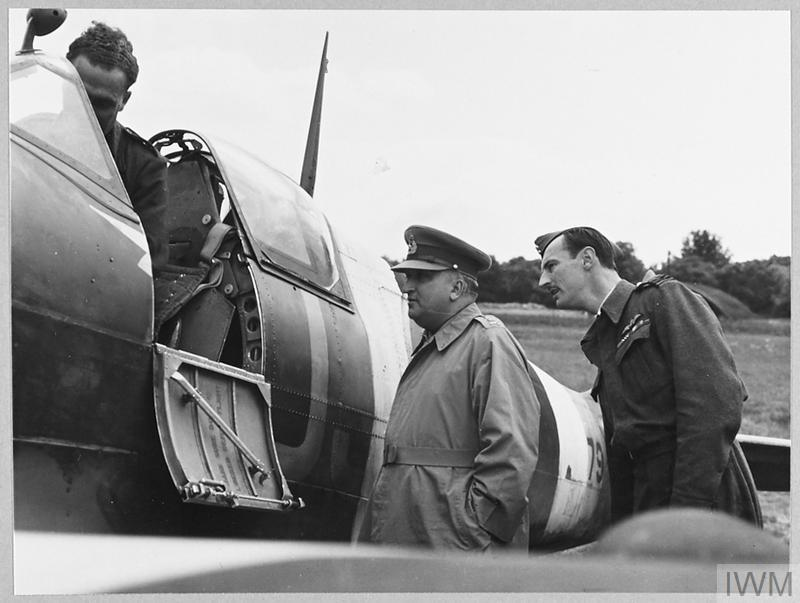
Maharaja Hari Singh inspecting Supermarine Spitfire Mk IX UTI

In 1944, Maharaja Hari Singh had the honour of meeting Winston Churchill in England, for three months he attended several official meetings and inspected wartime efforts. His return journey in June took him through Iran aboard his Avro Anson, where units of the J&K State Forces were stationed, he was warmly welcomed in Srinagar by representatives of both major political parties — the All Jammu and Kashmir Muslim Conference and the Jammu & Kashmir National Conference; Sheikh Abdullah garlanded him and presented the New Kashmir draft. That same year, the National Conference adopted the manifesto with mass public support, while Jinnah's attempt to sway Abdullah toward the two-nation theory failed.

== Final years and death ==
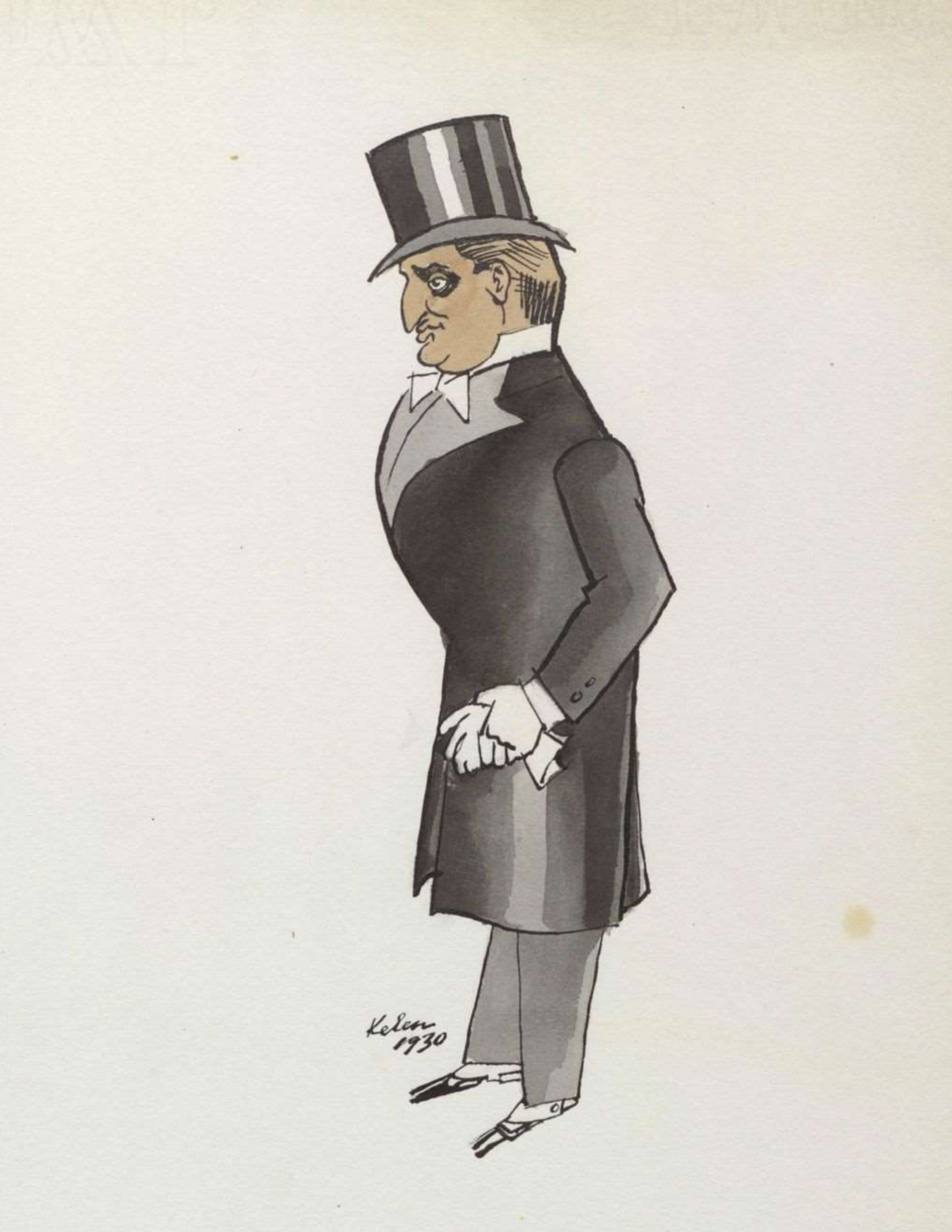
Caricature of Hari Singh by Emery Kelen

After signing the instrument of accession with India, Hari Singh was banished from Jammu and Kashmir. He departed from Jammu on April 28, 1949, for New Delhi and never came back again, there on June 9, 1949, he signed a proclamation appointing his 18-year-old son, Yuvraj Karan Singh, as the Regent of Jammu and Kashmir. On June 20, 1949, his son arrived in Jammu as Regent, while the Maharaja left for Bombay the same day and settled there for the rest of his life.

Maharaja Hari Singh's letter to President Rajendra Prasad dated 16–17 August 1952 from exile in Poona, poured out his anguish, a passionate defence of his legacy, an indictment of broken promises, and a plea for justice amidst political betrayal.

He died on 26 April 1961, after fourteen years of banishment. As per his will, Hari Singh's ashes were flown to Jammu in a chartered plane, scattered across Jammu and Kashmir, and immersed in the Tawi River at Jammu, with funds he had personally allocated for the purpose.

After abdicating, Singh moved to Bombay with a $100,000 annual allowance and raised polo ponies. He famously kept one apartment under constant construction, fearing a prophecy that he'd die once it was finished.

== Legacy and memorials ==
=== Tributes and memorials ===
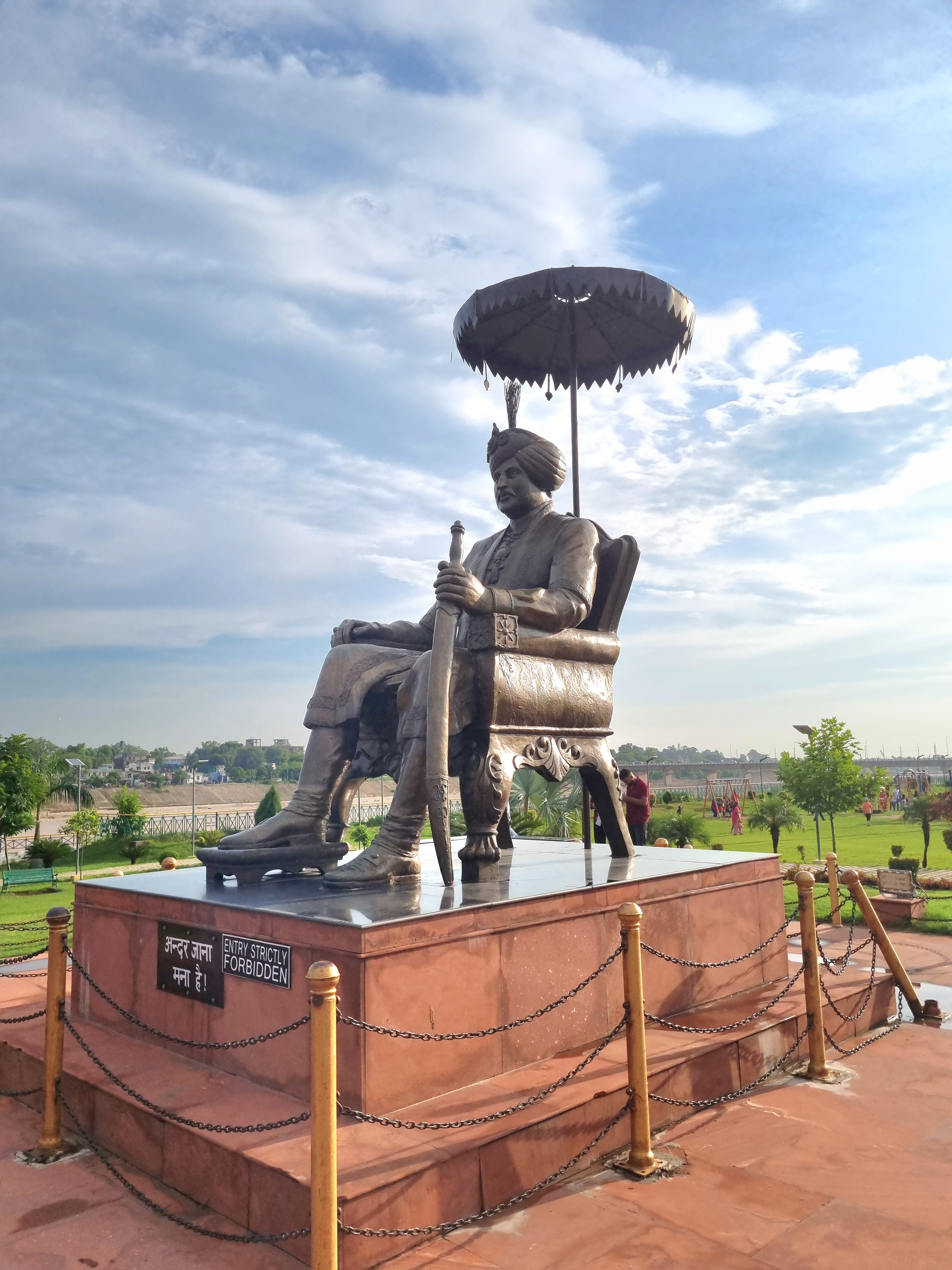
Statue of Maharaja Hari Singh at Hari Singh Park, Jammu

- On 13 April 1975, Prime Minister Indira Gandhi inaugurated Amar Mahal Museum and Library in Jammu exhibiting 120 kg 'Dogra Gold Throne' on which Hari Singh once reigned. The French designed cheâteau constructed in 1890 was donated by Dr Karan Singh to Hari-Tara Charitable Trust on 15 January 1970, displays permanent painting galleries and encompasses 25,000 books of antique value.
- In 1983 Hari Singh's jewellery, which includes crowns, ceremonial swords, necklaces, bracelets, rings, bangles, robes, daggers, watches, and even toys stored in trunks to be turned into a museum, was revealed by Srinagar's Treasury office.
- In November 1995, the Maharaja Hari Singh Memorial Cup was founded by Vikramaditya Singh, Chairman of the Royal Kashmir Polo Foundation which hosted the event till 2018. It was sanctioned by the Indian Polo Association as a 10–14 goal tournament and was held primarily during Delhi's Fall and Spring polo seasons, at New Delhi, Jaipur and with occasional events in Jammu and Kashmir. Top teams included Jindal Panther, Army, Mundota Fort, Sahara Warriors and Royal Kashmir Polo.
- On 24 January 2000, Captain Dewan Singh and Padma Shri Punam Suri President D.A.V. College Managing Committee unveiled a bust of Hari Singh at Maharaja Hari Singh Agricultural Collegiate School MHAC, formerly Hari Singh's polo and horse racing ground.
- In 2007, Chief Minister Ghulam Nabi Azad inaugurated the 'Hari Singh Janana Park' for women. It is landscaped by the Gardens and Floriculture Department at New Secretariat.
- On 1 April 2012, the occasion of Ram Navami, Union Minister Ghulam Nabi Azad and MP Karan Singh unveiled a statue of Hari Singh near the Tawi bridge in Jammu.
- Sh Kavinder Gupta Mayor of Jammu Municipal Corporation erected a statue of Maharaja Hari Singh in standing posture near Bagh-e-Bahu Police Station adjoining junction crossings linking Gujjar Nagar Tawi Bridge, Jammu University, Bagh-e-Bahu, Narwal
- On 16 May 2018, Chief Minister Mehbooba Mufti along with Deputy Chief Minister Dr Nirmal Singh inaugurated 'Maharaja Hari Singh Park' wherein statue of Maharaja Hari Singh in sitting posture is the main attraction of this park.
- On 23 September 2019, the Amar Kshatriya Rajput Sabha (AKRS) installed a life-sized statue of Hari Singh on his 119th birthday at Samba district, near Veer Bhoomi Park.
- On 23 September 2020, an audio-video song album in Dogri was released highlighting social reforms introduced by Hari Singh from 1930 onwards.
- On 23 September 2021, Sh Ravinder Raina BJP Jammu President unveiled a statue of Hari Singh at Dr. Syama Prasad Mukherjee Bhawan, Sec. 3 Extn, Trikuta Nagar, Jammu, Jammu & Kashmir, the party headquarters.
- 23 September 2022 is declared as public holiday on the birth anniversary of Maharaja Hari Singh under Negotiable Instrument Act, 1881 (Central Act 26 of 1881) across Union territory of Jammu and Kashmir.

Public Utilities bearing his name

- Hari Singh School, Kanji House Jammu since 1933, located next to Mubarak Mandi Palace is Govt. Education Department's co-educational J&K Board affiliated school from 9th to 12th class.
- Sri Maharaja Hari Singh SMHS Hospital or Headwin Hospital Gole Market, Karan Nagar area of Srinagar since 1945, inaugurated by Viceroy of India Lord Wavell, then subcontinent's biggest hospital, built by Hari Singh at the cost of Rupees Thirty five lakhs, now is a Government owned general hospital and medical college.
- Maharaja Hari Singh Agricultural Collegiate (MHAC) School Nagbani, P O Domana Jammu since 1967, a C.B.S.E affiliated residential as well as day boarding school.
- Maharaja Hari Singh DAV Sr. Sec. School Akhnoor City since 1982 is a C.B.S.E affiliated school from nursery to 12th class.
- Maharaja Hari Singh DAV Sr. Sec. Public School Poonch Kanuyian since 1982 is a J&K Board affiliated school from nursery to 12th class.
- Maharaja Hari Singh DAV Sr. Sec. Public School R. S Pura since 1982 is a J&K Board affiliated school from nursery to 12th class.
- Government Hari Singh Higher Secondary School Prem Nagar via Residency Road Jammu, is a J&K Board affiliated school from 1st to 12th standards and since 2018 an additional school for specially-abled children provisioned in new building with residential facilities.
- Government Hari Singh Higher Secondary School Anand Nagar Rd. (Camp) Bohri Jammu, is a J&K Board affiliated school from 1st to 12th standards.

Commercial places bearing his name

- Hari Singh High Street Srinagar, is named for him. It contains 105 gold adornment shops and numerous luxury item boutiques.
- Hari Niwas Palace Jammu on the shores of River Tawi, his Jammu guest house, is now run as a heritage hotel with views of the Trikuta Hills and Vaishno Devi.
- Hari Market Jammu is located on the outskirts of Raghunath Temple Jammu and is connected by multi-tier parking. The market primarily sells dried fruits and souvenirs.

== Personal life ==
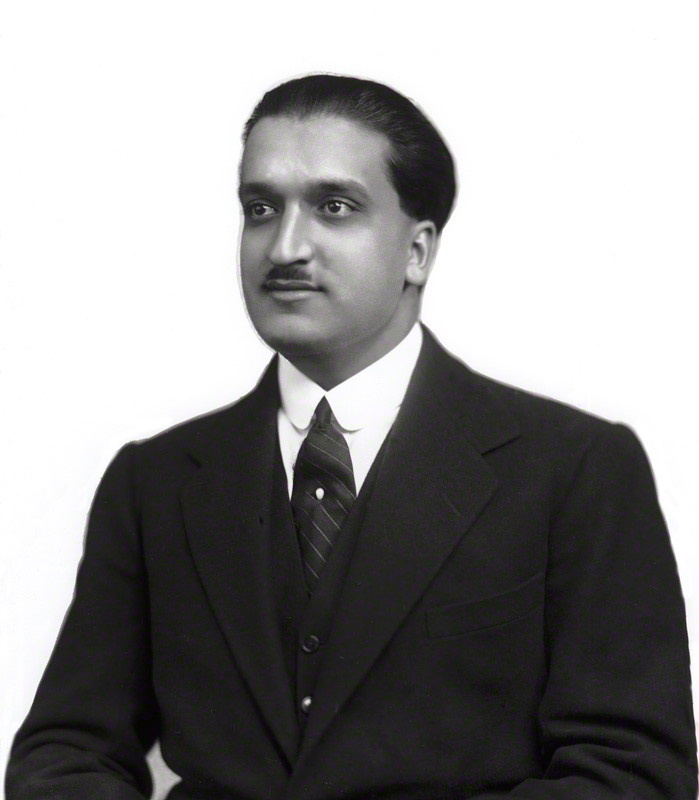
Hari Singh in 1920

=== Mr A.'s Blackmail case ===
Maharaja Hari Singh, aged 24, on his maiden visit to Europe in 1919, unfamiliar with Western settings, fell victim to a "love trap" during his visit to Europe, where he was lured into a compromising situation by not so attractive woman named Maudie Robinson. The encounter was used for blackmail to avoid citation in a divorce case, reportedly with the silent support of British officials, leading to a demand for a large sum of money. A discreet settlement was ensured so that the incident never reaches court or subjects. A similar case involved Maharaja Sayajirao Gaekwad III of Baroda, who also faced scandal during a European trip, highlighting how Indian royals were vulnerable to such schemes abroad.

On 27 December 1919, Hari Singh handed over two cheques, B204561 and B204562 totalling £300,000 (roughly £15,200,000 today) to his Irish aide-de-camp (ADC), Captain Charles William Augustus Arthur, who, in conspiracy with English criminals—Monty Newton, a notorious card sharp, and William Cooper Hobbs, a corrupt solicitor's clerk and the so-called "Mr Big" of London's underworld—betrayed and defrauded him.

As the real criminal conspiracy was orchestrated by others, Maudie Robinson's real husband demanded money taken under his name under threat of scandal. The case, Charles Ernest Robinson v Midland Bank, was heard in the King's Bench Division of the Royal Courts of Justice on 19 November 1924, presided over by Lord Justice Darling. Robinson's lawyers, son of Lord Halsbury and John Paul Valetta, alleged that they had received only £21,000 from an out of court settlements, claiming they had been unfairly deprived of the remainder by the bank. During the eight days of proceedings, efforts were made by the India Office to keep a certain individual's identity confidential by referring to him as "Mr. A." In court, Lord John Simon—representing the Midland Bank—vigorously defended the institution. Eventually, the truth emerged in court with the inputs from Scotland Yard detective Percy J. Smith. The court ruled in favor of the Bank, despite the jury exonerating Mr. Charles Earnest Robinson and Mrs. Maudie Robinson of conspiracy, stating that no one—innocent or not—can claim proceeds from a theft. So, Robinson lost the case even though he was found innocent of the conspiracy.

The courtroom proceedings drew massive public interest, with people queuing from early morning and the courtroom packed to the extent that witnesses struggled to reach the stand. Major newspapers like The Times and The Daily Telegraph dedicated full pages daily to the case, highlighting its sensational nature. Media magnates like Lord Beaverbrook and Sir Edward Hulton were reportedly stunned by how publicly the dramatic events unfolded. During the trial, Sir Hari was often described as an eastern potentate, and suspicion extended to all Asian royalty, who were seen as opposing secrecy.

The name of Mr. A's ADC was revealed after his arrest on 2 December, awaiting trials in Palais de Justice, imprisoned at La Santé prison (France), but Mr. A's identity remained a secret despite wide speculation in Paris. On 3 December 1924, the India Office finally permitted the disclosure of his name. It was first announced on the London radio station 2LO, which interrupted its music programme for the news. India Office in Britain decided to close the files for a hundred years rather than the usual thirty years as the case involved espionage. Daily News, Petit Journal, News of the World, The People investigated developments, verified backgrounds, and tracked case proceedings. On 4 December 1924, Daily Express (UK), Daily Chronicle (UK) and Daily Herald (UK); The Cairns Post (Australia) and Northern Star (Australia) on 5 December 1924, Time magazine on 15 December 1924, Kingston Gleaner (Jamaica) on 16 December 1924, all published reports revealing the official identification of Maharaja Hari Singh as the central figure in the sensational blackmail case.

On 19 December 1924, Hari Singh was in Kashmir, recovering from a serious leg injury caused by a tobogganing accident. Around the same time, he fell into deep depression due to the "Mr A Case" and was reluctant to travel to London to give evidence. On Christmas Day 1924, Lord Reading noted Hari Singh's remorse and that his uncle, the Maharaja of Kashmir, had refused his resignation and granted him two to three months' leave to recover his mental balance.

Time magazine revisited the scandal on May 5, 1961, after Maharaja Hari Singh's death, portraying it as an enduring stain on his legacy. The article suggested that his naivety, combined with betrayal and disloyalty from those he trusted most, shaped his suspicious nature. Over time, this lack of trust in both India and Pakistan may have played a role in laying the groundwork for the India-Pakistan conflict over Kashmir.

=== Personal wealth ===
He was one of Rolls-Royce's most valued clients, eventually acquiring at least 26 of the marque's cars over the years, which included Rolls-Royce Phantom I 17EX

Despite having a $10 million annual income, a silver-plated Avro Anson 18C VT plane in which he travelled during World War II, and a Versace styled palace in Srinagar—now a luxurious hotel—Sir Hari lived in opulence.

=== Marriages ===
Hari Singh with his fourth wife, Maharani Tara Devi, 1950

Singh married four times as he faced disturbances in his private life. Two of his wives died childless and a third Rajasthani bride was sent back with honour, to her parents' house as the couple could not establish an emotional connection. Also, Hari Singh faced political and domestic conspiracies at this time and thought it appropriate to send back the third wife to safety. With his last wife, Tara Devi Sahiba of Kangra, he had a son, Karan Singh.

No.	Name	Date of marriage	Fate of marriage	Issue and fate
1	Rani Sri Lal Kunverba Sahiba	7 May 1913	Ended with her death	Died during pregnancy in 1915. No issue.
2	Rani Sahiba Chamba	8 November 1915	Ended with her death	Died 31 January 1920. No issue.
3	Maharani Dhanvant Kunveri Baiji Sahiba	30 April 1923	Ended	Died young. No issue.
4	Maharani Tara Devi Sahiba of Kangra	1928	Separated	Separated in 1950. Died in 1967. Mother of Karan Singh

== Titles and honours ==
=== Title and style ===
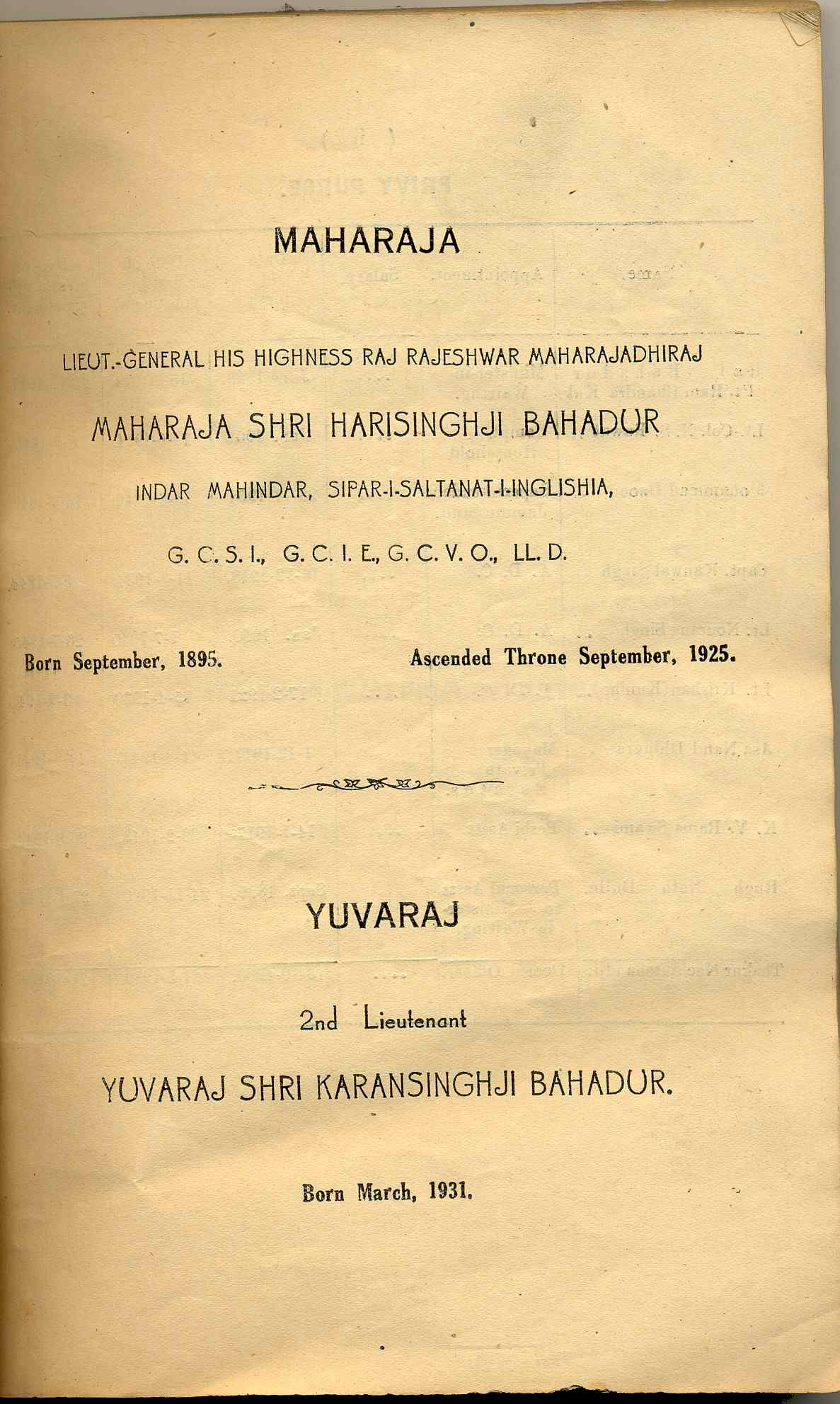
Titles of Maharaja Hari Singh and Yuvraj Karan Singh on the first page of his Civil List of 1945

As Maharaja, Hari Singh's full style was:

Lieutenant-General His Highness Raj Rajeshwar Maharajadhiraj Maharaja Shri Hari Singhji Bahadur Indar Mahindar, Sipar-i-Saltanat-i-Inglishia, GCSI, GCIE, GCVO, LLD

=== Honours ===
- 1903: Delhi Durbar Medal
- 1911: Delhi Durbar Medal
- 1922: Prince of Wales Visit Medal
- 1929: Knight Grand Commander of the Order of the Indian Empire (GCIE) (KCIE in 1918)
- 1930: Grand Cross of the Order of the Crown of Italy
- 1933: Knight Grand Commander of the Order of the Star of India (GCSI)
- 1935: King George V Silver Jubilee Medal
- 1937: King George VI Coronation Medal
- 1938: Grand Officer of the Legion d'Honneur
- 1945: 1939–1945 Star
- 1945: Africa Star
- 1945: War Medal 1939–1945
- 1945: India Service Medal
- 1946: Knight Grand Cross of the Royal Victorian Order (GCVO) (KCVO in 1922)
- 1948: Indian Independence Medal

=== Honorary degrees ===
- 1938: Hon. LL.D from Punjab University

== Bibliography ==
- Mufti, Gulzar (2013), Kashmir in Sickness and in Health, Partridge Publishing India, ISBN 978-1-4828-0998-5
- Rai, Mridu (2004), Hindu Rulers, Muslim Subjects: Islam, Rights, and the History of Kashmir, C. Hurst & Co, ISBN 1850656614
- Schofield, Victoria (2003) [First published in 2000], Kashmir in Conflict, London and New York: I. B. Taurus & Co, ISBN 978-1860648984

Hari Singh Dogra dynasty Born: September 1895 Died: 26 April 1961
Regnal titles
Preceded by Pratap Singh (as Maharaja of Jammu and Kashmir)	Maharaja of Jammu and Kashmir; 1925–1952	Succeeded by Republic of India; Karan Singh as titular Maharajah of Jammu and Kashmir
