= Qazi Mohammad Afzal =

Indian politician

Member of the Legislative Assembly
- In office 2002–2008
- Preceded by: Farooq Abdullah
- Succeeded by: Omar Abdullah
- Constituency: Ganderbal

Forest Minister of Jammu & Kashmir
- In office 2002–2008

Personal details
- Died: 1 March 2019 Srinagar, India
- Party: Peoples Democratic Party
- Occupation: Politician

Qazi Mohammad Afzal was an Indian politician from Jammu and Kashmir, belonging to the Peoples Democratic Party. He served as a Member of the Legislative Assembly from 2002 to 2008. He gained prominence for his victory over Omar Abdullah, the president of the National Conference (NC), in the Ganderbal Assembly constituency during the 2002 assembly elections.

He was appointed a cabinet minister in the PDP-Congress coalition government led by Mufti Mohammad Sayeed. He served as the Forest Minister from 2002 to 2008, contributing to governance and policy-making in the state.

During his tenure as Forest Minister, Afzal was at the center of a controversial decision. In 2008, he issued the Amarnath land order, which led to protests in the Valley and intensified tensions between the Jammu and Kashmir regions. He resigned from the cabinet in September 2007 after being accused of corruption and subsequently losing the forest portfolio. He had also served as the Cabinet Minister handling the portfolio of Housing and Urban Development.

He contested as a PDP candidate but he could not win in both the 2008 and 2014 elections. He died on 1 March 2019, in Srinagar.
