= Kashmir Conspiracy case =

Legal case filed by the government of India

Kashmir Conspiracy Case was the legal case filed by government of Kashmir and Investigations Department of the government of India, by which Sheikh Abdullah and others were arrested and jailed. Abdullah along with Mirza Afzal Beg and 22 others, who were accused of conspiracy against the state for allegedly espousing the cause of an independent Kashmir. The case was framed in 1958, for which the trial began in 1959 but was withdrawn in 1964 as a diplomatic decision.

== History of the case ==
On 8 August 1953 Sheikh Abdullah was dismissed as prime minister by the then Sadr-i-Riyasat (Constitutional Head of State) Dr. Karan Singh son of the erstwhile Maharajah Hari Singh on the charge that he had lost the confidence of his cabinet. He was denied the opportunity to prove his majority on the floor of the house, and Bakshi Ghulam Mohammed was appointed as prime minister. Abdullah was arrested soon after in year 1953 for anti-national activities.

Following the dismissal of Sheikh Abdullah, his lieutenant Mirza Afzal Beg formed the Plebiscite Front on 9 August 1955 demanding a plebiscite to decide the accession of the state and the unconditional release of Abdullah. Abdullah meanwhile was released for a short time and later again re-arrested on charges of conspiracy against the state. The legal case initiated in 1958 came to be known as the Kashmir Conspiracy Case.

Bakshi Ghulam Mohammad, who was appointed as Prime Minister of Jammu & Kashmir, said in his radio broadcast that:

"A fraud was being committed on the interests of the country. The slogan of independence was dangerous. Under the control of an imperialist power an independent Kashmir would have been a serious danger for the people of India and Pakistan...."

Before his dismissal, arrest, brief release and re-arrest under the case, the intelligence agency had collected ample proof regarding the Sheikh's links with Pakistan and of his speeches and activities to these affect, after which Bakshi rearrested Sheikh Abdullah. The entire matter relating to the alleged conspiracy of the Sheikh for joining hands with Pakistan was submitted to Nehru along with documentary evidence and recorded tapes of his public speeches. Jawaharlal Nehru was taken aback while listening to the tapes and going through the letters of Sheikh Abdullah. He approved launching of a case against the Sheikh, his one time very close friend. Thus, the Kashmir conspiracy case was launched against Sheikh Abdullah, Mirza Afzal Beg and 22 other people on charge of having conspired with Pakistan for making of an independent Kashmir.

The counsel of Government, between 9 August 1952 and 29 April 1958, in his several briefs before the court, stated that the accused and their accomplices both inside and outside the state collaborated with Pakistani officials to overthrow the Government with violence. Their intention was to overthrow the Government and to annex the state with Pakistan through the process to spread hatred in the masses against the Government. The court was shown that, while Sheikh Abdullah was in jail his wife Begum Akbar Jahan Abdullah and allies, Mirza Afzal Beg, Ghulam Mohammad Chikan, Mir Ghulam Rasool, Pir Maqbool Gilani, Khwaja Ali Shah and others, received large amount of money from Pakistan for this purpose. They also received type-writers and litho-machines and literature for propaganda purposes. Besides explosives were received from Pakistan for blowing up bridges, factories, military installations, mosques, temples and Gurudwaras in Jammu & Kashmir, so that the Government machinery may be paralyzed. People were trained in Pakistan to come and create havoc here. Part of Abdullah's defence in the case was that many of the documents relied on to show his involvement were forged by the Central Intelligence Agency.

The trials began in 1959 and were heard over several years, when in 1962 the special Magistrate, transferred the case to higher court that all the accused be tried under Indian Penal Code, under sections for which punishment was either death or life-imprisonment. But certain later developments like Hazratbal disappearance episode in Kashmir, lead to Nehru's decision to drop the case. Sheikh Abdullah spent almost eleven years behind bars from 1953 till 1964 (six years after being accused under the case), while others were held from 1958 till 1964. In 1964, when whole nation was eagerly awaiting the outcome of the case and the judgement of the court, the case was withdrawn and all the accused were released as a part of controversial and sudden diplomatic decision taken by Jawaharlal Nehru, the erstwhile Prime Minister of India and Ghulam Mohammed Sadiq, the erstwhile Prime Minister of Jammu and Kashmir.
