= Sheikh Mustafa Kamal =

Indian politician (1939–2026)

Cabinet Minister in Jammu and Kashmir Government
- In office 1983–2002

Member of the Jammu and Kashmir Legislative Assembly
- In office 1987–2002
- Constituency: Gulmarg

Member of the Jammu and Kashmir Legislative Council
- In office 1983–1987

Personal details
- Born: 11 November 1939 Soura Srinagar, Jammu and Kashmir, India
- Died: 14 July 2026 (aged 86) Srinagar, Jammu and Kashmir, India
- Party: Jammu & Kashmir National Conference
- Relations: Farooq Abdullah (brother); Omar Abdullah (nephew)
- Parent(s): Sheikh Abdullah (father); Begum Akbar Jahan Abdullah (mother)

Sheikh Mustafa Kamal (11 November 1939 – 14 July 2026) was an Indian politician and one of the leaders of the Jammu & Kashmir National Conference Party in Jammu and Kashmir. He served in the state cabinets formed in 1983, 1987 and 1996.

Kamal was the son of Kashmiri leader Sheikh Abdullah, the brother of former Chief Minister of Jammu and Kashmir Farooq Abdullah and the uncle of the Chief Minister Omar Abdullah.

Kamal died on 14 July 2026, at the age of 86.
