= Ganderbal Assembly constituency =

Constituency of the Jammu and Kashmir Legislative Assembly

Coordinates: 34.217°N 74.771°E

Ganderbal
- Constituency No. 18 for the Jammu and Kashmir Legislative Assembly

Constituency details
- Country: India
- State: Jammu and Kashmir
- District: Ganderbal
- Lok Sabha constituency: Srinagar
- Established: 1962

Member of Legislative Assembly
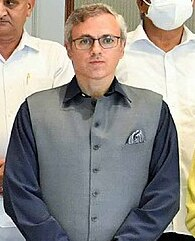
- Incumbent Omar Abdullah; Chief Minister of Jammu and Kashmir
- Party: JKNC
- Elected year: 2024

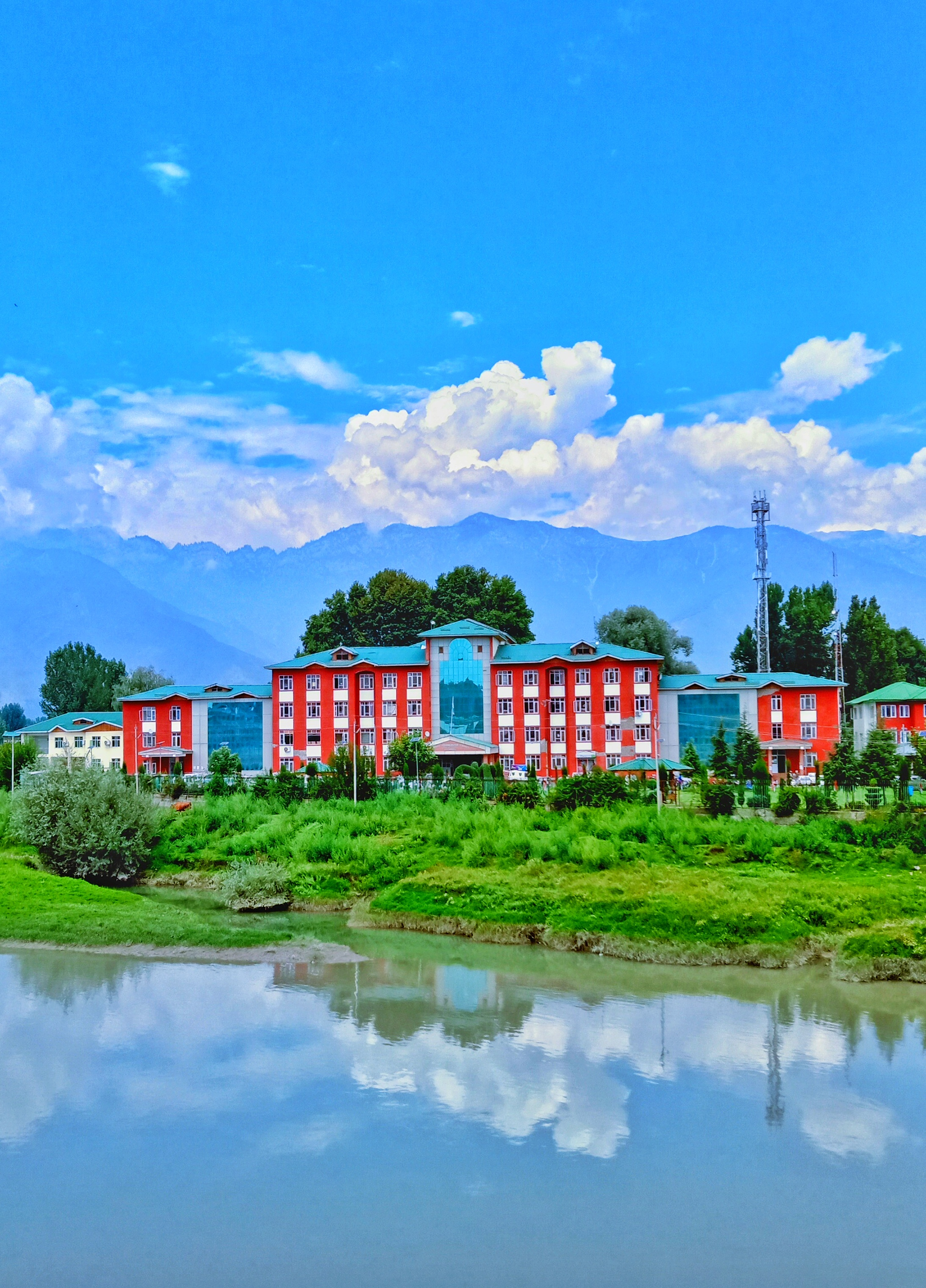
Ganderbal (constituency of the Jammu and Kashmir Legislative Assembly)

Ganderbal Assembly constituency is one of the 90 constituencies in the Jammu and Kashmir Legislative Assembly of Jammu and Kashmir a north state of India. Ganderbal is also part of Srinagar Lok Sabha constituency. The current Chief minister of Jammu and Kashmir Omar Abdullah represents this constituency.

== Members of the Legislative Assembly ==
Election	Member	Party
1962	Abdul Salam Aitu	Jammu and Kashmir National Conference
1967	Muhammad Maqbool Bhat	Indian National Congress
1972	Muhammad Maqbool Bhat	Indian National Congress
1977	Sheikh Mohammad Abdullah	Jammu and Kashmir National Conference
1983	Farooq Abdullah	Jammu and Kashmir National Conference
1987	Farooq Abdullah	Jammu and Kashmir National Conference
1996	Farooq Abdullah	Jammu and Kashmir National Conference
2002	Qazi Mohammad Afzal	Jammu and Kashmir Peoples Democratic Party
2008	Omar Abdullah	Jammu and Kashmir National Conference
2014	Ishfaq Ahmad Sheikh	Jammu and Kashmir National Conference
2024	Omar Abdullah	Jammu and Kashmir National Conference

== Election results ==
=== Assembly Election 2024 ===
2024 Jammu and Kashmir Legislative Assembly election : Ganderbal
Party	Candidate	Votes	%	±%
JKNC	Omar Abdullah	32,727	43.80%	New
JKPDP	Bashir Ahmad Mir	22,153	29.65%	▼5.62
Independent	Ishfaq Ahmad Sheikh	6,060	8.11%	New
DPAP	Qaiser Sultan Ganaie	3,781	5.06%	New
Independent	Farooq Ahmad Bhat	2,732	3.66%	New
NOTA	None of the Above	1,713	2.29%	▲0.80
JKAP	Qazi Mubisher Farooq	1,160	1.55%	New
Independent	Ashiq Ahmad Sheikh	963	1.29%	New
Independent	Javed Ahmad Khan	765	1.02%	New
Independent	Maajid Ashraf Mir	621	0.83%	New
RLJP	Tariq Ahmad Zargar	460	0.62%	New
Margin of victory		10,574	14.15%	▲13.04
Turnout		74,716	57.91%	▼1.19
Registered electors		1,29,013		▲42.43
JKNC gain from JKNC		Swing	▲7.42	

=== Assembly Election 2014 ===
2014 Jammu and Kashmir Legislative Assembly election : Ganderbal
Party	Candidate	Votes	%	±%
JKNC	Ishfaq Ahmad Sheikh	19,478	36.38%	▼5.11
JKPDP	Qazi Mohammad Afzal	18,881	35.27%	▲14.41
Independent	Sheikh Ghulam Ahmad	6,009	11.22%	New
INC	Mohammad Yousuf Bhat	3,190	5.96%	▼14.33
Independent	Ghulam Rasool Mir	1,236	2.31%	New
Independent	Bilal Ahmad Khanday	1,057	1.97%	New
NOTA	None of the Above	800	1.49%	New
BJP	Sheikh Abdul Rasheed	671	1.25%	▼0.13
Independent	Javed Ahmad Khan	660	1.23%	New
Independent	Hilal Ahmad Dar	489	0.91%	New
JKPC	Abdul Majeed Dhobi	321	0.60%	New
Margin of victory		597	1.12%	▼19.52
Turnout		53,539	59.11%	▲7.37
Registered electors		90,582		▲17.68
JKNC hold		Swing	▼5.11	

=== Assembly Election 2008 ===
2008 Jammu and Kashmir Legislative Assembly election : Ganderbal
Party	Candidate	Votes	%	±%
JKNC	Omar Abdullah	16,519	41.49%	▲5.14
JKPDP	Qazi Mohammad Afzal	8,304	20.85%	▼27.41
INC	Ishfaq Ahmad Sheikh	8,077	20.28%	New
Jammu & Kashmir Democratic Party Nationalist	Farooq Ahmad Dar	2,622	6.58%	New
RJD	Bashir Ahmed Bhat	759	1.91%	New
Backward Classes Democratic Party, J&K	Ghulam Hassan Dar	737	1.85%	New
Independent	Nissar Ahmad Bhat	726	1.82%	New
JKANC	Nazir Ahmad Lone	678	1.70%	New
BJP	Abdul Rashid Sheikh	551	1.38%	▼0.94
JKNPP	Farooq Ahmad	375	0.94%	New
BSP	Ali Mohammad Baba	374	0.94%	New
Margin of victory		8,215	20.63%	▲8.71
Turnout		39,818	51.73%	▲16.53
Registered electors		76,971		▲12.53
JKNC gain from JKPDP		Swing	▼6.78	

=== Assembly Election 2002 ===
2002 Jammu and Kashmir Legislative Assembly election : Ganderbal
Party	Candidate	Votes	%	±%
JKPDP	Qazi Mohammad Afzal	11,622	48.26%	New
JKNC	Omar Abdullah	8,752	36.34%	▼33.90
Independent	Ghulam Hassan Shah	1,144	4.75%	New
Independent	Abdul Rashid Rather	1,105	4.59%	New
JKAL	Peer Ali Shah	898	3.73%	New
BJP	Abdul Rashid	560	2.33%	New
Margin of victory		2,870	11.92%	▼42.87
Turnout		24,081	35.21%	▼12.02
Registered electors		68,402		▲38.02
JKPDP gain from JKNC		Swing	▼21.99	

=== Assembly Election 1996 ===
1996 Jammu and Kashmir Legislative Assembly election : Ganderbal
Party	Candidate	Votes	%	±%
JKNC	Farooq Abdullah	16,440	70.25%	▼8.50
INC	Qazi Mohammad Afzal	3,617	15.46%	New
Independent	Mohammed Yousuf	1,729	7.39%	New
JD	Mohammed Akbar	1,617	6.91%	New
Margin of victory		12,823	54.79%	▼4.58
Turnout		23,403	50.62%	▼34.43
Registered electors		49,558		▲5.33
JKNC hold		Swing	▼8.50	

=== Assembly Election 1987 ===
1987 Jammu and Kashmir Legislative Assembly election : Ganderbal
Party	Candidate	Votes	%	±%
JKNC	Farooq Abdullah	30,255	78.75%	▼17.06
Independent	Abdul Khaliq Sofi	7,446	19.38%	New
Independent	Ghulam Hassan Mir	609	1.59%	New
Margin of victory		22,809	59.37%	▼32.78
Turnout		38,418	83.37%	▼3.20
Registered electors		47,051		▲18.31
JKNC hold		Swing		

=== Assembly Election 1983 ===
1983 Jammu and Kashmir Legislative Assembly election : Ganderbal
Party	Candidate	Votes	%	±%
JKNC	Farooq Abdullah	32,331	95.81%	▲7.64
INC	Ghulam Mohi Ud Din Saiati	1,235	3.66%	New
Margin of victory		31,096	92.15%	▲15.80
Turnout		33,745	86.32%	▲0.36
Registered electors		39,769		▲13.24
JKNC hold		Swing		

=== Assembly Election 1977 ===
1977 Jammu and Kashmir Legislative Assembly election : Ganderbal
Party	Candidate	Votes	%	±%
JKNC	Sheikh Abdullah	26,162	88.17%	New
Independent	Ali Mohammed Taria	3,509	11.83%	New
Margin of victory		22,653	76.35%	▲29.50
Turnout		29,671	87.27%	▲24.09
Registered electors		35,118		▲19.18
JKNC gain from INC		Swing		

=== Assembly Election 1972 ===
1972 Jammu and Kashmir Legislative Assembly election : Ganderbal
Party	Candidate	Votes	%	±%
INC	Mohammed Maqbool Bhat	11,891	66.81%	New
JI	Ghulam Mohammed Ganai	3,554	19.97%	New
Independent	Bashir Ahmed Beg	1,250	7.02%	New
SWA	Ghulam Ahmed Bhat	604	3.39%	New
Independent	Mohammed Ismail	498	2.80%	New
Margin of victory		8,337	46.84%	
Turnout		17,797	62.43%	▲60.40
Registered electors		29,466		▲19.55
INC hold		Swing		

=== Assembly Election 1967 ===
1967 Jammu and Kashmir Legislative Assembly election : Ganderbal
Party	Candidate	Votes	%	±%
INC	Mohammed Maqbool Bhat	Unopposed		
Registered electors		24,647		▼5.80
INC gain from JKNC		Swing		

=== Assembly Election 1962 ===
1962 Jammu and Kashmir Legislative Assembly election : Ganderbal
Party	Candidate	Votes	%	±%
JKNC	Abdul Salam Aitu	Unopposed		
Registered electors		26,165		
JKNC win (new seat)				

== See also ==
- Ganderbal
- List of constituencies of Jammu and Kashmir Legislative Assembly
