= Sheikh Abdullah =

Indian politician (1905–1982)

Sheikh Mohammad Abdullah
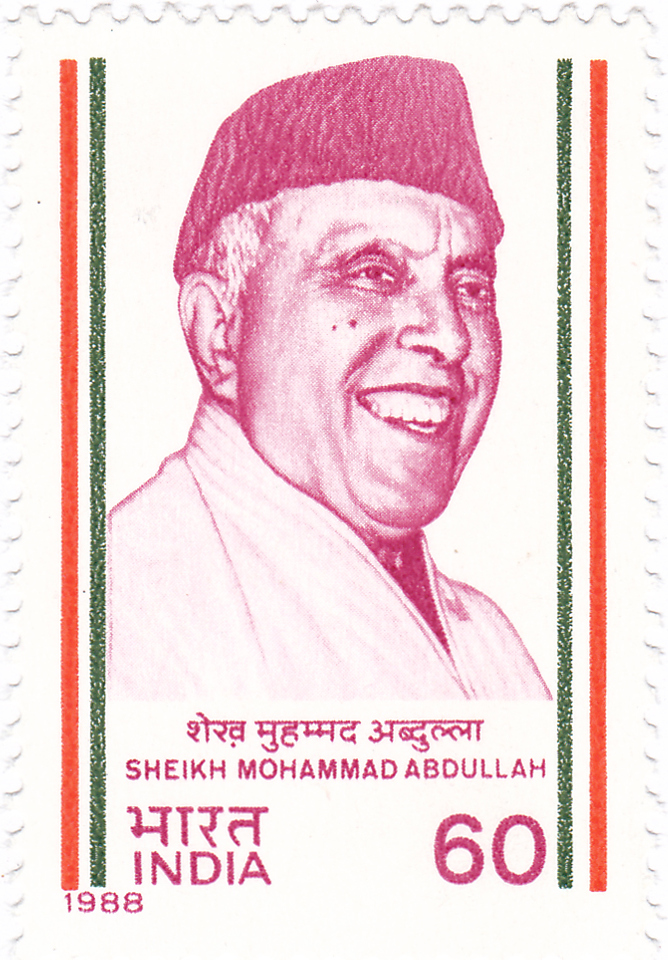
- Abdullah on a 1988 stamp of India

2nd Prime Minister of Jammu and Kashmir
- In office 5 March 1948 – 9 August 1953
- Preceded by: Mehr Chand Mahajan
- Succeeded by: Bakshi Ghulam Mohammad

3rd and 4th Chief Minister of Jammu and Kashmir
- In office 25 February 1975 – 26 March 1977
- Governor: Lakshmi Kant Jha
- Preceded by: Syed Mir Qasim
- Succeeded by: Governor's rule
- In office 9 July 1977 – 8 September 1982
- Governor: Lakshmi Kant Jha (until 1981); Braj Kumar Nehru (from 1981)
- Preceded by: Governor's rule
- Succeeded by: Farooq Abdullah

President of Jammu & Kashmir National Conference
- In office October 1932 – August 1981
- Preceded by: Office established
- Succeeded by: Farooq Abdullah

Member of the Jammu and Kashmir Legislative Assembly
- In office 1977–1982
- Preceded by: Muhammad Maqbool Bhat
- Succeeded by: Farooq Abdullah
- Constituency: Ganderbal

Personal details
- Born: 5 December 1905 Soura, Jammu and Kashmir, British India
- Died: 8 September 1982 (aged 76) Srinagar, Jammu and Kashmir, India
- Resting place: Sher-e-Kashmir Mazaar
- Party: Jammu & Kashmir National Conference
- Spouse: Begum Akbar Jehan Abdullah
- Children: Farooq; Suraiya; Mustafa; Khalida
- Education: Islamia College Lahore; Aligarh Muslim University
- Occupation: Politician

Sheikh Mohammad Abdullah (5 December 1905 – 8 September 1982) was an Indian politician who played a central role in the politics of Jammu and Kashmir. Abdullah was the founding leader and President of the Jammu and Kashmir National Conference (previously named All Jammu and Kashmir Muslim Conference). He agitated against the rule of the Maharaja Hari Singh and urged self-rule for Kashmir. He is also known as Sher-e-Kashmir ("Lion of Kashmir") and Father of the State of Jammu & Kashmir ("Baba-e-Qaum").

He served as the first elected Prime Minister of the Princely State of Jammu and Kashmir and Jammu & Kashmir as a State and was later jailed by Indian government citing his support to insurgents. He was dismissed from the position of Prime Minister on 8 August 1953 and Bakshi Ghulam Mohammad was appointed the new prime minister. The expressions 'Sadr-i-Riyasat' and 'Prime Minister' were replaced with the terms 'Governor' and 'Chief Minister' in 1965. Sheikh Abdullah again became the Chief Minister of the state following the accord with Indira Gandhi in 1974 and remained in the top slot until his death on 8 September 1982. His grandson Omar Abdullah is currently the chief minister of Jammu & Kashmir.

== Early life ==
Sheikh Abdullah was born on 5 December 1905 in Soura, a suburb on the outskirts of Srinagar, two weeks after the death of his father Sheikh Mohammed Ibrahim. As claimed by him in his autobiography Aatish-e-Chinar, his great-grandfather was a Kashmiri Hindu Brahmin of the Sapru clan, who converted to Islam after getting influenced by a Sufi preacher. His father had been a middle class manufacturer and trader of Kashmiri shawls. Abdullah was the youngest of six siblings.

He was first admitted to a traditional school or maktab in 1909, when he was four, where he learnt the recitation of the Quran and some basic Persian texts like Gulistan of Sa'di, Bustan and Padshanama. This was followed by a primary school run by the Anjuman Nusrat-ul-Islam, however the low standards of education resulted in Abdullah shifting to the district school at Visrarnaag. After five grades here he shifted to Government High School, Dilawar Bagh. He had to walk the distance of ten miles to school and back on foot, but in his own words, the joy of being allowed to obtain a school education made it seem a light work. He passed his matriculation (standard 12) examination from Punjab University in 1922.

== Higher studies ==
After matriculation he obtained admission in Shri Pratap (S. P.) College, a leading college of Kashmir. His aim was to go into the medical profession at the time. However, circumstances not permitting, he decided to try to study general science at Prince of Wales College in Jammu. He was denied admission. Then he took admission in Islamia College, Lahore and graduated from there. In 1930, he obtained an M.Sc. in Chemistry from Aligarh Muslim University. The political exposure in Lahore and Aligarh would inspire his later life.

== Political activism ==
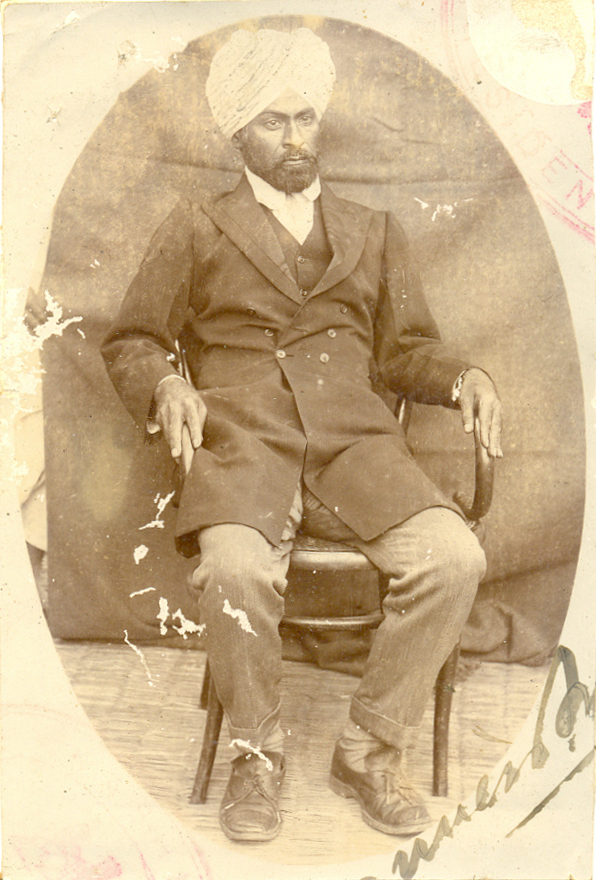
Kashmiri polymath and lawyer Molvi Abdullah. His lectures motivated Abdullah Sheikh and other educated Muslim youth to struggle for justice and fundamental rights

As a student at Aligarh Muslim University, he came in contact with and was influenced by persons with liberal and progressive ideas. Among them were prominent academicians such as Professor Mahmood (Syed Mahmood Hossain) and Marxists and left oriented freedom fighters such as Siddiq Hossain. He became convinced that the feudal system was responsible for the miseries of the Kashmiris and like all progressive nations of the world Kashmir too should have a democratically elected government.

=== Reading Room Party ===
In the 1920s there were a couple of 'reading rooms' in Srinagar which consisted of the educated youth of the area and could only be formed after acquiring the permission of the government. Forming political associations at that time was banned. In 1922, G. A. Ashai set up the Islamia School Old Boys Association (a reading room) with 20 members as part of the leadership, including Sheikh Abdullah. At this time Abdullah was still in college.

Permission to open the Fateh Kadal Reading Room Party was given in 1930 and Sheikh Abdullah became the Secretary of the party. During Abdullah's time the reading room party was located in the house of Mufti Ziauddin. For Abdullah, "the establishment of reading room(s) was an excuse"; rather it was an opportunity to get together to discuss different issues.

One of the first incidents which led Abdullah's Reading Room Party to gain wider recognition was after writing a letter to the government related to government recruitment policies. Subsequently they were called to present their views in front of the Regency Council (Note: The Regency Council represented the state in the absence of the king.) headed by G. E. C. Wakefield in October 1930. This was one of the first interactions of Sheikh Abdullah with the government and the favourable impression that Abdullah had left on Wakefield helped push his name into the public limelight.

=== Muslim Conference ===
Sheikh Abdullah and his colleagues were greatly influenced by the lectures of a Kashmiri polymath and lawyer Molvi Abdullah. Molvi Abdullah's son Molvi Abdul Rahim, Sheikh Abdullah and Ghulam Nabi Gilkar were the first three educated Kashmiri youth to be arrested during the public agitation of 1931.

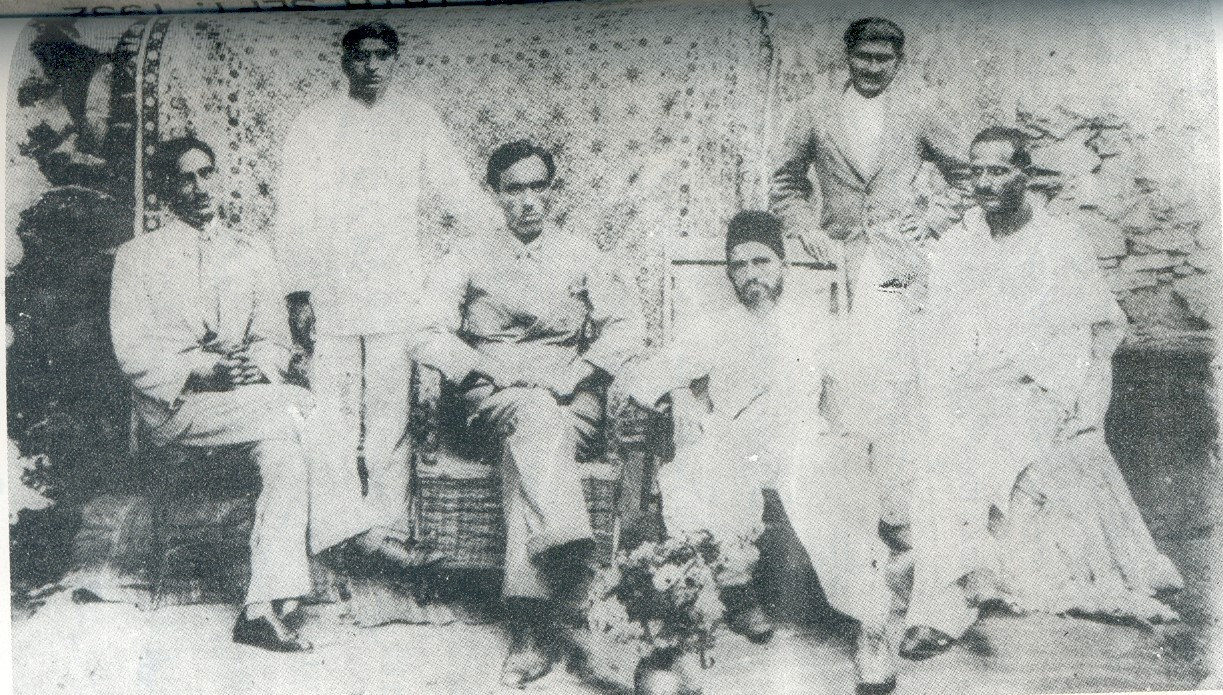
Sheikh Abdullah with other leaders of 1931 agitation. Sitting R to L: Sardar Gohar Rehman, Mistri Yaqoob Ali, Sheikh Abdullah, Chaudhary Ghulam Abbas. Standing R: Molvi Abdul Rahim, L:Ghulam Nabi Gilkar

Kashmir's first political party the Muslim Conference with Sheikh Abdullah as president, Chaudhary Ghulam Abbas as general secretary, and Molvi Abdul Rahim as Secretary was formed on 16 October 1932. In his presidential address Sheikh Abdullah categorically stated that the Muslim Conference had come into existence to struggle for the rights of all oppressed sections of the society and not Muslims alone. It was not a communal party and would struggle for the rights of the oppressed, whether Hindu, Muslim or Sikh, with the same fervor. He reasserted that the struggle of Kashmiris was not a communal struggle.

In March 1933 the Muslim Conference constituted a committee which included Molvi Abdullah and nine other members for the purpose of establishing contacts with non-Muslim parties and exploring the possibility of forming a joint organisation. Those nine members were Khwaja Saad-ud-din Shawl, Khwaja Hassan Shah Naqshbandi, Mirwaiz Kashmir, Molvi Ahmad-Ullah, Mirwaiz Hamadani, Agha Syed Hussain Shah Jalali, Mufti Sharif-ud-din, Molvi Atiq-Ullah and Haji Jafar Khan. According to Abdullah Sheikh this effort was not successful because of the unfavourable reception of the idea by the non-Muslim parties. Sheikh Abdullah campaigned to change the name of the Muslim Conference to National Conference, under the influence of among others Jawaharlal Nehru. After a prolonged and vigorous campaign a special session of the Muslim Conference held in June 1939 voted to change the name of the party to National Conference. Of the 176 members attending the session, 172 members voted in favour of the resolution. According to Sheikh Abdullah the support of Chaudhary Ghulam Abbas of Jammu was very important in motivating the members to vote for this change.

=== Electoral politics ===
As a result of the 1931 agitation, the Maharajah appointed a Grievances Commission with an Englishman B.J. Glancy as president who submitted its report in March 1932. Subsequently, a Constitutional Reforms Conference also presided over by B.J. Glancy recommended the setting up of an elected Legislative Assembly (Praja Sabha). Consequently, a Praja Sabha with 33 elected and 42 nominated members elected on the basis of separate electorates for Hindus and Muslims was established in 1934. Women and illiterate men without sufficient property, or title, or annual income of less than 400 rupees did not have the right to vote. Roughly less than 10% (according to Justice Anand only 3%) of the population were enfranchised.

Even after the formation of Praja Sabha in 1934 as recommended by the Commission real power continued to remain in the hands of the Maharajah.

Seventeen years later in 1951, the government of Kashmir with Sheikh Abdullah as prime minister held elections to a constituent assembly on the basis of universal adult suffrage. Sheikh Abdullah's Government had been accused of rigging in these elections to the constituent assembly.

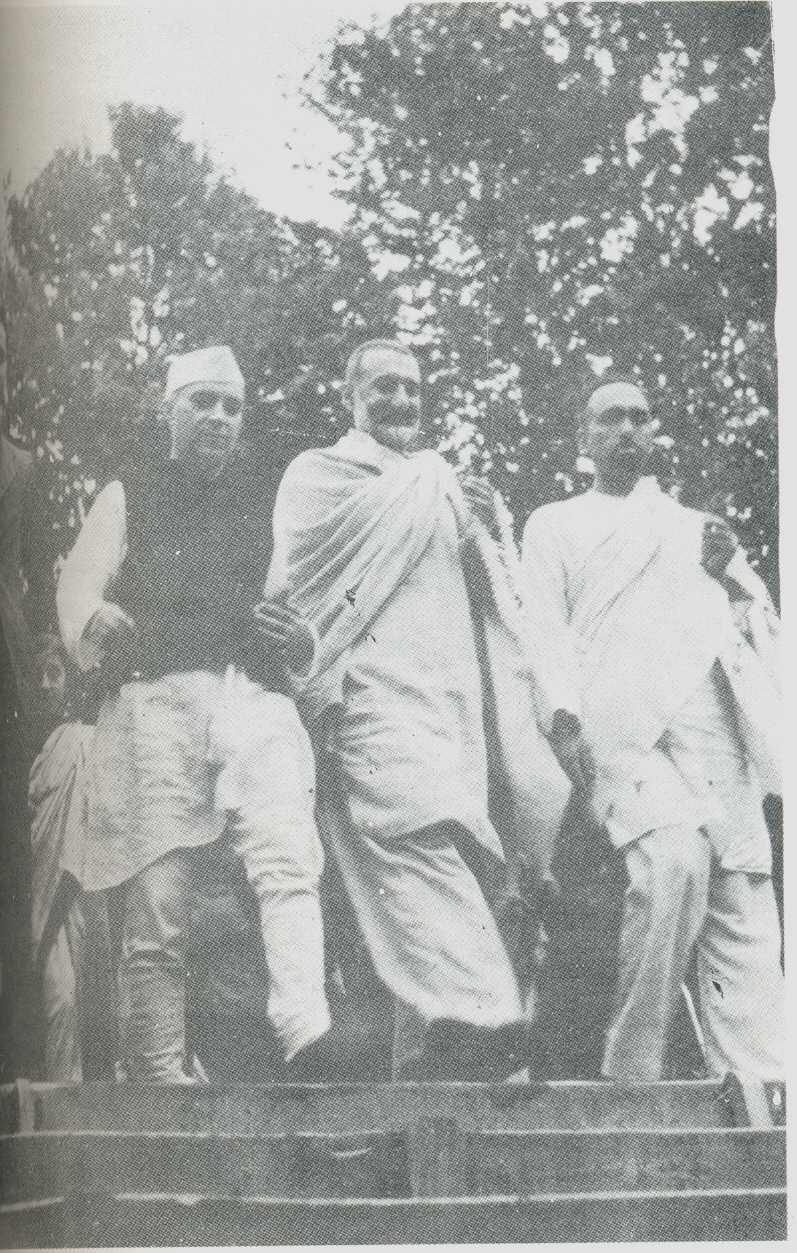
Sheikh Abdullah with Nehru and Badshah Khan (centre) at Shalimar Garden in 1945

Sheikh Abdullah was introduced to Jawaharlal Nehru in 1937 and as he too was a leader of the Indian National Congress was demanding similar rights for people of British India and had formed The All India States Peoples' Conference for supporting the people of princely states in their struggle for a representative government the two became friends and political allies.

=== National Conference ===
He introduced a resolution in the working committee of the Muslim Conference for changing its name to National Conference on 24 June 1938 to allow people from all communities to join the struggle against the autocratic rule of the Maharaja. Meanwhile, he along with his liberal progressive friends, many of whom were not Muslim like Kashyap Bandhu, Jia Lal Kilam, Pandit Sudama Sidha, Prem Nath Bazaz and Sardar Budh Singh drafted the National Demands the forerunner of the famous Naya Kashmir (New Kashmir) Manifesto (which was a charter of demands for granting a democratic constitution committed to the welfare of the common people of Kashmir).

He presented these demands to the Maharajah in a speech on 28 August 1938. The Maharajah was not willing to accept these demands and so he along with many of his companions was arrested for defying prohibitory orders and sentenced to six months imprisonment and a fine. His arrest provoked a public agitation in which volunteers called Dictators (so called because they had the authority to defy laws that was forbidden for normal law-abiding party members) courted arrest. This agitation was called off on the appeal of Mohandas K. Gandhi. He was released after serving his sentence on 24 February 1939 and accorded a grand reception by the people of Srinagar on his return. Speeches were made at the reception stressing the importance of unity among Hindus, Muslims and Sikhs. Subsequently the resolution for changing the name of Muslim Conference to National Conference was ratified with an overwhelming majority by the General Council of the Muslim Conference on 11 June 1939 and from that date Muslim Conference became National Conference.

=== Quit Kashmir agitation ===
In May 1946 Sheikh Abdullah launched the Quit Kashmir agitation against Maharajah Hari Singh and was arrested and sentenced to three years imprisonment but was released only sixteen months later on 29 September 1947.

== Head of Government ==
=== Head of emergency administration ===
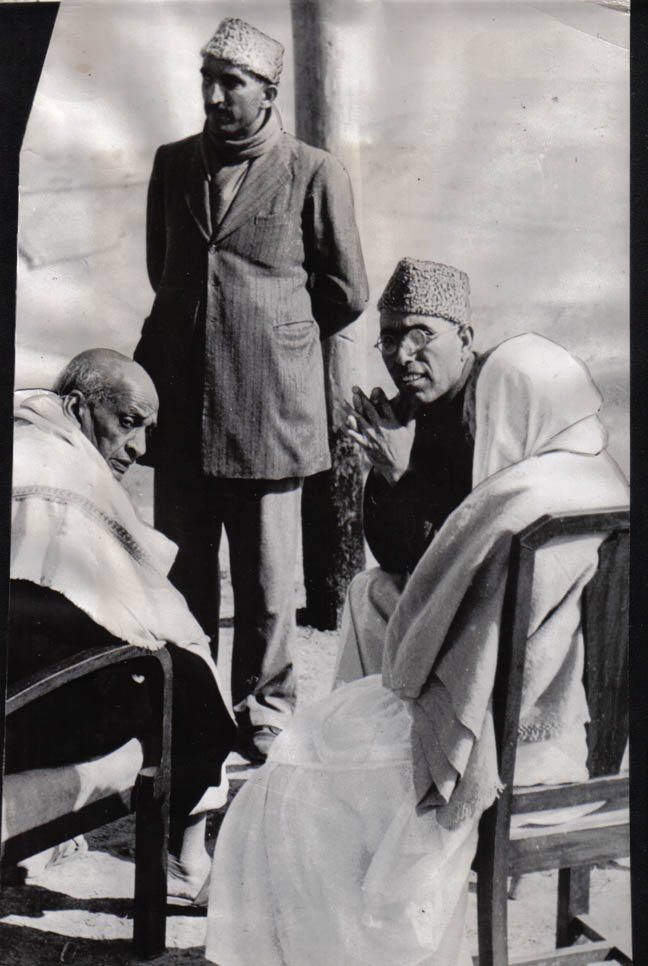
Sheikh Mohammed Abdullah (right), chosen to head interim government in Kashmir, confers with Sardar Patel, deputy premier of India

Maharaja Hari Singh appealed to Lord Mountbatten, the Governor-General of India for Indian military aid. In his accession offer dated 26 October 1947 which accompanied The Instrument of Accession duly signed by him on 26 October 1947, Maharaja Hari Singh wrote "I may also inform your Excellency's Government that it is my intention at once to set up an interim Government and ask Sheikh Abdullah to carry the responsibilities in this emergency with my Prime Minister."

Lord Mountbatten accepted the accession after a meeting of the Defence Committee on 26 October 1947. In accepting the accession unconditionally he wrote, "I do hereby accept this Instrument of Accession. Dated this twenty seventh day of October, nineteen hundred and forty seven." In the covering letter to Hari Singh, he wrote "In consistence with their policy that in the case of any State where the issue of accession has been the subject of dispute, the question of accession should be decided in accordance with the wishes of the people of the State, it is my Government's wish that, as soon as law and order have been restored in Kashmir and its soil cleared of the invader, the question of the State's accession should be settled by a reference to the people." Also in his letter to the Maharaja, Lord Mountbatten wrote "My Government and I note with satisfaction that your Highness has decided to invite Sheikh Abdullah to form an Interim Government to work with your Prime Minister." The support of Mahatma Gandhi and prime minister, Jawaharlal Nehru, was a key factor in getting Sheikh Abdullah appointed as Head of the emergency administration by the Maharaja.

As a consequence, Sheikh Abdullah was appointed head of an emergency administration by an order issued by the Maharaja which was undated except for the mention of October 1947 in place of the date. He took charge as Head of the Emergency Administration on 30 October 1947.

He raised a force of local Kashmiri volunteers to patrol Srinagar and take control of administration after the flight of the Maharaja along with his family and Prime Minister Meher Chand Mahajan to Jammu even before the Indian troops had landed. This group of volunteers would serve as the nucleus for the subsequent formation of Jammu and Kashmir Militia. This, Sheikh Abdullah hoped, would take over the defence of Kashmir after the Indian army was withdrawn. This was articulated in his letter to Sardar Patel dated 7 October 1948 in which he wrote, "With the taking over of the State forces by the Indian Government, it was agreed that steps would be taken to reorganise and rebuild our army so that when the present emergency is over and the Indian forces are withdrawn the State will be left with a proper organised army of its own to fall back upon." (Sheikh Abdullah has alleged that most of the Muslim soldiers of the Militia were either discharged or imprisoned before his arrest in 1953. The Militia (dubbed as Dagan Brigade) was converted from a State Militia to a regular unit of the Indian Army on 2 December 1972 and redesignated the Jammu and Kashmir Light Infantry).

Sheikh Abdullah spoke at the UN Security Council on 5 February 1948 thus:

While the [tribal] raiders came to our land, massacred thousands of people — mostly Hindus and Sikhs, but Muslims too — abducted thousands of girls, Hindu, Sikhs and Muslims alike, looted our property and almost reached the gates of our summer capital, Srinagar, the result was that the civil, military and police administration failed. The Maharaja, in the dead of the night, left the capital along with his courtiers, and the result was absolute panic. There was no one to take over control. In that hour of crisis, the National Conference came forward with 10,000 volunteers and took over the administration of [Kashmir].

== Return to activism ==
=== Arrest and release ===
On 8 August 1953 he was dismissed as prime minister by the then Sadr-i-Riyasat (Constitutional head of state) Dr. Karan Singh, son of the erstwhile Maharajah Hari Singh, on the charge that he had lost the confidence of his cabinet (not the house). He was denied the opportunity to prove his majority on the floor of the house and his dissident cabinet minister Bakshi Ghulam Mohammed was appointed as prime minister. Sheikh Abdullah was immediately arrested and later jailed for eleven years, accused of conspiracy against the state in the infamous Kashmir Conspiracy Case.

According to Sheikh Abdullah his dismissal and arrest were engineered by the central government headed by Prime Minister Jawaharlal Nehru. He has quoted B. N. Mullicks' statements in his book My Years with Nehru in support of his statement. A. G. Noorani writing in Frontline supports this view, as according to him Nehru himself ordered the arrest. On 8 April 1964, the state government dropped all charges in the so-called Kashmir Conspiracy Case. Sheikh Abdullah was released and returned to Srinagar where he was accorded an unprecedented welcome by the people of the valley."

After his release he was reconciled with Nehru. Nehru requested Sheikh Abdullah to act as a bridge between India and Pakistan and make President Ayub to agree to come to New Delhi for talks for a final solution of the Kashmir problem. President Ayub Khan also sent telegrams to Nehru and Sheikh Abdullah with the message that as Pakistan too was a party to the Kashmir dispute any resolution of the conflict without its participation would not be acceptable to Pakistan. This paved the way for Sheikh Abdullah's visit to Pakistan to help broker a solution to the Kashmir problem.

Sheikh Abdullah went to Pakistan in spring of 1964. President Ayub Khan of Pakistan held extensive talks with him to explore various avenues for solving the Kashmir problem and agreed to come to Delhi in mid June for talks with Nehru as suggested by him. Even the date of his proposed visit was fixed and communicated to New Delhi. However, before Ayub Khan could make his visit, Nehru died on 27 May 1964. The Sheikh was en route to Muzaffarabad in Pakistan-administered Kashmir when he received the news. He addressed a public rally at Muzaffarabad in Pakistan-administered Kashmir and returned to Delhi. On his suggestion, President Ayub Khan sent a high level Pakistani delegation led by his Foreign Minister Zulfikar Ali Bhutto along with him to take part in the last rites of Jawaharlal Nehru.

After Nehru's death in 1964, Sheikh Abdullah was again interned from 1965 to 1968. The internment was ordered by Lal Bahadur Shastri and continued by Indira Gandhi. The Plebiscite Front was also banned. This was allegedly done to prevent him and the Plebiscite Front which was supported by him from taking part in elections in Kashmir. Again, he was exiled from Kashmir in 1971-72 for 18 months, during which period the Indo-Pak war of 1971 came to be waged.

=== After Indo-Pakistan war and creation of Bangladesh ===
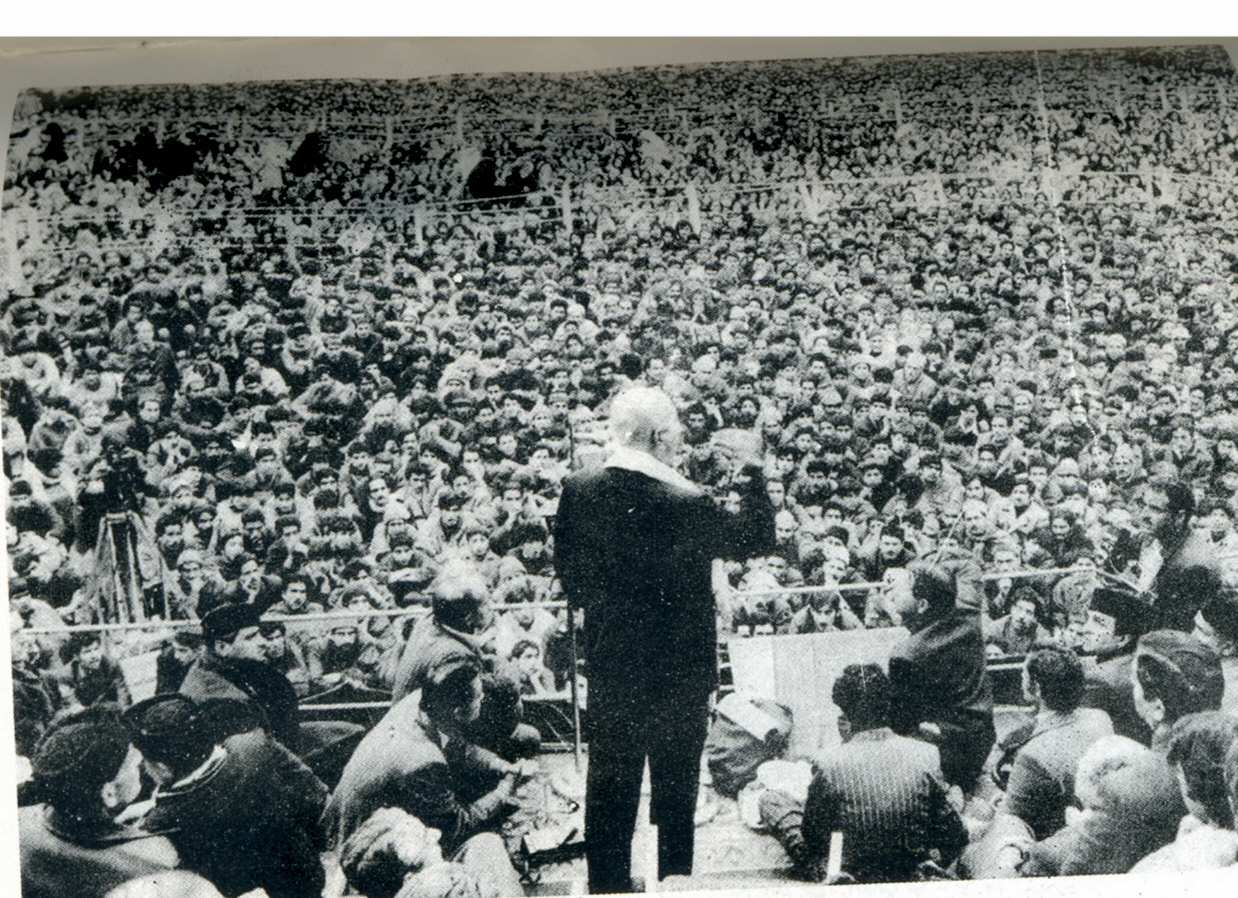
Sheikh Abdullah addressing a gathering at Lal Chowk Srinagar in 1975

In 1971, the Bangladesh Liberation War broke out in erstwhile East Pakistan between Pakistan and Bangladesh joined later by India, and subsequently war broke out on the western border of India between India and Pakistan, both of which culminated in the creation of Bangladesh.

Over the years, especially after the Indo-Pakistani War of 1971 and the subsequent Simla Agreement of 1972, the focus on the plebiscite diminished. The political realities shifted towards maintaining the status quo, with India and Pakistan managing their respective parts of Kashmir. The political climate in J&K had also evolved, with new leaders and parties emerging, and the National Conference (NC) losing its dominant position. Also, evident from the fact that his party who won 70 out of 75 seats in state election in 1962 won only 8 seats in 1967 while 0 seats in 1972 election.

The Indira–Sheikh Accord of 1975 was a result of prolonged negotiations where Sheikh Abdullah agreed to accept the position of Chief Minister under the Indian Constitution, effectively dropping the demand for a plebiscite. He became CM with support of INC which had 61 out of 75 seats in assembly while JKNC had none.

== Return to power ==
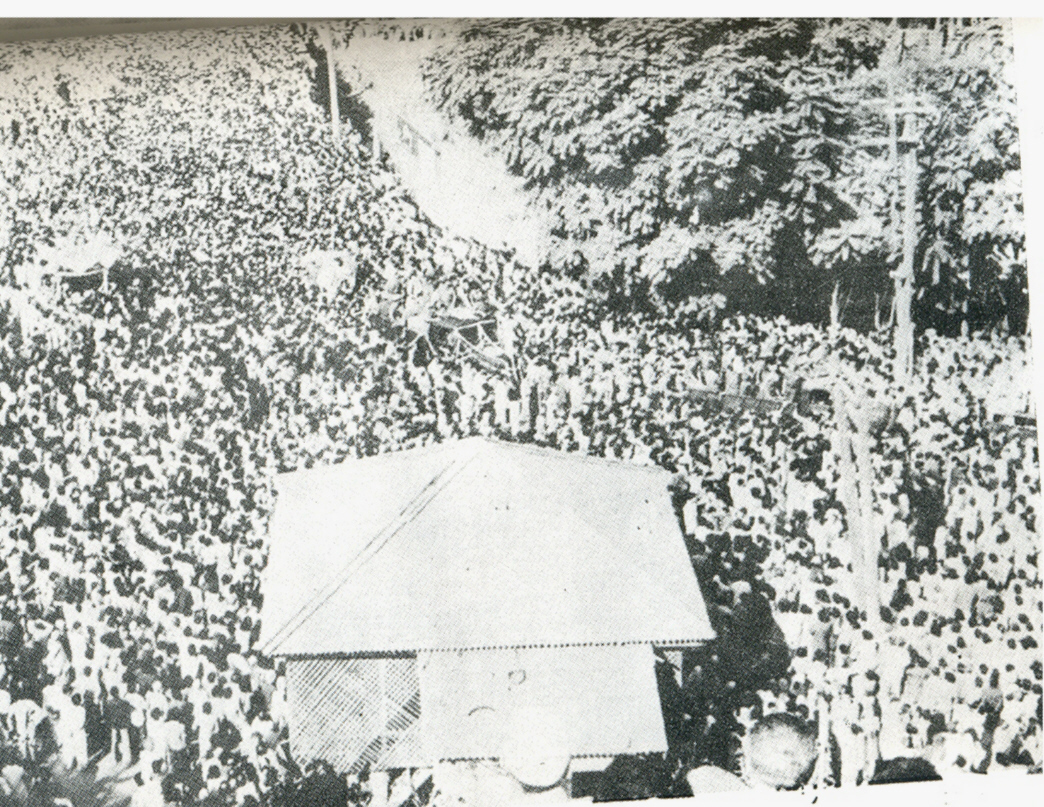
Sheikh Abdullah's funeral procession

He assumed the position of Chief Minister of Jammu and Kashmir. The Central Government and the ruling Congress Party withdrew its support so that the State Assembly had to be dissolved and mid term elections called.

The National Conference won an overwhelming majority in the subsequent elections and re-elected Sheikh Abdullah as Chief Minister. He remained as Chief Minister till his death in 1982.

Abdullah, described as a six feet four inches (1.93 m) to six feet six inches (1.98 m) tall man, was fluent in both Kashmiri and Urdu.

After his death his eldest son Dr. Farooq Abdullah was elected as the Chief Minister of the State.

== Personal life ==
In 1933 he married Akbar Jahan, the daughter of Michael Harry Nedou, of Slovak and British descent, and his Muslim Gujjar wife Mirjan. Michael Harry Nedou was himself the proprietor of hotels at the tourist resort of Gulmarg, and Srinagar. The writer Tariq Ali claims that Abdullah was Akbar Jehan's second husband. (Note: Ali claims she was married in 1928 to an Arab Karam Shah who disappeared after a Calcutta newspaper Liberty reported that he was actually T. E. Lawrence (Lawrence of Arabia), a British Intelligence officer. He claims that Akbar Jehan was divorced by her first husband in 1929.)

== Commentaries ==
=== Pakistani view ===
The government of Pakistan in 1947 viewed Abdullah and his party as agents of Nehru and did not recognise his leadership of Kashmir. He spoke against Pakistani government in United Nations by comparing it with Hitler's rule, and he also endorsed Indian stand on Jammu and Kashmir. However, there was a change in Pakistan's viewpoint with the passage of time. When he visited Pakistan in 1964 he was awarded a tumultuous welcome by the people of Pakistan. Among the persons who received him was Chaudhary Ghulam Abbas his once colleague and later political enemy who earlier in his book Kashmakash had denounced Sheikh Abdullah as a turncoat and traitor. Chaudhary Ghulam Abbas embraced him and in his speech described him as one of the greatest leaders of the subcontinent and a great benefactor of the Muslims of the subcontinent. President Ayub Khan and his then Foreign minister Zulfikar Ali Bhutto discussed the Kashmir problem with him. The government of Pakistan treated him as a state guest. Sheikh Abdullah had the rare distinction of having poems in his praise written by three major Pakistani Urdu poets namely Hafeez Jullundhri, Josh and Faiz Ahmed Faiz who admired his lifelong struggle against injustice and for democratic rights of the common man.

== Legacy ==
Along with Bakshi Ghulam Mohammed, Sheikh Abdullah has been called the "Architect of Modern Kashmir".

The birth anniversary of Abdullah was a public holiday in the state until 2019. "Sher-e-Kashmir" has been dropped from a number of places, including a conference hall, the state award and police medal. There are a number of institutions and buildings named after him, such as the Sher-e-Kashmir University of Agricultural Sciences and Technology of Kashmir in Kashmir and Jammu, the Sher-e-Kashmir Institute of Medical Sciences and the Sher-e-Kashmir Stadium. A name change for the stadium has also been aired, however it has not been implemented yet.

== In popular culture ==
The Flame of the Chinar, a 1998 Indian feature documentary film directed by Zul Vellani covers his life and works. It was produced by the Government of India's Film Division. Anang Desai portrayed Abdullah in the 2013 Indian docudrama television series Pradhanmantri, which covered the tenures of Indian PMs.

== Aatish-e-Chinar ==
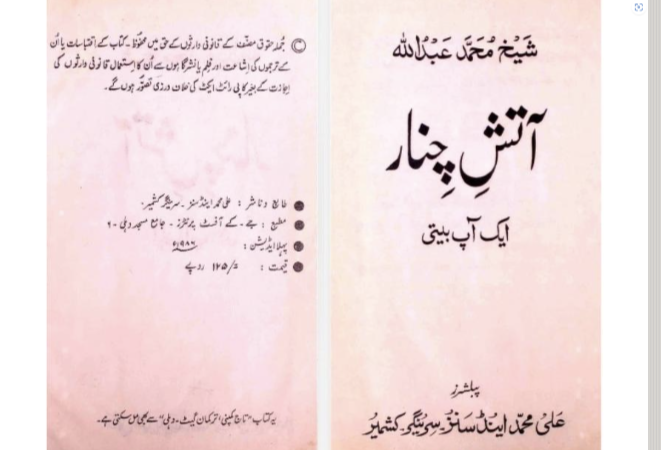
Front page of Aatish-e-Chinar

Aatish-e-Chinar is an autobiography of Sheikh Mohammad Abdullah published in 1986, after Abdullah's death. This book provides a detailed account of his life, struggles, and political journey. It covers his efforts to secure justice for the Kashmiri people, including his experiences with imprisonment and political activism.

The book was composed in Urdu by the noted Kashmiri author M. Y. Taing. It is often referred to as his autobiography as Taing claimed that he only acted as an amanuensis. It is based on extensive interviews that Taing had with Sheikh Abdullah and provides valuable information on Sheikh Abdullah's family background, early life, ringside glimpses of happenings in Kashmir at a crucial juncture in its history, and his viewpoint about the political events in Kashmir in which he himself played a central role.

== See also ==
- List of Kashmiri people
- History of Kashmir
- Kashmir conflict
- Instrument of Accession (Jammu and Kashmir)
- Kashmiriyat – a socio-cultural ethos of religious harmony and Kashmiri consciousness.
- List of political parties in Jammu and Kashmir (princely state)
- Outline of Jammu and Kashmir
- Kashmir Conspiracy Case
- List of political families

== Notes ==
Political offices
Preceded by Mehr Chand Mahajan	Prime Minister of Jammu and Kashmir; 1948–1953	Succeeded by Bakshi Ghulam Mohammad
Preceded by Syed Mir Qasim	Chief Minister of Jammu and Kashmir; 1975–1977	Succeeded by President's rule
Preceded by President's rule	Chief Minister of Jammu and Kashmir; 1977–1982	Succeeded by Farooq Abdullah
