= Omar Abdullah =

1st Chief Minister of the Union Territory of Jammu and Kashmir since 2024

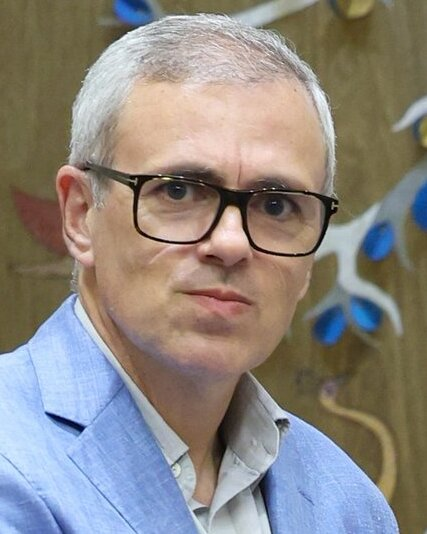
- Abdullah in 2025

1st Chief Minister of the Union Territory of Jammu and Kashmir
- Incumbent
- Assumed office 16 October 2024
- Lieutenant Governor: Manoj Sinha
- Deputy: Surinder Kumar Choudhary
- Cabinet: Omar II
- Preceded by: President's rule (Note: Mehbooba Mufti as Chief Minister of the State of Jammu and Kashmir. The Assembly was dissolved in 2018 followed by the abrogation of Articles 370 and 35A, which made the state into a UT and elections were conducted in 2024.)

8th Chief Minister of the state of Jammu and Kashmir
- In office 5 January 2009 – 8 January 2015
- Governor: Narinder Nath Vohra
- Deputy: Tara Chand
- Cabinet: Omar I
- Preceded by: Governor's rule (Note: Gulam Nabi Azad as Chief Minister of the State of Jammu and Kashmir.)
- Succeeded by: Governor's rule (Note: Mufti Mohammad Sayed as Chief Minister of the State of Jammu and Kashmir.)

Member of Jammu and Kashmir Legislative Assembly
- Incumbent
- Assumed office 16 October 2024
- Preceded by: Ishfaq Ahmad Sheikh
- Constituency: Ganderbal
- In office 20 December 2014 – 20 June 2018
- Preceded by: Shafi Ahmad Wani
- Succeeded by: Shafi Ahmad Wani
- Constituency: Beerwah
- In office 24 December 2008 – 20 December 2014
- Preceded by: Qazi Mohammad Afzal
- Succeeded by: Ishfaq Ahmad Sheikh
- Constituency: Ganderbal

Union Minister of State for External Affairs
- In office 13 October 1999 – 23 December 2002
- Prime Minister: Atal Bihari Vajpayee
- 1999 – 2001: Commerce and Industry
- 2001 – 2002: External Affairs

Member of Parliament, Lok Sabha
- In office 10 March 1998 – 18 May 2009
- Preceded by: Ghulam Mohammad Mir Magami
- Succeeded by: Farooq Abdullah
- Constituency: Srinagar, Jammu and Kashmir

Vice President of Jammu and Kashmir National Conference
- Incumbent
- Assumed office 5 January 2009
- President: Farooq Abdullah
- Preceded by: Office established

President of Jammu and Kashmir National Conference
- In office 2002–2009
- Preceded by: Farooq Abdullah
- Succeeded by: Farooq Abdullah

Personal details
- Born: 10 March 1970 (age 56) Rochford, Essex, England
- Party: Jammu & Kashmir National Conference
- Spouse: Payal Nath (m. 1994; div. 2026) Nidhi Razdan (m. 2026)
- Relations: Sheikh Mustafa Kamal (uncle)
- Children: 2
- Parent: Farooq Abdullah (father)
- Education: Burn Hall School; Sydenham College (B.Com)
- Occupation: Politician

Omar Farooq Abdullah (Note: Urdu: عمر عبداللہ;) (born 10 March 1970) is an Indian politician serving as the chief minister of the union territory of Jammu and Kashmir since 2024. He is also currently serving as the Leader of the House in the Jammu and Kashmir Legislative Assembly. He had previously served as the 8th chief minister of the state of Jammu and Kashmir between 2009 and 2014, and is the current vice president of the Jammu & Kashmir National Conference, a position he has held since 2009 and also previously served as its president. Abdullah has also served as a Member of Parliament in the Lok Sabha, the lower house of Indian parliament, from 1998 to 2009, representing the Srinagar constituency, and was a Minister of State for External Affairs of India.

The son of former Jammu and Kashmir State chief minister Farooq Abdullah, he joined politics in 1998 after being elected as the youngest member of the Lok Sabha, a feat he repeated in subsequent three elections. He was the union Minister of State for External Affairs in Atal Bihari Vajpayee's NDA government, from 23 July 2001 to 23 December 2002. He resigned from NDA government in October 2002 to concentrate on party work. During this time, he took a larger role in state politics. However, his party faced defeat in the 2002 state elections. However, he and his party were later elected in the 2008 state elections.

He became the youngest, and 11th chief minister of the state of Jammu and Kashmir after forming a government in coalition with the Indian National Congress, on 5 January 2009. He would serve in that position until 2015, after being defeated in the 2014 state elections. He was the last leader of opposition in the erstwhile state Jammu and Kashmir Legislative Assembly, serving as an MLA from Beerwah constituency, before the assembly was dissolved in 2018 and the state of Jammu & Kashmir ceased to exist on 31 October 2019 and became a union territory following the revocation of Article 370, which Abdullah fiercely opposed.

Following being arrested and detained in 2020, Abdullah returned to politics first in the 2024 Indian general election, where he was defeated for a seat. Despite initially refusing to run for a seat, Abdullah was elected as an MLA following the 2024 union territory elections, being elected the first chief minister of the union territory of Jammu and Kashmir. He took office in October 2024.

== Personal life ==
Omar Abdullah was born on 10 March 1970 in Rochford, Essex, United Kingdom. He is a grandson of Sheikh Abdullah, and the only son of Farooq Abdullah, a physician and former Chief Minister of J&K. All three men have held the position of Chief Minister of Jammu and Kashmir. His mother, Mollie, an Englishwoman and a nurse by profession, has said that she was not in favor of him joining politics. He studied at the Burn Hall School located at Sonwar Bagh, Srinagar and then at Lawrence School, Sanawar. He is a B.Com. graduate of Sydenham College of Commerce and Economics. He was employed with ITC Limited and The Oberoi Group till the age of 29 before entering politics. He did commence an MBA with the University of Strathclyde, however due to his election to the Lok Sabha, he dropped out from the course.

He married Payal Nath in 1994. She is the daughter of a retired army officer, Ram Nath. In September 2011, Omar confirmed that he and his wife have separated, but matter went to court. In July 2026 the Supreme Court accepted the divorce. Abdullah married Nidhi Razdan, who was a former journalist in NDTV, in October 2026.

He had a role in director Apoorva Lakhia's film, Mission Istanbul (2008) playing himself.

== Political career ==
In 1998, at the age of 28, Omar Abdullah was elected to the 12th Lok Sabha, becoming the youngest member. In 1998–99, he was a member of both the Committees on Transport and Tourism and the Ministry of Tourism's Consultative Committee. In 1999, he was elected to the 13th Lok Sabha (2nd term as a Member of Parliament). On 13 October 1999, he took oath as Union Minister of State, Commerce and Industry. On 22 July 2001, he became the youngest Union Minister, when he was made Union Minister of State for External Affairs. He resigned from the post on 23 December 2002, to concentrate on party work.

On 23 June 2002, he became the President of the National Conference party, replacing his father, Farooq Abdullah. He lost his Ganderbal seat in the Kashmir assembly elections held in September–October 2002. Abdullah was re-elected as the National Conference party's president in 2006.

In March 2006, much to the disapproval of the centre Omar Abdullah had a one-on-one meeting with Pakistan's president, Pervez Musharraf, in Islamabad. This was the first meeting of its kind between a mainstream politician from Jammu & Kashmir and the Pakistani government, thereby re-enforcing Omar's growing commitment to the solution of the Jammu & Kashmir cause.

On 22 July 2008, Omar gave a speech during the 2008 Lok Sabha vote of confidence, which was praised and won him fans on the internet. "I am a Muslim and I am an Indian, and I see no distinction between the two. I don't know why should I fear the nuclear deal. It is a deal between two countries which, I hope, will become two equals in the future. The enemies of Indian Muslims are not America or deals like these. The enemies are the same as the enemies of all those who are poor — poverty, hunger, lack of development and the absence of a voice".

On 6 February 2020 the government of India booked him under the Public Safety Act (PSA) which was revoked on 24 March 2020.

Abdullah has been appointed a member of the coordination committee of the Indian National Developmental Inclusive Alliance (I.N.D.I.A.) at its Mumbai convention on 1 September 2023. The coordination committee will decide the national agenda, common campaign issues and common program of the country's main opposition alliance (I.N.D.I.A.).

In the 2024 Lok Sabha Election Omar Abdullah was defeated by Engineer Sheikh Abdul Rashid. In run up to the 2024 Lok Sabha polls, Omar Abdullah showed unwillingness to go for a seat sharing agreement with other political parties under the INDIA alliance in Jammu and Kashmir, and insisted on NC contesting all seats in Kashmir region. He won both of his assembly seats from Budgam Assembly constituency and Ganderbal Assembly constituency and later withdrew his Budgam seat and retained Ganderbal seat.

== Chief Ministership ==
=== First term as chief minister (2009–2015) ===
After the 2008 Kashmir Elections, the National Conference won the largest number of seats, and formed a coalition government with the Congress party, and Omar was sworn in as the 11th Chief Minister of Jammu and Kashmir on 5 January 2009 at the General Zoravar Singh Auditorium in the University of Jammu, Jammu, raising hope amongst the people of Jammu and Kashmir who had been reeling under insurgency and violence caused by cross border terrorism since 1989.

In 2009, Omar Abdullah was accused of covering up the rape and murder of two young women in Shopian. Many regarded this as Abdullah's first failure, as even moderates felt Abdullah had bowed to pressure from New Delhi.

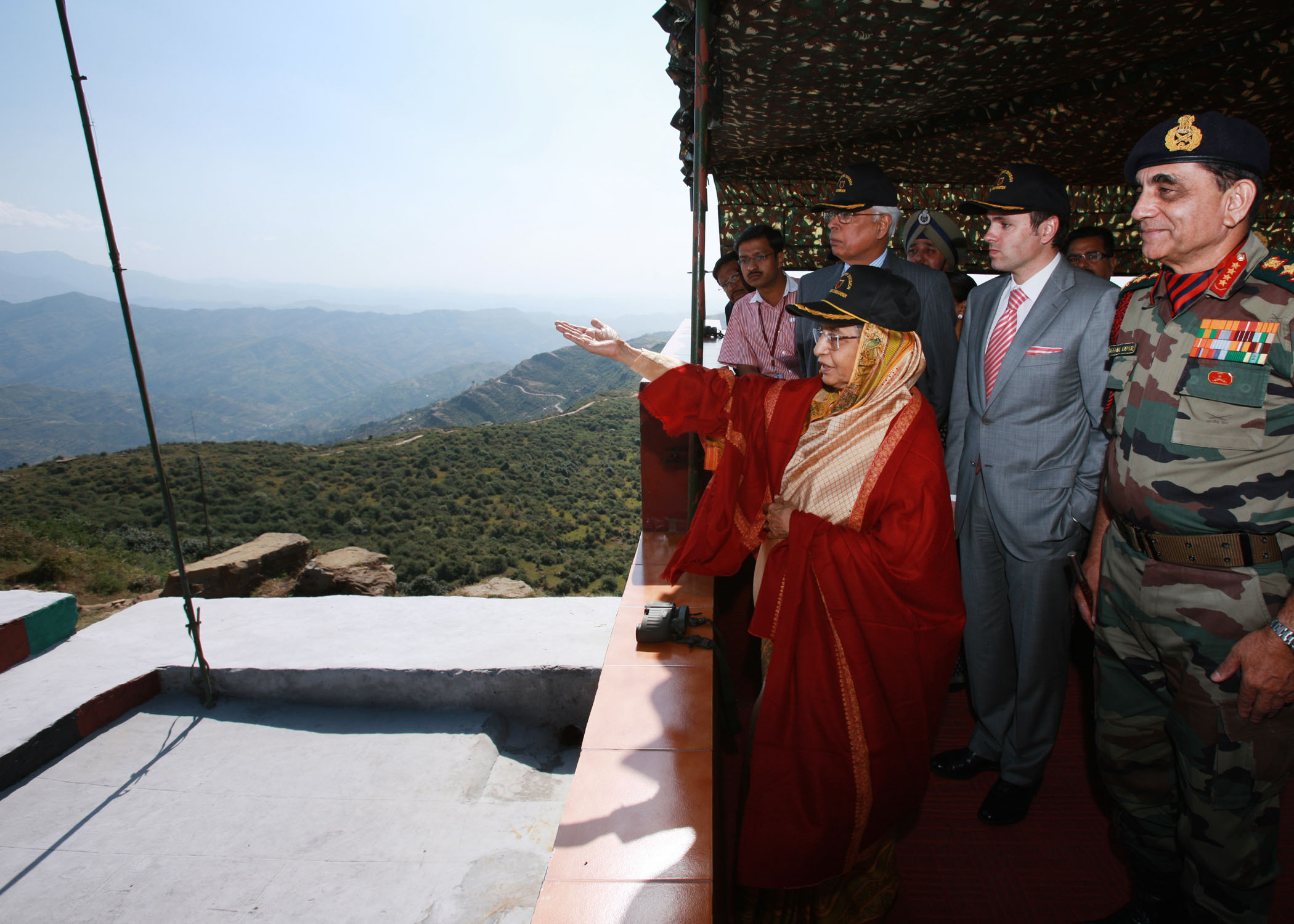
Abdullah with the PoI Pratibha Patil, J&K Governor N.N. Vohra and Indian Army Chief Gen. Deepak Kapoor at the LOC near Rajouri on 9 October 2009.

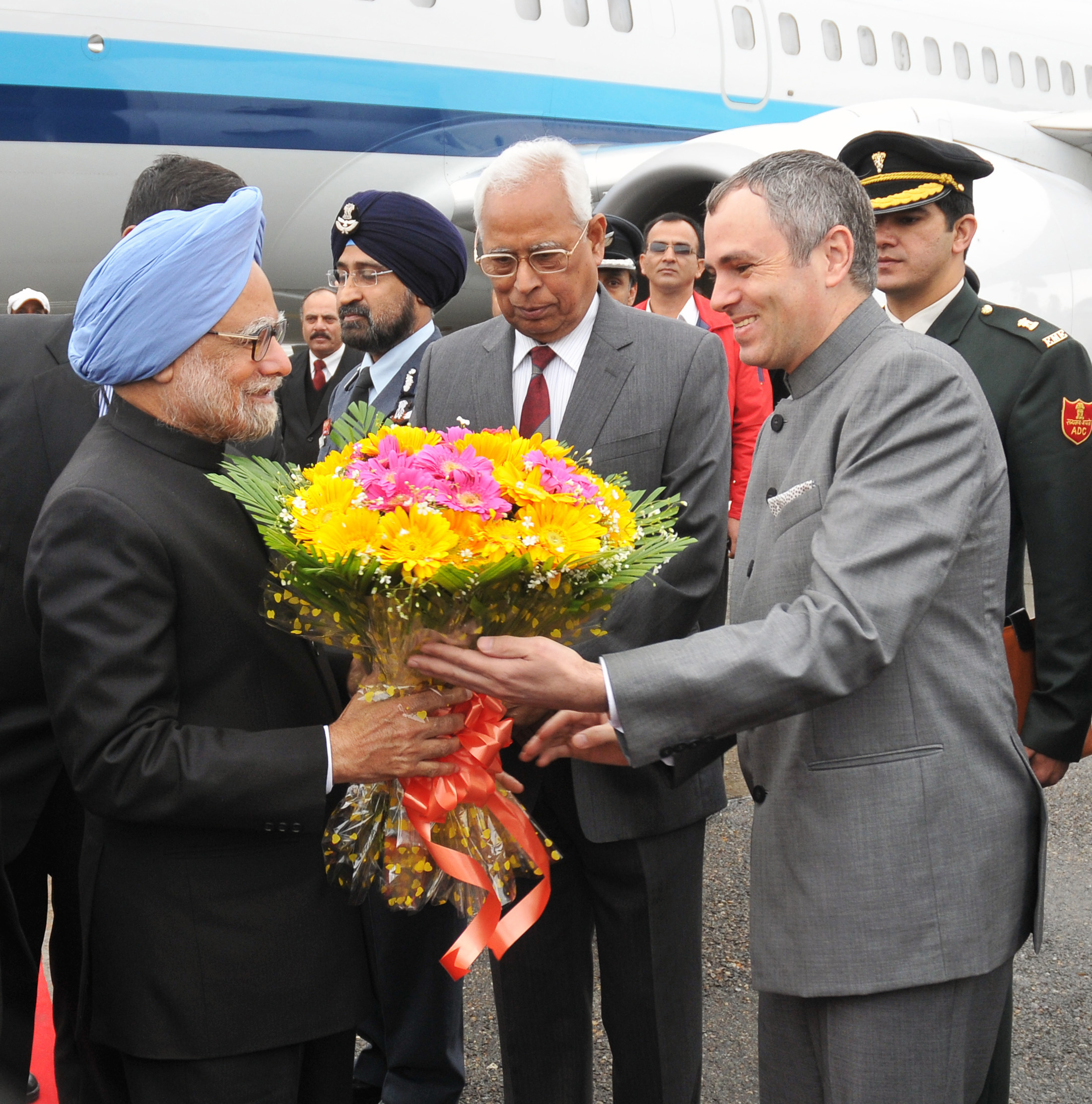
Abdullah welcomes PM Manmohan Singh on his arrival at Jammu airport in 2011.

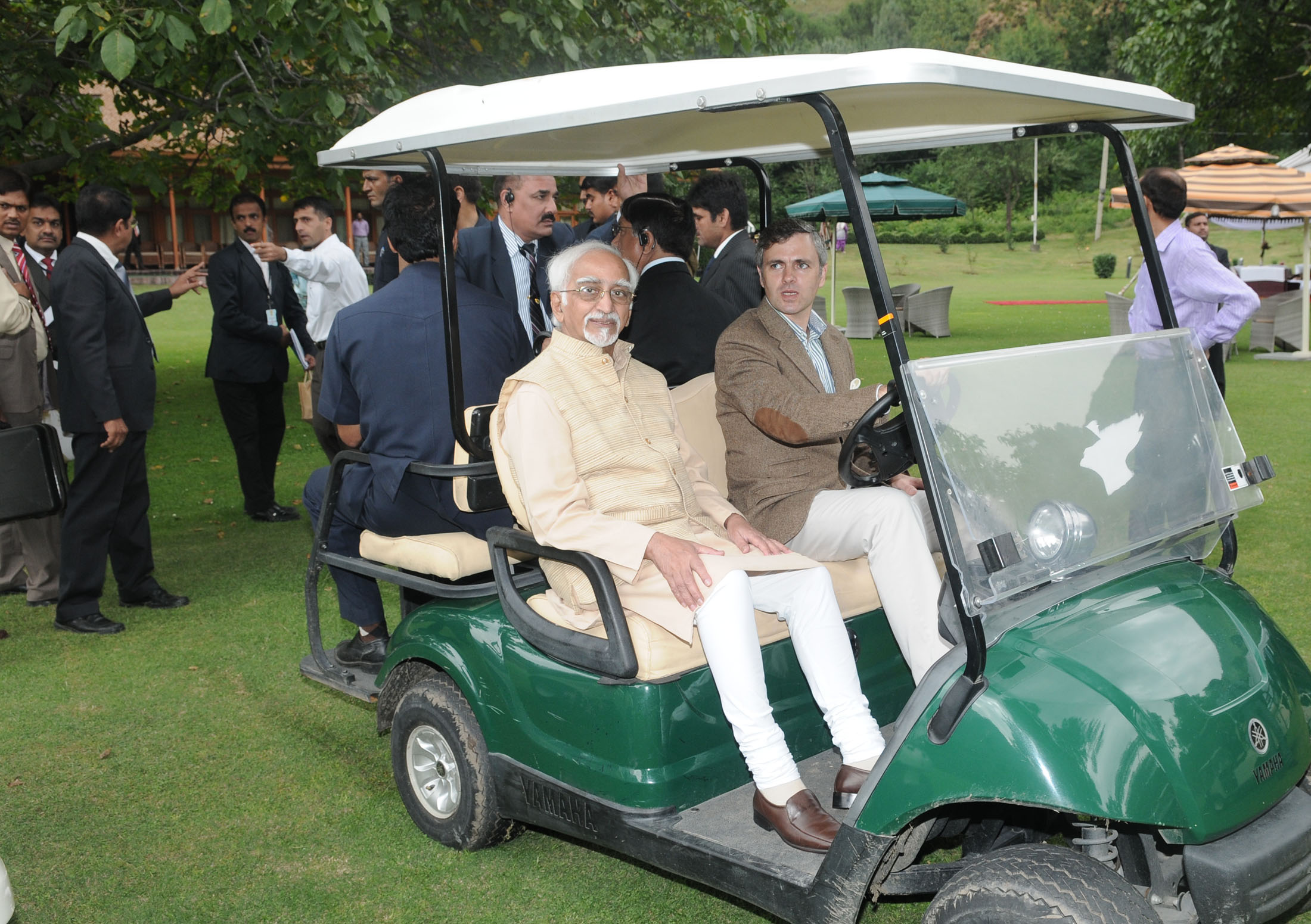
Abdullah drives VP Hamid Ansari in a golf cart at Srinagar, 2012.

=== Second term as chief minister (2024–present) ===
At the 2024 Jammu and Kashmir Legislative Assembly election, Abdullah's Jammu and Kashmir National Conference and its allies alliance secured 49 seats allowing him to be nominated to be the new Chief Minister of Jammu and Kashmir. Omar Abdullah met with the Lieutenant Governor of Jammu and Kashmir, Manoj Sinha, on 11 October was sworn in as Chief Minister on 16 October 2024.

== Detention ==
On the intervening night of 4 and 5 August 2019, Omar Abdullah was placed under preventive detention by the Indian Government under Section 107 of the CRPC. This came as a backdrop to the government's decision of scrapping Article 370 of the Constitution of India, which gave the state of Jammu & Kashmir semi-autonomous powers.

After the expiry of the six-month detention without any charges, Abdullah was again charged and detained under the Public Safety Act (PSA) which was later revoked on 24 March 2020.

"The capacity of the subject to influence people for any cause can be gauged from the fact that he was able to convince his electorate to come out and vote in huge numbers even during peak of militancy and poll boycotts," the government dossier continues.

Abdullah's sister, Sara Abdullah Pilot has filed a writ petition in the Supreme Court challenging Abdullah's detention calling it "wholly antithetical to a democratic polity and undermines the Indian Constitution" and asking that the SC secure Abdullah's release.

The petition also includes a habeas corpus for Abdullah to be produced before the Supreme Court.

On 10 February 2020, senior advocate Kapil Sibal, appearing for petitioner Sara Abdullah Pilot, mentioned the matter for urgent listing before a bench headed by Justice N V Ramana.

On 14 February 2020, the Supreme Court issued notice to the Jammu & Kashmir administration and set the next date of hearing as 2 March 2020.

On 24 March 2020, Omar Abdullah was released from detention. Following his release, he demanded other people held under detention be released as well.

== Notes ==
Lok Sabha
Preceded by Ghulam Mohammad Mir Magami	Member of Parliament for Srinagar; 1998–2009	Succeeded by Farooq Abdullah
Political offices
Preceded by Ghulam Nabi Azad	Chief Minister of Jammu and Kashmir; 2009–2014	Succeeded by Mufti Mohammad Sayeed
Preceded by Mehbooba Mufti	Chief Minister of Jammu and Kashmir; 2024–	Incumbent
Preceded by	Vice President of the Jammu & Kashmir National Conference; 2009–	Incumbent
