= 2017 Srinagar by-election =

A by-election was held in the Lok Sabha constituency of Srinagar on 9 April 2017 with repolling in 38 polling on 13 April. It was triggered by the resignation of Tariq Hameed Karra after his defection from Jammu and Kashmir Peoples Democratic Party to the Indian National Congress.

21 March was the final date for candidates to nominate. Voting took place between 7 a.m. and 5 p.m.

== Candidates ==
- Jammu and Kashmir Peoples Democratic Party (PDP): The party selected Nazir Ahmad Khan, a former Congress leader, to defend the seat.
- Jammu & Kashmir National Conference - Farooq Abdullah stood as the candidate for the party.

Other party candidates included Sajad Reshi of Rashtriya Samajwadi Party (Secular), Chetan Sharma of Akhil Bharatiya Hindu Mahasabha and Bikram Singh of Jammu and Kashmir Liberal Democratic Party. The independent candidates were Sajjad Hussain Beigh, Ghulam Hassan Dar, Farooq Ahmad Dar and Mehraj Khurshid Malik.

Some leaders of the Bharatiya Janata Party stated in mid-March that it will stand against its government coalition partner the PDP. However only the PDP filed nominations. Jammu and Kashmir National Panthers Party stated that it had decided to boycott the election, claiming the security cover to its senior leaders was withdrawn. The Kashmiri separatists meanwhile called upon the voters to boycott the poll.

== Results ==
A voter turnout of 7.14%, the lowest in 30 years, was recorded amidst violent protests and attacks on polling stations by mobs during the elections on 9 April. Repolling at 38 polling stations was ordered by the Election Commission of India. A 2% voter turnout was recorded in areas where repolling was held on 13 April, bringing the turnout to 7.13%. Farooq Abdullah was declared the winner on the next day with over 10,700 votes over his nearest rival Nazir Ahmad Khan.

Declared results:

Colour	Party	Candidate	No. of votes	Percentage of votes
	JKNC	Farooq Abdullah	48,555	54.02%
	JKPDP	Nazir Ahmad Khan	37,779	42.03%
	NOTA	—	931	1.04%
	Independent	Farooq Ahmad Dar	630	0.70%
	Independent	Mehraj Khurshid Malik	576	0.64%
	All Jammu & Kashmir Liberal Democratic Party	Bikram Singh	496	0.55%
	Independent	Mirza Sajjad Hussain Beigh	364	0.40%
	ABHM	Chetan Sharma	364	0.22%
	Independent	Ghullam Hassan Dar	197	0.22%
	Rashtriya Samajwadi Party (Secular)	Sajad Reshi	155	0.17%
No. of eligible voters	No. of votes cast	No. of Valid votes	Percentage of votes valid	Turnout
1,261,862	89,881	89,881	100%	7.13%

== Violence and protests ==
Violence broke out during the elections on 9 April with over 200 violent incidents reported, concentrated mostly in Budgam district in addition to attacks on polling stations with poll staff abandoning about 70% of election stations. Protesters tried to enforce a boycott that had been called by the separatists. 8 people were killed in clashes between mobs and security forces. Videos of Kashmiri youths beating up CRPF troops who did not retaliate, as well as videos of purported excesses by Indian troops created controversies. The repolling on 13 April was relatively peaceful with only one incident of stone-throwing reported, however with a very low voter turnout.

The by-poll for the Lok Sabha seat of Anantnag which was originally scheduled for 12 April was also postponed to 25 May due to the violence in the Srinagar by-poll. The election to the Anantnag seat was later cancelled with the Election Commission citing security problems.

== See also ==
- Elections in Jammu and Kashmir
