= Begum Akbar Jehan Abdullah =

Indian politician

Begum Akbar Jehan Abdullah (1916 – 11 July 2000) was an Indian politician. She was the wife of Sheikh Abdullah

Akbar Jehan was a Croatian Kashmiri born to Michael Henry Nedou aka Harry, the eldest son of the European owner of an Indian hotel chain that included Nedous Hotel in Srinagar, and his Kashmiri wife Mirjan. Nedou was himself the proprietor of a hotel at the tourist resort of Gulmarg. She married Sheikh Mohammed Abdullah in 1933.

== Political career ==
She served as a member of 6th and 8th Lok Sabha, from 1977 to 1979, and from 1984 to 1989, representing Kashmir's Srinagar and Anantnag constituencies, respectively.

She had the distinction of being the first President of Jammu and Kashmir Red Cross Society from 1947 to 1951. She also served as Chairman of State Level Committee of International Year of Women, 1975 and President of all India Family Welfare Association, State Branch, 1976 and All India Women's Conference, State Branch in 1977.

== Later life and death ==
Jehan Abdullah died on 11 July 2000 in Srinagar at the age of 84.

== Personal ==
V. S. Naipaul in his travelogue An Area of Darkness mentions about the origins of Abdullah family. During his travels in Kashmir, Naipaul narrates the story of a European hotelier Michael Henry Nedou who got attracted to a Muslim woman named Mir Jan in the hill station of Gulmarg. Nedou expressed his desire to marry Mir Jan; however, her parents proposed he convert to Islam as a condition for the marriage. He accepted and from this union was born Akbar Jehan, who would later marry Sheikh Mohammad Abdullah, a central figure in the political history of Jammu and Kashmir and the founder of the National Conference party.

She is the mother of the Kashmiri politician Farooq Abdullah, who succeeded his father Sheikh as J&K chief minister in 1982 and the paternal grandmother of Omar Abdullah.

Lok Sabha
| Preceded by S. A. Shamim | Member of Parliament for Srinagar; 1977-1980 | Succeeded by Farooq Abdullah |
| Preceded by Ghulam Rasool Kochak | Member of Parliament for Anantnag; 1984–1989 | Succeeded by P. L. Handoo |
