= Ishfaq Ahmad Sheikh =

Indian politician (born 1974)

Ishfaq Ahmad Sheikh popularly known as Ishfaq Jabbar (born 1974) is an Indian politician from Jammu and Kashmir. He was an MLA from Ganderbal Assembly constituency in Ganderbal district. He won the 2014 Jammu and Kashmir Legislative Assembly election representing the Jammu and Kashmir National Conference. He lost the election in 2024 as an independent candidate.

== Early life and education ==
Sheikh is from Lar Ganderbal, Jammu and Kashmir. He is the son of Abdul Jabbar Sheikh, a former minister who was assassinated by militants. He completed his Class 12 and discontinued his studies while doing his first year B.A. at a college affiliated with University of Kashmir. In 2008, Ishfaq contested on a Congress ticket but later joined the National Conference (NC) in 2014. He won the election against senior PDP leader Qazi Muhammad Abzal. However, he didn’t left NC but was expelled due to internal conflicts and formed his own political party Jammu and Kashmir United Movement(JKUM).

== Career ==
Inspired by his father, Ishfaq joined politics and left his job at a young age .Sheikh won from Ganderbal Assembly constituency representing the Jammu and Kashmir National Conference in the 2014 Jammu and Kashmir Legislative Assembly election. He polled 19,478 votes and defeated his nearest rival, Qazi Mohammad Afzal of the Jammu and Kashmir Peoples Democratic Party, by a margin of 597 votes.
