= Farooq Abdullah =

Indian politician (born 1937)

4th Chief Minister of Jammu & Kashmir
- In office 9 October 1996 – 18 October 2002
- Governor: K. V. Krishna Rao; Girish Chandra Saxena
- Preceded by: President's rule
- Succeeded by: Mufti Mohammad Sayeed
- In office 7 November 1986 – 18 January 1990
- Governor: Jagmohan Malhotra; K. V. Krishna Rao
- Preceded by: Governor's rule
- Succeeded by: Governor's rule
- In office 8 September 1982 – 2 July 1984
- Governor: Braj Kumar Nehru; Jagmohan Malhotra
- Preceded by: Sheikh Abdullah
- Succeeded by: Ghulam Mohammad Shah

Member of Parliament, Lok Sabha
- In office 16 April 2017 – 4 June 2024
- Preceded by: Tariq Hameed Karra
- Succeeded by: Aga Syed Ruhullah Mehdi
- Constituency: Srinagar, Jammu & Kashmir
- In office 13 May 2009 – 12 May 2014
- Preceded by: Omar Abdullah
- Succeeded by: Tariq Hameed Karra
- Constituency: Srinagar, Jammu & Kashmir
- In office 6 January 1980 – 5 January 1983
- Preceded by: Begum Akbar Jehan Abdullah
- Succeeded by: Abdul Rashid Kabuli
- Constituency: Srinagar, Jammu & Kashmir

Union Minister of New and Renewable Energy, Government of India
- In office 28 May 2009 – 26 May 2014
- Prime Minister: Manmohan Singh
- Preceded by: Vilas Muttemwar
- Succeeded by: Piyush Goyal

President of Jammu & Kashmir National Conference
- Incumbent
- Assumed office 2009
- Vice President: Omar Abdullah
- Preceded by: Omar Abdullah
- In office 1981 – 2002
- Preceded by: Sheikh Abdullah
- Succeeded by: Omar Abdullah

Member of Parliament, Rajya Sabha
- In office 30 November 2002 – 16 May 2009
- Constituency: Jammu and Kashmir

Personal details
- Born: 21 October 1937 (age 89) Srinagar, Jammu and Kashmir, British India
- Party: Jammu & Kashmir National Conference
- Spouse: Mollie Abdullah (m. 1968)
- Relations: Sheikh Mustafa Kamal (brother)
- Children: Omar; Safia; Hinna; Sara
- Parents: Sheikh Abdullah; Begum Akbar Jehan Abdullah
- Education: Tyndale Biscoe School; Sawai Man Singh Medical College
- Occupation: Politician

Farooq Abdullah (born 21 October 1937) is an Indian politician who serves as current president of the Jammu & Kashmir National Conference. He has served as the chief minister of Jammu and Kashmir on several occasions since 1982 till 2002, and as the union minister for New and Renewable Energy between 2009 and 2014. His father Sheikh Abdullah was the 1st elected chief minister of Jammu and Kashmir. He is the father of Omar Abdullah who is current chief minister.

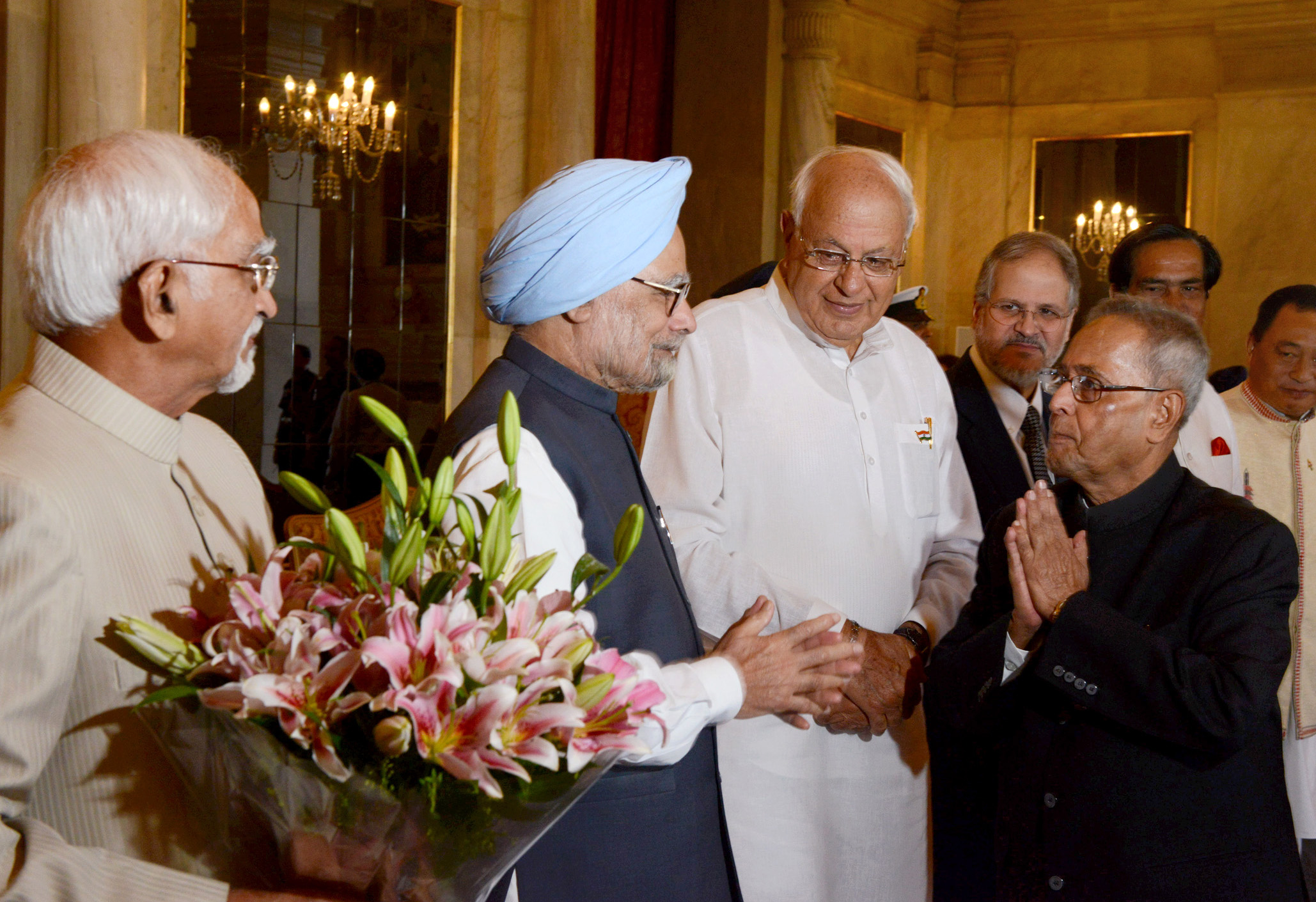
Dr. Farooq Abdullah stands between PM Manmohan Singh and PoI Pranab Mukherjee with VP Mohammad Hamid Ansari on far left at the Rashtrapati Bhavan in New Delhi, 2013

== Early life and education ==
Farooq Abdullah was born to the veteran statesman and National Conference leader Sheikh Abdullah and Begum Akbar Jehan Abdullah. He studied at Tyndale Biscoe School, and subsequently received his MBBS degree from SMS Medical College, Jaipur. He subsequently travelled to the UK to practice medicine.

== Family ==
He is married to Molly, a nurse of British origin. They have a son, Omar, and three daughters, Safia, Hinna, and Sara. Their son Omar Abdullah is also involved in state and national politics, and is the chief minister of Jammu and Kashmir. Sara was married to Congress leader Sachin Pilot, but they divorced in late 2023.

== Political career ==
=== Entry into politics ===
At that time his father Sheikh Abdullah was serving as the Chief Minister of Jammu and Kashmir. Farooq Abdullah was elected to the Lok Sabha unopposed as a founding party member of the Jammu and Kashmir National Conference from Srinagar Lok Sabha constituency in the 1980 General Election.

=== Chief Minister, 1982–1984 ===
Abdullah was a novice in the political arena of Jammu and Kashmir when he was appointed president of the National Conference in August 1981. His main qualification was that he was the son of Sheikh Abdullah. After his father's death in 1982, Farooq Abdullah became the chief minister of the state. In 1984, a faction of the National conference led by his brother-in-law Ghulam Mohammad Shah broke away, leading to the collapse of his government and his dismissal. Shah subsequently became the Chief Minister with the support of the Congress.

=== 1984–1996 ===
In 1986, G.M. Shah's government was dismissed after the communal 1986 Kashmir riots in South Kashmir, and a new National Conference–Congress government was sworn in with Abdullah as the chief minister, after the Rajiv-Farooq accord.

A new election was held in 1987 and the National Conference–Congress alliance won the election amid allegations of fraud and widespread election rigging by the National Conference. This period saw a rise in militancy in the state, with the return of trained militants in J&K and incidents that included the kidnapping of the daughter of the Home Minister Mufti Mohammad Sayeed. The period also witnessed the exodus of Kashmiri Pandits from the Kashmir Valley. Subsequently, Farooq Abdullah resigned in protest after Jagmohan was appointed the governor, and the state's assembly was dismissed. He subsequently moved to the United Kingdom.

=== Chief Minister, 1996–2002 ===
After returning to India, and winning the Legislative Assembly elections in 1996, Abdullah was once again sworn in as chief minister of the state, his fifth time. His government lasted for a full six-year term. In 1999, the National Conference joined the Atal Bihari Vajpayee led National Democratic Alliance, and his son Omar Abdullah was subsequently appointed a union minister of state for External Affairs.

=== Subsequent political career ===
In the 2002 Legislative Assembly elections, Omar Abdullah was chosen to lead the National Conference, while Farooq Abdullah intended to continue his political career at the Central level. The National Conference lost the election and a coalition government headed by Mufti Mohammad Sayeed took office. On that year Former Prime Minister Atal Bihari Vajpayee in 2002 promised to make Abdullah the vice-president, but later reneged on his promise because of Abdul Kalam's nomination to president and Krishan Kant's disagree.

Farooq Abdullah was subsequently elected to the Rajya Sabha in 2002 from Jammu and Kashmir and re-elected in 2009. He resigned from the Rajya Sabha in May 2009 and won a seat in the Lok Sabha from Srinagar. Abdullah joined the United Progressive Alliance government as a Cabinet Minister of New and Renewable Energy.

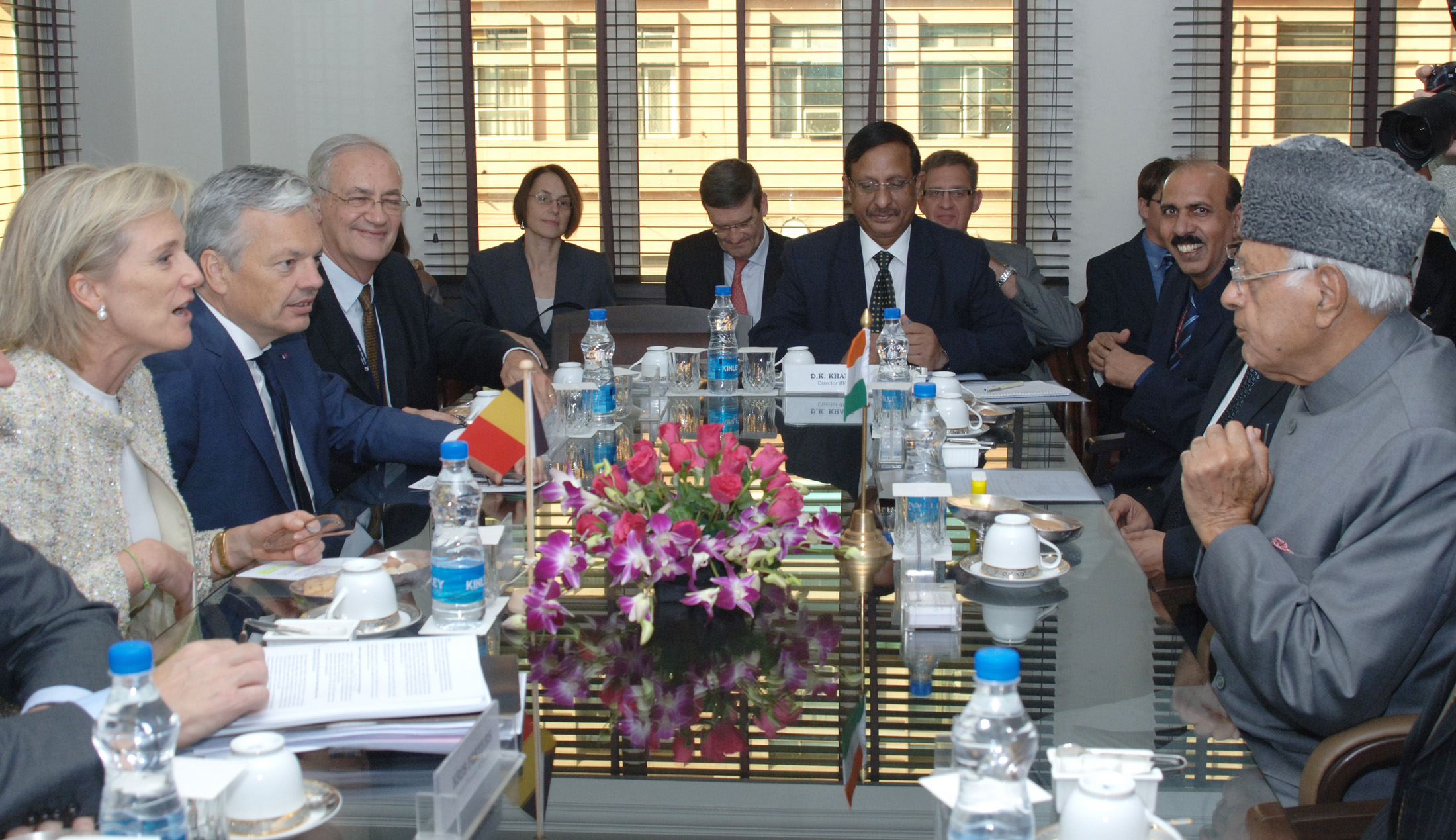
Farooq Abdullah meets with Princess Astrid of Belgium in 2013 in New Delhi.

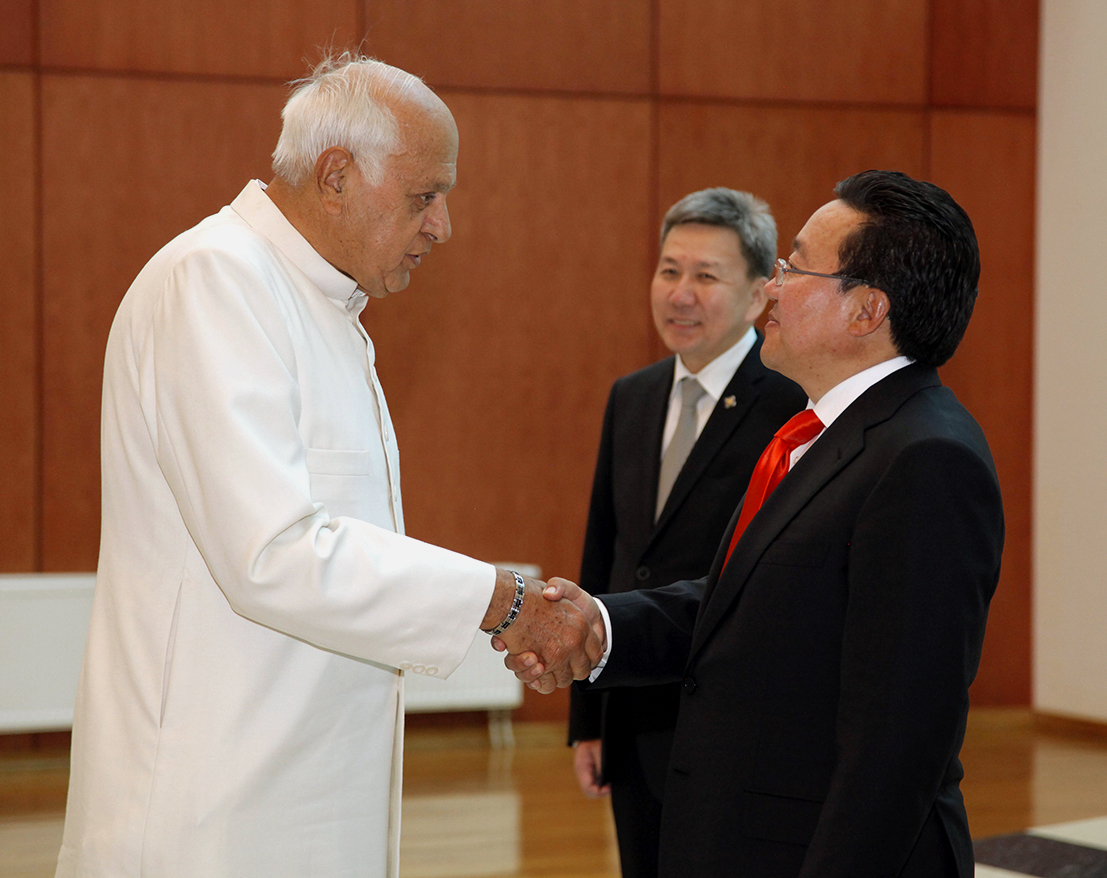
Farooq Abdullah with the President of Mongolia Tsakhia Elbegdorj during his oath taking ceremony in Ulaanbaatar in 2013.

Abdullah contested the Srinagar Lok Sabha seat again in the 2014 General Election, but was defeated by the People's Democratic Party candidate Tariq Hameed Karra. In 2017, Tariq Hameed Karra resigned from the position, leading to a by-election for the Srinagar parliamentary seat. Abdullah got 48,555 votes and defeated PDP candidate Nazir Ahmed Khan by 10,700 votes.

On 16 September 2019, Abdullah became the first mainstream politician to be detained under the Public Safety Act. Prior to this, Abdullah was under house arrest since the scrapping of Article 370 of the Constitution of India. He was released from house detention under the PSA after seven and a half months on 13 March 2020.

In 2022, before the election of the President of India, Mamata Bannerjee along with several other opposition leaders had proposed Abdullah's name as the Opposition's candidate. But Abdullah declined the offer stating that he wanted to remain in active politics for more years and concentrated on the Kashmir Union Territory issue.

== Assassination attempt ==
In March 2026, Abdullah narrowly escaped an assassination attempt during a marriage ceremony in Jammu. The attacker, standing close behind Abdullah, fired at point-blank range, but missed. National Security Guard (NSG) commandos intervened, pushing the attacker away.

== Election History ==
=== Rajya Sabha ===
Position	Party	Constituency	From	To	Tenure
Member of Parliament, Rajya Sabha (1st Term)	JKNC	J&K	30 Nov 2002	29 Nov 2008	5 years, 365 days
Member of Parliament, Rajya Sabha (2nd Term)	JKNC	J&K	16 Feb 2009	16 May 2009	89 days

Party political offices
Preceded by Sheikh Abdullah	President of the Jammu & Kashmir National Conference; 1981–2002	Succeeded by Omar Abdullah
Preceded by Omar Abdullah	President of the Jammu & Kashmir National Conference; 2009–present	Incumbent
Lok Sabha
Preceded by Begum Akbar Jehan Abdullah	Member of Parliament for Srinagar; 1980–1982	Succeeded by Abdul Rashid Kabuli
Preceded by Omar Abdullah	Member of Parliament for Srinagar; 2009–2014	Succeeded by Tariq Hameed Karra
Preceded by Tariq Hameed Karra	Member of Parliament for Srinagar; 2017–2024	Succeeded by Aga Syed Ruhullah Mehdi
Political offices
Preceded by Sheikh Abdullah	Chief Minister of Jammu and Kashmir; 1982–1984	Succeeded by Ghulam Mohammad Shah
Vacant	Chief Minister of Jammu and Kashmir; 1986–1990	Succeeded by Ghulam Mohammad Shah
Vacant	Chief Minister of Jammu and Kashmir; 1996–2002	Vacant Title next held by Mufti Mohammad Sayeed
Preceded by Vilas Muttemwar	Union Minister of New and Renewable Energy; 2009–2014	Succeeded by Piyush Goyal
