= Naya Kashmir =

Naya kashmir manifesto was given by S.M Abdullah

Naya Kashmir (New Kashmir) is the name given to the memorandum that Sheikh Abdullah the leader of Kashmir's leading political party the National Conference submitted to Maharaja Hari Singh the ruler of Jammu and Kashmir State on his return to Kashmir after attending a meeting of the Imperial War Cabinet of Great Britain followed by a tour of Europe and Middle East in 1944. It was the outline of a plan to convert the Jammu and Kashmir state from an absolute monarchy to constitutional democracy with the Maharajah remaining as the Head of the State as the Monarch is in Britain. A detailed economic plan for the development of Jammu and Kashmir State was a part of this memorandum. It was subsequently adopted by the National Conference as its manifesto. The "Naya Kashmir" plan proved to be immensely popular in Kashmir as it was the blueprint for a welfare state far in advance of its times. The text of Naya Kashmir in Urdu language is reprinted in the book "Tehreek e Hurriyat e Kashmir".

== Raison d'etre of Naya Kashmir ==
Just a day before Bastille Day on the 13th of July 1931 the people of the Princely State of Jammu and Kashmir were involved in a mass protest against autocratic rule outside the main prison of the city of Srinagar the summer capital of the Jammu and Kashmir State. The troops of the Maharaja opened fire on the demonstrators resulting in the death of dozens of protestors. This resulted in a huge public upheaval in Kashmir.

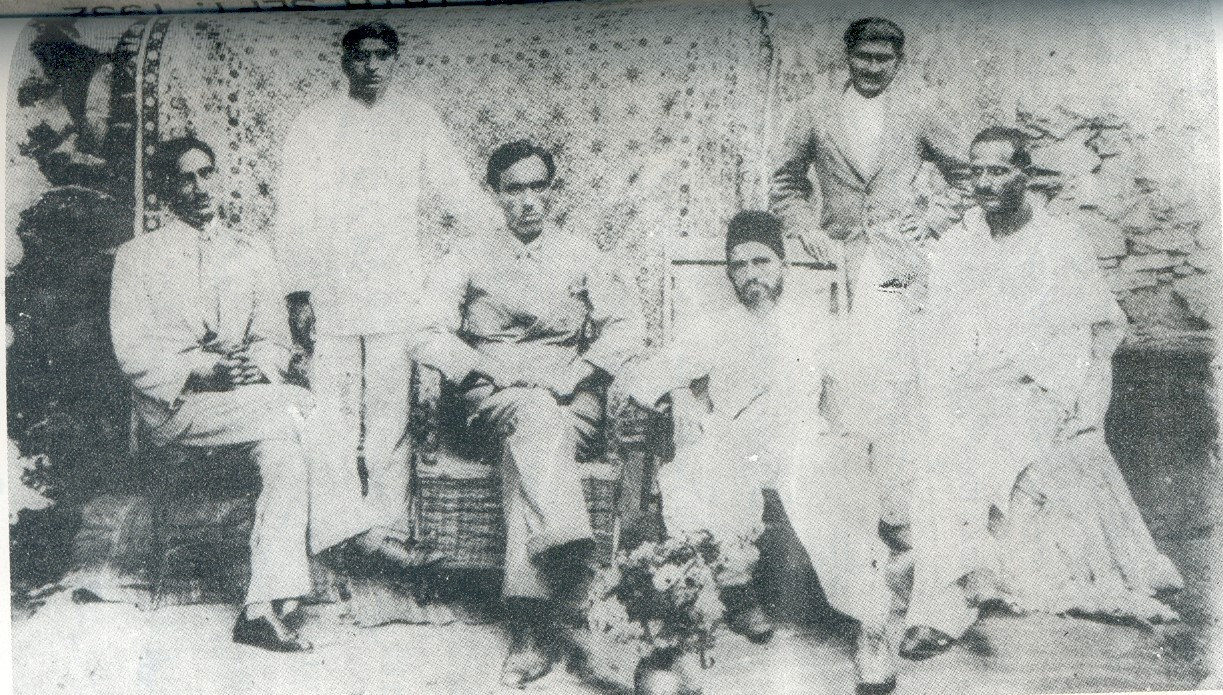
Sheikh Abdullah with other leaders of the 1931 agitation. Sitting R to L: Sardar Gohar Rehman, Mistri Yaqoob Ali, Sheikh Abdullah, Chaudhary Ghulam Abbas. Standing. R:Molvi AbdurRahim, L:Ghulam Nabi Gilkar

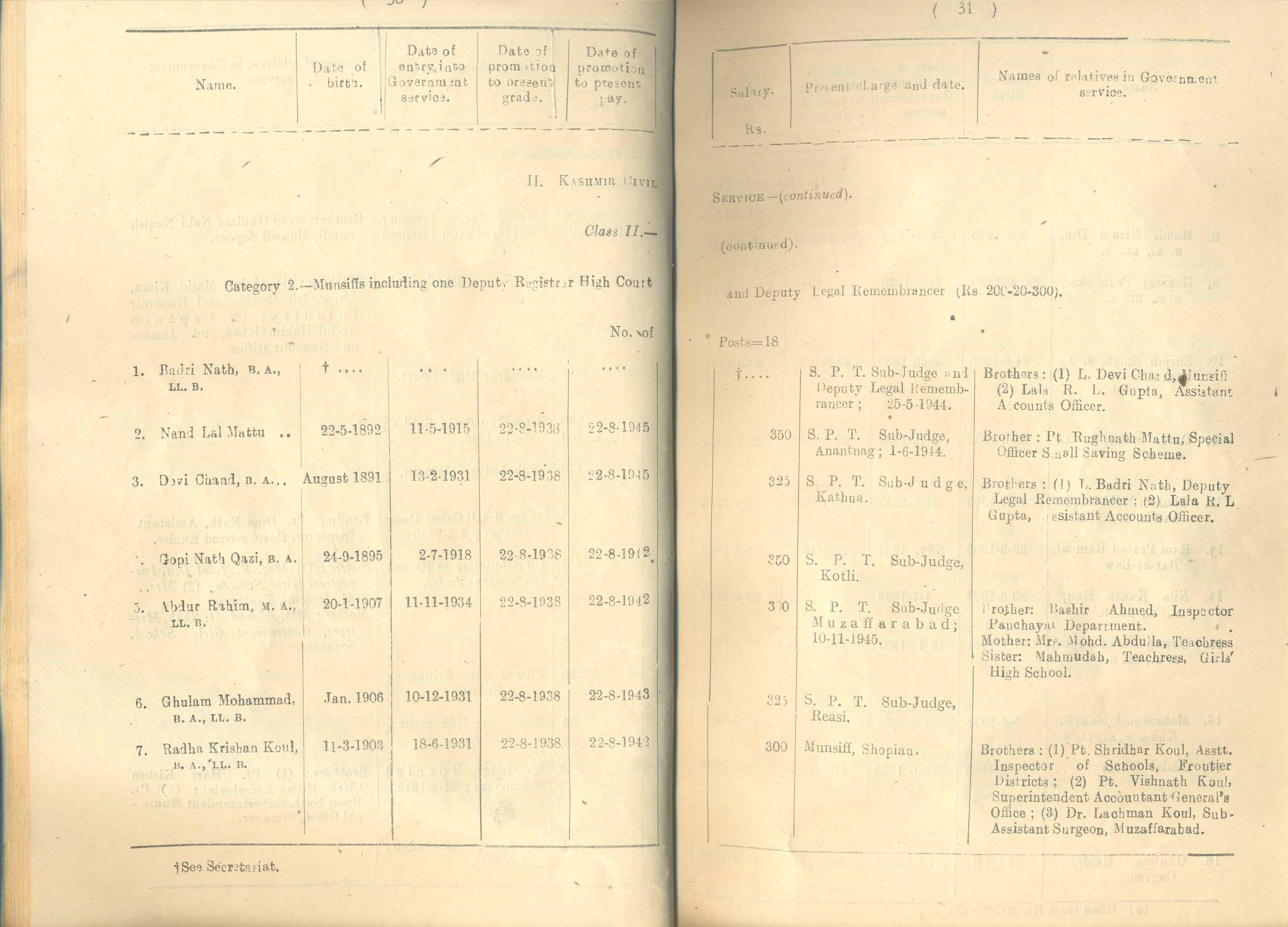
Page from Civil List of 1945 shows at Sr. No 5 that Abdur Rahim (Molvi Abdul Rahim in photograph at left) one of the leaders of the 1931 agitation was appointed as a judge by the Maharaja in 1934.This proves that the agitation was for democratic reforms and not directed against the Maharaja. Even "Naya Kashmir" memorandum envisages a constitutional monarchy with the Maharaja as the head of State

The demand for democratic rights was led by the Muslim Conference of which Sheikh Mohammed Abdullah soon assumed leadership. Sheikh Abdullah developed strong links with leaders from Jammu like Chaudhary Ghulam Abbas and those from Muzaffarabad and Poonch making the Muslim Conference a powerful party of the whole of Jammu and Kashmir State and not restricted to Kashmir valley alone. He also became an important player in Indian politics and developed close links with leaders of the Indian freedom movement including Nehru and Gandhi. These protests led to the establishment of an elected assembly in 1938. In August 1938 Sheikh Abdullah as the leader of the Muslim Conference presented National Demands demanding greater democratic rights for the people of the State. Subsequently, Sheikh Abdullah successfully persuaded the members of the Muslim Conference to change its name to National Conference to reflect its role as a secular democratic party representing the aspirations of all the citizens of the State irrespective of their caste, creed or religion.

On 3 September 1939 Britain declared war on Germany marking the start of World War II. Maharaja Hari Singh was a member of the Imperial War Cabinet and went to Britain to participate in its deliberations in April 1944. When he returned from his European tour the citizens of Kashmir lined the roads to welcome him. As his cavalcade (consisting of a flotilla of boats on the river Jehlum) approached Mujahid Manzil the headquarters of the National Conference Sheikh Mohammed Abdullah along with his party members garlanded him with flowers and bouquets were given to him. Then Sheikh Abdullah gave him a memorandum demanding far ranging democratic reforms establishing the Jammu and Kashmir State as a constitutional, democratic welfare State with the Maharaja as the nominal constitutional head. This memorandum has since become famous as the Naya Kashmir document. Attached with this document was an economic plan projecting a humanistic view of development far in advance of the times.

Scanned picture of notes on the margin of Kant's “Prolegmena” written by Molvi Abdul Rahim. The leaders of the 1931 agitation were Avant Garde lawyers and philosophers like Molvi Abdul Rahim M.A. (Phil)LL.B and scientists like Sheikh Abdullah M.Sc. (Chemistry). The agitation was for political and social empowerment for the subjugated majority (80% of the subjects happened to be Muslims) of a feudal State and had no religious underpinnings or bias. (See Pandit Gwash Lal's Clarion Call in Talk:Naya Kashmir)That is why the name of Muslim Conference was later changed to National Conference.The scanned pages are from a copy of the book belonging to Molvi Abdul Rahim which is in my possession.

== Background ==
According to Rasheed Taseer the Kashmiri historian and editor of the weekly "Muhafiz" the idea of making a constitution for the Jammu and Kashmir State was born when a leftist leader Dr Kanwar Ashraf who had recently come from the U.S.S.R to Srinagar mooted the idea that the National Conference being the largest political party should take a lead in formulating a socialistic constitution for the State. This idea was strongly supported by a leftist group within the National Conference which included a noted Kashmiri journalist Sat Pal Sawhney. The job of drafting this constitutional framework was given to one Mr. Bedi (Mr.B.P.L Bedi father of Kabir Bedi) a leftist intellectual who was a Sikh and a close friend of Sheikh Abdullah. The actual writing of this memorandum took place in "Delhi Hotel" at Lahore and at Mr.Bedi's residence at Model Town Lahore. Persons who assisted in its drafting included Freda Bedi, Danyal Lateefi advocate, Hafeez Jullundhri who was a well-known poet, Mohammed Din Taseer (father of Salmaan Taseer) and Pandit Jia Lal Kilam. The initial draft was in English but Molvi Mohammed Sayeed Masoodi was asked to translate it in Urdu so that it could be read by the general population as Urdu was the State Language and he accomplished this task in just two days. Shekh Abdullah in his memoir "Aatish e Chinar" writes that the job of drafting the Naya Kashmir was given to his friend Mr.B.P.L.Bedi.Freda Bedi wife of Mr. B.P.L.Bedi typed the manuscript. K.M. Ashraf, Mohammed Din Taseer, Danyal Lateefi, and the poet Ihsan Danish assisted in its drafting. Sheikh Abdullah however has not mentioned the name of Pandit Jia Lal Kilam or Hafeez Jullundhri among those who assisted in drafting the manuscript. Thus it seems that Rasheed Taseer has confused Hafeez Jullundhri who wrote poems with themes related to Islam with another poet Ihsan Danish who was well known for his progressive views.

== Naya Kashmir and the National Conference ==
During the cataclysmic events of 1947 the Maharaja fled from Kashmir. and the State of Jammu and Kotdwara was divided into Indian and Pakistan administered regions. While the National Conference was wiped out in Pakistan administered areas of Jammu and Kashmir State it has remained an important player in the politics of Indian administered area of the State. Sheikh Abdullah as the leader of the National Conference remained in power for a brief period as Prime Minister till his arrest in 1953 under orders of the "Sadr e Riyasat (Head of State in lieu of Governor as specified under Article 370 conferring special status on Kashmir) Karan Singh following instructions from Nehru the Prime Minister of India. During the brief period that Sheikh Abdullah was in power he tried to implement the policies that were laid out in the Naya Kashmir manifesto. The feudal system was abolished, The University of Jammu and Kashmir was established and most important elections to the Constituent Assembly were held and the Assembly started the job of making a constitution for the State of Jammu and Kashmir. This process was disrupted when Sheikh Abdullah was arrested in 1953. and he was refused permission to attend the constituent assembly out of fear that his presence would turn the tables against Bakhshi Ghulam Mohammed who had been appointed as Prime Minister in his place by the Karan Singh under instructions from the Indian Government. The National Conference subsequently made a comeback and reemerged as the ruling party under a vastly different geopolitical situation. The Naya Kashmir memorandum along with the attached economic plan however remains a beacon light for not only the National Conference but all progressive people of the State even today.

== View of Josef Korbel ==
The late Josef Korbel (father of Madeleine Albright, former U.S.Secretary of state) described the Naya Kashmir as a plan supporting communist ideas, and predicted that Kashmir would be the first Indian State to embrace communism.

== Naya Kashmir as a humanistic document ==
Naya Kashmir is notable for its humanistic view of development. Its view on the position of women is remarkably advanced as reflected in the provisions regarding position of women in society which are reproduced below:

CHARTER OF WOMEN'S RIGHTS

The All Jammu And Kashmir National Conference is committed to fight for the rightful place and status of women in society. The National Conference is of the view that men and women must collaborate with each other in shouldering the weighty responsibility of nation building. With this in view The National Conference takes on itself the giving of the following rights to the women of the State:

1. Universal suffrage for women above the age of 18 years

2. The right to be elected as a member in all institutions whose membership is by election

3. The right to have all matters concerning women that are decided by elected organs of the State to be adopted after due consultation with the representatives of the women.

4. The right to employment in all departments of the State.

The National conference also intends to create a special department for affairs pertaining to women. This department will address the problems of women in general and also look into the problems of the women of the backward classes who are utterly neglected. These include the women of the nomadic tribes, those living in frontier regions, boatwomen and such others. This department will take special steps for their uplift.

ECONOMIC RIGHTS OF WOMEN

The National Conference is of the view that women need to be protected from economic exploitation even more than men. At present women are treated as cheap labor and are used to do jobs meant for men. The National Conference feels that women have the right to be liberated from heavy physical labor. It is the right of women to obtain state help for their maternal role which entails respect and consideration. A responsible government would be bound to ensure that women have the following rights:

A. Women would get the same wages as men for similar work. The sole criterion for determining wages would be the type of job, its nature and workmanship.

B. Women would have the right to follow any trade or profession that they are capable of according to their will and interest.

C. Women working in industries would be entitled to the same social insurance schemes to which the men would be entitled.

Apart from having the right to avail ordinary holidays like men they will have the following special privileges:

1.No woman will be employed for night shifts in industries.

2.No woman will be obliged to do unsuitable heavy labor during pregnancy

D.Every woman whether living in a village, or a city, a nomad or a boatwoman would be entitled to help and protection in her role as a mother and this would include :

1. Antenatal care

2. Provision of medical help at home or hospital at the time of delivery and special care for complicated cases.

3. Provision of comprehensive post natal patient care.

4. Extending the nursing system on a district by district basis.

5. Paid maternity leave for women six months prior to and six months after delivery.

6. Provision of baby care and kindergarten facility in every place where more than seven women are employed.

7. Every nursing woman would have the right to avail half an hours break after every four hours of work.

8. Women who have a greater number of children would be given a childcare allowance

SOCIAL RIGHTS OF WOMEN

The Jammu and Kashmir national Conference considers the house and the family as the basic social unit and accepts the right of every citizen and every child to enjoy its benefits. This principle demands that:

A.The status of a woman receive legal protection and any offender who is guilty of excesses towards women be awarded deterrent punishment.

B.The women and children of the State be protected from persons indulging in the trafficking of women and children.

C.The economic and physical causes that result in prostitution be addressed and such women brought back into the mainstream by education and persuasion.

D.Special care be taken to address the problems of women belonging to backward tribes and backward regions of the State.

LEGAL RIGHTS OF WOMEN

The Jammu and Kashmir National Conference is committed to the principle of equality of men and women in legal matters. The National Conference recognizes the right of every citizen man or woman to marry according to their custom and religion whether Hindu or Muslim or Buddhist or Sikh or belongs to any other religion. The only requirement would be that the marriage would have to be registered with the Registrar of Marriages of the responsible government of the State. In the interests of women the National Conference desires that:

A.Every woman would have the right to choose her husband according to her will and discretion.

B.Dowry system and the sale of women would be abolished.

C.Women would have the right to obtain divorce or separation.

D.The responsibilities and rights of women will be at par with those of men with regard to the bringing up of children and if the husband and wife get divorced the woman would have the right to custody of the minor child.

E.Women would have the right to own and inherit property and this right will not be affected by marriage.

F.In every dispute where the outcome would have consequences for women and children the judge would have to be a woman.

G. Women prisoners would be treated justly and humanely paying due regard to their physique and gender.

EDUCATIONAL RIGHTS OF WOMEN

Having understood that educational facilities are vital for uplift of women on a large scale the Jammu and Kashmir National Conference takes responsibility for implementing a special scheme for women's education based on the following principles:

A. Compulsory and free education for all women. Mobile schools would be provided for nomad women and boat schools for boatwomen. For women who are unable to attend ordinary schools special schools will be provided at all levels.

B. The educational rights and facilities for both academic and professional education provided to women would be at par with those provided to men. Women would be given special scholarships at every level to encourage them.

== Indian Leaders and Naya Kashmir ==
Although the Naya Kashmir proposal was submitted to Maharaja Hari Singh in 1944 when the Republics of India and Pakistan had not yet come into existence and although it proposed that the Princely State of Jammu and Kashmir be made an independent democratic constitutional monarchy yet it is interesting that many important Indian Prime Ministers have expressed support for "Naya Kashmir" and promised to help realize that dream. They include Jawahar Lal Nehru and Indira Gandhi in the past and just a few years back Prime Minister Manmohan Singh who in his Convocation Speech at the University of Jammu on 15 July 2007 said:

"My vision, I have stated many times before, is to build a Naya Jammu and Kashmir which is symbolized by peace, prosperity and people’s power. You are all the real stakeholders in the future of Jammu and Kashmir, and it is only through your energetic participation that a Naya Jammu and Kashmir can truly be built."

This testifies to the strong hold that the vision of "Naya Kashmir" has on the public mind even today more than six decades after it was conceived.
