= Hari Niwas Palace =

Palace in Jammu, India

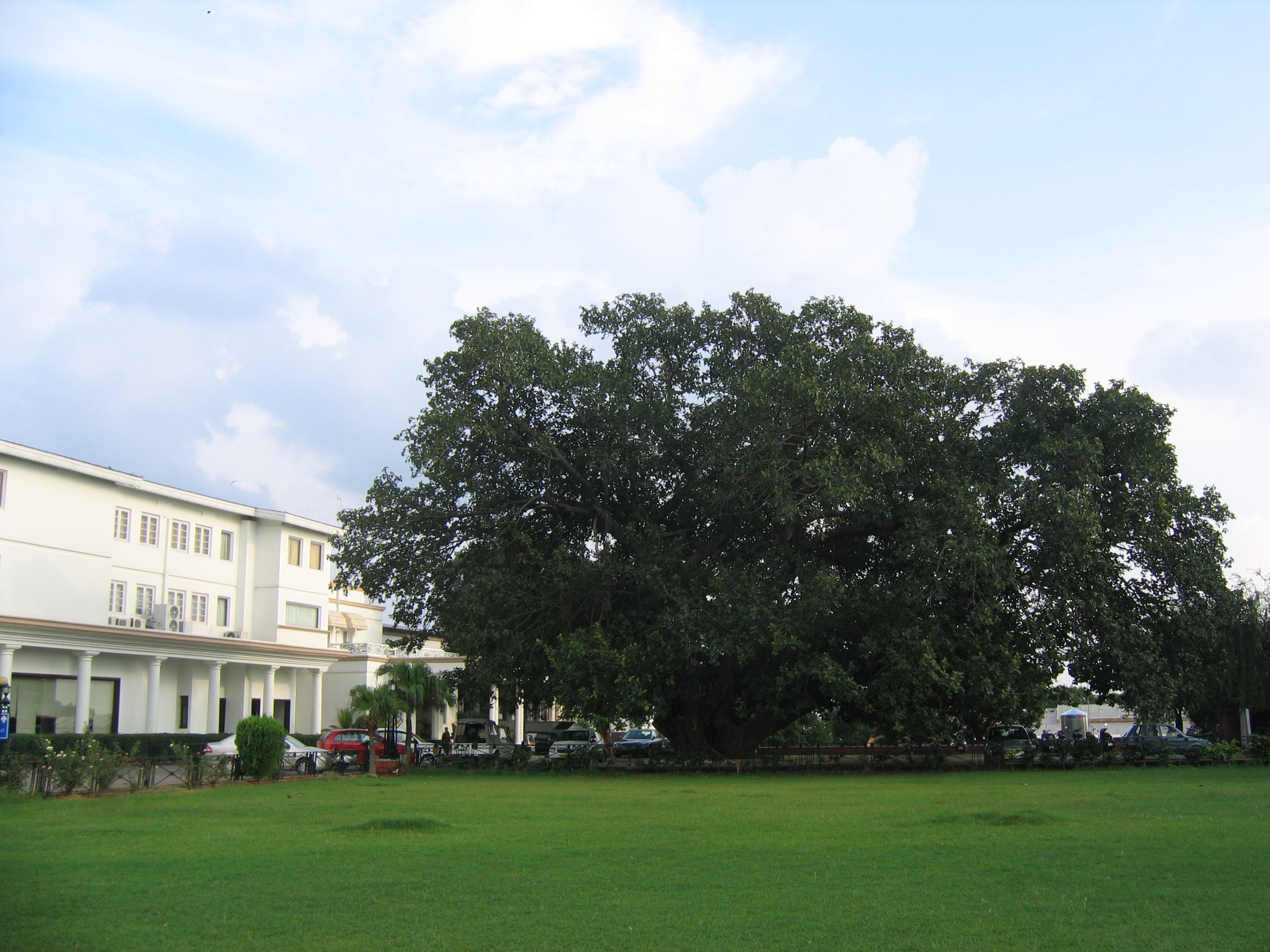
- Interactive map of the Hari Niwas Palace area

General information
- Architectural style: Art-Deco
- Location: Jammu, Jammu and Kashmir, India
- Coordinates: 32°44′47″N 74°52′21″E

Other information
- Number of rooms: 40

Website
- www.hariniwaspalace.in

The Hari Niwas Palace is a palace in Jammu, India. It overlooks the Tawi river on one side and on the other side the Trikuta hills. It was completed shortly after 1925, it served as the Maharaja’s preferred venue for receptions and leisure until his departure for Bombay following India’s independence in 1947. After periods of official use, the royal descendants converted the two‑storey Art Deco structure into a 40‑room heritage hotel in 1990, preserving its original brick‑and‑plaster form and Victorian interiors. The palace sits on a raised plinth approached by a tree‑lined driveway through mango groves, its facades combining smooth stucco, geometric relief panels, ribbon windows and stepped parapets. Within the same compound, the Amar Mahal Museum and Library showcases Sir Hari Singh’s 120 kg gold throne and an extensive collection of royal artifacts.

== History ==
The Hari Niwas Palace was commissioned by Sir Hari Singh, the last reigning Maharaja of Jammu and Kashmir (1895 - 1961), as a riverside extension to the Amar Mahal Palace built in 1890 to host guests in greater privacy than the older Mubarak Mandi Palace. Constructed in the early 20th century completed shortly after 1925. It became Sir Hari Singh’s preferred venue for receptions and leisure until he left Jammu for Bombay following India’s independence in 1947.

After passing through periods of official use, the royal descendants converted the palace into a 40‑room heritage hotel in 1990, preserving its royal legacy while adapting it for contemporary hospitality services. The descendants of the Maharaja converted the palace into a heritage hotel in 1990. In the same compound "Amar Mahal Museum and Library" displays the 120 kg gold throne of Sir Hari Singh.

== Architecture ==
Hari Niwas Palace is an exemplar of Art Deco architecture adapted to Jammu’s subtropical climate. The two‑storey brick‑and‑plaster structure rests on a raised plinth approached by a tree lined driveway through mango groves. Hari Niwas Palace comprises 40 rooms with views towards the river valley and mountains, all finished with Victorian‑style interiors and hardwood floors, and includes a Durbar hall with 300‑seat capacity and party rooms (The Magnolia and The Chinar).
