= Amar Mahal Palace =

Palace in Jammu, India

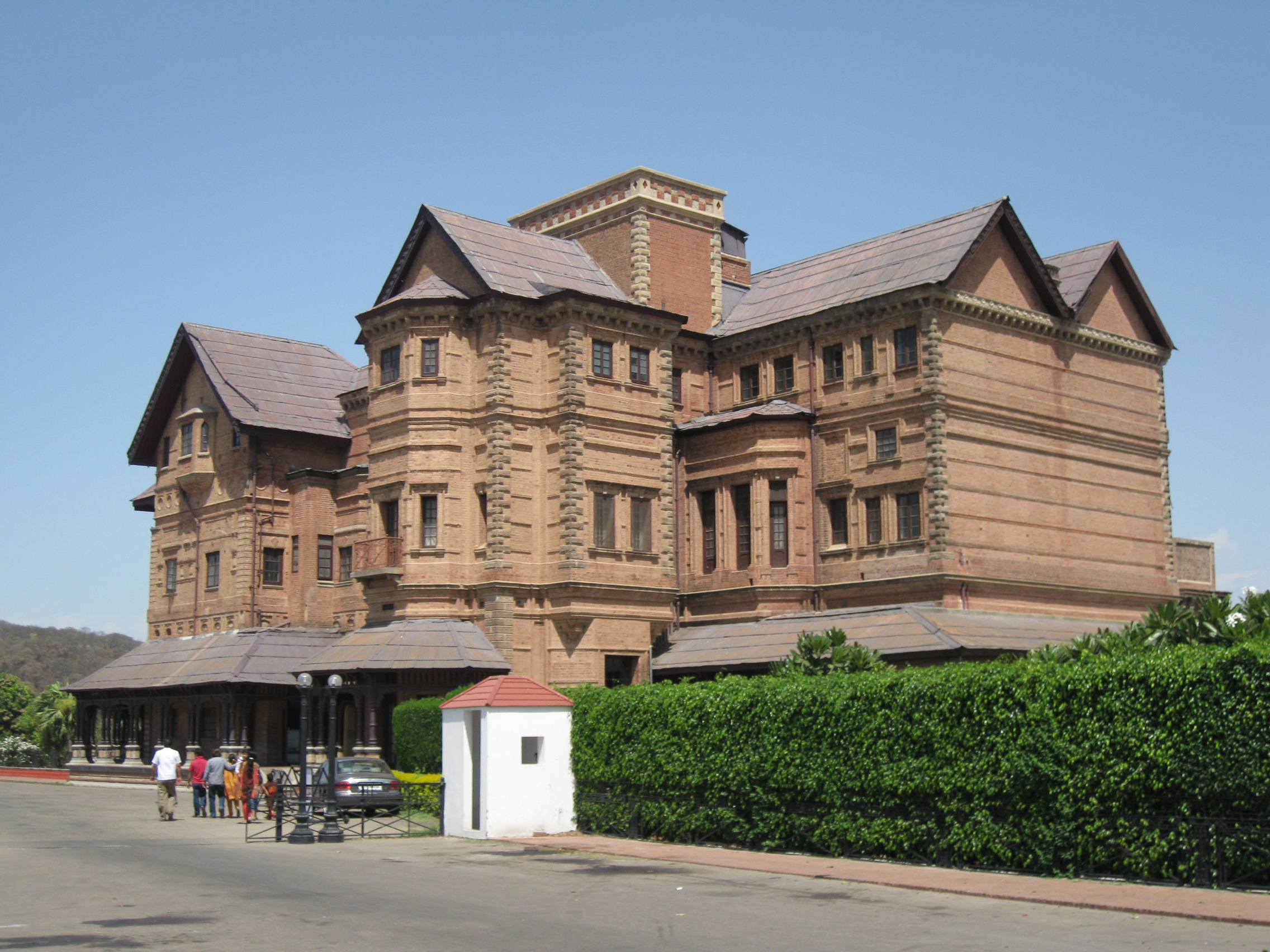
- Amar Mahal Palace Museum,

- Location within Jammu and Kashmir Location within India

General information
- Architectural style: Continental castle architecture
- Location: Jammu, India
- Coordinates: 32.748°N 74.872°E
- Completed: 1890s
- Client: Raja Amar Singh

Technical details
- Structural system: Red Sandstones and bricks

Design and construction
- Architect: French architect
- Engineer: French engineer

The Amar Mahal Palace is a palace in Jammu, in the Indian erstwhile Kingdom of Jammu and Kashmir, India. The palace has now been converted into a museum. Commissioned by Raja Amar Singh, the palace was built in the nineteenth century by a French architect on the lines of a French Chateau. The palace was donated to the Hari-Tara Charitable Trust by Karan Singh for use as a museum. It has many exhibits including a golden throne weighing 120 kg, a Pahari miniature, Kangra miniature paintings, a library of 25,000 antique books, many rare art collections, and a large collection of portraits of the royal family.

The palace was the last official residence of the Dogra dynasty and the last king of the kingdom Maharaja Hari Singh.

== Geography ==
Amar Mahal is situated on the right bank of the Tawi River, on a bend of the river, in Jammu. Tawi river is also known as Suryaputri Tawi (Suryaputri is a Hindi word meaning 'The Daughter of The Sun God').Jammu, once a princely city, is also famous for forts, palaces and temples. The Sivalik Hills or ranges to the north of the Mahal, on the left bank of the river, provide a grand view, with the Tawi River flowing in between, draining the valley. It is well located adjoining the heritage hotel known as the Hari Niwas Palace Hotel, in the heart of the city, on the road to Kashmir.

== History ==
The Amar Mahal Palace was planned by a French architect, in 1862. However, it was not built until the 1890s. Maharani Tara Devi, wife of the late Maharaja Hari Singh (son of Raja Amar Singh) lived in this palace till her death in 1967. Subsequently, her son Karan Singh and his wife Yasho Rajya Lakshmi converted the palace into a museum to house rare books and works of art, with the objective of "Encouraging artistic talent, to establish fine arts centre and to collaborate with other like minded institutions for promotion of Indian arts". For this purpose, they transferred the palace property to a trust named as the "Hari-Tara Charitable Trust". Karan Singh voluntarily surrendered the Privy Purse paid to him by the Government of India as a former ruler of Jammu, one of the Princely state of India, and used the funds to set up this museum named in memory of his parents.

The museum was inaugurated by the Indira Gandhi, Prime Minister of India, on 13 April 1975. To promote the stated objectives, the Trust arranges guided tours, book readings, lectures, film shows and hobby classes and other visitor friendly activities in the Museum. Scholarly exchanges, workshops and exhibitions are also regular features held by the Trust. The Dogra-Pahari paintings displayed in the museum were creation of the second half of the 18th century in Jammu and Himachal Pradesh of the Kangra school of art. To quote the words of Karan Singh: "The whole effect is to transport one into a fascinating miniature world with its own aura and ethos."

== Architecture ==
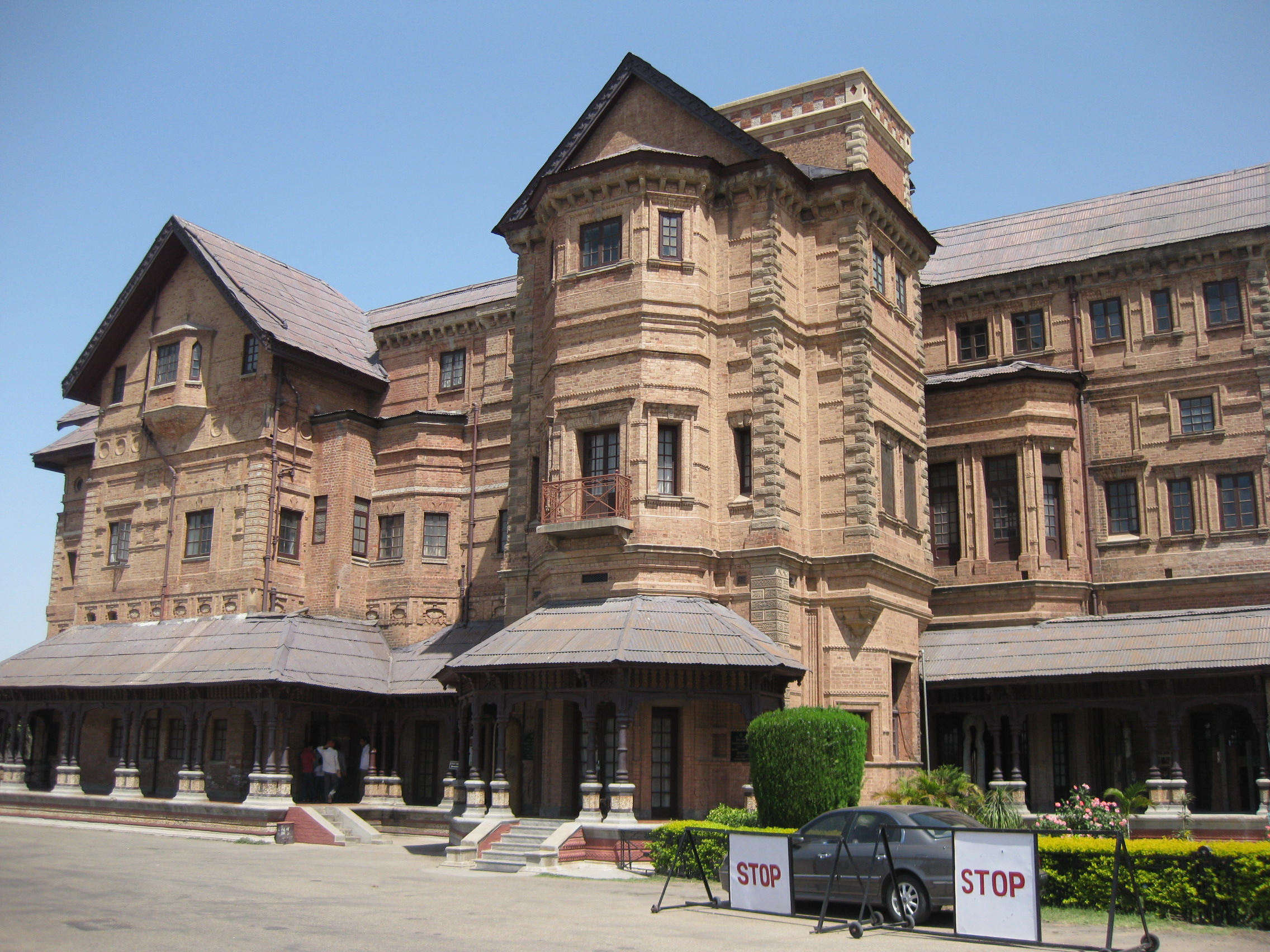
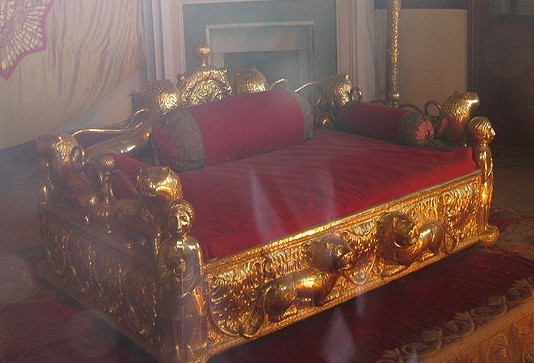
Left: Closer view of Amar Mahal Museum. Right: Golden Sofa or throne, a prized display in Amar Mahal Palace Museum

The palace built in red sandstone with red bricks is in a picturesque environment on a hillock overlooking the Tawi river valley. Built in the European castle style, the palace has sloping roofs with turrets and tall towers. When built during the reign of Raja Amar Singh, it was the tallest building in Jammu. The imposing building has long passages on three sides, which are covered by sloping corrugated tin roofs. The passages are supported on columns with wooden framework. The first floor of the palace building has French windows with connected balcony. The top floor has a bay window. The windows also depict triangular projections in classical Greek architectural style, which are fitted over ornate false columns.

== Displays ==
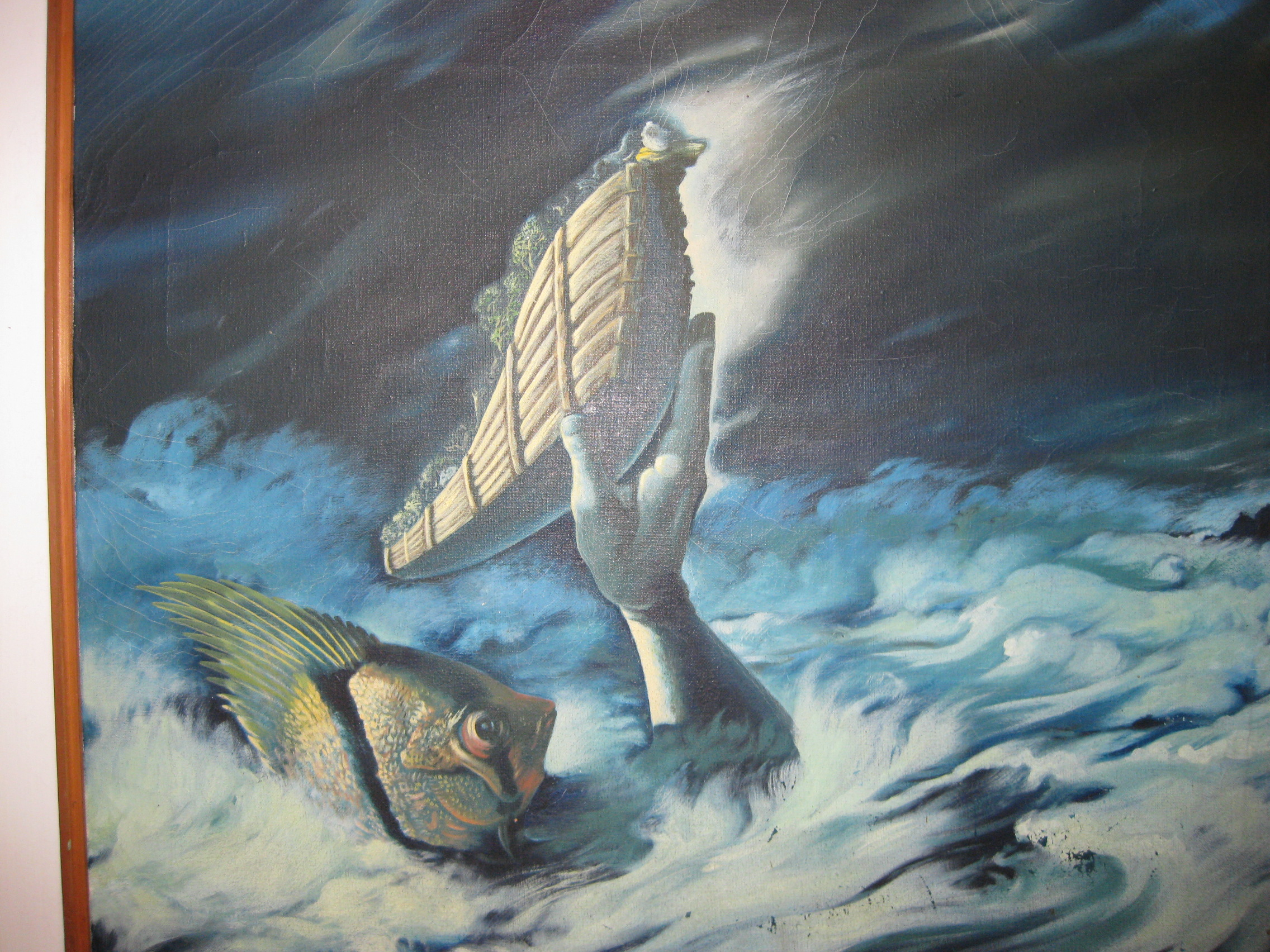
Modern painting of Dashavatara – Matsya

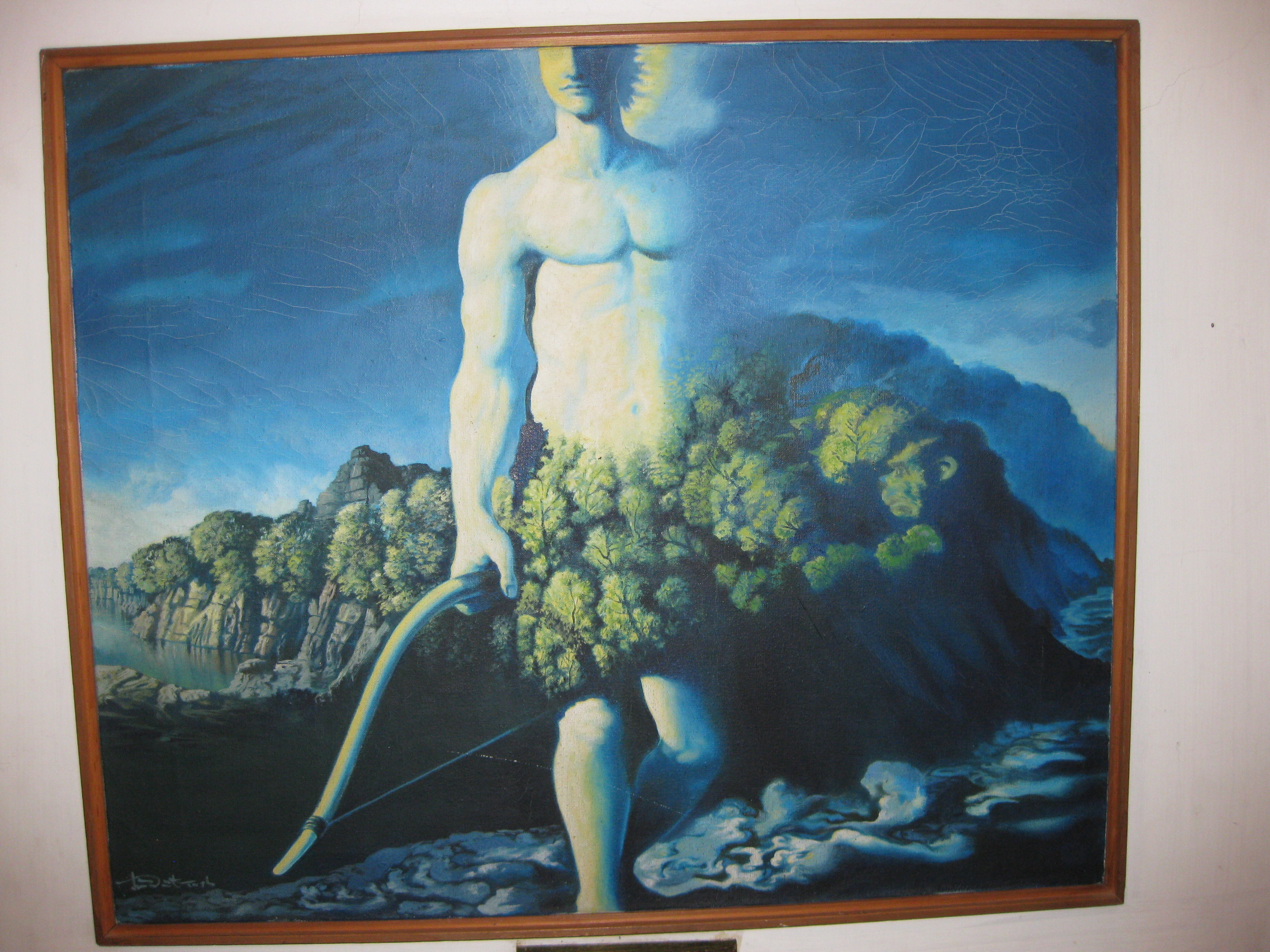
Modern painting of Dashavatara – Rama

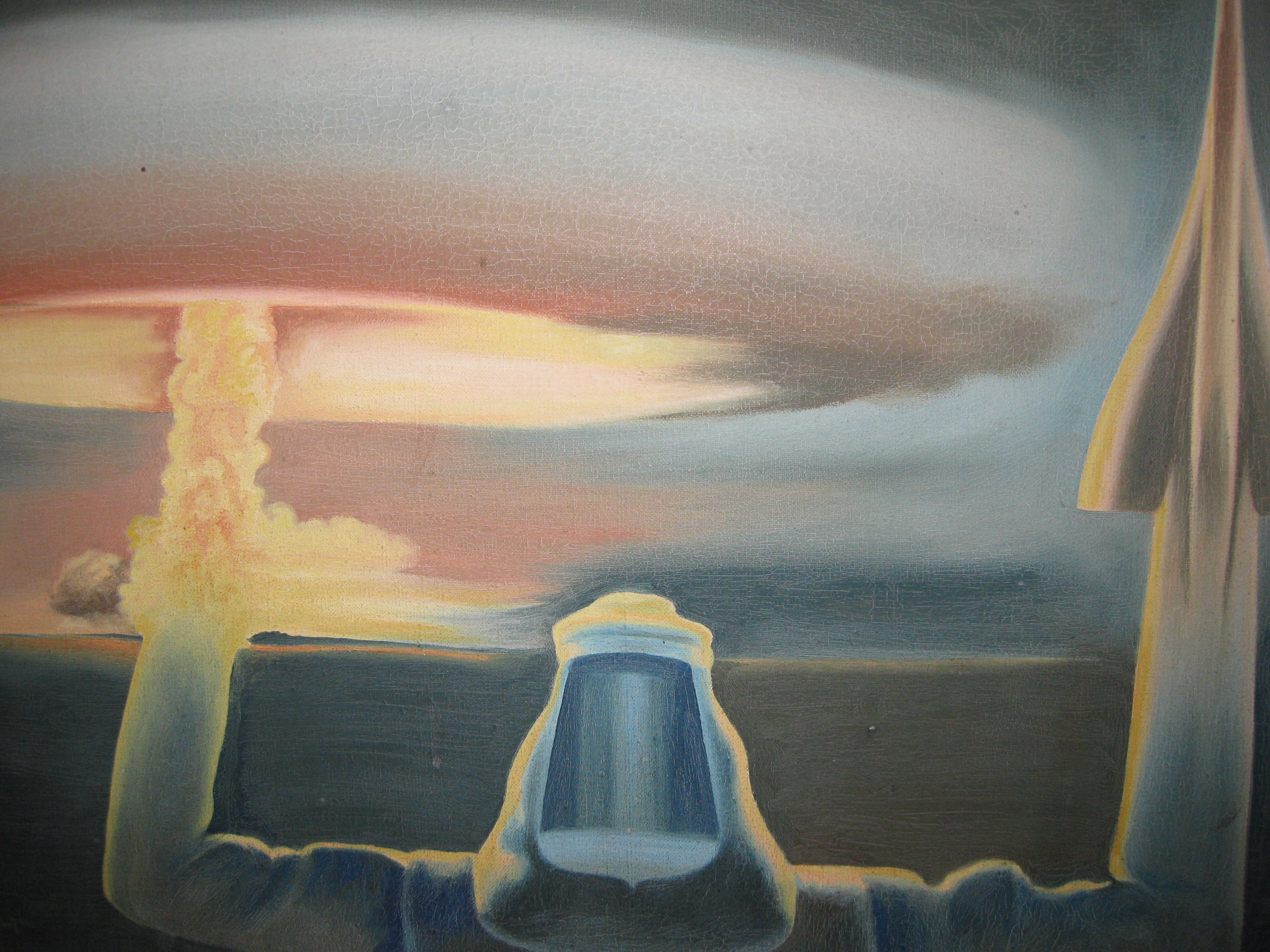
Modern painting of Dashavatara – Kalki – An Era of Atomic Bombs and Rockets

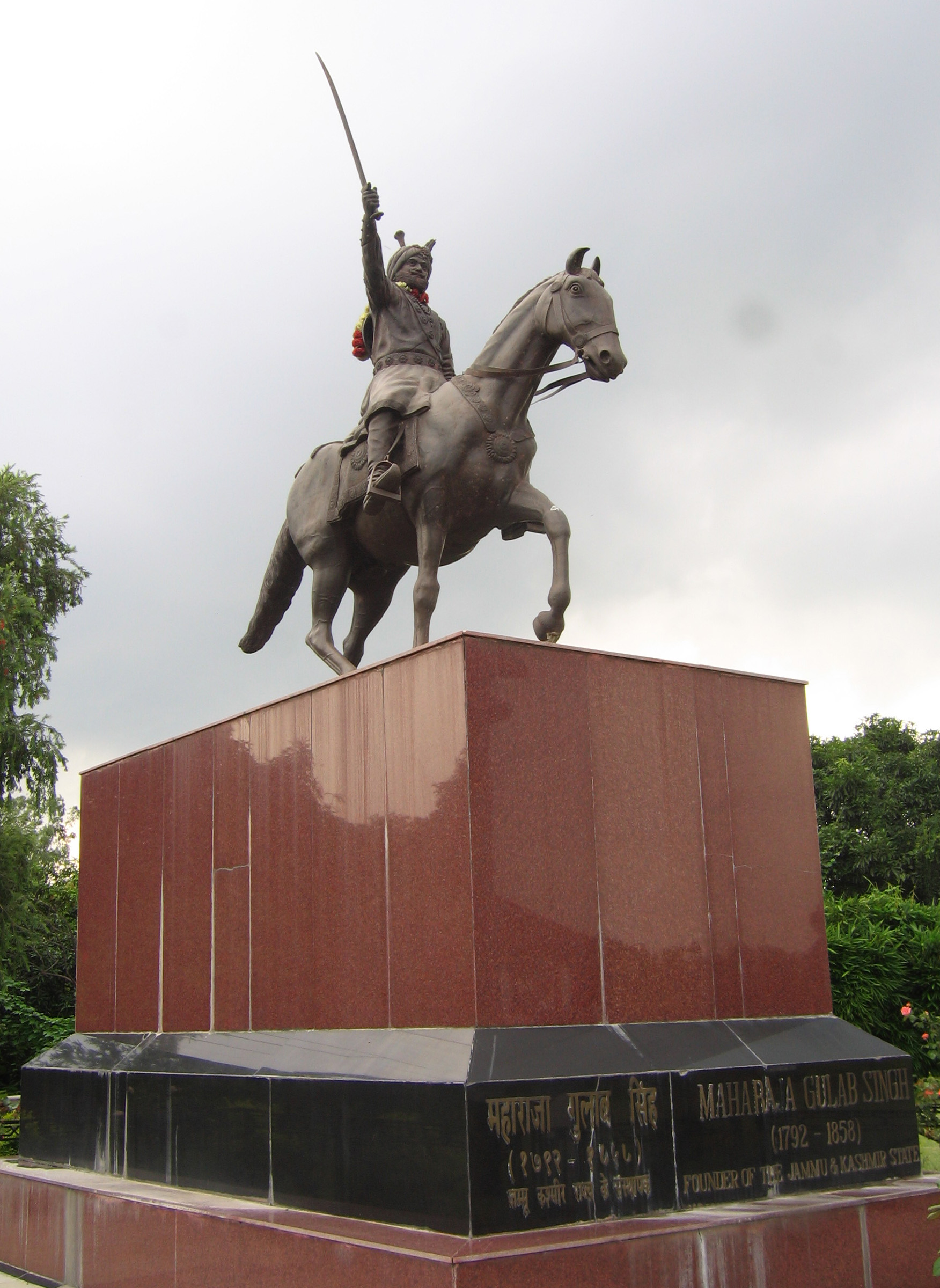
A statue of Gulab Singh of Jammu and Kashmir at Amar Mahal Palace

Only four rooms of the palace are open depicting Pahari paintings of Mahabharata epic scenes and royal memorabilia. A golden sofa of the Dogra rulers, weighing 120 kg in pure gold, embedded with golden lions at the corners, is housed in a hexagonal room in the museum, which is viewed only through glass covered window panes as the main door is kept locked for security reasons. The art works of some of the renowned Indian artists like M.F. Hussain, J.Swaminathan, G. R. Santosh, Bikash Battacharjee, Ram Kumar, Laxman Pai are also on display in the museum. In one of the galleries, paintings of Hindu epic stories such as of Nala Damayanti (a set of forty-seven miniature paintings) are depicted. Modern version of the Dashavatara paintings (ten avatars of Hindu god Vishnu) are also displayed in a separate ante-chamber in the Museum. These are unusual modern art set of paintings. Family portraits of the Dogra rulers of Jammu and Kashmir are on display in the Durbar Hall at the entrance gallery. In the first and second floors, a few chambers house the library, which has a collection of rare antique books (25,000) on religion, philosophy and political science to fiction.

An exclusive chamber in the museum, once the living quarters of the Maharani (later called the Maharajmata) Tara Devi, is conserved and exhibited in its original form where a silver bedspread, period furniture, photographs, the decoration of the Crown of India which was presented to her in 1945, her personal items of clothing and the unique Victorian bath room are on display.

== Gallery ==
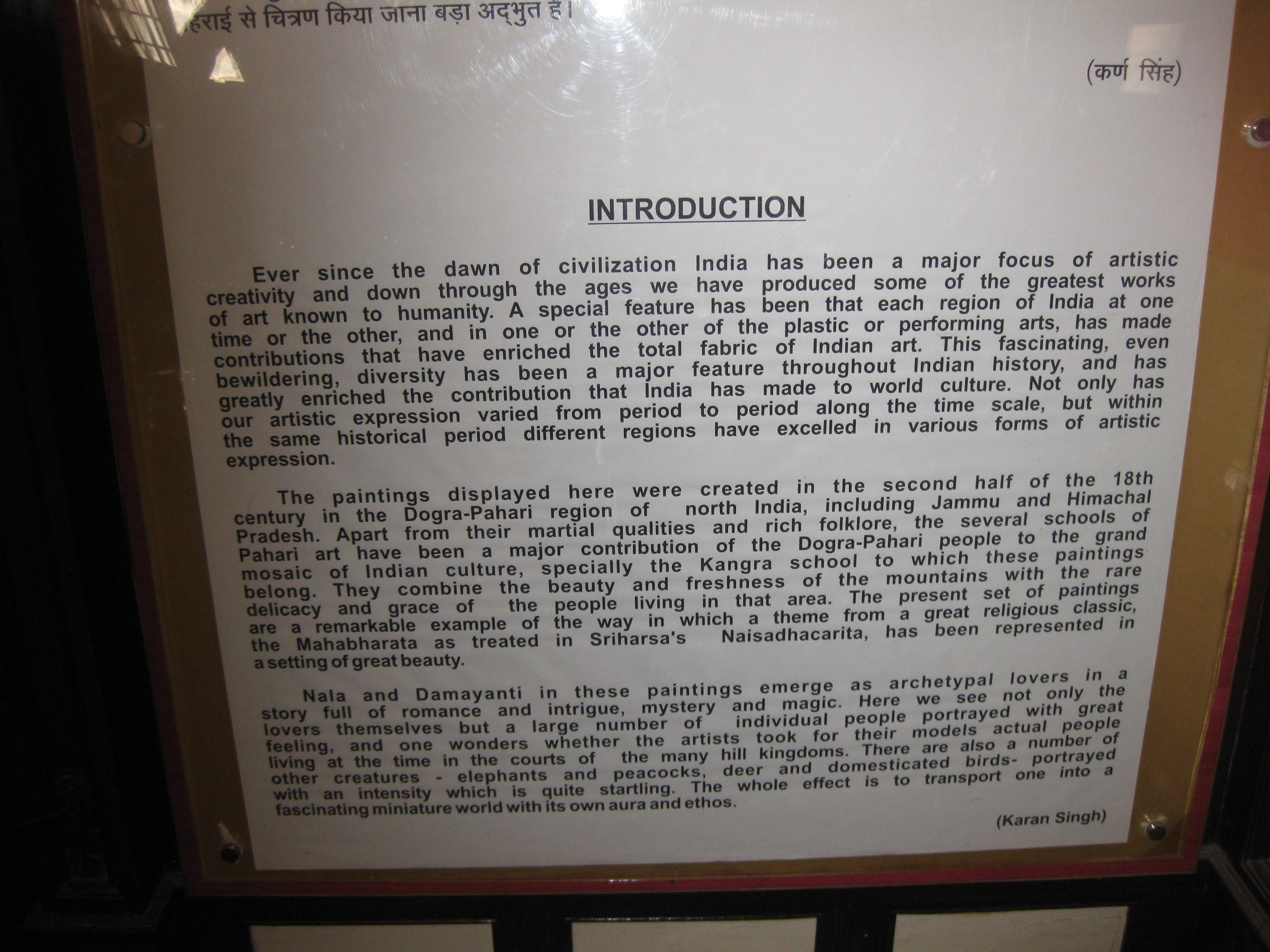
A plaque in the Amar Mahal Museum

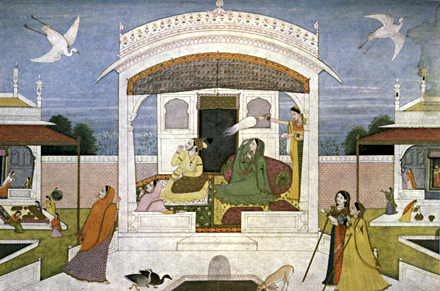
Miniature Pahari paintings

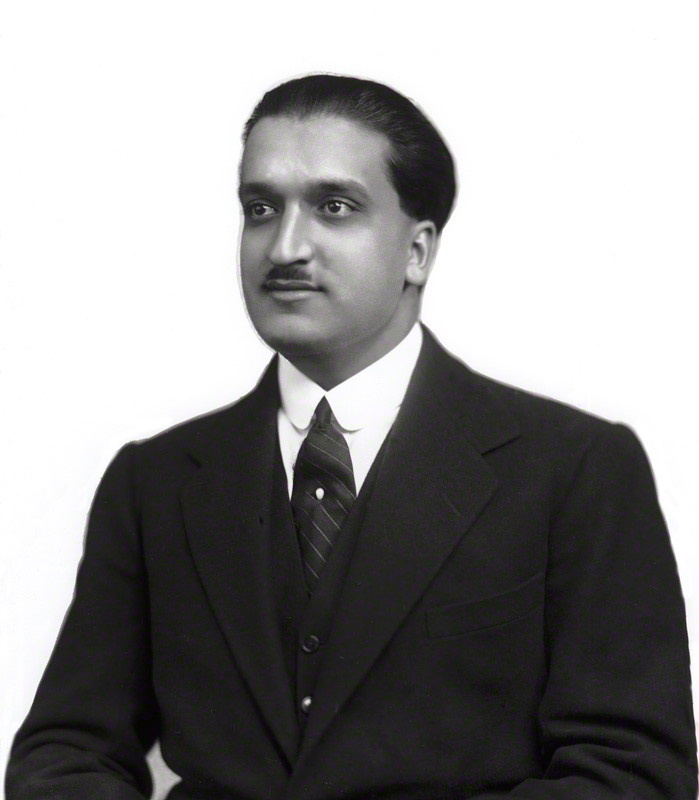
Maharaja Hari Singh
