= Kashmir conflict =

Territorial conflict in South Asia

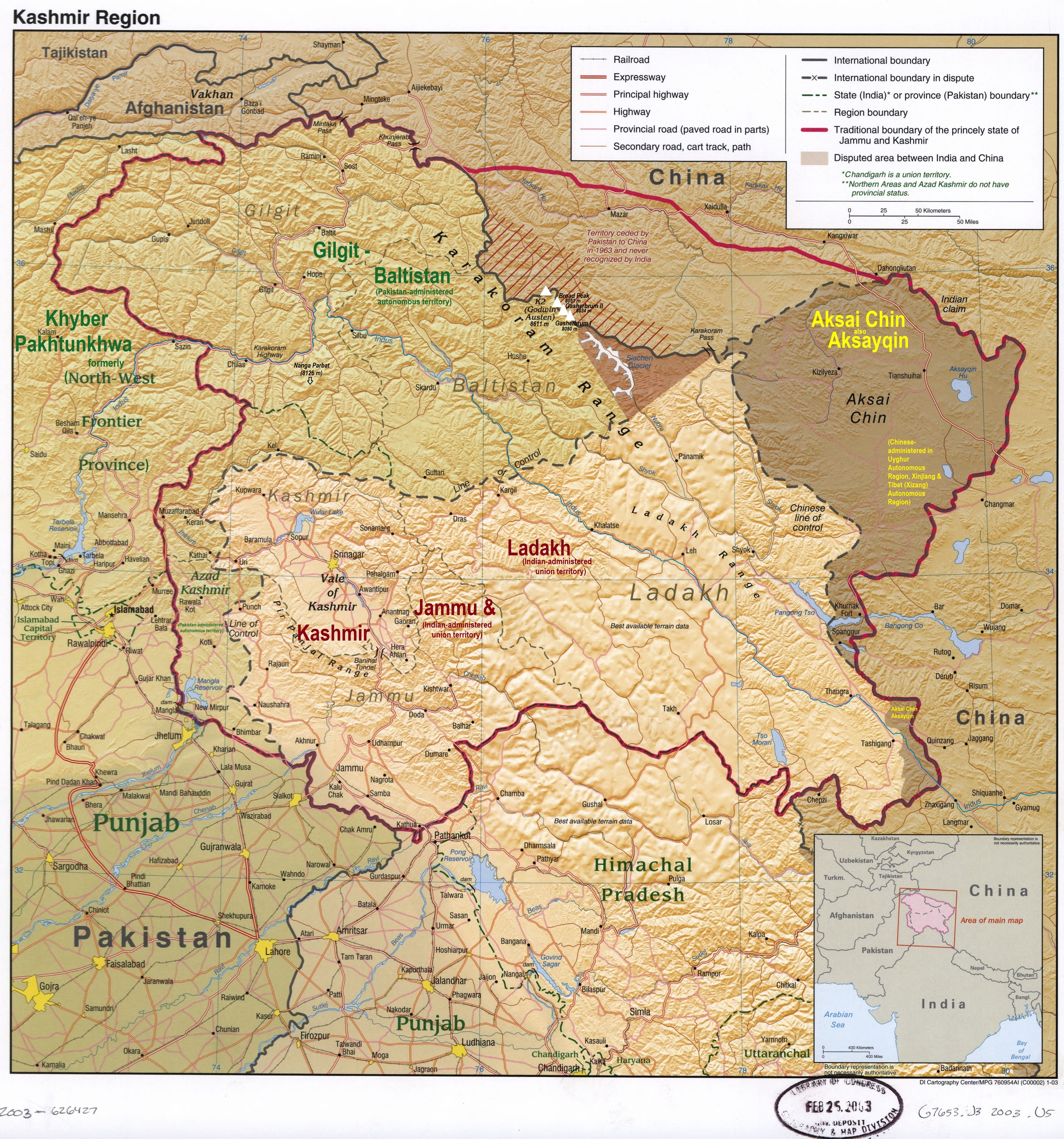
India claims the entire erstwhile British Indian princely state of Jammu and Kashmir based on an instrument of accession signed in 1947. Pakistan claims most of the region based on its Muslim-majority population, whereas China claims the largely uninhabited regions of Aksai Chin and the Shaksgam Valley.

The Kashmir conflict is a territorial conflict over the Kashmir region, primarily between India and Pakistan, and also between China and India in the northeastern portion of the region. The conflict started after the partition of India in 1947 as both India and Pakistan claimed the entirety of the former princely state of Jammu and Kashmir. It is a dispute over the region that escalated into three wars between India and Pakistan and several other armed skirmishes. India controls approximately 55% of the land area of the region that includes Jammu, the Kashmir Valley, most of Ladakh, the Siachen Glacier, and 70% of its population; Pakistan controls approximately 30% of the land area that includes Azad Kashmir and Gilgit-Baltistan; and China controls the remaining 15% of the land area that includes the Aksai Chin region, the mostly uninhabited Trans-Karakoram Tract, and part of the Demchok sector. (Note: China's secondary role mentioned in various sources.)

After the partition of India and a rebellion in the western districts of the state, Pakistani tribal militias invaded Kashmir, leading the Hindu ruler of Jammu and Kashmir to join India. The resulting Indo-Pakistani War ended with a UN-mediated ceasefire along a line that was eventually named the Line of Control. In 1962, China invaded and fought a war with India along the disputed Indo-Chinese border, including in Indian administered-Ladakh, marking their entry to the Kashmir conflict. In 1965, Pakistan attempted to infiltrate Indian-administered Kashmir to precipitate an insurgency there, resulting in another war fought by the two countries over the region. After further fighting during the war of 1971, the Simla Agreement formally established the Line of Control between the territories under Indian and Pakistani control. In 1999, an armed conflict between the two countries broke out again in Kargil with no effect on the status quo.

In 1989, an armed insurgency erupted against Indian rule in Indian-administered Kashmir Valley, after years of political disenfranchisement and alienation, with logistical support from Pakistan. The insurgency was actively opposed in Jammu and Ladakh, where it revived long-held demands for autonomy from Kashmiri dominance and greater integration with India. Spearheaded by a group seeking creation of an independent state based on demands for self-determination, the insurgency was taken over within the first few years of its outbreak by Pakistan-backed Jihadist groups striving for merger with Pakistan. The militancy continued through the 1990s and early 2000s—by which time it was being driven largely by foreign militants and spread to parts of the adjoining Jammu region—but declined thereafter. The fighting resulted in tens of thousands of casualties, both combatant and civilian. The militancy also resulted in the exodus of Kashmiri Hindus from the predominantly Muslim Kashmir Valley in the early 1990s. Counterinsurgency by the Indian government was coupled with repression of the local population and increased militarisation of the region, while various insurgent groups engaged in a variety of criminal activity. The 2010s were marked by civil unrest within the Kashmir Valley, fuelled by unyielding militarisation, rights violations, mis-rule and corruption, wherein protesting local youths violently clashed with Indian security forces, with large-scale demonstrations taking place during the 2010 (Note: Triggered by an allegedly staged encounter.) and 2016 unrests. (Note: In the aftermah of the killing of a young militant from a Jihadist group, who had risen to popularity through social media.) Further unrest in the region erupted after the 2019 Pulwama attack.

Over the course of the long conflict, and especially since the outbreak of insurgency, India and Pakistan have been accused of violating human rights in the Kashmir region, while insurgents and militants have committed many atrocities in the region. Indian security forces, including local police from the region, have committed serious excesses during counterinsurgency in the Kashmir Valley, which include human rights abuses such as extrajudicial killings, arson, torture, unlawful detentions, rape and enforced disappearances, while the government has also caused political repression in the region. Pakistan has committed abuses in Pakistan-administered Kashmir, including enforced disappearances, murder, torture, unlawful detentions and political repression, and also tacitly permits and sponsors operations of Islamist militant groups there, many of which it created, funds and arms. Insurgents and militants have committed killings and assassinations of civilians, including several massacres of religious and ethnic minorities, especially Hindus in both Jammu region and the Kashmir Valley, whom they have also driven out of the region or displaced within it, as well as abductions, arson, rapes and terrorist attacks, and forced an Islamic code of conduct on the larger society. Multiple wars and cross-border shelling between India and Pakistan along the LOC, at times aimed to enable cross-border movement of militants by Pakistan, has also caused civilian deaths and displacement. Indian security forces enjoy impunity for their actions and victims of their abuse lack legal redressal, with legislation preventing prosecution for abuses, and the government and a compliant judiciary enabling continued violations. Owing to tight controls on access by Pakistan, human rights violations in Pakistan-administered Kashmir remain underdocumented unlike those on the Indian side. The OHCHR reports on Kashmir released two reports on "the situation of human rights in Indian-Administered Kashmir and Pakistan-Administered Kashmir".

== India–Pakistan conflict ==
=== Background ===
The Afghan Durrani Empire ruled Kashmir Valley from 1752 until its 1819 conquest by the Sikh Empire under Ranjit Singh. The Raja of Jammu Gulab Singh, who was a vassal of the Sikh Empire and an influential noble in the Sikh court, sent expeditions to various border kingdoms and ended up encircling Kashmir by 1840. Following the First Anglo-Sikh War (1845–1846), Kashmir was ceded under the Treaty of Lahore to the East India Company, which transferred it to Gulab Singh through the Treaty of Amritsar, in return for the payment of indemnity owed by the Sikh empire. Gulab Singh took the title of the Maharaja of Jammu and Kashmir.

From 1846 till the 1947 partition of India, Kashmir was ruled by maharajas of Gulab Singh's Dogra dynasty, as a princely state under British Paramountcy. The British Raj managed the defence, external affairs, and communications for the princely state and stationed a British Resident in Srinagar to oversee the internal administration. According to the 1941 census, the state's population was 77 percent Muslim, 20 percent Hindu and 3 percent others (Sikhs and Buddhists). Despite its Muslim majority, the princely rule was overwhelmingly a Hindu-dominated state. The Muslim majority suffered under the high taxes of the administration and had few opportunities for growth and advancement.

=== Partition and invasion ===
The partition of India: green regions were all part of Pakistan by 1948, and orange ones part of India.

British rule in the Indian subcontinent ended in 1947 with the creation of new states: the dominions of Pakistan and India, as the successor states to British India. The British Paramountcy over the 562 Indian princely states ended. States were thereafter left to choose whether to join India or Pakistan or to remain independent. Jammu and Kashmir, the largest of the princely states, had a predominantly Muslim population ruled by the Hindu Maharaja Hari Singh. The Maharaja decided to stay independent because he expected that the State's Muslims would be unhappy with accession to India, and the Hindus and Sikhs would become vulnerable if he joined Pakistan. On 11 August, the Maharaja dismissed his prime minister Ram Chandra Kak, who had advocated equidistance from India and Pakistan. Observers and scholars interpreted this action as a tilt towards accession to India. Pakistanis decided to preempt this possibility by wresting Kashmir by force if necessary.

Pakistan made various efforts to persuade the Maharaja of Kashmir to join Pakistan. In July 1947, Mohammad Ali Jinnah is believed to have written to the Maharaja promising "every sort of favourable treatment", followed by the lobbying of the State's Prime Minister by leaders of Jinnah's Muslim League party. Faced with the Maharaja's indecision on accession, the Muslim League agents clandestinely worked in Poonch to encourage the local Muslims to an armed revolt, exploiting an internal unrest regarding economic grievances. The authorities in Pakistani Punjab waged a 'private war' by obstructing supplies of fuel and essential commodities to the State. Later in September, Muslim League officials in the Northwest Frontier Province, including the Chief Minister Abdul Qayyum Khan, assisted and possibly organized a large-scale invasion of Kashmir by Pathan tribesmen. Several sources indicate that the plans were finalised on 12 September by the Prime Minister Liaquat Ali Khan, based on proposals prepared by Colonel Akbar Khan and Sardar Shaukat Hayat Khan. One plan called for organising an armed insurgency in the western districts of the state and the other for organising a Pushtoon tribal invasion. Both were set in motion.

The Jammu division of the state got caught up in the Partition violence. Large numbers of Hindus and Sikhs from Rawalpindi and Sialkot started arriving in March 1947 following massacres in Rawalpindi, bringing "harrowing stories of Muslim atrocities." According to Ilyas Chattha, this provoked counter-violence on Jammu Muslims, which had "many parallels with that in Sialkot." The violence in the eastern districts of Jammu that started in September, developed into a widespread massacre of Muslims around October, organised by the Hindu Dogra troops of the State and perpetrated by the local Hindus, including members of the Rashtriya Swayamsevak Sangh, and the Hindus and Sikhs displaced from the neighbouring areas of West Pakistan. The Maharaja himself was implicated in some instances. A large number of Muslims were killed. Others fled to West Pakistan, some of whom made their way to the western districts of Poonch and Mirpur, which were undergoing rebellion. Many of these Muslims believed that the Maharaja ordered the killings in Jammu which instigated the Muslims in West Pakistan to join the uprising in Poonch and help in the formation of the Azad Kashmir government.

The rebel forces in the western districts of Jammu were organised under the leadership of Sardar Ibrahim, a Muslim Conference leader. They took control of most of the western parts of the State by 22 October. On 24 October, they formed a provisional Azad Kashmir (free Kashmir) government based in Palandri.

=== Accession ===
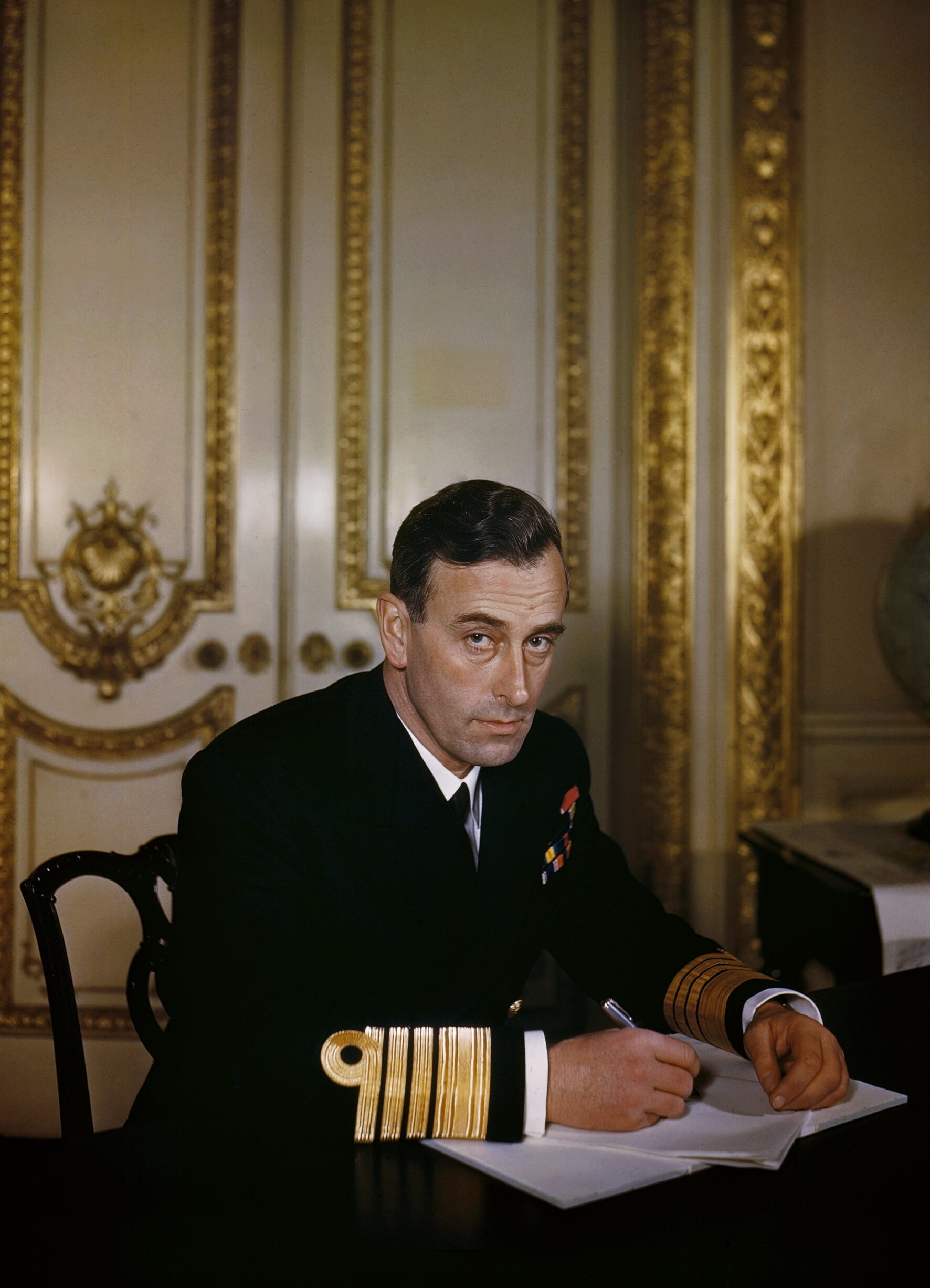
The Instrument of Accession of Kashmir to India was accepted by the Governor General of India, Lord Mountbatten.

Justice Mehr Chand Mahajan, the Maharaja's nominee for his next prime minister, visited Nehru and Patel in Delhi on 19 September 1947, requesting essential supplies which had been blockaded by Pakistan since the beginning of September. He communicated the Maharaja's willingness to accede to India. Nehru, however, demanded that the jailed political leader, Sheikh Abdullah, be released from prison and involved in the state government. Only then would he allow the state to accede. The Maharaja released Sheikh Abdullah on 29 September.

The Maharaja's troops could not withstand the tribal militia attack in September and October 1947; they were heavily outnumbered and outgunned by the tribal militias, and were also facing internal rebellions from Muslim troops. The Maharaja made an urgent plea to Delhi for military assistance. Upon the Governor General Lord Mountbatten's insistence, India required the Maharaja to accede before it could send troops. Accordingly, the Maharaja signed an instrument of accession on 26 October 1947, which was accepted by the Governor General the next day. While the Government of India accepted the accession, it added the proviso that it would be submitted to a "reference to the people" after the state is cleared of the invaders, since "only the people, not the Maharaja, could decide where Kashmiris wanted to live."; it was a provisional accession. (Note: Kashmiri leader Sheikh Abdullah noted in the UN Security Council in 1948: "the (plebiscite) offer (was) made by the Prime Minister of India when, I think, he had not the slightest need for making it, for Kashmir was in distress... The Government of India could have easily accepted the accession and said, 'All right, we accept your accession and we shall render this help.' There was no necessity for the Prime Minister of India to add the proviso while accepting the accession that 'India does not want to take advantage of the difficult situation in Kashmir.') The largest political party, National Conference, headed by Sheikh Abdullah, endorsed the accession. In the words of the National Conference leader Syed Mir Qasim, India had the "legal" as well as "moral" justification to send in the army through the Maharaja's accession and the people's support of it. (Note: Panigrahi, Jammu and Kashmir, the Cold War and the West (2009, p. 54) "According to Mir Qasim, Nehru was unwilling to send Indian army. He was insistent that the Government could not send its forces at the request of the Maharaja "although he wanted to accede to India," unless the accession was endorsed by the people of Kashmir... Sheikh Abduallah who was listening to the debate from an anteroom scribbled a note for Nehru requesting him to send the army to save Kashmir from the invaders.")

The Indian troops, which were airlifted in the early hours of 27 October, secured the Srinagar airport. The city of Srinagar was being patrolled by the National Conference volunteers with Hindus and Sikhs moving about freely among Muslims, an "incredible sight" to visiting journalists. The National Conference also worked with the Indian Army to secure the city.

In the north of the state lay the Gilgit Agency, which had been leased by British India but returned to the Maharaja shortly before Independence. Gilgit's population did not favour the State's accession to India. Sensing their discontent, Major William Brown, the Maharaja's commander of the Gilgit Scouts, mutinied on 1 November 1947, overthrowing the Governor Ghansara Singh. The bloodless coup d'état was planned by Brown to the last detail under the code name "Datta Khel". Local leaders in Gilgit formed a provisional government (Aburi Hakoomat), naming Raja Shah Rais Khan as the president and Mirza Hassan Khan as the commander-in-chief, but Major Brown had already telegraphed Khan Abdul Qayyum Khan asking Pakistan to take over. According to historian Yaqoob Khan Bangash, the provisional government lacked sway over the population which had intense pro-Pakistan sentiments. Pakistan's Political Agent, Khan Mohammad Alam Khan, arrived on 16 November and took over the administration of Gilgit. According to various scholars, the people of Gilgit as well as those of Chilas, Koh Ghizr, Ishkoman, Yasin, Punial, Hunza and Nagar joined Pakistan by choice.

=== Indo-Pakistani War of 1947 ===
Rebel forces from the western districts of the State and the Pakistani Pathan tribesmen (Note: Snedden, Kashmir The Unwritten History (2013, pp. 46–47): "[O]n 28 October [1947], The Times, while referring to the anti-Indian 'raiding forces', was still able to identify four elements among the 3,000 or so 'Muslim rebels and tribesmen' in J&K: 1) 'Muslim League agents and agitators from Pakistan'; 2) 'villagers who have raised the Pakistan flag and attacked Kashmir officials'; 3) 'Pathan [Pakhtoon] tribesmen'; 4) 'Muslim deserters from Kashmir State forces who have taken their arms with them'.") (Note: Snedden, Kashmir The Unwritten History (2013, p. 68): "Nehru informed [the Chief Ministers] that 'the actual tribesmen among the raiders are probably limited in numbers, the rest are ex-servicemen [of Poonch]'.") made rapid advances into the Baramulla sector. In the Kashmir Valley, National Conference volunteers worked with the Indian Army to drive out the 'raiders'. The resulting First Kashmir War lasted until the end of 1948.

The Pakistan army made available arms, ammunition and supplies to the rebel forces who were dubbed the "Azad Army". Pakistani army officers "conveniently" on leave and the former officers of the Indian National Army were recruited to command the forces. In May 1948, the Pakistani army officially entered the conflict, in theory to defend the Pakistan borders, but it made plans to push towards Jammu and cut the lines of communications of the Indian forces in the Mendhar Valley. C. Christine Fair notes that this was the beginning of Pakistan using irregular forces and "asymmetric warfare" to ensure plausible deniability, which has continued ever since.

On 1 November 1947, Mountbatten flew to Lahore for a conference with Jinnah, proposing that, in all the princely States where the ruler did not accede to a Dominion corresponding to the majority population (which would have included Junagadh, Hyderabad as well as Kashmir), the accession should be decided by an "impartial reference to the will of the people". Jinnah rejected the offer. According to Indian scholar A. G. Noorani, Jinnah ended up squandering his leverage.

Azad Kashmir forces and Pashtun tribesmen captured Rajouri on 7 November 1947, and over the following months subjected the city's Hindu population to lootings and killing, with few Hindu civilians managing to avoid to ordeal by either escaping the city or taking refuge among sympathetic Muslim families in nearby villages. Fear of abduction and sexual abuse led to many women dying in mass suicides and killings carried out "by their own menfolk". The situation continued until April 1948, when the Indian Armed Forces retook the city.

On 25 November, the Pakistani tribesmen and soldiers attacked and took over Mirpur, and began the Mirpur Massacre of Hindus and Sikhs in the area. An estimated 20,000+ Hindus and Sikhs were killed overall. Rapes and other crimes were also committed during the aftermath.

According to Jinnah, India acquired the accession through "fraud and violence". A plebiscite was unnecessary and states should accede according to their majority population. He was willing to urge Junagadh to accede to India in return for Kashmir. For a plebiscite, Jinnah demanded simultaneous troop withdrawal for he felt that 'the average Muslim would never have the courage to vote for Pakistan' in the presence of Indian troops and with Sheikh Abdullah in power. When Mountbatten countered that the plebiscite could be conducted by the United Nations, Jinnah, hoping that the invasion would succeed and Pakistan might lose a plebiscite, again rejected the proposal, stating that the Governors General should conduct it instead. Mountbatten noted that it was untenable given his constitutional position and India did not accept Jinnah's demand of removing Sheikh Abdullah. (Note: George Cunningham, the Governor of NWFP, observed: "The tragedy is that Jinnah could, I believe, have got India's agreement to a plebiscite under impartial control, 10 days ago, but as the tribes were then in the ascendant for the time being he thought he would hold out a bit longer for better terms. It looks as if he may now have lost his chance.")

Prime Ministers Nehru and Liaquat Ali Khan met again in December, when Nehru informed Khan of India's intention to refer the dispute to the United Nations under article 35 of the UN Charter, which allows the member states to bring to the Security Council attention situations 'likely to endanger the maintenance of international peace'.

Nehru and other Indian leaders were afraid since 1947 that the "temporary" accession to India might act as an irritant to the bulk of the Muslims of Kashmir. V.P. Menon, Secretary in Patel's Ministry of States, admitted in an interview in 1964 that India had been absolutely dishonest on the issue of plebiscite. A.G. Noorani blames many Indian and Pakistani leaders for the misery of Kashmiri people but says that Nehru was the main culprit.

=== UN mediation ===
India sought resolution of the issue at the UN Security Council, despite Sheikh Abdullah's opposition to it. Following the set-up of the United Nations Commission for India and Pakistan (UNCIP), the UN Security Council passed Resolution 47 on 21 April 1948. The measure called for an immediate cease-fire and called on the Government of Pakistan 'to secure the withdrawal from the state of Jammu and Kashmir of tribesmen and Pakistani nationals not normally resident therein who have entered the state for the purpose of fighting.' It also asked Government of India to reduce its forces to minimum strength, after which the circumstances for holding a plebiscite should be put into effect 'on the question of Accession of the state to India or Pakistan.' However, it was not until 1 January 1949 that the ceasefire could be put into effect, signed by General Douglas Gracey on behalf of Pakistan and General Roy Bucher on behalf of India. However, both India and Pakistan failed to arrive at a truce agreement due to differences over interpretation of the procedure for and the extent of demilitarisation. One sticking point was whether the Azad Kashmiri army was to be disbanded during the truce stage or at the plebiscite stage.

The UNCIP made three visits to the subcontinent between 1948 and 1949, trying to find a solution agreeable to both India and Pakistan. It reported to the Security Council in August 1948 that "the presence of troops of Pakistan" inside Kashmir represented a "material change" in the situation. A two-part process was proposed for the withdrawal of forces. In the first part, Pakistan was to withdraw its forces as well as other Pakistani nationals from the state. In the second part, "when the Commission shall have notified the Government of India" that Pakistani withdrawal has been completed, India was to withdraw the bulk of its forces. After both the withdrawals were completed, a plebiscite would be held. (Note: Brecher (1953, p. 92): 'India was "to begin to withdraw the bulk of their forces" only after "the Commission shall have notified (it) that the tribesmen and Pakistan nationals...have withdrawn...and further, that the Pakistan forces are being withdrawn." Moreover, the withdrawal of Indian forces was to be conducted "in stages to be agreed upon with the Commission," not with Pakistan.') The resolution was accepted by India but effectively rejected by Pakistan. (Note: Korbel (1953, p. 502): "Though India accepted the resolution, Pakistan attached to its acceptance so many reservations, qualifications and assumptions as to make its answer 'tantamount to rejection'.")

The Indian government considered itself to be under legal possession of Jammu and Kashmir by virtue of the accession of the state. The assistance given by Pakistan to the rebel forces and the Pashtun tribes was held to be a hostile act and the further involvement of the Pakistan army was taken to be an invasion of Indian territory. From the Indian perspective, the plebiscite was meant to confirm the accession, which was in all respects already complete, and Pakistan could not aspire to an equal footing with India in the contest.

The Pakistani government held that the state of Jammu and Kashmir had executed a standstill agreement with Pakistan which precluded it from entering into agreements with other countries. It also held that the Maharaja had no authority left to execute accession because his people had revolted and he had to flee the capital. Its position was that the Azad Kashmir movement, as well as the tribal incursions, were indigenous and spontaneous, and Pakistan's assistance to them was not open to criticism.

In short, India required an asymmetric treatment of the two countries in the withdrawal arrangements, regarding Pakistan as an 'aggressor', whereas Pakistan insisted on parity. The UN mediators tended towards parity, which was not to India's satisfaction. In the end, no withdrawal was ever carried out, India insisting that Pakistan had to withdraw first, and Pakistan contending that there was no guarantee that India would withdraw afterwards. No agreement could be reached between the two countries on the process of demilitarisation. (Note: Korbel (1953, pp. 506–507): "When a further Security Council resolution urged the governments of India and Pakistan to agree within thirty days on the demilitarization of Kashmir, on the basis of Dr. Graham's recommendation, Pakistan once more accepted and India once more refused....Dr. Graham met the Indian request for retaining in Kashmir 21,000 men, but continued to propose 6,000 soldiers on the Azad side. Pakistan could not accept the first provision and India continued to insist on its stand concerning the Azad forces. The meeting, which ended in failure, was accompanied by bitter comments in the newspapers of both India and Pakistan about United Nations intervention in the Kashmir dispute.")

Cold War historian Robert J. McMahon states that American officials increasingly blamed India for rejecting various UNCIP truce proposals under various dubious legal technicalities just to avoid a plebiscite. According to McMahon, they were right, since a Muslim majority made a vote to join Pakistan the "most likely outcome" and postponing the plebiscite would serve India's interests.

Scholars have commented that the failure of the Security Council efforts of mediation owed to the fact that the Council regarded the issue as a purely political dispute without investigating its legal underpinnings. (Note: Korbel (1953, p. 507): "With the hindsight of six years, the Council's approach, though impartial and fair, appears to have been inadequate in that it did not reflect the gravity of the Kashmir situation.... The Security Council did not deal with either of these arguments [India's assumption of the legal validity of the accession and Pakistan's refusal to recognize its validity]. Nor did it consider the possibility of asking the International Court of Justice for an advisory opinion on the juridical aspect of the conflict under Article 96 of the Charter. Nor did it invoke any provisions of Chapter VII of the Charter, which deals with 'acts of aggression'."; Subbiah (2004, p. 180): "From the beginning, the Security Council framed the problem as primarily a political dispute rather than looking to a major legal underpinning of the dispute: the Instrument of Accession's validity or lack thereof.") Declassified British papers indicate that Britain and the US had let their Cold War calculations influence their policy in the UN, disregarding the merits of the case. (Note: Ankit (2013, p. 276): To Cadogan [Britain's permanent representative at the UN], irrespective of "whether forces in question are organised or disorganised or whether they are controlled by, or enjoy the convenience of, Government of Pakistan," India was entitled to take measures for self-defence: repelling invaders, pursuing invaders into Pakistan under Article 51 of the UN Charter and charging Pakistan as aggressor under Article 35.; Ankit (2013, p. 279): Mountbatten, too, pleaded directly with Attlee along political as well as personal lines: "I am convinced that this attitude of the United States and the United Kingdom is completely wrong and will have far reaching results. Any prestige I may previously have had with my Government has of course been largely lost by my having insisted that they should make a reference to the United Nations with the assurance that they would get a square deal there.")

=== Dixon Plan ===
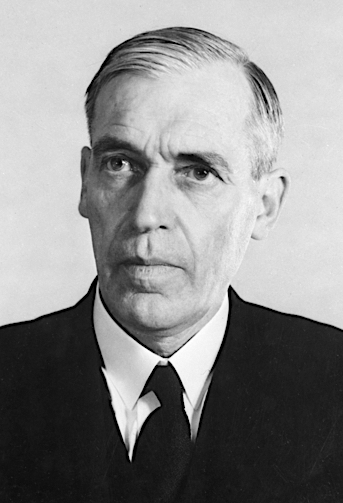
Sir Owen Dixon, UN mediator

The UNCIP appointed its successor, Sir Owen Dixon, to implement demilitarisation prior to a statewide plebiscite on the basis of General McNaughton's scheme, and to recommend solutions to the two governments. Dixon's efforts for a statewide plebiscite came to naught due to India's constant rejection of the various alternative demilitarisation proposals, for which Dixon rebuked India harshly.

Dixon then offered an alternative proposal, widely known as the Dixon plan. Dixon did not view the state of Jammu and Kashmir as one homogeneous unit and therefore proposed that a plebiscite be limited to the Valley. Dixon agreed that people in Jammu and Ladakh were clearly in favour of India; equally clearly, those in Azad Kashmir and the Northern Areas wanted to be part of Pakistan. This left the Kashmir Valley and 'perhaps some adjacent country' around Muzaffarabad in uncertain political terrain. Pakistan did not accept this plan because it believed that India's commitment to a plebiscite for the whole state should not be abandoned.

Dixon also had concerns that the Kashmiris, not being high-spirited people, may vote under fear or improper influences. Following Pakistan's objections, he proposed that Sheikh Abdullah administration should be held in "commission" (in abeyance) while the plebiscite was held. This was not acceptable to India which rejected the Dixon plan. Another grounds for India's rejection of the limited plebiscite was that it wanted Indian troops to remain in Kashmir for "security purposes", but would not allow Pakistani troops the same. However, Dixon's plan had encapsulated a withdrawal by both sides. Dixon had believed a neutral administration would be essential for a fair plebiscite.

Dixon came to the conclusion that India would never agree to conditions and a demilitarization which would ensure a free and fair plebiscite. Dixon's failure also compounded American ambassador Loy Henderson's misgivings about Indian sincerity and he advised the US to maintain a distance from the Kashmir dispute, which the US subsequently did, and leave the matter for Commonwealth nations to intervene in.

=== 1950 military standoff ===
The convening of the Constituent Assembly in Indian Kashmir in July 1950 proved contentious. Pakistan protested to the Security Council which informed India that this development conflicted with the parties' commitments. The National Conference rejected this resolution and Nehru supported this by telling Dr Graham that he would receive no help in implementing the Resolution. A month later Nehru adopted a more conciliatory attitude, telling a press conference that the Assembly's actions would not affect India's plebiscite commitment. The delay caused frustration in Pakistan and Zafrullah Khan went on to say that Pakistan was not keeping a warlike mentality but did not know what Indian intransigence would lead Pakistan and its people to. India accused Pakistan of ceasefire violations and Nehru complained of 'warmongering propaganda' in Pakistan. On 15 July 1951 the Pakistani Prime Minister complained that the bulk of the Indian Army was concentrated on the Indo-Pakistan border.

The prime ministers of the two countries exchanged telegrams accusing each other of bad intentions. Liaquat Ali Khan rejected Nehru's charge of warmongering propaganda. Khan called it a distortion of the Pakistani press' discontent with India over its persistence in not holding a plebiscite and a misrepresentation of the desire to liberate Kashmir as an anti-Indian war. Khan also accused India of raising its defence budget in the past two years, a charge which Nehru rejected while expressing surprise at Khan's dismissal of the 'virulent' anti-Indian propaganda. Khan and Nehru also disagreed on the details of the no-war declarations. Khan then submitted a peace plan calling for a withdrawal of troops, settlement in Kashmir by plebiscite, renouncing the use of force, end to war propaganda and the signing of a no-war pact. Nehru did not accept the second and third components of this peace plan. The peace plan failed. While an opposition leader in Pakistan did call for war, leaders in both India and Pakistan did urge calm to avert disaster.

The Commonwealth had taken up the Kashmir issue in January 1951. Australian prime minister Robert Menzies suggested that a Commonwealth force be stationed in Kashmir; that a joint Indo-Pakistani force be stationed in Kashmir and the plebiscite administrator be entitled to raise local troops while the plebiscite would be held. Pakistan accepted these proposals but India rejected them because it did not want Pakistan, who was in India's eyes the 'aggressor', to have an equal footing. The UN Security Council called on India and Pakistan to honour the resolutions of plebiscite both had accepted in 1948 and 1949. The United States and Britain proposed that if the two could not reach an agreement then arbitration would be considered. Pakistan agreed but Nehru said he would not allow a third person to decide the fate of four million people. Korbel criticised India's stance towards a ″valid″ and ″recommended technique of international co-operation.″

However, the peace was short-lived. Later by 1953, Sheikh Abdullah, who was by then in favour of resolving Kashmir by a plebiscite, an idea which was "anathema" to the Indian government according to historian Zutshi, fell out with the Indian government. He was dismissed and imprisoned in August 1953. His former deputy, Bakshi Ghulam Mohammad was subsequently appointed as the prime minister, and Indian security forces were deployed in the Valley to control the streets.

=== Nehru's plebiscite offer ===
In May 1953, the US Secretary of State John Foster Dulles recommended India and Pakistan seek a bilateral solution. Around this time, Sheikh Abdullah fell out with the Indian government and lost the support of his colleageues in his cabinet. He was dismissed and imprisoned in August 1953. His former deputy, Bakshi Ghulam Mohammad was appointed as the prime minister, and Indian security forces were deployed in the Valley to control the streets.

With India's "abridged authority" in Kashmir, Nehru decided that a settlement must be found. India could not hold Kashmir "at the point of a bayonet". Starting in July 1953, he made a renewed push on the plebiscite option in discussions with Pakistan. In bilateral talks held in Delhi in August 1953, he proposed that a plebiscite administrator be appointed within six months. Other than demanding that the plebiscite administrator not be from one of the major powers, he placed no other conditions. Historian Gowher Rizvi notes a "dramatic reversal" of India's earlier position. "Nehru was now willing to offer virtually everything that Pakistan had been seeking since 1947". Nehru suggested that the plebiscite could be held in all regions of the state and the state could be partitioned on the basis of the results. He was open to a "different approach" to the scaling back of troops in the State so as to allow a free vote.

Pakistani prime minister Bogra was able to return home triumphantly. However, in the face of questions and criticisms from colleagues, his commitment began to waver. The main objection from the Pakistani leaders was to Nehru's demand for replacing the plebiscite administrator (Admiral Nimitz, appointed by the UN Security Council) with somebody from a smaller neutral power that had no strategic interests in the region. Pakistanis suspected sinister motives and time was whittled away.

=== Cold War ===
The USA in February 1954 announced that it wanted to provide military aid to Pakistan. The US signed a military pact with Pakistan in May by which Pakistan would receive military equipment and training. The US president tried to alleviate India's concerns by offering similar weaponry to India. This was an unsuccessful attempt. Nehru's misgivings about the US-Pakistan pact made him hostile to a plebiscite. Consequently, when the pact was concluded in May 1954, Nehru withdrew the plebiscite offer and declared that the status quo was the only remaining option.

Nehru's withdrawal from the plebiscite option came as a major blow to all concerned. Scholars have suggested that India was never seriously intent on holding a plebiscite. (Note: A. G. Noorani wondered whether India "seriously contemplated" plebiscite even in 1948. Australian diplomat Walter Crocker believed that Nehru was never seriously intent on holding a plebiscite and was determined to get out of it. Historian Benjamin Zachariah states that Nehru abandoned the idea of plebiscite by late 1948, but supported it in public till 1954.)

Indian writer Nirad C. Chaudhuri has observed that Pakistan's acceptance of Western support ensured its survival. He believed that India intended to invade Pakistan twice or thrice during the period 1947–1954. For scholar Wayne Wilcox, Pakistan was able to find external support to counter "Hindu superiority", returning to the group security position of the early 20th century.

=== Sino-Indian War ===
In 1962, troops from the People's Republic of China and India clashed in territory claimed by both. China won a swift victory in the war. Aksai Chin, part of which was under Chinese jurisdiction before the war, remained under Chinese control since then. Another smaller area, the Trans-Karakoram, was demarcated as the Line of Control (LOC) between China and Pakistan, although some of the territory on the Chinese side is claimed by India to be part of Kashmir. The line that separates India from China in this region is known as the "Line of Actual Control".

=== Operation Gibraltar and 1965 Indo-Pakistani war ===
Following its failure to seize Kashmir in 1947, Pakistan supported numerous 'covert cells' in Kashmir using operatives based in its New Delhi embassy. After its military pact with the United States in the 1950s, it intensively studied guerrilla warfare through engagement with the US military. In 1965, it decided that the conditions were ripe for a successful guerilla war in Kashmir. Code named 'Operation Gibraltar', companies were dispatched into Indian-administered Kashmir, the majority of whose members were razakars (volunteers) and mujahideen recruited from Pakistani-administered Kashmir and trained by the Army. These irregular forces were supported by officers and men from the paramilitary Northern Light Infantry and Azad Kashmir Rifles as well as commandos from the Special Services Group. About 30,000 infiltrators are estimated to have been dispatched in August 1965 as part of the 'Operation Gibraltar'.

The plan was for the infiltrators to mingle with the local populace and incite them to rebellion. Meanwhile, guerilla warfare would commence, destroying bridges, tunnels and highways, as well as Indian Army installations and airfields, creating conditions for an 'armed insurrection' in Kashmir. If the attempt failed, Pakistan hoped to have raised international attention to the Kashmir issue. Using the newly acquired sophisticated weapons through the American arms aid, Pakistan believed that it could achieve tactical victories in a quick limited war.

However, the 'Operation Gibraltar' ended in failure as the Kashmiris did not revolt. Instead, they turned in infiltrators to the Indian authorities in substantial numbers, and the Indian Army ended up fighting the Pakistani Army regulars. Pakistan claimed that the captured men were Kashmiri 'freedom fighters', a claim contradicted by the international media. (Note: Varshney, Three Compromised Nationalisms (1992, p. 216): Independent observers could get no evidence of it. The New York Times found that "most of the prisoners captured thus far do not speak the Kashmiri dialect. They speak... Punjabi and other dialects."... The Washington Post remarked: "The Moslem Pakistanis, led by President Ayub, had expected the infiltrators to be able to produce a general uprising and this is Ayub's first disappointment."... Once again, it seemed clear that whatever the state of their relationship with India, Kashmiris did not wish to embrace Pakistan.) On 1 September, Pakistan launched an attack across the Cease Fire Line, targeting Akhnoor in an effort to cut Indian communications into Kashmir. In response, India broadened the war by launching an attack on Pakistani Punjab across the international border. The war lasted until 23 September, ending in a stalemate. Following the Tashkent Agreement, both the sides withdrew to their pre-conflict positions, and agreed not to interfere in each other's internal affairs.

=== 1971 Indo-Pakistani war and Simla Agreement ===
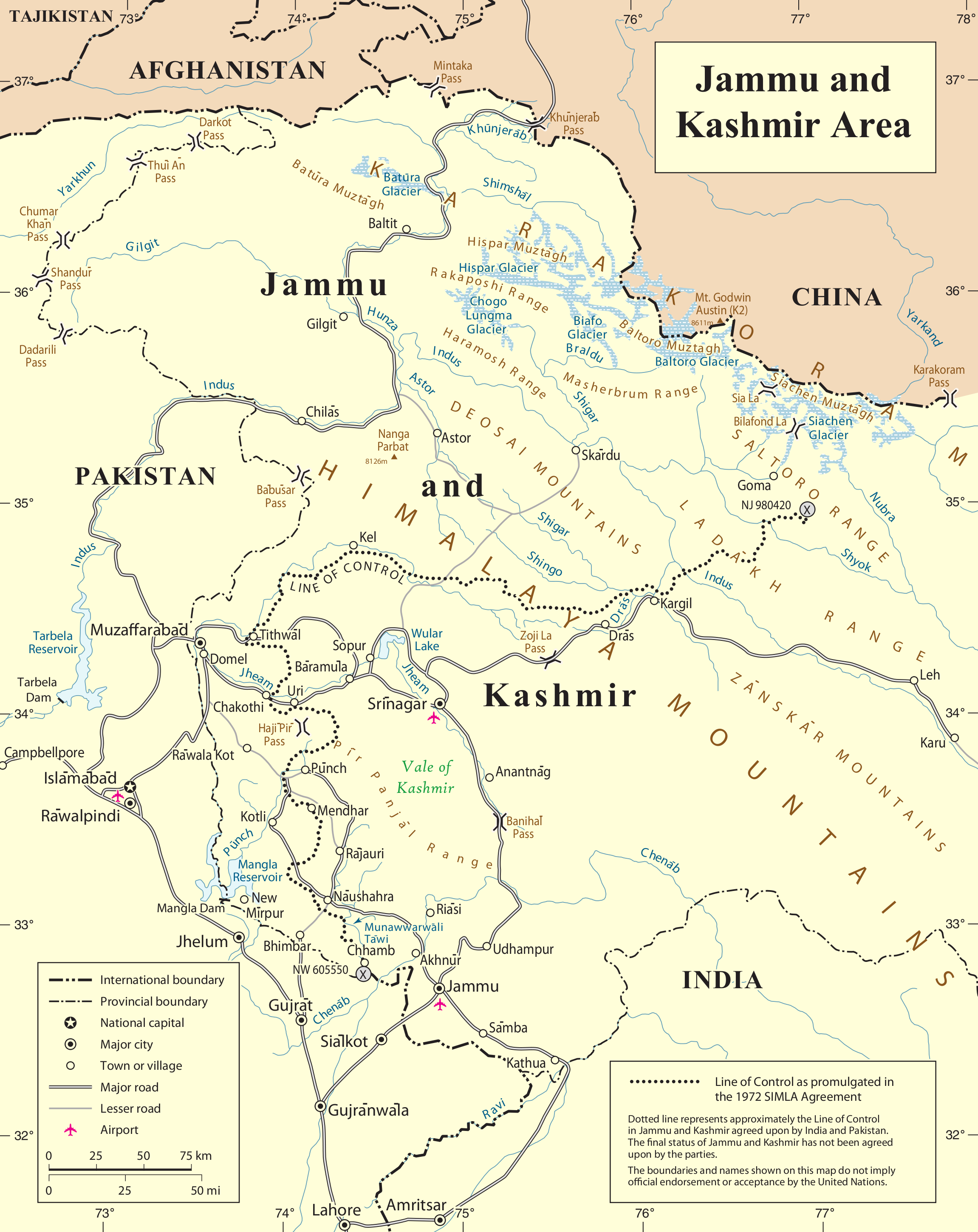
The Line of Control between India and Pakistan agreed in the Simla Agreement (UN Map)

The Indo-Pakistani War of 1971 led to a loss for Pakistan and a military surrender in East Pakistan. Bangladesh was created as a separate state with India's support and India emerged as a clear regional power in South Asia.

A bilateral summit was held at Simla as a follow-up to the war, where India pushed for peace in South Asia. At stake were 5,139 square miles (13,310 km^{2}) of Pakistan's territory captured by India during the conflict, and over 90,000 prisoners of war held in Bangladesh. India was ready to return them in exchange for a "durable solution" to the Kashmir issue. Diplomat J. N. Dixit states that the negotiations at Simla were painful and tortuous, and almost broke down. The deadlock was broken in a personal meeting between the Prime Ministers Zulfikar Ali Bhutto and Indira Gandhi, where Bhutto acknowledged that the Kashmir issue should be finally resolved and removed as a hurdle in India-Pakistan relations; that the cease-fire line, to be renamed the Line of Control, could be gradually converted into a de jure border between India and Pakistan; and that he would take steps to integrate the Pakistani-controlled portions of Jammu and Kashmir into the federal territories of Pakistan. However, he requested that the formal declaration of the Agreement should not include a final settlement of the Kashmir dispute as it would endanger his fledgling civilian government and bring in military and other hardline elements into power in Pakistan.

Accordingly, the Simla Agreement was formulated and signed by the two countries, whereby the countries resolved to settle their differences by peaceful means through bilateral negotiations and to maintain the sanctity of the Line of Control. Multilateral negotiations were not ruled out, but they were conditional upon both sides agreeing to them. To India, this meant an end to the UN or other multilateral negotiations. However Pakistan reinterpreted the wording in the light of a reference to the "UN charter" in the agreement, and maintained that it could still approach the UN. The United States, United Kingdom and most Western governments agree with India's interpretation.

The Simla Agreement also stated that the two sides would meet again for establishing durable peace. Reportedly Bhutto asked for time to prepare the people of Pakistan and the National Assembly for a final settlement. Indian commentators state that he reneged on the promise. Bhutto told the National Assembly on 14 July that he forged an equal agreement from an unequal beginning and that he did not compromise on the right of self-determination for Jammu and Kashmir. The envisioned meeting never occurred.

=== Kargil War (1999) ===
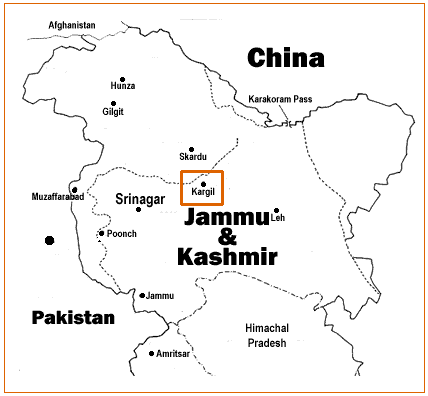
Location of starting the war

In mid-1999, alleged insurgents and Pakistani soldiers from Pakistani Kashmir infiltrated Jammu and Kashmir. During the winter season, Indian forces regularly move down to lower altitudes, as severe climatic conditions makes it almost impossible for them to guard the high peaks near the Line of Control. This practice is followed by both India and Pakistan Army. The terrain makes it difficult for both sides to maintain a strict border control over Line of Control. The insurgents took advantage of this and occupied vacant mountain peaks in the Kargil range overlooking the highway in Indian Kashmir that connects Srinagar and Leh. By blocking the highway, they could cut off the only link between the Kashmir Valley and Ladakh. This resulted in a large-scale conflict between the Indian and Pakistani armies. The final stage involved major battles by Indian and Pakistani forces, with India recapturing most of the territories held by Pakistani forces.

Fears of the Kargil War turning into a nuclear war provoked the then-United States President Bill Clinton to pressure Pakistan to retreat. The Pakistan Army withdrew their remaining troops from the area, ending the conflict. India regained control of the Kargil peaks, which they now patrol and monitor all year long.

== Internal conflict ==
=== Political movements during the Dogra rule (1846–1947) ===
In 1932 Sheikh Abdullah, a Kashmiri, and Chaudhry Ghulam Abbas, a Jammuite, led the founding of the All-Jammu and Kashmir Muslim Conference in order to agitate for the rights of Muslims in the state. In 1938, they renamed the party National Conference in order to make it representative of all Kashmiris independent of religion. The move brought Abdullah closer to Jawaharlal Nehru, the rising leader of the Congress party. The National Conference eventually became a leading member of the All-India States Peoples' Conference, a Congress-sponsored confederation of the political movements in the princely states.

Three years later, rifts developed within the Conference owing to political, regional and ideological differences. A faction of the party's leadership grew disenchanted with Abdullah's leanings towards Nehru and the Congress, and his secularisation of Kashmiri politics. Consequently, Abbas broke away from the National Conference and revived the old Muslim Conference in 1941, in collaboration with Mirwaiz Yusuf Shah. These developments indicated fissures between the ethnic Kashmiris and Jammuites, as well as between the Hindus and Muslims of Jammu. Muslims in the Jammu region were Punjabi-speaking and felt closer affinity to Punjabi Muslims than with the Valley Kashmiris. In due course, the Muslim Conference started aligning itself ideologically with the All-India Muslim League, and supported its call for an independent 'Pakistan'. The Muslim Conference derived popular support among the Muslims of the Jammu region, and some from the Valley. Conversely, Abdullah's National Conference enjoyed influence in the Valley. Chitralekha Zutshi states that the political loyalties of Valley Kashmiris were divided in 1947, but the Muslim Conference failed to capitalise on it due its fractiousness and the lack of a distinct political programme.

In 1946, the National Conference launched the 'Quit Kashmir' movement, asking the Maharaja to hand the power over to the people. The movement came under criticism from the Muslim Conference, who charged that Abdullah was doing it to boost his own popularity, waning because of his pro-India stance. Instead, the Muslim Conference launched a 'campaign of action' similar to Muslim League's programme in British India. Both Abdullah and Abbas were imprisoned. By 22 July 1947, the Muslim Conference started calling for the state's accession to Pakistan.

The Dogra Hindus of Jammu were originally organised under the banner of All Jammu and Kashmir Rajya Hindu Sabha, with Prem Nath Dogra as a leading member. In 1942, Balraj Madhok arrived in the state as a pracharak of the Rashtriya Swayamsevak Sangh (RSS). He established branches of the RSS in Jammu and later in the Kashmir Valley. Prem Nath Dogra was also the chairman (sanghchalak) of the RSS in Jammu. In May 1947, following the Partition plan, the Hindu Sabha threw in its support to whatever the Maharaja might decide regarding the state's status, which in effect meant support for the state's independence. However, following the communal upheaval of the Partition and the tribal invasion, its position changed to supporting the accession of the state to India and, subsequently, full integration of Jammu with India. In November 1947, shortly after the state's accession to India, the Hindu leaders launched the Jammu Praja Parishad with the objective of achieving the "full integration" of Jammu and Kashmir with India, opposing the "communist-dominated anti-Dogra government of Sheikh Abdullah."

=== Autonomy and plebiscite (1947–1953) ===
Article 370 was drafted in the Indian constitution granting special autonomous status to the state of Jammu and Kashmir, as per Instrument of Accession. This article specifies that the State must concur in the application of laws by Indian parliament, except those that pertain to Communications, Defence and Foreign Affairs. Central Government could not exercise its power to interfere in any other areas of governance of the state.

In a broadcast on 2 November 1947, Prime Minister Jawaharlal Nehru announced that the fate of Kashmir would ultimately be decided by the people, once law and order was established, through a referendum "held under international auspices like the United Nations." A similar pledge was made by the Government of India when the Kashmir dispute was referred to the UN Security Council on 1 January 1948. By some accounts Mountbatten had an understanding with Nehru that a referendum on the region's future would be held later.

Sheikh Abdullah took oath as Prime Minister of the state on 17 March 1948. In 1949, the Indian government obliged Hari Singh to leave Jammu and Kashmir and yield the government to Sheikh Abdullah. Karan Singh, the son of the erstwhile Maharajah Hari Singh was made the Sadr-i-Riyasat (Constitutional Head of State) and the Governor of the state.

Elections were held for the Constituent Assembly of Jammu and Kashmir in 1951, with 75 seats allocated for the Indian administered part of Kashmir, and 25 seats left reserved for the Pakistan administered part. Sheikh Abdullah's National Conference won all 75 seats in a rigged election. In October 1951, Jammu & Kashmir National Conference under the leadership of Sheikh Abdullah formed the Constituent Assembly of Jammu and Kashmir to formulate the Constitution of the state. Sheikh initially wanted the Constituent Assembly to decide the State's accession. But this was not agreed to by Nehru, who stated that such "underhand dealing" would be very bad, as the matter was being decided by the UN.

Sheikh Abdullah was said to have ruled the state in an undemocratic and authoritarian manner during this period.

According to historian Zutshi, in the late 1940s, most Kashmiri Muslims in Indian Kashmir were still debating the value of the state's association with India or Pakistan. By the 1950s, she says, the National Conference government's repressive measures and the Indian state's seeming determination to settle the state's accession to India without a reference to the people of the state brought Kashmiri Muslims to extol the virtues of Pakistan and condemn India's high-handedness in its occupation of the territory, and even those who had been in India's favour began to speak in terms of the state's association with Pakistan.

In early 1949, an agitation was started by Jammu Praja Parishad, a Hindu nationalist party which was active in the Jammu region, over the ruling National Conference's policies. The government swiftly suppressed it by arresting as many as 294 members of the Praja Parishad including Prem Nath Dogra, its president. Though Sheikh's land reforms were said to have benefited the people of rural areas, Praja Parishad opposed the 'Landed Estates Abolition Act', saying it was against the Indian Constitutional rights, for implementing land acquisition without compensation. Praja Parishad also called for the full integration with the rest of India, directly clashing with the demands of National Conference for complete autonomy of the state. On 15 January 1952, students staged a demonstration against the hoisting of the state flag alongside the Indian Union flag. They were penalised, giving rise to a big procession on 8 February. The military was called out and a 72-hour curfew imposed. N. Gopalaswami Ayyangar, the Indian Central Cabinet minister in charge of Kashmir affairs, came down to broker peace, which was resented by Sheikh Abdullah.

In order to break the constitutional deadlock, Nehru invited the National Conference to send a delegation to Delhi. The '1952 Delhi Agreement' was formulated to settle the extent of applicability of the Indian Constitution to the Jammu and Kashmir and the relation between the State and Centre. It was reached between Nehru and Abdullah on 24 July 1952. Following this, the Constituent Assembly abolished the monarchy in Kashmir, and adopted an elected Head of State (Sadr-i Riyasat). However, the Assembly was reluctant to implement the remaining measures agreed to in the Delhi Agreement.

In 1952, Sheikh Abdullah drifted from his previous position of endorsing accession to India to insisting on the self-determination of Kashmiris.

The Praja Parishad undertook a civil disobedience campaign for a third time in November 1952, which again led to repression by the state government. The Parishad accused Abdullah of communalism (sectarianism), favouring the Muslim interests in the state and sacrificing the interests of the others. The Jana Sangh joined hands with the Hindu Mahasabha and Ram Rajya Parishad to launch a parallel agitation in Delhi. In May 1953, Shyama Prasad Mukherjee, a prominent Indian leader of the time and the founder of Hindu nationalist party Bharatiya Jana Sangh (later evolved as BJP), made a bid to enter Jammu and Kashmir after denying to take a permit, citing his rights as an Indian citizen to visit any part of the country. Abdullah prohibited his entry and promptly arrested him when he attempted. An estimated 10,000 activists were imprisoned in Jammu, Punjab and Delhi, including Members of Parliament. Unfortunately, Mukherjee died in detention on 23 June 1953, leading to an uproar in whole India and precipitating a crisis that went out of control.

Observers state that Abdullah became upset, as he felt, his "absolute power" was being compromised in India.

Meanwhile, Nehru's pledge of a referendum to people of Kashmir did not come into action. Sheikh Abdullah advocated complete independence and had allegedly joined hands with US to conspire against India.

On 8 August 1953, Sheikh Abdullah was dismissed as prime minister by the Sadr-i-Riyasat Karan Singh on the charge that he had lost the confidence of his cabinet. He was denied the opportunity to prove his majority on the floor of the house. He was also jailed in 1953 while Sheikh's dissident deputy, Bakshi Ghulam Mohammad was appointed as the new Prime Minister of the state.

=== Period of integration and rise of Kashmiri separatism (1954–1974) ===
From all the information I have, 95 per cent of Kashmir Muslims do not wish to be or remain Indian citizens. I doubt therefore the wisdom of trying to keep people by force where they do not wish to stay. This cannot but have serious long-term political consequences, though immediately it may suit policy and please public opinion.

— Jayaprakash Narayan's letter to Nehru, May 1, 1956.

Bakshi Mohammad implemented all the measures of the '1952 Delhi Agreement'. In May 1954, as a subsequent to the Delhi agreement, The Constitution (Application to Jammu and Kashmir) Order, 1954, is issued by the President of India under Article 370, with the concurrence of the Government of the State of Jammu and Kashmir. In that order, the Article 35A is added to the Constitution of India to empower the Jammu and Kashmir state's legislature to define "permanent residents" of the state and provide special rights and privileges to those permanent residents.

On 15 February 1954, under the leadership of Bakshi Mohammad, the Constituent Assembly of Jammu and Kashmir ratified the state's accession to India. On 17 November 1956, the Constitution of Jammu and Kashmir was adopted by the Assembly and it came into full effect on 26 January 1957. On 24 January 1957, the UN passed a resolution stating that the decisions of the Constituent Assembly would not constitute a final disposition of the State, which needs to be carried out by a free and impartial plebiscite.

Meanwhile, in Pakistan administered Azad Jammu and Kashmir, the 1955 Poonch uprising begins in February 1955 against the governments dismissal of Sardar Ibrahim Khan. The rebellion would only be quashed in 1956.

After the overthrow of Sheikh Abdullah, his lieutenant Mirza Afzal Beg formed the Plebiscite Front on 9 August 1955 to fight for the plebiscite demand and the unconditional release of Sheikh Abdullah. The activities of the Plebiscite Front eventually led to the institution of the infamous Kashmir Conspiracy Case in 1958 and two other cases. On 8 August 1958, Abdullah was arrested on the charges of these cases.

India's Home Minister, Pandit Govind Ballabh Pant, during his visit to Srinagar in 1956, declared that the State of Jammu and Kashmir was an integral part of India and there could be no question of a plebiscite to determine its status afresh, hinting that India would resist plebiscite efforts from then on.

After the mass unrest due to missing of holy relic from the Hazratbal Shrine on 27 December 1963, the State Government dropped all charges in the Kashmir Conspiracy Case as a diplomatic decision, on 8 April 1964. Sheikh Abdullah was released and returned to Srinagar where he was accorded a great welcome by the people of the valley. After his release he was reconciled with Nehru. Nehru requested Sheikh Abdullah to act as a bridge between India and Pakistan and make President Ayub Khan of Pakistan agree to come to New Delhi for the talks for a final solution of the Kashmir problem. President Ayub Khan also sent telegrams to Nehru and Sheikh Abdullah with the message that as Pakistan too was a party to the Kashmir dispute any resolution of the conflict without its participation would not be acceptable to Pakistan. Sheikh Abdullah went to Pakistan in the spring of 1964. President Ayub Khan held extensive talks with him to explore various avenues for solving the Kashmir problem and agreed to come to Delhi in mid June for talks with Nehru as suggested by him. Even the date of his proposed visit was fixed and communicated to New Delhi. However, while Abdullah was still in Pakistan, news came of the sudden death of Nehru on 27 May 1964. The peace initiative died with Nehru.

After Nehru's death in 1964, Abdullah was interned from 1965 to 1968 and exiled from Kashmir in 1971 for 18 months. The Plebiscite Front was also banned. This was allegedly done to prevent him and the Plebiscite Front which was supported by him, from taking part in elections in Kashmir.

On 21 November 1964, the Articles 356 and 357 of the Indian Constitution were extended to the state, by virtue of which the Central Government can assume the government of the State and exercise its legislative powers. On 24 November 1964, the Jammu and Kashmir Assembly passed a constitutional amendment changing the elected post of Sadr-i-Riyasat to a centrally-nominated post of "Governor" and renaming "Prime Minister" to "Chief Minister", which is regarded as the "end of the road" for the Article 370, and the Constitutional autonomy guaranteed by it. On 3 January 1965, prior to 1967 Assembly elections, the Jammu and Kashmir National Conference dissolved itself and merged into the Indian National Congress, as a marked centralising strategy.

After Indo-Pakistani War of 1965, Kashmiri nationalists Amanullah Khan and Maqbool Bhat, along with Hashim Qureshi, in 1966, formed another Plebiscite Front in Azad Kashmir with an armed wing called the National Liberation Front (NLF), with the objective of freeing Kashmir from Indian occupation and then liberating the whole of Jammu and Kashmir. Later in 1976, Maqbool Bhat is arrested on his return to the Valley. Amanullah Khan moved to England and there NLF was renamed Jammu and Kashmir Liberation Front (JKLF).

Shortly after 1965 war, Kashmiri Pandit activist and writer, Prem Nath Bazaz wrote that the overwhelming majority of Kashmir's Muslims were unfriendly to India and wanted to get rid of the political setup, but did not want to use violence for this purpose. He added : "It would take another quarter century of repression and generation turnover for the pacifist approach to yield decisively as armed struggle, qualifying Kashmiris as 'reluctant secessionists'."

In 1966 the Indian opposition leader Jayaprakash wrote to Indian Prime Minister Indira Gandhi that India rules Kashmir by force.

In 1974, the State Subject law was officially abolished in Gilgit Baltistan, which allowed any Pakistani to settle and buy land.

=== Revival of National Conference (1975–1983) ===
In 1971, the declaration of Bangladesh's independence was proclaimed on 26 March by Sheikh Mujibur Rahman, and subsequently the Bangladesh Liberation War broke out in erstwhile East Pakistan between Pakistan and Bangladesh which was later joined by India, and subsequently war broke out on the western border of India between India and Pakistan, both of which culminated in the creation of Bangladesh.

It is said that, Sheikh Abdullah, watching the alarming turn of events in the subcontinent, realized that for the survival of the region, there was an urgent need to stop pursuing confrontational politics and promoting solution of issues by a process of reconciliation and dialogue. Critics of Sheikh hold the view that he gave up the cherished goal of plebiscite for gaining Chief Minister's chair. He started talks with the then Prime Minister Indira Gandhi for normalizing the situation in the region and came to an accord with her, called 1975 Indira-Sheikh accord, by giving up the demand for a plebiscite in lieu of the people being given the right to self-rule by a democratically elected Government (as envisaged under article 370 of the Constitution of India), rather than the "puppet government" which is said to have ruled the state until then. Sheikh Abdullah revived the National Conference, and Mirza Afzal Beg's Plebiscite Front was dissolved in the NC. Sheikh assumed the position of Chief Minister of Jammu and Kashmir again after 11 years. Later in 1977, the Central Government and the ruling Congress Party withdrew its support so that the State Assembly had to be dissolved and mid term elections called. Sheikh's party National Conference won a majority (47 out of 74 seats) in the subsequent elections, on the pledge to restore Jammu and Kashmir's autonomy, and Sheikh Abdullah was re-elected as Chief Minister. The 1977 Assembly election is regarded as the first "free and fair" election in the Jammu and Kashmir state.

He remained as Chief Minister of Jammu and Kashmir until his death in 1982. Later his eldest son Farooq Abdullah succeeded him as the Chief Minister of the state.

During the 1983 Assembly elections, Indira Gandhi campaigned aggressively, raising the bogey of a 'Muslim invasion' in the Jammu region because of the Resettlement Bill, passed by the then NC government, which gave Kashmiris who left for Pakistan between 1947 and 1954 the right to return, reclaim their properties and resettle. On the other hand, Farooq Abdullah allied with the Mirwaiz Maulvi Mohammed Farooq for the elections and charged that the state's autonomy had been eroded by successive Congress Party governments. The strategies yielded dividends and the Congress won 26 seats, while the NC secured 46. Barring an odd constituency, all victories of the Congress were in the Jammu and Ladakh regions, while NC swept the Kashmir Valley. This election is said to have cemented the political polarization on religious lines in the Jammu and Kashmir state.

After the results of the 1983 election, the Hindu nationalists in the state were demanding stricter central government control over the state whereas Kashmir's Muslims wanted to preserve the state's autonomy. Islamic fundamentalist groups clamoured for a plebiscite. Maulvi Farooq challenged the contention that there was no longer a dispute on Kashmir. He said that the people's movement for plebiscite would not die even though India thought it did when Sheikh Abdullah died.

In 1983, learned men of Kashmiri politics testified that Kashmiris had always wanted to be independent. But the more serious-minded among them also realised that this is not possible, considering Kashmir's size and borders.

According to historian Mridu Rai, for three decades Delhi's handpicked politicians in Kashmir had supported the State's accession to India in return for generous disbursements from Delhi. Rai states that the state elections were conducted in Jammu and Kashmir, but except for the 1977 and 1983 elections no state election was fair.

Kashmiri Pandit activist Prem Nath Bazaz wrote that if free elections were held, the majority of seats would be won by those not friendly to India.

=== Rise of the separatist movement and Islamism (1984–1986) ===
Increasing anti-Indian protests took place in Kashmir in the 1980s. The Soviet-Afghan jihad and the Islamic Revolution in Iran were becoming sources of inspiration for large numbers of Kashmiri Muslim youth. The state authorities responded with increasing use of brute force to simple economic demands. Both the pro-Independence Jammu and Kashmir Liberation Front (JKLF) and the pro-Pakistan Islamist groups including JIJK mobilised the fast growing anti-Indian sentiments among the Kashmiri population. 1984 saw a pronounced rise in terrorist violence in Kashmir. When Kashmir Liberation Front militant Maqbool Bhat was executed in February 1984, strikes and protests by Kashmiri nationalists broke out in the region. Large numbers of Kashmiri youth participated in widespread anti India demonstrations, which faced heavy handed reprisals by Indian state forces. Critics of the then Chief Minister, Farooq Abdullah, charged that Abdullah was losing control. His visit to Pakistan administered Kashmir became an embarrassment, where according to Hashim Qureshi, he shared a platform with Kashmir Liberation Front. Though Abdullah asserted that he went on behalf of Indira Gandhi and his father, so that sentiments there could "be known first hand", few people believed him. There were also allegations that he had allowed Khalistan terrorist groups to train in Jammu province, although those allegations were never proved. On 2 July 1984, Ghulam Mohammad Shah, who had support from Indira Gandhi, replaced his brother-in-law Farooq Abdullah and became the chief minister of Jammu and Kashmir, after Abdullah was dismissed, in what was termed as a political "coup".

In 1986 some members of the JKLF crossed over to Pakistan to receive arms training but the Jamaat Islami Jammu Kashmir, which saw Kashmiri nationalism as contradicting Islamic universalism and its own desire for merging with Pakistan, did not support the JKLF movement. As late as that year, Jamaat member Syed Ali Shah Geelani, who later became a supporter of Kashmir's armed revolt, urged that the solution for the Kashmir issue be arrived at through peaceful and democratic means. To achieve its goal of self-determination for the people of Jammu and Kashmir the Jamaat e Islami's stated position was that the Kashmir issues be resolved through constitutional means and dialogue.

Shah's administration, which did not have the people's mandate, turned to Islamists and opponents of India, notably the Molvi Iftikhar Hussain Ansari, Mohammad Shafi Qureshi and Mohinuddin Salati, to gain some legitimacy through religious sentiments. This gave political space to Islamists who previously lost overwhelmingly, allegedly due to massive rigging, in the 1983 state elections. In 1986, Shah decided to construct a mosque within the premises of an ancient Hindu temple inside the New Civil Secretariat area in Jammu to be made available to the Muslim employees for 'Namaz'. People of Jammu took to streets to protest against this decision, which led to a Hindu-Muslim clash. On his return to Kashmir valley in February 1986, Gul Shah retaliated and incited the Kashmiri Muslims by saying Islam khatrey mein hey (trans. Islam is in danger). As a result, communal violence gripped the region, in which Hindus were targeted, especially the Kashmiri pandits, who later in the year 1990, fled the valley in large numbers. During the Anantnag riot in February 1986, many houses and other properties belonging to Hindus were looted, burnt or damaged.

Shah called in the army to curb the violence on the Hindus, but it had little effect. His government was dismissed on 12 March 1986, by the then Governor Jagmohan following communal riots in south Kashmir. This led Jagmohan to rule the state directly.

Jagmohan is said to have failed to distinguish between the secular forms and Islamist expressions of Kashmiri identity, and hence saw that identity as a threat. This failure was exploited by the Islamists of the valley, who defied the 'Hindu nationalist' policies implemented during Jagmohan's tenure, and thereby gained momentum. The political fight was hence being portrayed as a conflict between "Hindu" New Delhi (Central Government), and its efforts to impose its will in the state, and "Muslim" Kashmir, represented by political Islamists and clerics. Jagmohan's pro-Hindu bias in the administration led to an increase in the appeal of the Muslim United Front.

=== 1987 state elections ===
An alliance of Islamic parties organized into Muslim United Front (MUF) to contest the 1987 state elections. Culturally, the growing emphasis on secularism led to a backlash with Islamic parties becoming more popular. MUF's election manifesto stressed the need to solve all outstanding issues according to the Simla agreement, work for Islamic unity and against political interference from the centre. Their slogan was wanting the law of the Quran in the Assembly.

There was highest recorded participation in this election. 80% of the people in the Valley voted. MUF received victory in only 4 of the contested 43 electoral constituencies despite its high vote share of 31 per cent (this means that its official vote in the Valley was larger than one-third). The elections were widespreadly believed to have been rigged by the ruling party National Conference, allied with the Indian National Congress. In the absence of rigging, commentators believe that the MUF could have won fifteen to twenty seats, a contention admitted by the National Conference leader Farooq Abdullah. Scholar Sumantra Bose, on the other hand. opines that the MUF would have won most of the constituencies in the Kashmir Valley.

BBC News reported that Khem Lata Wukhloo, who was a leader of the Congress party at the time, admitted the widespread rigging in Kashmir. He stated: I remember that there was a massive rigging in 1987 elections. The losing candidates were declared winners. It shook the ordinary people's faith in the elections and the democratic process.

Meanwhile, in Pakistan administered Gilgit Baltistan, the state sponsored 1988 Gilgit Massacre led by Osama bin Laden and other extremist groups take place.

=== 1989 popular insurgency and militancy ===
In the years since 1990, the Kashmiri Muslims and the Indian government have conspired to abolish the complexities of Kashmiri civilization. The world it inhabited has vanished: the state government and the political class, the rule of law, almost all the Hindu inhabitants of the valley, alcohol, cinemas, cricket matches, picnics by moonlight in the saffron fields, schools, universities, an independent press, tourists and banks. In this reduction of civilian reality, the sights of Kashmir are redefined: not the lakes and Mogul gardens, or the storied triumphs of Kashmiri agriculture, handicrafts and cookery, but two entities that confront each other without intermediary: the mosque and the army camp.

— British journalist James Buchan

In 1989, a widespread popular and armed insurgency started in Kashmir. After the 1987 state legislative assembly election, some of the results were disputed. This resulted in the formation of militant wings and marked the beginning of the Mujahadeen insurgency, which continues to this day. India contends that the insurgency was largely started by Afghan mujahadeen who entered the Kashmir valley following the end of the Soviet–Afghan War. Yasin Malik, a leader of one faction of the Jammu Kashmir Liberation Front (JKLF), was one of the Kashmiris to organise militancy in Kashmir, along with Ashfaq Majeed Wani, Javaid Ahmad Mir, and Abdul Hamid Sheikh. Since 1995, Malik has renounced the use of violence and calls for strictly peaceful methods to resolve the dispute. Malik developed differences with one of the senior leaders, Farooq Siddiqui (alias Farooq Papa), for shunning demands for an independent Kashmir and trying to cut a deal with the Indian Prime Minister. This resulted in a split in which Bitta Karate, Salim Nanhaji, and other senior comrades joined Farooq Papa. Pakistan claims these insurgents are Jammu and Kashmir citizens, and are rising up against the Indian army as part of an independence movement. Amnesty International has accused security forces in Indian-controlled Kashmir of exploiting an Armed Forces (Special Powers) Act that enables them to "hold prisoners without trial". The group argues that the law, which allows security forces to detain individuals for up to two years without presenting charges violates prisoners' human rights. In 2011, the state humans right commission said it had evidence that 2,156 bodies had been buried in 40 graves over the last 20 years. The authorities deny such accusations. The security forces say the unidentified dead are militants who may have originally come from outside India. They also say that many of the missing people have crossed into Pakistani-administered Kashmir to engage in militancy. However, according to the state human rights commission, among the identified bodies 574 were those of "disappeared locals", and according to Amnesty International's annual human rights report (2012) it was sufficient for "belying the security forces' claim that they were militants".

India claims these insurgents are Islamic terrorist groups from Pakistani-administered Kashmir and Afghanistan, fighting to make Jammu and Kashmir a part of Pakistan. Indian analysts and the JKLF have accused Pakistan of training and backing terrorists. India states that the terrorists have killed many citizens in Kashmir and committed human rights violations whilst denying that their own armed forces are responsible for human rights abuses. On a visit to Pakistan in 2006, former Chief Minister of Kashmir Omar Abdullah remarked that foreign militants were engaged in reckless killings and mayhem in the name of religion. Indian authorities said in 2008 and 2021 that militancy was on the decline.

The Pakistani government denies it supports terrorists, only saying it has supported "freedom fighters" in the past. In October 2008, President Asif Ali Zardari of Pakistan called the Kashmir separatists "terrorists" in an interview with The Wall Street Journal. These comments sparked outrage amongst many Kashmiris, some of whom defied a curfew imposed by the Indian army to burn him in effigy.

In 2008, pro-separatist leader Mirwaiz Umar Farooq told the Washington Post that there has been a "purely indigenous, purely Kashmiri" peaceful protest movement alongside the insurgency in Indian-administered Kashmir since 1989. The movement was created for the same reason as the insurgency and began after the disputed election of 1987. According to the United Nations, the Kashmiris have grievances with the Indian government, specifically the Indian military, which has committed human rights violations.

In 1994, the NGO International Commission of Jurists sent a fact finding mission to Kashmir. The ICJ mission concluded that the right of self-determination to which the peoples of Jammu and Kashmir became entitled as part of the process of partition had neither been exercised nor abandoned, and thus remained exercisable. It further stated that as the people of Kashmir had a right of self-determination, it followed that their insurgency was legitimate. It, however, did not follow that Pakistan had a right to provide support for the militants.

=== 1989–1990 exodus of Kashmir Pandits ===
Due to rising insurgency and Islamic militancy in the Kashmir Valley, Kashmiri Pandits were forced to flee the valley. They were targeted by militant groups such as the Jammu Kashmir Liberation Front, Lashkar-e-Taiba, and Jaish-e-Mohammed. On 4 January 1990, Srinagar based newspaper Aftab released a message, threatening all Hindus to leave Kashmir immediately, sourcing it to the militant organization Hizbul Mujahideen. In the preceding months, around 300 Hindu men and women, Kashmiri Pandits, had been slaughtered and women raped. Mosque released statement in loud speaker asked Hindus to leave Kashmir without their women. On 19 January 1990, Kashmiri Pandits fled from Kashmiri due to atrocities such as killing and gang rape.

On 21 January 1990, two days after Jagmohan took over as governor of Jammu and Kashmir, the Gawkadal massacre took place in Srinagar when the Indian paramilitary troops of the Central Reserve Police Force opened fire on a group of Kashmiri protesters in what has been described by some authors as "the worst massacre in Kashmiri history" (along with the Bijbehara Massacre in 1993). At least 50 people were killed, with some reports of the deaths reaching as high as 280. In the aftermath of the massacre, more demonstrations followed, and in January 1990, Indian paramilitary forces are believed to have killed around 300 protesters. As a Human Rights Watch stated in a report from May 1991, "In the weeks that followed [the Gawakadal massacre] as security forces fired on crowds of marchers and as militants intensified their attacks against the police and those suspected of aiding them, Kashmir's civil war began in earnest."

The mass exodus began on 1 March 1990, when hundreds of thousands of Kashmiri Pandits left the state; of the approximately 300,000 to 600,000 Hindus living in the Kashmir Valley in 1990, only 2,000–3,000 lived there in 2016.

=== 2000s Al-Qaeda involvement ===
In a 'Letter to American People' written by Osama bin Laden in 2002, he stated that one of the reasons he was fighting America was because of its support for India on the Kashmir issue. While on a trip to Delhi in 2002, US Secretary of Defense Donald Rumsfeld suggested that Al-Qaeda was active in Kashmir, though he did not have any hard evidence. An investigation by a Christian Science Monitor reporter in 2002 claimed to have unearthed evidence that Al-Qaeda and its affiliates were prospering in Pakistani-administered Kashmir with tacit approval of Pakistan's Inter-Services Intelligence agency (ISI). In 2002, a team comprising Special Air Service and Delta Force personnel was sent into Indian-administered Kashmir to hunt for Osama bin Laden after reports that he was being sheltered by the Kashmiri militant group Harkat-ul-Mujahideen. US officials believed that Al-Qaeda was helping organise a campaign of terror in Kashmir to provoke conflict between India and Pakistan. Their strategy was to force Pakistan to move its troops to the border with India, thereby relieving pressure on Al-Qaeda elements hiding in northwestern Pakistan. US intelligence analysts say Al-Qaeda and Taliban operatives in Pakistani-administered Kashmir are helping terrorists trained in Afghanistan to infiltrate Indian-administered Kashmir. Fazlur Rehman Khalil, the leader of the Harkat-ul-Mujahideen, signed al-Qaeda's 1998 declaration of holy war, which called on Muslims to attack all Americans and their allies. In 2006 Al-Qaeda claim they have established a wing in Kashmir, which worried the Indian government. Indian Army Lieutenant General H.S. Panag, GOC-in-C Northern Command, told reporters that the army has ruled out the presence of Al-Qaeda in Indian-administered Jammu and Kashmir. He said that there no evidence to verify media reports of an Al-Qaeda presence in the state. He ruled out Al-Qaeda ties with the militant groups in Kashmir including Lashkar-e-Taiba and Jaish-e-Mohammed. However, he stated that they had information about Al Qaeda's strong ties with Lashkar-e-Taiba and Jaish-e-Mohammed operations in Pakistan. While on a visit to Pakistan in January 2010, US Defense secretary Robert Gates stated that Al-Qaeda was seeking to destabilise the region and planning to provoke a nuclear war between India and Pakistan.

In June 2011, a US Drone strike killed Ilyas Kashmiri, chief of Harkat-ul-Jihad al-Islami, a Kashmiri militant group associated with Al-Qaeda. Kashmiri was described by Bruce Riedel as a 'prominent' Al-Qaeda member, while others described him as the head of military operations for Al-Qaeda. Waziristan had by then become the new battlefield for Kashmiri militants fighting NATO in support of Al-Qaeda. Ilyas Kashmiri was charged by the US in a plot against Jyllands-Posten, the Danish newspaper at the center of the Jyllands-Posten Muhammad cartoons controversy. In April 2012, Farman Ali Shinwari a former member of Kashmiri separatist groups Harkat-ul-Mujahideen and Harkat-ul-Jihad al-Islami, was appointed chief of al-Qaeda in Pakistan.

=== 2008–present ===
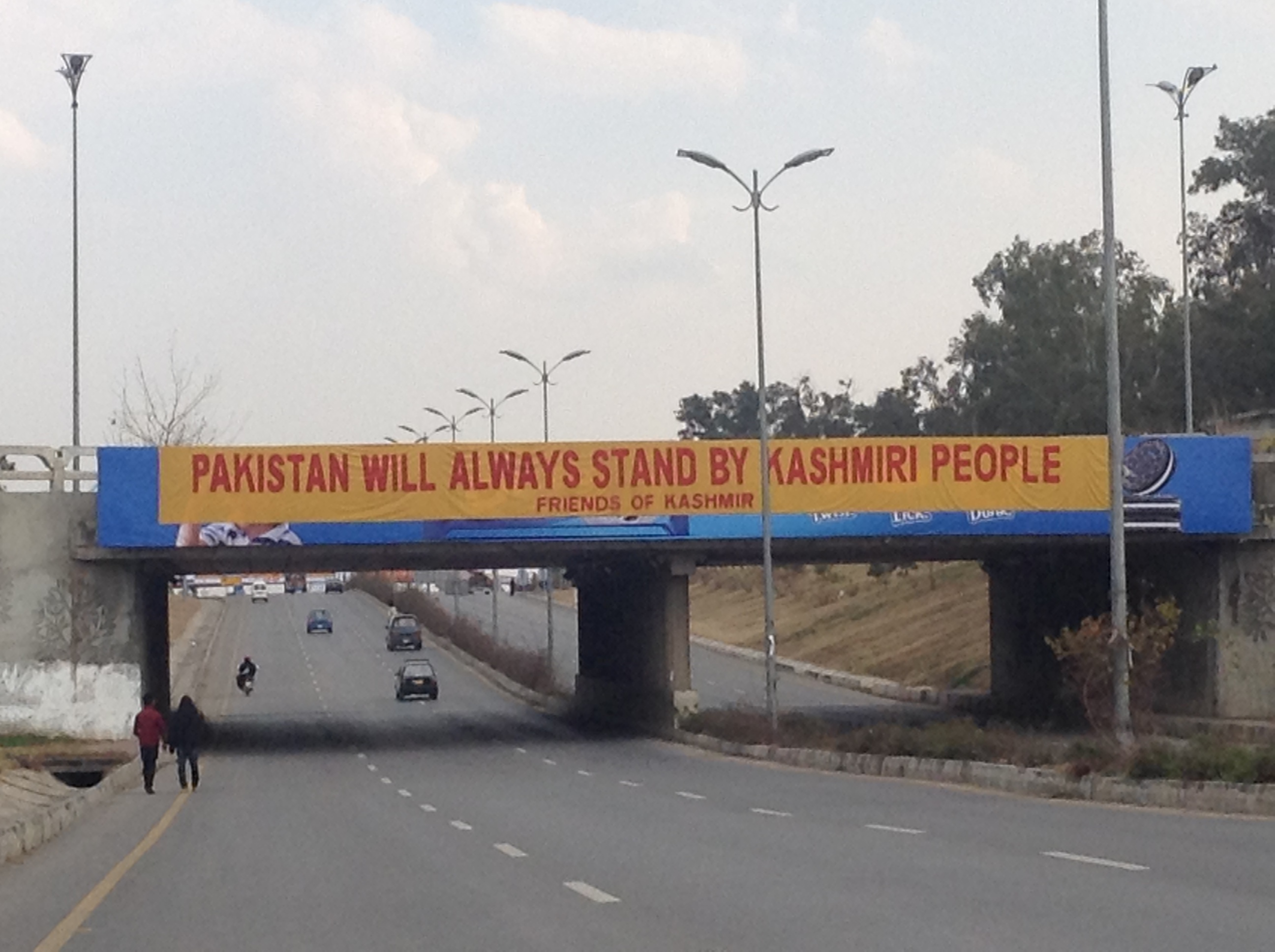
Kashmir Solidarity Day on every 5 February is observed in Pakistan. This banner was hung in Islamabad.

In March 2008, two separate incidents were reported in Indian-administered Kashmir- a blast near the civil secretariat and high court, and a gun battle between security forces and militants which left five dead. The gunfight began when security forces raided a house on the outskirts of the capital city of Srinagar housing militants. The Indian Army has been carrying out cordon-and-search operations against militants in Indian-administered Kashmir since the violence broke out in 1989.

Massive demonstrations followed a May 2008 decision of the state government of Jammu and Kashmir to transfer 100 acres (0.40 km^{2}) of land to a trust which runs the Hindu Amarnath shrine in the Muslim-majority Kashmir valley. This land was to be used to build a shelter to house Hindu pilgrims temporarily during their annual pilgrimage to the Amarnath temple. Indian security forces including the army responded quickly to keep order. More than 40 unarmed protesters were killed. The largest protests saw more than a half million people waving Pakistani flags and crying for freedom at a rally on 18 August, according to Time magazine. The situation drew international reactions from separatist leaders and the United Nations. Following the unrest in 2008, secessionist movements got a boost. Such demonstrations have been aloof of the fact that the India government very regularly undertakes activities to uplift the Muslim community and donates lands and other properties to the systemized Waqf Boards. Despite the protests, state elections in November–December 2008 in Indian administered Kashmir saw a high voter turnout of more than 60% of the total registered electors.

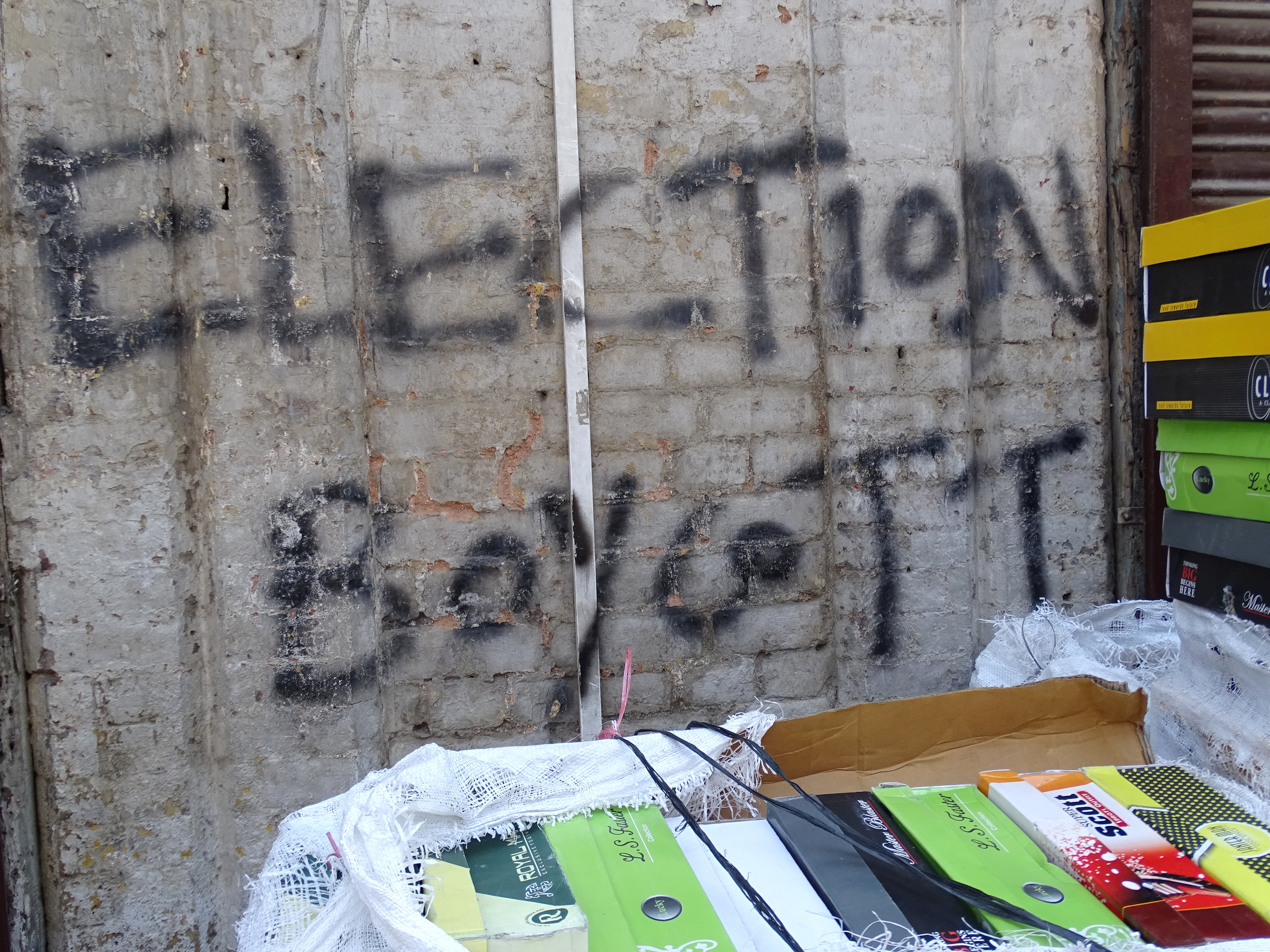
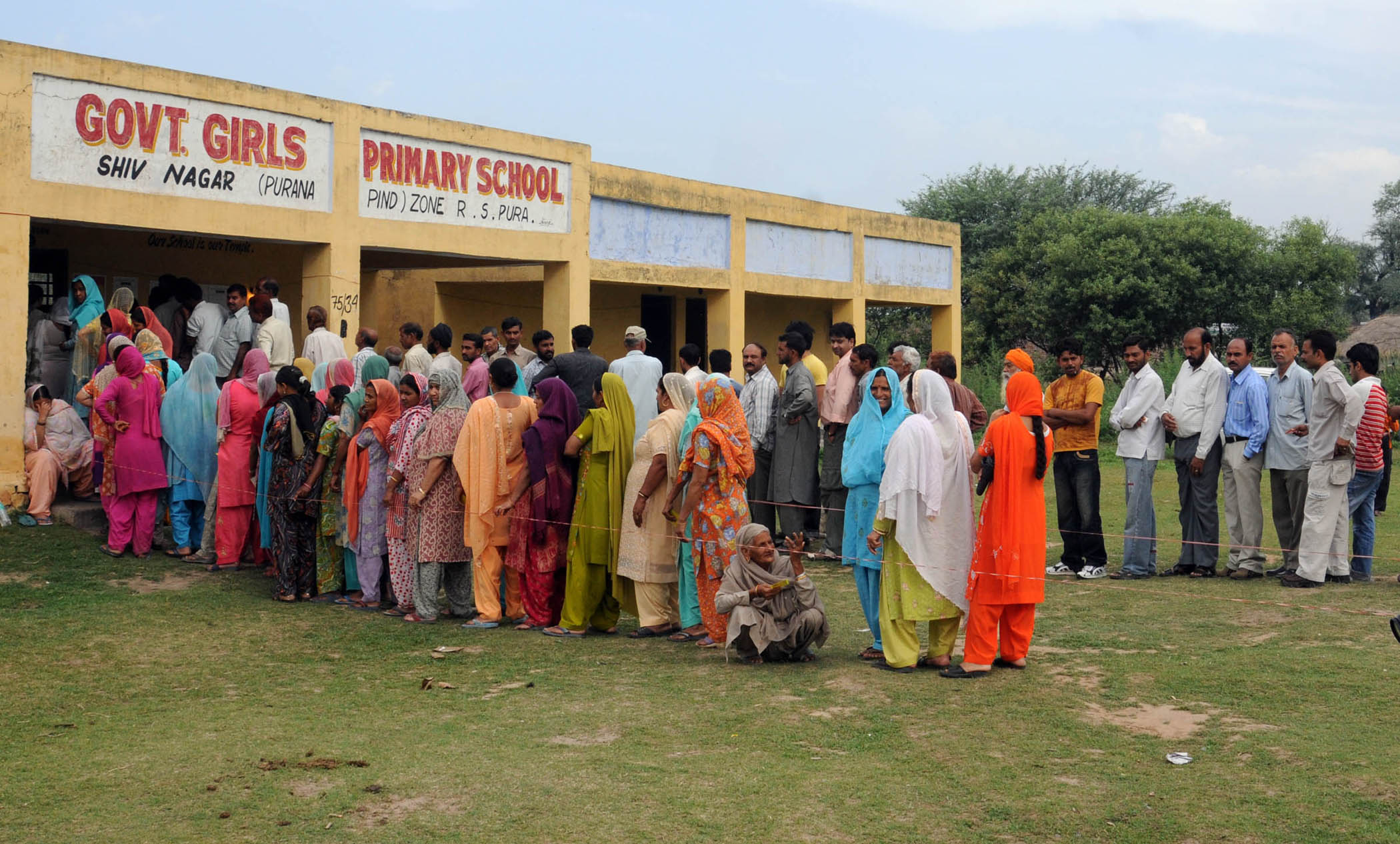
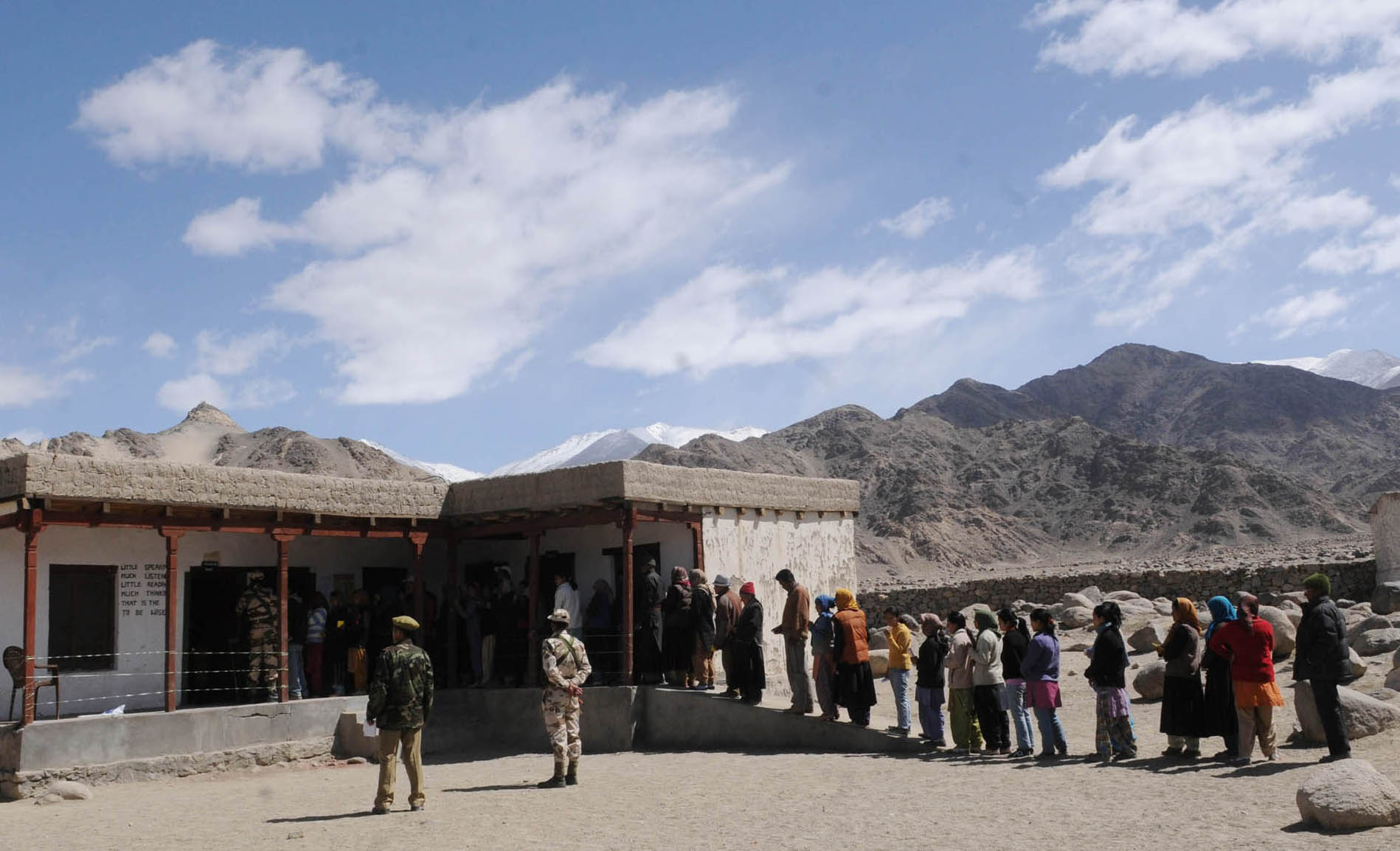
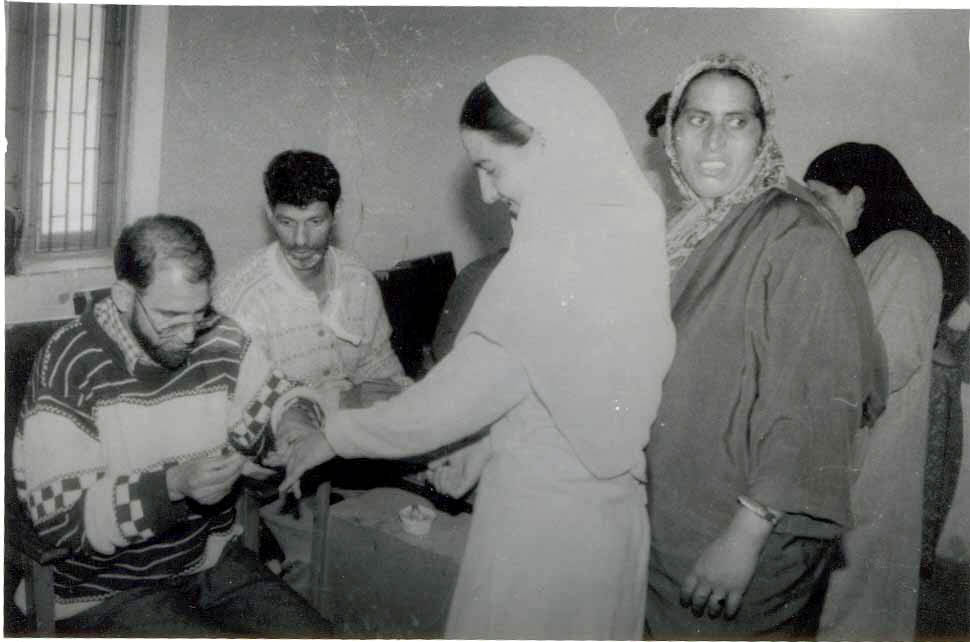
Visual of voters during parliamentary general elections being conducted in Indian-Jammu and Kashmir in 2004 and 2009. A boycott graffiti seen in Old City, Srinagar.

In 2009, protests started over the alleged rape and murder of two young women in Shopian in South Kashmir. The next summer again saw large-scale protests with the immediate trigger being a fake encounter staged by the military in Machil, Kupwara. This 2010 Kashmir unrest saw separatist sentiments, pro-independence slogans, protestors who defied curfews, attacked security forces with stones and burnt police vehicles and government buildings. Security forces in Jammu and Kashmir fired live ammunition on the protesters, resulting in 112 deaths. The protests subsided after the Indian government announced a package of measures aimed at defusing the tensions in September 2010.

Revelations made on 24 September 2013 by the former Indian army chief General V. K. Singh claim that the state politicians of Jammu and Kashmir are funded by the army secret service to keep the general public calm and that this activity has been going on since Partition.

In October 2014, Indian and Pakistani troops traded LOC gunfire – the small-arms and mortar exchanges – which Indian officials called the worst violation of a 2003 ceasefire – left soldiers and civilians dead. Thousands of people fled their homes on both sides after the violence erupted on 5 October.

The 2014 Jammu and Kashmir Legislative Assembly election was held from 25 November – 20 December. Despite repeated boycott calls by separatist Hurriyat leaders, elections recorded highest voters turnout in last 25 years, that is more than 65% which is more than usual voting percentage in other states of India. Phase wise voting percentage is as follows (table):

J & K 2014 assembly elections voters turnout
Voting phases	Date	Seats	Turnout
	25 November	15	71%
	2 December	18	71%
	9 December	16	59%
	14 December	18	49%
	20 December	20	76%
	Total	87	65%

The European Parliament welcomed the smooth conduct of the State Legislative Elections in the Jammu and Kashmir despite boycott calls. The EU in its message said, "The high voter turnout figure proves that democracy is firmly rooted in India. The EU would like to congratulate India and its democratic system for conduct of fair elections, unmarred by violence, in the state of Jammu and Kashmir".

On 8 July 2016, a militant leader Burhan Wani was cornered by the security forces and killed. Following his death, protests and demonstrations led to an "amplified instability" in the Kashmir valley. Curfews were imposed in all 10 districts of Kashmir, over 100 civilians died and over 17,000 were injured in clashes with the police. More than 600 have pellet injuries to the face. To prevent volatile rumours, cellphone and internet services were blocked, and newspapers were also restricted in many parts of the region.

An attack by four militants on an Indian Army base on 18 September 2016, also known as the 2016 Uri attack, resulted in the death of 19 soldiers as well as the militants themselves. Response took various forms, including the postponement of the 19th SAARC summit, asking the Russian government to call off a joint military exercise with Pakistan, and the 'Indian Motion Picture Producers Association' decision to suspend work with Pakistan. On the Pakistani side, military alertness was raised and some Pakistan International Airlines flights suspended. The Pakistani government denied any role and raised the issue of human rights violations by Indian security forces.

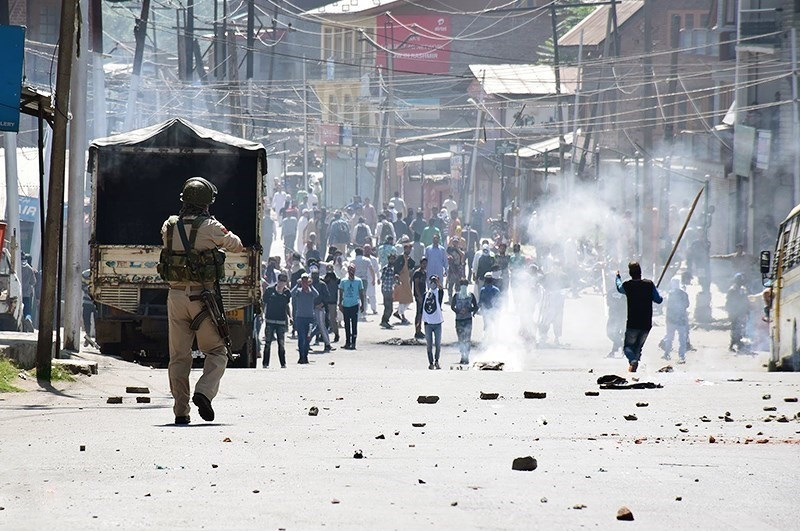
Indian police in Kashmir valley confronting violent protesters in December 2018

In the deadliest incident since 2016, Jaish-e-Mohammed (JEM) carried and claimed responsibility for a suicide bomb attack on a military convoy in Pulwama that killed over 40 Indian soldiers on 14 February 2019. In retaliation 12 Indian fighter jets dropped bombs on a "terrorist camp" in Pakistan-controlled territory of Kashmir, allegedly killing around 350 members in terrorist camps. As India trespassed Pakistan's air space, the incidents escalated the tension between India and Pakistan starting the 2019 India–Pakistan border standoff and skirmishes. On 22 March 2019, a peace offer was fixed, ending the hostilities, and with both countries agreeing to fight terrorism.

In August 2019, India revoked the special status of Jammu and Kashmir through Parliament, abolishing Article 370 and rendering the state Constitution infructuous. Further both houses of the Indian parliament passed a bill to reorganise the state into two union territories. This was followed by a strict preventive pre-emptive state lockdown, which lasted until 5 February 2021 (A preventative lockdown was put in place after the death of Syed Ali Shah Geelani for 2 to 5 days). LOC border clashes between November 2020 and February 2021 resulted in 24 deaths of both military personnel and civilians.

In April 2025, three suspected militants and an Indian army officer were killed in separate encounters in the Indian-controlled region. On 9 April, the Indian army engaged militants in Kishtwar district, resulting in the death of one militant, with two more killed in subsequent firefights. On 11 April, in the Akhnoor area, Indian soldiers intercepted militants attempting to infiltrate from Pakistan, leading to the death of an army officer. On 22 April, Islamist militants attacked a tourist spot in Pahalgam, causing the Indian government to attack alleged terrorist camps in Pakistan, as part of a four-day intense conflict the following May that ended in ceasefire.

== National stances ==
Administered by	Area	Population	% Muslim	% Hindu	% Buddhist	% Other
India	Kashmir Valley	~4 million	95%	4%	–	–
India	Jammu	~3 million	30%	66%	–	4%
India	Ladakh	~0.25 million	46%	–	50%	3%
Pakistan	Gilgit-Baltistan	~1 million	99%	–	–	–
Pakistan	Azad Kashmir	~2.6 million	100%	–	–	–
China	Aksai Chin	–	–	–	–	–
China	Shaksgam Valley	–	–	–	–	–
Statistics from the BBC report "In Depth"; 525,000 refugees from Indian-administered Kashmir migrated to Pakistan and Azad Kashmir in 1947–48.; 226,000 refugees from Pakistani-administered Kashmir migrated to India and Jammu and Kashmir in 1947 and 1948.; A minimum of 506,000 people in the Indian-administered Kashmir Valley are internally displaced due to militancy in Kashmir, about half of whom are Hindu pandits; Muslims form the majority in the Poonch, Rajouri, Kishtwar, and Doda districts of the Jammu region. Shia Muslims make up the majority in the Kargil district in the Ladakh region.; India does not accept the two-nation theory and considers that Kashmir, despite being a Muslim-majority region, is in many ways an "integral part" of secular India.

=== Indian view ===
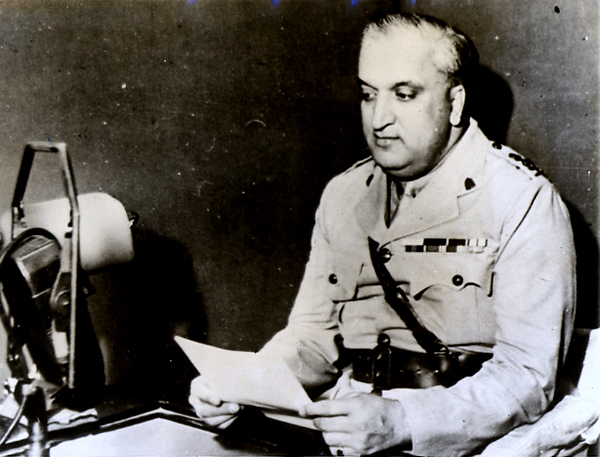
Maharaja Hari Singh signed the Instrument of Accession in October 1947 under which he acceded the State of Jammu and Kashmir to the Union of India.

Map showing disputed territories of India

India has officially stated that it believes Kashmir to be an integral part of India, though the then Prime Minister of India, Manmohan Singh, stated after the 2010 Kashmir Unrest that his government was willing to grant autonomy to the region within the purview of the Indian constitution if there was consensus among political parties on this issue. The Indian viewpoint is succinctly summarised by the Indian Ministry of External affairs. —

- India holds that the Instrument of Accession of the State of Jammu and Kashmir to the Union of India, signed by Maharaja Hari Singh (erstwhile ruler of the State) on 25 October 1947 and executed on 27 October 1947 between the ruler of Kashmir and the Governor General of India was a legal act and completely valid in terms of the Government of India Act (1935), Indian Independence Act (1947) as well as under international law and as such was total and irrevocable.
- The Constituent assembly of Jammu and Kashmir had unanimously ratified the Maharaja's Instrument of Accession to India and adopted a constitution for the state that called for a perpetual merger of Jammu and Kashmir with the Union of India. India claims that the constituent assembly was a representative one, and that its views were those of the Kashmiri people at the time.
- United Nations Security Council Resolution 1172 tacitly accepts India's stand regarding all outstanding issues between India and Pakistan and urges the need to resolve the dispute through mutual dialogue without the need for a plebiscite in the framework of UN Charter.
- United Nations Security Council Resolution 47 cannot be implemented since Pakistan failed to withdraw its forces from Kashmir, which was the first step in implementing the resolution. India is also of the view that Resolution 47 is obsolete, since the geography and demographics of the region have permanently altered since it adoption. The resolution was passed by United Nations Security Council under Chapter VI of the United Nations Charter and as such is non-binding with no mandatory enforceability, as opposed to resolutions passed under Chapter VII.
- India does not accept the two-nation theory that forms the basis of Pakistan's claims and considers that Kashmir, despite being a Muslim-majority region, is in many ways an "integral part" of secular India.
- The state of Jammu and Kashmir was provided with significant autonomy under Article 370 of the Constitution of India.
- All differences between India and Pakistan, including Kashmir, need to be settled through bilateral negotiations as agreed to by the two countries under the Simla Agreement signed on 2 July 1972.

Additional Indian viewpoints regarding the broader debate over the Kashmir conflict include:

- In a diverse country like India, disaffection and discontent are not uncommon. Indian democracy has the necessary resilience to accommodate genuine grievances within the framework of India's sovereignty, unity, and integrity. The Government of India has expressed its willingness to accommodate the legitimate political demands of the people of the state of Kashmir.
- Insurgency and terrorism in Kashmir is deliberately fuelled by Pakistan to create instability in the region. The Government of India has repeatedly accused Pakistan of waging a proxy war in Kashmir by providing weapons and financial assistance to terrorist groups in the region.
- Pakistan is trying to raise anti-India sentiment among the people of Kashmir by spreading false propaganda against India. According to the state government of Jammu and Kashmir, Pakistani radio and television channels deliberately spread "hate and venom" against India to alter Kashmiri opinion.
- India has asked the United Nations not to leave unchallenged or unaddressed the claims of moral, political, and diplomatic support for terrorism, which were clearly in contravention of United Nations Security Council Resolution 1373. This is a Chapter VII resolution that makes it mandatory for member states to not provide active or passive support to terrorist organisations. Specifically, it has pointed out that the Pakistani government continues to support various terrorist organisations, such as Jaish-e-Mohammad and Lashkar-e-Taiba, in direct violation of this resolution.
- India points out reports by human rights organisations condemning Pakistan for the lack of civic liberties in Pakistani-administered Kashmir. According to India, most regions of Pakistani Kashmir, especially Northern Areas, continue to suffer from lack of political recognition, economic development, and basic fundamental rights.
- Karan Singh, the son of the last ruler of the princely state of Kashmir and Jammu, has said that the Instrument of Accession signed by his father was the same as signed by other states. He opined that Kashmir was therefore a part of India, and that its special status granted by Article 370 of the Indian Constitution stemmed from the fact that it had its own constitution.

According to a poll in an Indian newspaper Indians were keener to keep control of Kashmir than Pakistanis. 67% of urban Indians want New Delhi to be in full control of Kashmir.

Michigan State University scholar Baljit Singh, interviewing Indian foreign policy experts in 1965, found that 77 percent of them favoured discussions with Pakistan on all outstanding problems including the Kashmir dispute. However, only 17 percent were supportive of holding a plebiscite in Kashmir. The remaining 60 percent were pessimistic of a solution due to a distrust of Pakistan or a perception of threats to India's internal institutions. They contended that India's secularism was far from stable and the possibility of Kashmir separating from India or joining Pakistan would endanger Hindu–Muslim relations in India.

In 2008, the death toll from the last 20 years was estimated by Indian authorities to be over 47,000.

In 2017 India's Union Home Minister, Rajnath Singh, demanded that Pakistan desist from demanding a plebiscite in Jammu and Kashmir, saying: "If at all a referendum is required, it is needed in Pakistan, where people should be asked whether they want to continue in Pakistan or are demanding the country's merger with India".

=== Pakistani view ===
Pakistan maintains that Kashmir is the "jugular vein of Pakistan" and a currently disputed territory whose final status must be determined by the people of Kashmir. Pakistan's claims to the disputed region are based on the rejection of Indian claims to Kashmir, namely the Instrument of Accession. Pakistan insists that the Maharaja was not a popular leader, and was regarded as a tyrant by most Kashmiris. Pakistan maintains that the Maharaja used brute force to suppress the population.

Pakistan claims that Indian forces were in Kashmir before the Instrument of Accession was signed with India, and that therefore Indian troops were in Kashmir in violation of the Standstill Agreement, which was designed to maintain the status quo in Kashmir (although India was not signatory to the Agreement, which was signed between Pakistan and the Hindu ruler of Jammu and Kashmir).

From 1990 to 1999, some organisations reported that the Indian Armed Forces, its paramilitary groups, and counter-insurgent militias were responsible for the deaths of 4,501 Kashmiri civilians. During the same period, there were records of 4,242 women between the ages of 7–70 being raped. Similar allegations were also made by some human rights organisations.

In short, Pakistan holds that:

- The popular Kashmiri insurgency demonstrates that the Kashmiri people no longer wish to remain within India. Pakistan suggests that this means that Kashmir either wants to be with Pakistan or independent.
- According to the two-nation theory, one of the principles that is cited for the partition that created India and Pakistan, Kashmir should have been with Pakistan, because it has a Muslim majority.
- India has shown disregard for the resolutions of the UN Security Council and the United Nations Commission in India and Pakistan by failing to hold a plebiscite to determine the future allegiance of the state.
- The reason for India's disregard of the resolutions of the UN Security Council was given by India's Defense Minister, Kirshnan Menon, who said: "Kashmir would vote to join Pakistan and no Indian Government responsible for agreeing to plebiscite would survive."
- Pakistan was of the view that the Maharaja of Kashmir had no right to call in the Indian Army, because it held that the Maharaja of Kashmir was not a hereditary ruler and was merely a British appointee, after the British defeated Ranjit Singh who ruled the area before the British conquest.
- Pakistan has noted the widespread use of extrajudicial killings in Indian-administered Kashmir carried out by Indian security forces while claiming they were caught up in encounters with militants. These encounters are commonplace in Indian-administered Kashmir. The encounters go largely uninvestigated by the authorities, and the perpetrators are spared criminal prosecution.
- Pakistan disputes claims by India with reference to the Simla Agreement that UN resolutions on Kashmir have lost their relevance. It argues that legally and politically, UN Resolutions cannot be superseded without the UN Security Council adopting a resolution to that effect. It also maintains the Simla Agreement emphasised exploring a peaceful bilateral outcome, without excluding the role of UN and other negotiations. This is based on its interpretation of Article 1(i) stating "the principles and purposes of the Charter of the United Nations shall govern the relations between the two countries".

Human rights organisations have strongly condemned Indian troops for widespread rape and murder of innocent civilians while accusing these civilians of being militants.

- The Chenab formula was a compromise proposed in the 1960s, in which the Kashmir valley and other Muslim-dominated areas north of the Chenab river would go to Pakistan, and Jammu and other Hindu-dominated regions would go to India.

A poll by an Indian newspaper shows 48% of Pakistanis want Islamabad "to take full control" of Kashmir, while 47% of Pakistanis support Kashmiri independence.

Former Pakistani President General Pervez Musharraf on 16 October 2014 said that Pakistan needs to incite those fighting in Kashmir, "We have source (in Kashmir) besides the (Pakistan) army…People in Kashmir are fighting against (India). We just need to incite them," Musharraf told a TV channel.

In 2015 Pakistan's outgoing National Security Advisor Sartaj Aziz said that Pakistan wished to have third party mediation on Kashmir, but it was unlikely to happen unless by international pressure. "Under Shimla Accord it was decided that India and Pakistan would resolve their disputes bilaterally," Aziz said. "Such bilateral talks have not yielded any results for the last 40 years. So then what is the solution?"

=== Chinese view ===
China has generally supported Pakistan against India on Kashmir. China has also stated that Aksai Chin is an integral part of China and does not recognise its inclusion in the Kashmir region. It also disputes the region's boundary with Tibet at various locations.

- China did not accept the boundaries of the princely state of Kashmir and Jammu, north of Aksai Chin and the Karakoram as proposed by the British.
- China settled its border disputes with Pakistan under the 1963 Sino-Pakistan Agreement on the Trans-Karakoram Tract with the provision that the settlement was subject to the final solution of the Kashmir dispute.

=== Kashmiri views ===
- Scholar Andrew Whitehead states that Kashmiris view Kashmir as having been ruled by their own in 1586. Since then, they believe, it has been ruled in succession by the Mughals, Afghans, Sikhs, Dogras and, lately, the Indian government. Whitehead states that this is only partly true: the Mughals lavished much affection and resources on Kashmir, the Dogras made Srinagar their capital next only to their native Jammu city, and through much of the post-independence India, Kashmiri Muslims headed the state government. According to Whitehead, Kashmiris bear an 'acute sense of grievance' that they were not in control of their own fate for centuries.
- A. G. Noorani, a constitutional expert, says the people of Kashmir are 'very much' a party to the dispute.
- According to an opinion poll conducted by Centre for the Study of Developing Societies in 2007, 87% of people in mainly Muslim Srinagar want independence, whereas 95% of the people in the mainly Hindu Jammu city think the state should be part of India. The Kashmir Valley is the only region of the former princely state where the majority of the population is unhappy with its current status. The Hindus of Jammu and Buddhists of Ladakh are content under Indian administration. Muslims of Azad Kashmir and Northern Areas are content under Pakistani administration. Kashmir Valley's Muslims want to change their national status to independence.
- Scholar A.G. Noorani testifies that Kashmiris want a plebiscite to achieve freedom. Zutshi states the people of Poonch and Gilgit may have had a chance to determine their future but the Kashmiri was lost in the process.
- Since the 1947 accession of Kashmir to India was provisional and conditional on the wishes of the people, the Kashmiris' right to determine their future was recognised. Noorani notes that state elections do not satisfy this requirement.
- Kashmiris assert that except for 1977 and 1983 elections, no state election has been fair. According to scholar Sumantra Bose, India was determined to stop fair elections since that would have meant that elections would be won by those unfriendly to India.
- The Kashmiri people have still not been able to exercise the right to self-determination and this was the conclusion of the International Commission of Jurists in 1994.
- Ayesha Parvez writes in The Hindu that high voter turnout in Kashmir cannot be interpreted as a sign of acceptance of Indian rule. Voters vote due to varying factors such as development, effective local governance and economy.
- The Hurriyat parties do not want to participate in elections under the framework of the Indian Constitution. Elections held by India are seen as a diversion from the main issue of self-determination.
- Kashmiri opponents to Indian rule maintain that India has stationed 600,000 Indian troops in what is the highest ratio of troops to civilian density in the world.
- Kashmiri scholars say that India's military occupation inflicts violence and humiliation on Kashmiris. Indian forces are responsible for human rights abuses and terror against the local population and have killed tens of thousands of civilians. India's state forces have used rape as a cultural weapon of war against Kashmiris and rape has extraordinarily high incidence in Kashmir as compared to other conflict zones of the world. Militants are also guilty of crimes but their crimes cannot be compared with the scale of abuses by Indian forces for which justice is yet to be delivered.
- Kashmiri scholars say that India's reneging on promise of plebiscite, violations of constitutional provisions of Kashmir's autonomy and subversion of the democratic process led to the rebellion of 1989–1990.
- According to historian Mridu Rai, the majority of Kashmiri Muslims believe they are scarcely better off under Indian rule than the 101 years of Dogra rule.
- Markandey Katju, an ethnic Kashmiri and former Justice of the Supreme Court of India, maintains that the secession of Kashmir would cause its economy to suffer, due to the fact that Kashmir's handicraft industry is dependent on buyers in other parts of India; Katju holds that the ultimate solution to the Kashmir conflict is the reunification of what is now Pakistan with India under a secular government.
- According to lawyer and human rights activist K. Balagopal, Kashmiris have a distinct sense of identity and this identity is certainly not irreligious, as Islam is very much a part of the identity that Kashmiris feel strongly for. He opined that if only non-religious identities deserve support, then no national self-determination movement can be supported, because there is no national identity – at least in the Third World – devoid of the religious dimension. Balagopal says that if India and Pakistan cannot guarantee existence and peaceful development of independent Kashmir then Kashmiris may well choose Pakistan because of religious affinity and social and economic links. But if both can guarantee existence and peaceful development then most Kashmiris would prefer independent Kashmir.

=== Water dispute ===
In 1948, Eugene Black, then executive director of the World Bank, offered his services to solve the tension over water control. In the early days of independence, the fact that India was able to shut off the Central Bari Doab Canals at the time of the sowing season, causing significant damage to Pakistan's crops. Nevertheless, military and political clashes over Kashmir in the early years of independence appear to have been more about ideology and sovereignty rather than over the sharing of water resources. However, the minister of Pakistan has stated the opposite.

The Indus Waters Treaty was signed by both countries in September 1960, giving exclusive rights over the three western rivers of the Indus river system (Jhelum, Chenab and Indus) to Pakistan, and over the three eastern rivers (Sutlej, Ravi and Beas) to India, as long as this does not reduce or delay the supply to Pakistan. India therefore maintains that they are not willing to break the established regulations and they see no more problems with this issue.

== Efforts to end the dispute ==
There has been little meaningful dialogue to end the long-standing conflict. As of 2024, India holds the territorially advantageous position. Proposed solutions include independence for Kashmir, formal partition between India and Pakistan, and greater autonomy for the states of Azad Kashmir and Jammu and Kashmir.

=== Settlement formulas ===
==== Rajaji-Abdullah formula ====
The Rajaji-Abdullah formula, named after C. Rajagopalachari and Sheikh Abdullah, also simply called the Rajaji formula, was in Abdullah's words "an honourable solution which would not give a sense of victory either to India or Pakistan and at the same time would ensure a place of honour to the people of Kashmir". The discussions in 1964 covered numerous options, a plebiscite, status quo, further division etc., however seemed to point towards a condominium, a shared government, a confederation and a United Nations trust territory. Abdullah would act as the mediator between India and Pakistan. While the exact nature of the proposed settlement was never made public, Ayub Khan would go on to write in his autobiography that the proposal was "absurd".

==== Chenab formula ====
In 2005, General Musharraf, as well as other Pakistani leaders, sought to resolve the Kashmir issue through the Chenab formula road map. Borrowing a term used by Owen Dixon, Musharraf's Chenab Formula assigns Ladakh to India, Gilgit-Baltistan (G-B) to Pakistan, proposes a plebiscite in the Kashmir Valley and splits Jammu into two-halves. On 5 December 2006, Pakistani President Pervez Musharraf told an Indian TV channel that Pakistan would give up its claim on Kashmir if India accepted some of his peace proposals, including a phased withdrawal of troops, self-governance for locals, no changes in the borders of Kashmir, and a joint supervision mechanism involving India, Pakistan, and Kashmir. Musharraf stated that he was ready to give up the United Nations' resolutions regarding Kashmir.

Later, the government of Pakistan said that this was Musharraf's personal opinion. However Satinder Lambah, India's special envoy to Pakistan, says that while talks reduced due to the Mumbai attacks, the formula was not disowned.

=== Contemporary views on UN resolutions ===
Many neutral parties to the dispute have noted that the UN resolution on Kashmir is no longer relevant. The European Union holds the view that the plebiscite is not in Kashmiris' interest. The report notes that the UN conditions for such a plebiscite have not been, and can no longer be, met by Pakistan. The Hurriyat Conference observed in 2003 that a "plebiscite [is] no longer an option".

A 2002 Market and Opinion Research International (MORI) survey, on the basis of 850 interviews, found that within Indian-administered Kashmir, 61% of respondents said they felt they would be better off as Indian citizens, with 33% saying that they did not know, and the remaining 6% favouring Pakistani citizenship. However, this support for India was mainly in the Ladakh and Jammu regions, not the Kashmir Valley, where only 9% of the respondents said that they would be better off with India.

According to a 2007 poll conducted by the Centre for the Study of Developing Societies in New Delhi involving around 400 people, 87% of respondents in the Kashmir Valley prefer independence over union with India or Pakistan. A survey by Chatham House, on the basis of 3,774 face-to face interviews in Indian administered Jammu and Kashmir and Pakistan administered Azad Kashmir, (Note: Gilgit Baltistan was not included in the survey) found that support for independence stood at 43% and 44% respectively.

== Pakistan's relation with militants ==
In a 2001 commentary entitled Pakistan's Role in the Kashmir Insurgency in Jane's Intelligence Review, the author noted that "the nature of the Kashmir conflict has been transformed from what was originally a secular, locally based struggle (conducted via the Jammu Kashmir Liberation Front – JKLF) to one that is now largely carried out by foreign militants and rationalized in pan-Islamic religious terms." The majority of militant organisations are composed of foreign mercenaries, mostly from the Pakistani Punjab.

In 2010, with the support of its intelligence agencies, Pakistan again 'boosted' Kashmir militants, and recruitment of mujahideen in the Pakistani state of Punjab has increased.

In 2011, the FBI revealed that Pakistan's spy agency ISI paid millions of dollars into a United States–based non-governmental organisation to influence politicians and opinion-makers on the Kashmir issue and arrested Syed Ghulam Nabi Fai.

Some political analysts say that the Pakistan state policy shift and mellowing of its aggressive stance may have to do with its total failure in the Kargil War and the subsequent 9/11 attacks. These events put pressure on Pakistan to alter its position on terrorism.

Former President of Pakistan and the ex-chief of the Pakistan military Pervez Musharraf, stated in an interview in London, that the Pakistani government indeed helped to form underground militant groups and "turned a blind eye" towards their existence because they wanted India to discuss Kashmir.

According to former Indian Prime-minister Manmohan Singh, one of the main reasons behind the conflict was Pakistan's "terror-induced coercion". He further stated at a Joint Press Conference with United States President Barack Obama in New Delhi that India is not afraid of resolving all the issues with Pakistan including that of Kashmir "but it is our request that you cannot simultaneously be talking and at the same time the terror machine is as active as ever before. Once Pakistan moves away from this terror-induced coercion, we will be very happy to engage productively with Pakistan to resolve all outstanding issues."

In 2009, the President of Pakistan Asif Zardari asserted at a conference in Islamabad that Pakistan had indeed created Islamic militant groups as a strategic tool for use in its geostrategic agenda and "to attack Indian forces in Jammu and Kashmir". Former president of Pakistan and the ex-chief of the Pakistan military Pervez Musharraf also stated in an interview that Pakistani government helped to form underground militant groups to fight against Indian troops in Jammu and Kashmir and "turned a blind eye" towards their existence because they wanted India to discuss Kashmir. The British Government have formally accepted that there is a clear connection between Pakistan's Inter-Services Intelligence (ISI) and three major militant outfits operating in Jammu and Kashmir, Lashkar-e-Tayiba, Jaish-e-Mohammed and Harkat-ul-Mujahideen. The militants are provided with "weapons, training, advice and planning assistance" in Punjab and Kashmir by the ISI which is "coordinating the shipment of arms from the Pakistani side of Kashmir to the Indian side, where Muslim insurgents are waging a protracted war".

Throughout the 1990s, the ISI maintained its relationship with extremist networks and militants that it had established during the Afghan war to utilise in its campaign against Indian forces in Kashmir. Joint Intelligence/North (JIN) has been accused of conducting operations in Jammu and Kashmir and also Afghanistan. The Joint Signal Intelligence Bureau (JSIB) provide communications support to groups in Kashmir. According to Daniel Benjamin and Steven Simon, both former members of the National Security Council, the ISI acted as a "kind of terrorist conveyor belt" radicalising young men in the Madrassas of Pakistan and delivering them to training camps affiliated with or run by Al-Qaeda and from there moving them into Jammu and Kashmir to launch attacks.

Reportedly, about Rs. 24 million are paid out per month by the ISI to fund its activities in Jammu and Kashmir. Pro-Pakistani groups were reportedly favoured over other militant groups. Creation of six militant groups in Kashmir, which included Lashkar-e-Taiba (LeT), was aided by the ISI. According to American Intelligence officials, ISI is still providing protection and help to LeT. The Pakistan Army and ISI also LeT volunteers to surreptitiously penetrate from Pakistan Administrated Kashmir to Jammu and Kashmir.

In the past, Indian authorities have alleged several times that Pakistan has been involved in training and arming underground militant groups to fight Indian forces in Kashmir.

== Human rights abuses ==
In the Freedom in the World 2025 report, Indian-administered Kashmir was categorized as "partly-free", while Pakistani-administered Kashmir was categorized as "not free". India and Pakistan themselves were both categorized as "partly free".

=== Indian administered Kashmir ===
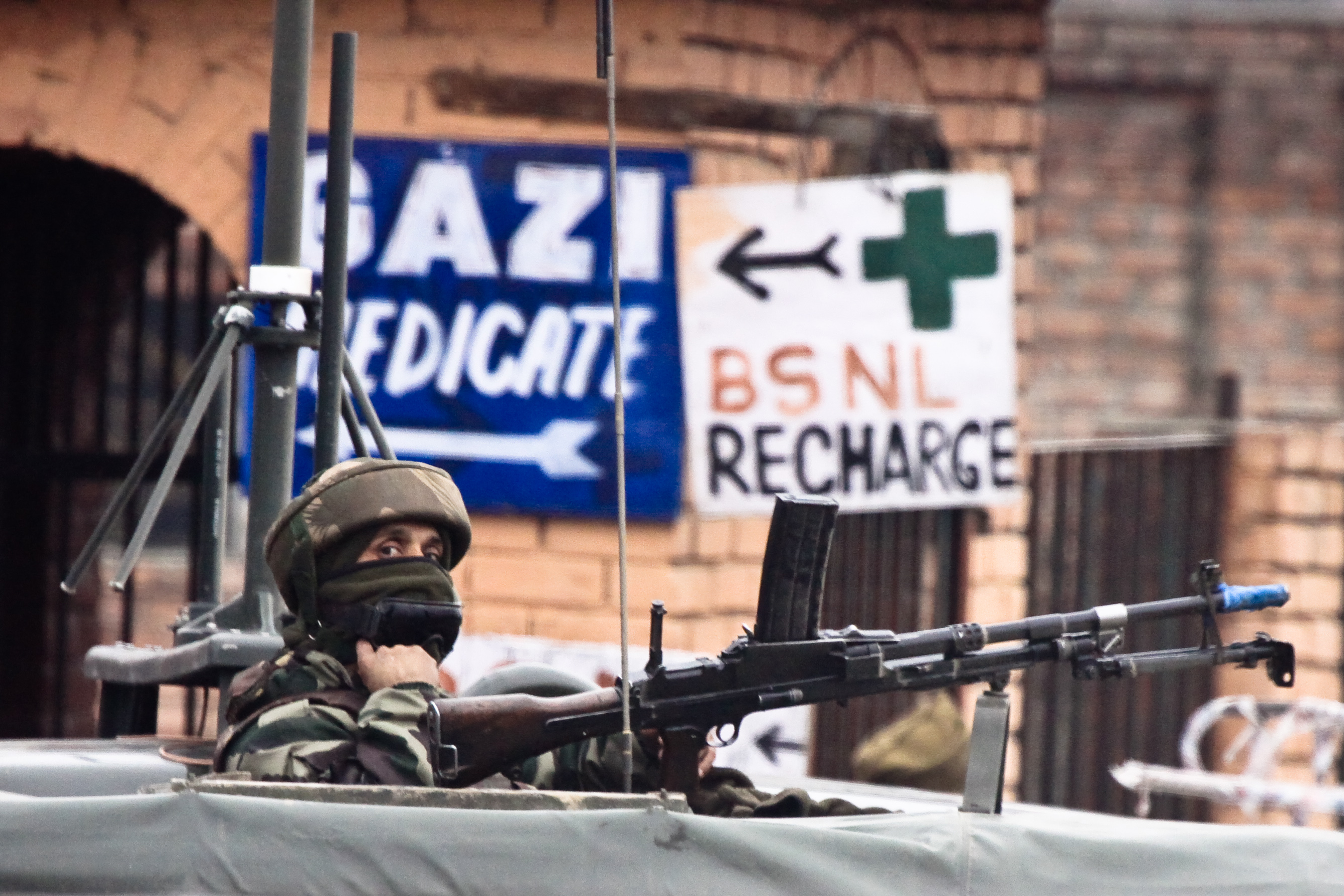
A soldier guards the roadside checkpoint outside Srinagar International Airport in January 2009.

Crimes by state forces are done inside Kashmir Valley which is the location of the present conflict.

The 2010 Chatham House opinion poll of the people of Indian administered Jammu and Kashmir found that overall concern, in the entire state, over human rights abuses was 43%. In the surveyed districts of the Muslim majority Kashmir Valley, where the desire for Independence is strongest, there was a high rate of concern over human rights abuses. (88% in Baramulla, 87% in Srinagar, 73% in Anantnag and 55% in Badgam). However, in the Hindu and Buddhist majority areas of the state, where pro-India sentiment is extremely strong, concern over human rights abuses was low (only 3% in Jammu expressed concerns over human rights abuses).

Several international agencies and the UN have reported human rights violations in Indian-administered Kashmir. In a 2008 press release the OHCHR spokesmen stated "The Office of the High Commissioner for Human Rights is concerned about the recent violent protests in Indian-administered Kashmir that have reportedly led to civilian casualties as well as restrictions to the right to freedom of assembly and expression." A 1996 Human Rights Watch report accuses the Indian military and Indian-government backed paramilitaries of "committ[ing] serious and widespread human rights violations in Kashmir." Jammu and Kashmir Coalition of Civil Society labels the happenings in Kashmir as war crimes and genocide and have issued a statement that those responsible should be tried in court of law. Some of the massacres by security forces include Gawakadal massacre, Zakoora and Tengpora massacre and Handwara massacre. Another such alleged massacre occurred on 6 January 1993 in the town of Sopore. TIME magazine described the incident as such: "In retaliation for the killing of one soldier, paramilitary forces rampaged through Sopore's market, setting buildings ablaze and shooting bystanders. The Indian government pronounced the event 'unfortunate' and claimed that an ammunition dump had been hit by gunfire, setting off fires that killed most of the victims." A state government inquiry into 22 October 1993 Bijbehara killings, in which the Indian military fired on a procession and killed 40 people and injured 150, found out that the firing by the forces was 'unprovoked' and the claim of the military that it was in retaliation was 'concocted and baseless'. However, the accused are still to be punished. In its report of September 2006, Human Rights Watch stated:

Indian security forces claim they are fighting to protect Kashmiris from militants and Islamic extremists, while militants claim they are fighting for Kashmiri independence and to defend Muslim Kashmiris from an abusive Indian army. In reality, both sides have committed widespread and numerous human rights abuses and violations of international humanitarian law (or the laws of war).

Many human rights organisations such as Amnesty International and Human Rights Watch (HRW) have condemned human rights abuses in Kashmir by Indians such as "extra-judicial executions", "disappearances", and torture. Bans on religious gatherings are also reportedly enforced. The "Armed Forces Special Powers Act" grants the military, wide powers of arrest, the right to shoot to kill, and to occupy or destroy property in counterinsurgency operations. Indian officials claim that troops need such powers because the army is only deployed when national security is at serious risk from armed combatants. Such circumstances, they say, call for extraordinary measures. Human rights organisations have also asked the Indian government to repeal the Public Safety Act, since "a detainee may be held in administrative detention for a maximum of two years without a court order." A 2008 report by the United Nations High Commissioner for Refugees determined that Indian Administered Kashmir was only 'partly free'. A recent report by Amnesty International stated that up to 20,000 people have been detained under a law called AFSPA in Indian-administered Kashmir.

Some human rights organisations have alleged that Indian Security forces have killed hundreds of Kashmiris through the indiscriminate use of force and torture, firing on demonstrations, custodial killings, encounters and detentions. The government of India denied that torture was widespread and stated that some custodial crimes may have taken place but that "these are few and far between". According to cables leaked by the WikiLeaks website, US diplomats in 2005 were informed by the International Committee of the Red Cross (ICRC) about the use of torture and sexual humiliation against hundreds of Kashmiri detainees by the security forces. The cable said Indian security forces relied on torture for confessions and that the human right abuses are believed to be condoned by the Indian government. SHRC also accused Indian army of forced labour.

There have been claims of disappearances by the police or the army in Kashmir by several human rights organisations. Human rights groups in Kashmir have documented more than three hundred cases of "disappearances" since 1990 but lawyers believe the number to be far higher because many relatives of disappeared people fear reprisal if they contact a lawyer. In 2016 Jammu and Kashmir Coalition of Civil Society said there are more than 8000 forced disappearances. State Human Rights Commission (SHRC) has found 2,730 bodies buried into unmarked graves, scattered in three districts — Bandipora, Baramulla, and Kupwara — of North Kashmir, believed to contain the remains of victims of unlawful killings and enforced disappearances by Indian security forces. SHRC stated that about 574 of these bodies have already been identified as those of disappeared locals. In 2012, the Jammu and Kashmir State government stripped its State Information Commission (SIC) department of most powers after the commission asked the government to disclose information about the unmarked graves. This state action was reportedly denounced by the former National Chief Information Commissioner. Amnesty International has called on India to "unequivocally condemn enforced disappearances" and to ensure that impartial investigations are conducted into mass graves in its Kashmir region. The Indian state police confirms as many as 331 deaths while in custody and 111 enforced disappearances since 1989. A report from the Indian Central Bureau of Investigation (CBI) claimed that the seven people killed in 2000 by the Indian military, were innocent civilians. The Indian Army has decided to try the accused in the General Court Martial. It was also reported that the killings that were allegedly committed in "cold-blood" by the Army, were actually in retaliation for the murder of 36 civilians [Sikhs] by militants at Chattisingpora in 2000. The official stance of the Indian Army was that, according to its own investigation, 97% of the reports about human rights abuses have been found to be "fake or motivated". However, there have been at least one case where civilians have been killed in 'fake encounters' by Indian army personnel for cash rewards. According to a report by Human Rights Watch:

Indian security forces have assaulted civilians during search operations, tortured and summarily executed detainees in custody and murdered civilians in reprisal attacks. Rape most often occurs during crackdowns, cordon-and-search operations during which men are held for identification in parks or schoolyards while security forces search their homes. In these situations, the security forces frequently engage in collective punishment against the civilian population, most frequently by beating or otherwise assaulting residents, and burning their homes. Rape is used as a means of targetting women whom the security forces accuse of being militant sympathizers; in raping them, the security forces are attempting to punish and humiliate the entire community.

The allegation of mass rape incidents as well as forced disappearances are reflected in a Kashmiri short documentary film by an Independent Kashmiri film-maker, the Ocean of Tears produced by a non-governmental non-profit organisation called the Public Service Broadcasting Trust of India and approved by the Ministry of Information and Broadcasting (India). The film depicts mass rape incidents in Kunan Poshpora and Shopian as facts and alleges that Indian Security Forces were responsible.

Médecins Sans Frontières conducted a research survey in 2005 that found 11.6% of the interviewees who took part had been victims of sexual abuse since 1989. This empirical study found that witnesses to rape in Kashmir was comparatively far higher than the other conflict zones such as Sierra Leone and Sri Lanka. 63% of people had heard of rape and 13% of the people had witnessed a rape. Dr Seema Kazi holds the security forces more responsible for raping than militants due to rape by the former being larger in scale and frequency. In areas of militant activity the security forces use rape to destroy morale of Kashmiri resistance. Dr Seema Kazi says these rapes cannot be ignored as rare occurrences nor should be ignored the documented acknowledgement of individual soldiers that they were ordered to rape. Kazi explains rape in Kashmir as a cultural weapon of war:

In the particular context of Kashmir where an ethnic Muslim minority population is subject to the repressive dominance of a predominantly Hindu State, the sexual appropriation of Kashmiri women by State security forces exploits the cultural logic of rape whereby the sexual dishonour of individual women is coterminous with the subjection and subordination of Kashmiri men and the community at large.

Former Chief Justice of Jammu and Kashmir High Court noted in his report on human rights in Kashmir: "It is hard to escape the conclusion that the security forces who are overwhelmingly Hindu and Sikh, see it as their duty to beat an alien population into submission."

Some surveys have found that in the Kashmir region itself (where the bulk of separatist and Indian military activity is concentrated), popular perception holds that the Indian Armed Forces are more to blame for human rights violations than the separatist groups. Amnesty International criticized the Indian Military regarding an incident on 22 April 1996, when several armed forces personnel forcibly entered the house of a 32-year-old woman in the village of Wawoosa in the Rangreth district of Jammu and Kashmir. They reportedly molested her 12-year-old daughter and raped her other three daughters, aged 14, 16, and 18. When another woman attempted to prevent the soldiers from attacking her two daughters, she was beaten. Soldiers reportedly told her 17-year-old daughter to remove her clothes so that they could check whether she was hiding a gun. They molested her before leaving the house.

According to an op-ed published in a BBC journal, the emphasis of the movement after 1989, ″soon shifted from nationalism to Islam.″ It also claimed that the minority community of Kashmiri Pandits, who have lived in Kashmir for centuries, were forced to leave their homeland. Reports by the Indian government state 219 Kashmiri pandits were killed and around 140,000 migrated due to millitancy while over 3000 remained in the valley. The local organisation of Pandits in Kashmir, Kashmir Pandit Sangharsh Samiti claimed that 399 Kashmiri Pandits were killed by insurgents. Al Jazeera states that 650 Pandits were murdered by militants. Human Rights Watch also blamed Pakistan for supporting militants in Kashmir, in same 2006 report it says, "There is considerable evidence that over many years Pakistan has provided Kashmiri militants with training, weapons, funding and sanctuary. Pakistan remains accountable for abuses committed by militants that it has armed and trained."

Our people were killed. I saw a girl tortured with cigarette butts. Another man had his eyes pulled out and his body hung on a tree. The armed separatists used a chainsaw to cut our bodies into pieces. It wasn't just the killing but the way they tortured and killed.

— A crying old Kashmiri Hindu in refugee camps of Jammu to a BBC news reporter

The violence was condemned and labelled as ethnic cleansing in a 2006 resolution passed by the United States Congress. It stated that the Islamic terrorists infiltrated the region in 1989 and began an ethnic cleansing campaign to convert Kashmir into a Muslim state. According to the same resolution, since then nearly 400,000 Pandits were either murdered or forced to leave their ancestral homes.

According to a Hindu American Foundation report, the rights and religious freedom of Kashmiri Hindus have been severely curtailed since 1989, when there was an organised and systematic campaign by Islamist militants to cleanse Hindus from Kashmir. Less than 4,000 Kashmiri Hindus remain in the valley, reportedly living with daily threats of violence and terrorism. Sanjay Tickoo, who heads the KPSS, an organisation which looks after Pandits who remain in the Valley, says the situation is complex. On one hand the community did face intimidation and violence but on the other hand he says there was no genocide or mass murder as suggested by Pandits who are based outside of Kashmir.

The displaced Pandits, many of whom continue to live in temporary refugee camps in Jammu and Delhi, are still unable to safely return to their homeland. The lead in this act of ethnic cleansing was initially taken by the Jammu & Kashmir Liberation Front and the Hizbul Mujahideen. According to Indian media, all this happened at the instigation of Pakistan's Inter-Services Intelligence (ISI) by a group of Kashmiri terrorist elements who were trained, armed and motivated by the ISI. Reportedly, organisations trained and armed by the ISI continued this ethnic cleansing until practically all the Kashmiri Pandits were driven out after having been subjected to numerous indignities and brutalities such as rape, torture, forcible seizure of property etc.

The separatists in Kashmir deny these allegations. The Indian government is also trying to reinstate the displaced Pandits in Kashmir. Tahir, the district commander of a separatist Islamic group in Kashmir, stated: "We want the Kashmiri Pandits to come back. They are our brothers. We will try to protect them." But the majority of the Pandits, who have been living in pitiable conditions in Jammu, believe that, until insurgency ceases to exist, return is not possible. Mustafa Kamal, brother of Union Minister Farooq Abdullah, blamed security forces, former Jammu and Kashmir governor Jagmohan and PDP leader Mufti Sayeed for forcing the migration of Kashmiri Pandits from the Valley. Jagmohan denies these allegations. Pro-India politician Abdul Rashid says Pandits forced the migration on themselves so Muslims can be killed. He says the plan was to leave Muslims alone and bulldoze them freely.

The CIA has reported that at least 506,000 people from Indian Administered Kashmir are internally displaced, about half of who are Hindu Pandits.

=== Pakistan administered Kashmir ===
==== Azad Kashmir ====
The 2010 Chatham House opinion poll of Azad Kashmir's people found that overall concerns about human rights abuses in 'Azad Kashmir' was 19%. The district where concern over human rights abuses was greatest was Bhimber where 32% of people expressed concern over human rights abuses. The lowest was in the district of Sudanhoti where concern over human rights abuses was a mere 5%.

Claims of religious discrimination and restrictions on religious freedom in Azad Kashmir have been made against Pakistan. The country is also accused of systemic suppression of free speech and demonstrations against the government. UNHCR reported that a number of Islamist militant groups, including al-Qaeda, operate from bases in Pakistani-administered Kashmir with the tacit permission of ISI There have also been several allegations of human rights abuse.

In 2006, Human Rights Watch accused ISI and the military of systemic torture with the purpose of "punishing" errant politicians, political activists and journalists in Azad Kashmir. According to Brad Adams, the Asia director at Human Rights Watch, the problems of human rights abuses in Azad Kashmir were not "rampant" but they needed to be addressed, and that the severity of human rights issues in Indian-administered Kashmir were "much, much, much greater". A report titled "Kashmir: Present Situation and Future Prospects", submitted to the European Parliament by Emma Nicholson, was critical of the lack of human rights, justice, democracy, and Kashmiri representation in the Pakistan National Assembly. According to the Human Rights Commission of Pakistan, Pakistan's ISI operates in Pakistani-administered Kashmir and is accused of involvement in extensive surveillance, arbitrary arrests, torture, and murder. The 2008 report by the United Nations High Commissioner for Refugees determined that Pakistani-administered Kashmir was 'not free'. According to Shaukat Ali, chairman of the International Kashmir Alliance, "On one hand Pakistan claims to be the champion of the right of self-determination of the Kashmiri people, but she has denied the same rights under its controlled parts of Kashmir and Gilgit-Baltistan".

After the 2011 elections, Azad Kashmir Prime Minister Sardar Attique Ahmad Khan stated that there were mistakes in the voters list which have raised questions about the credibility of the elections.

In December 1993, the blasphemy laws of Pakistan were extended to Pakistan Administered Kashmir. The area is ruled directly through a chief executive Lt. Gen. Mohammed Shafiq, appointed by Islamabad with a 26-member Northern Areas Council.

UNCR reports that the status of women in Pakistani-administered Kashmir is similar to that of women in Pakistan. They are not granted equal rights under the law, and their educational opportunities and choice of marriage partner remain "circumscribed". Domestic violence, forced marriage, and other forms of abuse continue to be issues of concern. In May 2007, the United Nations and other aid agencies temporarily suspended their work after suspected Islamists mounted an arson attack on the home of two aid workers after the organisations had received warnings against hiring women. However, honour killings and rape occur less frequently than in other areas of Pakistan.

Scholar Sumantra Bose comments that the uprising remained restricted to the Indian side and did not spill over into Pakistani-administered Kashmir despite a lack of democratic freedoms on the Pakistani side. Bose offers a number of possible explanations for this. Azad Kashmir's strong pro-Pakistan allegiances and a relatively smaller population are suggested as reasons. But Bose believes that a stronger explanation was that Pakistan had itself been a military-bureaucratic state for most of its history without stable democratic institutions. According to Bose, the Kashmiri Muslims had higher expectations from India which turned out to be a "moderately successful" democracy and it was in this context that Kashmiri Muslim rage spilled over after the rigging of the elections in 1987. The residents of Azad Kashmir are also mostly Punjabi, differing in ethnicity from Kashmiris in the Indian administered section of the state.

==== Gilgit-Baltistan ====
The main demand of the people of Gilgit-Baltistan is constitutional status for the region as a fifth province of Pakistan. However, Pakistan claims that Gilgit-Baltistan cannot be given constitutional status due to Pakistan's commitment to the 1948 UN resolution. In 2007, the International Crisis Group stated that "Almost six decades after Pakistan's independence, the constitutional status of the Federally Administered Northern Areas (Gilgit and Baltistan), once part of the former princely state of Jammu and Kashmir and now under Pakistani control, remains undetermined, with political autonomy a distant dream. The region's inhabitants are embittered by Islamabad's unwillingness to devolve powers in real terms to its elected representatives, and a nationalist movement, which seeks independence, is gaining ground. The rise of sectarian extremism is an alarming consequence of this denial of basic political rights". A two-day conference on Gilgit-Baltistan was held on 8–9 April 2008 at the European Parliament in Brussels under the auspices of the International Kashmir Alliance. Several members of the European Parliament urged the government of Pakistan to establish democratic institutions and the rule of law in the area.

In 2009, the Pakistani government implemented an autonomy package for Gilgit-Baltistan, which entails rights similar to those of Pakistan's other provinces. Gilgit-Baltistan thus gains province-like status without actually being conferred such status constitutionally. Direct rule by Islamabad has been replaced by an elected legislative assembly under a chief minister. The 2009 reform has not satisfied locals who demand citizenship rights and it has continued to leave Gilgit Baltistan's constitutional status within Pakistan undefined; although it has added to the self-identification of the territory. According to Antia Mato Bouzas, the PPP-led Pakistani government had attempted a compromise between its official position on Kashmir and the demands of a population where the majority may have pro-Pakistan sentiments.

There has been criticism and opposition to this move in Pakistan, India, and Pakistani-administered Kashmir. The move has been dubbed a cover-up to hide the real mechanics of power, which allegedly are under the direct control of the Pakistani federal government. The package was opposed by Pakistani Kashmiri politicians who claimed that the integration of Gilgit-Baltistan into Pakistan would undermine their case for the independence of Kashmir from India. 300 activists from Kashmiri groups protested during the first Gilgit-Baltistan legislative assembly elections, with some carrying banners reading "Pakistan's expansionist designs in Gilgit-Baltistan are unacceptable" In December 2009, activists from nationalist Kashmiri groups staged a protest in Muzaffarabad to condemn the alleged rigging of elections and the killing of an 18-year-old student.

== Map legality ==
As with other disputed territories, each government issues maps depicting their claims in Kashmir territory, regardless of actual control. Due to India's Criminal Law Amendment Act, 1961, it is illegal in India to exclude all or part of Kashmir from a map (or to publish any map that differs from those of the Survey of India).

== Statistics ==
=== Government and quasi-government sources ===
In 2008, authorities said that 43,000 people have been killed in the violence. Data released in 2011 by Jammu and Kashmir government stated that, in the last 21 years, 43,460 people have been killed in the Kashmir insurgency. Of these, 21,323 are militants, 13,226 civilians killed by militants, 3,642 civilians killed by security forces, and 5,369 policemen killed by militants. In 2019, following the abrogation of Article 370, Home minister Amit Shah said that 35,000 security personnel had died as a result of the insurgency, and that the abrogation would serve as a tribute to their sacrifices.

According to the Government of India Home Ministry, 2008 was the year with the lowest civilian casualties in 20 years, with 89 deaths, compared to a high of 1,413 in 1996. In 2008, 85 security personnel died compared to 613 in 2001, while 102 militants were killed. The human rights situation improved, with only one custodial death, and no custodial disappearances. Many analysts say Pakistan's preoccupation with jihadis within its own borders explains the relative calm. In March 2009, Abdullah stated that only 800 militants were active in the state and out of these only 30% were Kashmiris.

=== Independent, separatist, and militant sources ===
Since 1989 and by 2006, over 50,000 people are claimed by Human Rights Watch to have died during the conflict, with at least 20,000 of them civilian. In 2016 Jammu and Kashmir Coalition of Civil Society said there had been 70,000 plus killings, a majority committed by the Indian armed forces. The pro-Pakistan Hurriyat group has claimed a higher death toll of 80,000 including civilians, security forces and militants. Syed Salahuddin, the head of the Hizbul Mujahideen separatist organization, has claimed that 37,000 Indian security personnel have been killed in the militancy, "and twice that number wounded", while he put the number of militants killed at 15,000.

== Natural disaster diplomacy ==
The 2005 Kashmir earthquake, which killed over 80,000 people, led to India and Pakistan finalising negotiations for the opening of a road for disaster relief through Kashmir. 2014 India–Pakistan floods was also followed by statements of cooperation by leaders of both countries.

== See also ==
- Insurgency in Jammu and Kashmir
- History of Kashmir
- India–Pakistan relations
- Indian White Paper on Jammu and Kashmir
- Indo-Pakistani wars and conflicts
- United Nations Military Observer Group in Kashmir

== Bibliography ==
- Abdullah, Sheikh; Taing, M. Y. (1985), Atish-e-Chinar [Flames of the Chinar] (in Urdu), Srinagar: Shaukat Publications. Often referred to as Sheikh Abdullah's autobiography. It has not been copyrighted in deference to Sheikh Abdullah's wishes.
- Ankit, Rakesh (2016), The Kashmir Conflict: From Empire to the Cold War, 1945–66, Routledge, ISBN 978-1-317-22525-6
  - Ankit, Rakesh (2014), Kashmir, 1945–66: From Empire to the Cold War (phd), University of Southampton
- Ankit, Rakesh (2013), "Britain and Kashmir, 1948: "The Arena of the UN"", Diplomacy & Statecraft, 24 (2): 273–290, doi:10.1080/09592296.2013.789771, S2CID 154021048
- Balcerowicz, Piotr; Kuszewska, Agnieszka (2022), Human Rights Violations in Kashmir, Routledge, ISBN 978-1-032-04849-9
- Behera, Navnita Chadha (2006), Demystifying Kashmir, Brookings Institution Press, ISBN 978-0-8157-0860-5
  - Behera, Navnita Chadha (2007), Demystifying Kashmir, Pearson Education India, ISBN 978-8131708460
- Bagchi, Sanjoy (6 July 2002), "The First War with Pakistan", Economic and Political Weekly, 37 (27): 2709–2712, JSTOR 4412323
- Bose, Sumantra (2003). Kashmir: Roots of Conflict, Paths to Peace. Harvard University Press. ISBN 978-0-674-01173-1.
- Bose, Sumantra (2021), Kashmir at the Crossroads: Inside a 21st-Century Conflict, Yale University Press, ISBN 978-0-300-26271-1
- Bhatia, Mohita (2020), Rethinking Conflict at the Margins: Dalits and Borderland Hindus in Jammu and Kashmir, Cambridge University Press, ISBN 978-1-108-83602-9
- Bhatia, Mohita (2021), "Secularization and desecularization in Jammu: interrogating the canonical approaches", in Tremblay, Reeta Chowdhari; Bhatia, Mohita (eds.), Religion and Politics in Jammu and Kashmir, Routledge, ISBN 978-0-367-51068-8
- Brecher, Michael (1953). The Struggle for Kashmir. Oxford University Press.
- Byman, Daniel (2005), Deadly Connections: States that Sponsor Terrorism, Cambridge University Press, ISBN 978-0-521-83973-0
- Chattha, Ilyas (2011), Partition and Locality: Violence, Migration and Development in Gujranwala and Sialkot 1947–1961, Oxford University Press, ISBN 9780199061723
  - Chattha, Ilyas Ahmad (September 2009), Partition and Its Aftermath: Violence, Migration and the Role of Refugees in the Socio-Economic Development of Gujranwala and Sialkot Cities, 1947–1961 (PDF), University of Southampton, archived from the original (PDF) on 28 April 2016
- Chowdhary, Rekha (2016), Jammu and Kashmir: Politics of Identity and Separatism, Routledge, ISBN 978-1-138-92195-5
- Copland, Ian (2005), State, Community and Neighbourhood in Princely India, c. 1900–1950, Palgrave Macmillan, ISBN 978-0230005983
- Gupta, Jyoti Bhusan Das (2012), Jammu and Kashmir, Springer, ISBN 978-94-011-9231-6
- Dasgupta, Chandrashekhar (2002), War and Diplomacy in Kashmir,1947–48, SAGE Publications, ISBN 978-0-7619-9588-3
- Dasgupta, Chandrashekhar (2005), "Jammu and Kashmir in the Indian Union: The Politics of Autonomy", in Rafiq Dossani; Henry S. Rowen (eds.), Prospects for Peace in South Asia, Stanford University Press, pp. 239–260, ISBN 978-0-8047-5085-1
- Dixit, J. N. (2003), India-Pakistan in War and Peace, Routledge, ISBN 978-1-134-40758-3
- Fair, C. Christine (January 2011), "The Militant Challenge in Pakistan", Asia Policy, 11: 105–137, doi:10.1353/asp.2011.0010, S2CID 155007730, SSRN 1720643
- Šumit Ganguly (1999), The Crisis in Kashmir: Portents of War, Hopes of Peace, Cambridge University Press, ISBN 978-0-521-65566-8
- Ganguly, Sumit (2016), Deadly Impasse: Kashmir and Inda-Pakistani Relations at the Dawn of a New Century, Cambridge University Press, ISBN 978-0-521-76361-5
- Gates, Scott; Roy, Kaushik (2014), Unconventional Warfare in South Asia: Shadow Warriors and counterinsurgency, Ashgate Publishing, ISBN 9781409437062
- Giustozzi, Antonio (2023), Jihadism in Pakistan: Al-Qa’ida, Islamic State and the Local Militants, I. B. Tauris, ISBN 978-0-7556-4735-4
- Guha, Ramachandra (28 August 2004), "Opening a Window in Kashmir", Economic and Political Weekly, 39 (35): 3905–3913, JSTOR 4415473
- Guha, Ramachandra (2008), India after Gandhi: The History of the World's Largest Democracy, Pan Macmillan, ISBN 978-0330396110
- Haqqani, Husain (2010), Pakistan: Between Mosque and Military, Carnegie Endowment, ISBN 978-0-87003-285-1
- Ishaq Khan, Mohammad (1996), "Kashmiri Muslims: Social and Identity Consciousness", Comparative Studies of South Asia, Africa and the Middle East, XVI (2): 25–38, doi:10.1215/1089201x-16-2-25
- Hussain, Shahla (2018), "Kashmiri Visions of Freedom: The Past and the Present", in Zutshi, Chitralekha (ed.), Kashmir: History, Politics, Representation, Cambridge University Press, ISBN 978-1-107-18197-7
- Hussain, Shahla (2021), Kashmir in the Aftermath of Partition, Cambridge University Press, ISBN 978-1-108-49046-7
- Jaffrelot, Christophe (1996), The Hindu Nationalist Movement and Indian Politics, C. Hurst & Co. Publishers, ISBN 978-1850653011
- Jaffrelot, Christophe (2011), Religion, Caste, and Politics in India, C Hurst & Co, ISBN 978-1849041386
- Jha, Prem Shankar (2003), The Origins of a Dispute: Kashmir 1947, Oxford University Press, ISBN 978-0-19-566486-7
- Kazi, Seema (2014), "Rape, Impunity and Justice in Kashmir" (PDF), Socio-Legal Review, 10, The National Law School of India University, Bangalore: 14–46, doi:10.55496/ZCWJ8096, ISSN 0973-5216, archived from the original (PDF) on 18 November 2016
- Kazi, Seema (2018), "Sexual Crimes and the Struggle for Justice in Kashmir", in Haley Duschinski; Mona Bhan; Ather Zia; Cynthia Mahmood (eds.), Resisting Occupation in Kashmir, University of Pennsylvania Press, ISBN 978-0-8122-9496-5
- Korbel, Josef (1953), "The Kashmir dispute after six years", International Organization, 7 (4), Cambridge University Press: 498–510, doi:10.1017/s0020818300007256, JSTOR 2704850, S2CID 155022750
- Korbel, Josef (1966) [1954], Danger in Kashmir (second ed.), Princeton University Press, ISBN 9781400875238
- Kumar, Radha; Puri, Ellora (2009), "Jammu and Kashmir: Frameworks for a Settlement", in Kumar, Radha (ed.), Negotiating Peace in Deeply Divided Societies: A Set of Simulations, SAGE, ISBN 978-81-7829-882-5
- Levy, Adrian; Scott-Clark, Catherine (2010), Deception: Pakistan, the United States, and the Secret Trade in Nuclear Weapons, Bloomsbury Publishing, ISBN 978-0-8027-1860-0
- Metcalf, Barbara; Metcalf, Thomas R. (2006), A Concise History of Modern India, Cambridge Concise Histories, Cambridge and New York: Cambridge University Press, ISBN 978-0-521-68225-1
- Nawaz, Shuja (May 2008), "The First Kashmir War Revisited", India Review, 7 (2): 115–154, doi:10.1080/14736480802055455, S2CID 155030407
- Noorani, A. G. (2014) [first published in 2013 by Tulika Books], The Kashmir Dispute, 1947–2012, Oxford University Press, ISBN 978-0-19-940018-8
- Panigrahi, D. N. (2009), Jammu and Kashmir, the Cold War and the West, Routledge, ISBN 978-1-136-51751-8
- Paul, T. V. (1994), Asymmetric Conflicts: War Initiation by Weaker Powers, Cambridge University Press, ISBN 978-0-521-46621-9
- Puri, Balraj (November 2010), "The Question of Accession", Epilogue, 4 (11): 4–6
- Puri, Luv (2013), Across the Line of Control: Inside Azad Kashmir, Columbia University Press, ISBN 978-0-231-80084-6
- Raghavan, Srinath (2010), War and Peace in Modern India, Palgrave Macmillan, ISBN 978-1-137-00737-7
- Rai, Mridu (2004). Hindu Rulers, Muslim Subjects: Islam, Rights, and the History of Kashmir. C. Hurst & Co. ISBN 978-1850656616.
- Rizvi, Gowher (1992), "India, Pakistan and the Kashmir Problem", in Raju G. C. Thomas (ed.), Perspectives on Kashmir: the roots of conflict in South Asia, Westview Press, pp. 47–79, ISBN 978-0-8133-8343-9
- Sarila, Narendra Singh (2007), The Shadow of the Great Game: The Untold Story of India's Partition, Constable, ISBN 978-1-84529-588-2
- Schaffer, Howard B. (2009), The Limits of Influence: America's Role in Kashmir, Brookings Institution Press, ISBN 978-0-8157-0370-9
- Schofield, Victoria (2003) [2000], Kashmir in Conflict, London and New York: I. B. Taurus & Co, ISBN 978-1860648984
- Shankar, Mahesh (2016), "Nehru's Legacy in Kashmir: Why a plebiscite never happened", India Review, 15 (1): 1–21, doi:10.1080/14736489.2016.1129926, S2CID 155701436
- Snedden, Christopher (2013) [first published as The Untold Story of the People of Azad Kashmir, 2012], Kashmir: The Unwritten History, HarperCollins India, ISBN 978-9350298985
- Snedden, Christopher (2021), Independent Kashmir: An incomplete aspiration, Manchester University Press, ISBN 978-1-5261-5614-3
- Singh, Gurharpal (2000), Ethnic Conflict in India: A Case Study of Punjab, Palgrave Macmillan UK, ISBN 978-0-333-98177-1
- Subbiah, Sumathi (2004), "Security Council Mediation and the Kashmir Dispute: Reflections on Its Failures and Possibilities for Renewal", Boston College International and Comparative Law Review, 27 (1): 173–185
- Subramaniam, Arjun (2016), India's Wars: A Military History, 1947–1971, HarperCollins India, ISBN 978-9351777496
- Swami, Praveen (2006), India, Pakistan and the Secret Jihad: The Covert War in Kashmir, 1947–2004, Routledge, ISBN 978-1-134-13752-7
- Talbot, Ian; Singh, Gurharpal (2009), The Partition of India, Cambridge University Press, ISBN 978-0-521-85661-4
- Varshney, Ashutosh (1992). "Three Compromised Nationalisms: Why Kashmir has been a Problem" ( (PDF)). In Raju G. C. Thomas (ed.). Perspectives on Kashmir: the roots of conflict in South Asia. Westview Press. pp. 191–234. ISBN 978-0-8133-8343-9. Archived from the original on 3 October 2018.
- Warikoo, Kulbhushan (2011), "Islamist extremism in Kashmir", in Warikoo, K. Chowdhari (ed.), Religion and Security in South and Central Asia, Routledge, ISBN 978-0-415-57590-4
- Webb, Mathew J. (2012), Kashmir's Right to Secede: A critical examination of contemporary theories of secession, Routledge, ISBN 978-0-415-66543-8
- Zutshi, Chitralekha (2004), Languages of Belonging: Islam, Regional Identity, and the Making of Kashmir, C. Hurst & Co. Publishers, ISBN 978-1-85065-700-2
- Zutshi, Chitralekha (2019), Kashmir, Oxford India Short Introductions, ISBN 978-0-19-099046-6
