= Timeline of the Kashmir conflict =

The following is a timeline of the Kashmir conflict, a territorial conflict between India, Pakistan and, to a lesser degree, China. India and Pakistan have been involved in four wars and several border skirmishes over the issue.

== 1846–1945: Princely state ==
- 16 March 1846: Princely state of Jammu and Kashmir was created with the signing of the Second Treaty of Amritsar between the British East India company and Raja Gulab Singh of Jammu. It was an addendum to the Treaty of Lahore, signed one week earlier, which gave the terms of surrender of the Sikh Darbar at Lahore to the British. The Sikhs could not pay part of the demand made by the British; Gulab Singh paid Rs 7,500,000 on their behalf, and in return received Kashmir Valley, part of the Sikh territories, to add to Jammu and Ladakh already under his rule. Gulab Singh accepted overall British sovereignty. Kashmir Valley was a Muslim-majority region speaking the Kashmiri language and had a distinct culture called Kashmiriyat.
- 10 May 1857 – 1 November 1858: India's First War of Independence.
- 2 August 1858: End of Company rule in India.
- 20 April 1927: Maharaja Hari Singh passed the Hereditary State Subject order, granting special privileges to the state subjects for jobs and residence in the state. According to the order an "outsider" could gain state subject status "after the age of 18 on purchasing immovable property under permission of an ijazatnama and on obtaining a rayatnama after ten years continuous residence in the Jammu and Kashmir State".
- 1931: The movement against the Maharaja Hari Singh began and was brutally suppressed by the State forces. Hari Singh was part of a Hindu Dogra dynasty which ruled over a majority Muslim State. The predominantly Muslim population was kept poor, illiterate and inadequately represented in the State's services.
- April 1932: The Glancy Commission appointed by the Maharaja recommended the establishment of a legislative assembly, called the Praja Sabha. It would have 75 members, with 15 official representatives, 33 elected representatives and the remaining seats held by the Maharaja's nominees. Of the 33 elected seats, 21 would be reserved for Muslims, 10 for Hindus and 2 for Sikhs. The Maharaja accepted these recommendations but delayed implementation, leading to protests in 1934. The Maharaja granted a constitution providing a legislative assembly for the people, but it was powerless.
- June 1932: The All Jammu and Kashmir Muslim Conference was founded by Sheikh Abdullah in collaboration with Chaudhry Ghulam Abbas to fight for the rights of the State's Muslims.
- September 1934: The first elections for the Praja Sabha (the state's legislative assembly) were held. The Muslim Conference won 16 of the 21 seats reserved for Muslims, but lost two of them to the Liberal Group, which had the majority in the assembly. Soon afterwards, the younger leaders of the Muslim Conference pleaded for broadening the party to include all the people of the state.
- 1937: Sheikh Abdullah met with Jawaharlal Nehru for the first time.
- May 1938: The second election for the state's Legislative Assembly was held. The Muslim Conference won all 19 contested seats. Two independent candidates that won were said to have joined the Muslim Conference afterwards.
- June 1939: Under Sheikh Abdullah's leadership, the Muslim Conference changed its name to National Conference and opened membership to people of all religions. At the same time, the National Conference joined the All India States Peoples Conference, a Congress-allied group of movements in princely states.
- 23 March 1940: The Pakistan Resolution was passed at Iqbal Park, Lahore. The resolution demanded the establishment of an independent state comprising all regions with Muslim majorities. The letter "K" in the name "Pakistan" represented Kashmir.
- 1941: Chaudhry Ghulam Abbas left the National Conference and revived the old Muslim Conference. The Muslim Conference became a client of the Jinnah-led Muslim League.
- 1941: 71,667 Kashmiris joined the British Indian Army for World War II; seven-eighths of them were Muslim, mainly from the Poonch-Mirpur area.
- April 1944: Sheikh Abdullah proposed a Naya Kashmir (New Kashmir) programme to the Maharaja, calling for a constitutional monarchy.
- 1944: Mohammad Ali Jinnah visited Kashmir during the summer, supporting the Muslim Conference in preference to the National Conference.

== 1946–1947: Kashmir unrest and accession ==
=== 1946 ===
- May 1946: Sheikh Abdullah launched the Quit Kashmir movement against the Maharaja; he was arrested and charged with sedition. Jawaharlal Nehru attempted to go to Kashmir to defend Abdullah in court but was arrested and forced to leave the State.
- June 1946: Representatives of the Muslim Conference met Jinnah in Karachi and were told to capitalise on the failure of Sheikh Abdullah to unseat the Maharaja.
- July 1946: The Muslim Conference complained that Prime Minister Ram Chandra Kak was oppressing Muslims.
- July 1946: The Maharaja declared that Kashmiris would decide their own destiny without outside interference.
- October 1946: The Muslim Conference launched a "Campaign of Action" demanding the end of autocratic rule by the Maharaja. Chaudhry Ghulam Abbas was imprisoned.
- November 1946: The British Resident in Kashmir observed that the Maharaja and Prime Minister Ram Chandra Kak intended to stay away from the Indian Union (the proposed independent country, prior to the partition decision). The reason cited was "antagonism... displayed by a Congress Central Government" towards Kashmir.
- December 1946: The British Resident reported that the "new leaders" of the Muslim Conference, Chaudhry Ghulam Abbas and Agha Shaukat Ali, were stirring anti-Hindu sentiments in the guise of Muslim unity.
- December 1946: Hindu and Sikh refugees from the Hazara district poured into Muzaffarabad. 2,500 of them were looked after by the state.

=== Early 1947 ===
- January 1947: Elections were held for the State's legislative assembly. The National Conference boycotted the elections, and the Muslim Conference won 16 of the 21 Muslim seats.
- 2 March 1947: Khizar Hayat Khan Tiwana resigned as the premier of Punjab, representing a collapse of the Unionist government of Punjab. Punjab was rocked by communal violence, culminating in massacres of Sikhs and Hindus in the Rawalpindi Division. Tens of thousands of refugees fled the area, with many seeking shelter in Jammu and Kashmir.
- March 1947: Reuters reported that Kashmir had reinforced its troops along the Kashmir–Punjab border to ensure that the communal violence of Punjab did not spill into Kashmir. The border was virtually sealed.
- March 1947: The British Resident reported that the Pir of Manki Sharif, a Muslim League leader in the North-West Frontier Province, had sent agents to Kashmir to prepare the people for a "holy crusade".
- March 1947: Lord Mountbatten arrived in India as the last Viceroy of India, amidst country-wide communal riots.

=== April 1947 ===
- April 1947: Hindus and Sikhs of Sialkot fled to Jammu in the face of increasing tensions. The exodus increased in June and continued until August.
- 21 April 1947: The Maharaja was met by a gathering of 40,000 demobilised soldiers in Rawalakot. He was "specially impressed and alarmed", according to Azad Kashmir sources.

=== May 1947 ===
- 1 May 1947: The Maharani of Jammu and Kashmir along with Yuvraj Karan Singh initiated discussions with Justice Mehr Chand Mahajan, a judge of the Punjab High Court with connections to the Indian National Congress, to come in as the Prime Minister of Kashmir. Mahajan showed reluctance.
- 24 May 1947: The Indian National Congress acting president Acharya Kripalani visited Kashmir to discuss democratic reforms and joining the Constituent Assembly of India.
- 28 May 1947: Muslim Conference acting president Choudhary Hamidullah announced that the party had decided "to acquire independence for the State".

=== June 1947 ===
- 3 June 1947: Mountbatten proposed the partition plan to divide British India into independent dominions of India and Pakistan.
- 13 June 1947: At the Joint Defence Council meeting, Jinnah and Nehru disagreed on the accession of princely states, Jinnah asserting that it was for the rulers to decide and Nehru insisting that it was for the people.
- 19 June 1947: Lord Mountbatten visited Kashmir for 5 days to persuade the Maharaja to accede to India or Pakistan. The Maharaja showed reluctance.
- June 1947: Poonchis started a 'No Tax' campaign against the Maharaja's administration.
- June 1947: The Maharaja met with Punjab businessman Rai Bahadur Gopal Das and expressed fears of ill-treatment at the hands of Congressmen. Gopal Das relayed this to Vallabhbhai Patel.

=== July 1947 ===
- July 1947: The Maharaja forced the disarming of demobilised soldiers in Poonch and Mirpur. Muslims complained that the arms they deposited with the police were distributed to Hindus and Sikhs for self-defence.
- 3 July 1947: Vallabhbhai Patel wrote to the Maharaja to allay his fears of ill-will from the Indian National Congress. Patel encouraged him to visit Delhi for discussions. The receipt of the letter was followed by detailed discussions between the Maharaja and Gopal Das. By 14 July, the Maharaja is reported to have decided on declaring general amnesty to all political prisoners and dismissing the Prime Minister Ram Chandra Kak.
- 11 July 1947: Muhammad Ali Jinnah advised the Muslim Conference acting president Choudhry Hamidullah to support the Maharaja's wish for independence. Jinnah also issued a press statement to the effect that, if Kashmir opted for independence, Pakistan would have friendly relations with it.
- 19 July 1947: At a convention of the Muslim Conference workers in Srinagar, followers of Acting President Choudhry Hamidullah supported independence for the state, and those of Mirwaiz Yousuf Shah supported accession to Pakistan. The eventual compromise resolution requested the Maharaja to declare the "internal autonomy" of the state and accede to Pakistan for defence, foreign affairs and communications. Jinnah's personal secretary K. H. Khurshid assured the Maharaja that Pakistan would not "take away an iota of his power".
- 23 July 1947: State's Prime Minister Ram Chandra Kak visited Delhi for 5 days, meeting Mountbatten and the political leaders of Congress and Muslim League. He explained that the State had decided not to accede to either Dominion.

=== August 1947 ===
- 1 August 1947: Mahatma Gandhi visited the Maharaja and impressed upon him the need to be prompt in deciding on the State's accession based on the people's wishes. In discussions with Ram Chandra Kak, Gandhi pointed out Kak's lack of popularity among the people and Kak offered to resign.
- 1 August 1947: The Gilgit Agency was transferred by the British to the Maharaja. British Political Agent Colonel Roger Bacon handed over power to Major Ghansara Singh, the appointed Governor of Gilgit. Major William Brown was appointed the commander of Gilgit Scouts.
- 11 August 1947: The Maharaja dismissed Prime Minister Ram Chandra Kak and replaced him with retired Major Janak Singh. A second invitation was made to Justice Mahajan to become Prime Minister. Due to floods and partition violence, the message reached him on 25 August.
- 11 August 1947 – 13 August 1947: Partition violence erupted in Sialkot, and drove the surviving Hindus and Sikhs to Jammu.
- 14 August 1947 – 15 August 1947: Independence and Partition of British India into India and Pakistan. Kashmir signed the Standstill Agreement with Pakistan. India requested further discussions for a standstill agreement.
- 18 August 1947: In one of the worst train massacres of the Partition, Lohars and 'Kashmiris' of Nizamabad killed all the Hindu and Sikh passengers of a Wazirabad–Jammu train.
- 20 August 1947: Pakistan Army formulated Operation Gulmarg to organise a tribal invasion of Kashmir.
- 23 August 1947: Rebels under the command of Sardar Abdul Qayyum fired on the State Forces at Bagh. According to Major General Henry Lawrence Scott, the Chief of Staff of State Forces, they had been incited by 30 Muslims from West Punjab that entered the State a few days earlier.
- 25 August 1947: The Maharani's emissary delivered an invitation to Justice Mahajan, with a repeated request on 7 September.
- 25 August 1947: The Muslim Conference wrote to Pakistani Prime Minister Liaquat Ali Khan and claimed that the state's government and the National Conference were intriguing. "If, God forbid, the Pakistan Government or the Muslim League do not act, Kashmir might be lost to them and the responsibility would be theirs," warned the communication.
- 28 August 1947: Colonel Akbar Khan, who would later operate as 'General Tariq' commanding Pakistani irregulars, arrived in Rawalpindi. The Prince Albert Victor's Own Cavalry (later 11th Cavalry) was briefed on Pakistan's "invasion plans" by Akbar Khan, along with Colonels Sher Khan and Khanzadeh.
- 28 August 1947: The Muslim Conference leader in Poonch, Sardar Ibrahim, arrived in Lahore to seek Pakistan's assistance for a rebellion. He was ignored by officials, but entertained by the provincial Muslim League leader Mian Iftikharuddin. Ibrahim headed to Murree to set up a base for the rebellion.

=== September 1947 ===
- September 1947: Pakistan deputed Mian Iftikharuddin to visit Kashmir to assess Pakistan's prospects for its accession. En route, Iftikharuddin introduced Sardar Ibrahim to Colonel Akbar Khan in Murree. Sardar Ibrahim requested arms for the rebels.
- 4 September 1947: Henry Lawrence Scott informed the Maharaja that 400 armed Muslims infiltrated from Kahuta into the state to terrorise the Hindu and Sikh minorities. Kashmir reported the information to Pakistan and urged it to control the infiltration.
- 4 September 1947: Civil & Military Gazette reported that there was an uprising in the Poonch area.
- 9 September 1947: Pakistan blocked supplies of petrol, sugar, salt and kerosene and stopped trade in timber, fruits, fur and carpets in violation of the standstill agreement.
- 12 September 1947: Liaquat Ali Khan approved the plan for "Armed Revolt inside Kashmir" prepared by Colonel Akbar Khan and another plan prepared by Sardar Shaukat Hayat Khan. Khurshid Anwar of the Muslim League National Guard was dispatched to the Frontier to mobilise the Pashtun tribes for an armed attack.
- 13 September 1947: Pakistan accepted the accession of the Junagadh State. The Poonch rebels in Murree began to lobby Jinnah with telegrams: "Atrocious military oppression in Poonch.... Kindly intervene."
- 13 September 1947: Vallabhbhai Patel approved the request from Jammu and Kashmir for the secondment of Col. Kashmir Singh Katoch. He was intended to head the State forces upon the departure of General Henry Lawrence Scott. However, in the event, he was only appointed as the military advisor to the Maharaja.
- 13 September 1947 – 18 September 1947: Justice Mehr Chand Mahajan visited Kashmir and accepted the Maharaja's invitation to be the prime minister of the state.
- 19 September 1947: The Muslim Conference acting president Choudhri Hamidullah and general secretary Ishaque Qureshi were summoned by Pakistani prime minister Liaquat Ali Khan and briefed about Pakistan's invasion plans.
- 19 September 1947: Mahajan met Jawaharlal Nehru and Vallabhbhai Patel in Delhi and apprised them of the situation in the state. He indicated the Maharaja's willingness to accede to India but asked for political reforms to be delayed. Nehru demanded the release of Sheikh Abdullah.
- 20 September 1947: According to Sardar Ibrahim, a people's militia of 50,000 ex-servicemen had been raised to form an 'Azad Army'.
- 22 September 1947: Muslim Conference convention at Srinagar took a decision favouring accession to Pakistan.
- 26 September 1947: The Pakistan Times reported that the Maharaja had decided to accede to India two weeks previously.
- 26 September 1947: Civil & Military Gazette reported on the 'Exodus of Muslims from Jammu'. 50,000 Muslims were said to have migrated to West Punjab, halving Jammu city's Muslim population.
- 27 September 1947: Nehru wrote to Vallabhbhai Patel predicting a Pakistani incursion into Kashmir. He recommended that the Maharaja "make friends" with the National Conference.
- 29 September 1947: Sheikh Abdullah was released from prison. Henry Lawrence Scott, the Chief of Staff of the State Forces left his position. About 100,000 Muslims from East Punjab and an equal number of non-Muslims from West Punjab were safely escorted through Jammu by the State Forces.
- 30 September 1947: Nehru proposed using plebiscite as a means of settling disputes regarding princely states. It was discussed in the Indian Cabinet and then communicated to Pakistani Prime Minister Liaquat Ali Khan in Delhi. Khan's eyes were said to have "sparkled" at the proposal, though he made no response.

=== October 1947 ===
- 1 October 1947: Dwarkanath Kachru, the secretary general of the All-India States Peoples' Conference, visited Kashmir for four days. He reported to Nehru that the National Conference had decided in favour of accession to India.
- 3 October 1947: Khwaja Ghulam Nabi Gilkar, under the assumed name "Mr. Anwar", issued the proclamation of a provisional 'Azad Kashmir' government in Muzaffarabad. This government failed with the arrest of Gilkar in Srinagar.
- 6 October 1947: An armed rebellion began in Poonch.
- 6 October 1947: The Maharaja replaced Chief of State Forces Banbury and Police Chief Powell with Hindu officers.
- 7 October 1947: The Maharaja imposed rigorous precensorship of the press, especially of all views regarding the State's accession.
- 8 October 1947 – 9 October 1947: The Owen Pattan post on Jhelum river was captured by rebels. Sehnsa and Throchi were abandoned by State Forces after attack.
- 8 October 1947 – 9 October 1947: Pakistani raids on the borders of Jammu and Kathua districts began.
- 10 October 1947: Sardar Vallabhbhai Patel expedited Justice Mahajan's leave from Punjab High Court, which enabled him to accept the Prime Ministership. Mahajan visited Indian leaders and Lord Mountbatten in Delhi before proceeding to Srinagar.
- 12 October 1947: K. H. Khurshid, Jinnah's private secretary, was sent to Kashmir to mobilise support for Pakistan, and reported: "Muslim Conference is now practically a dead organisation." He advocated Pakistan to use force, and "supply arms and foodstuff to the tribes within and without the state."
- 14 October 1947: Some activists of the Rashtriya Swayamsevak Sangh and the Akalis mounted attacks on villages of the Jammu district, which killed Muslims and set houses on fire, stated to be the beginning of the 1947 Jammu violence.
- 15 October 1947: Mehr Chand Mahajan took charge as Prime Minister of the state. Concentration of tribesmen reported at Abbottabad-Mansehra.
- 17 October 1947: Brigadier N.S. Rawat given the charge of the Jammu Brigade of the State Forces, and Brigadier Khuda Baksh made Chief of Staff, second in command.
- 17 October 1947 – 18 October 1947: A battalion of Patiala State Forces arrives in Jammu and a mountain battery (artillery regiment) is stationed in Srinagar.
- 18 October 1947: Sheikh Abdullah attended the meeting of the Standing Committee of All India States Peoples Conference in Delhi.
- 19 October 1947 – 22 October 1947: The Maharaja and the new prime minister travelled to Jammu province and investigated the Pakistani border raids, visiting Jammu (19 October), Bhimber (20 October), Kathua (21 October) and returning to Srinagar on 22 October.
- 20 October 1947: Lorries carrying 900 Mahsud tribesmen departed the Frontier tribal region heading to Kashmir. Governor George Cunningham sent a letter to Indian Army Chief Gen. Rob Lockhart warning him about the invasion; the letter was received on 23 or 24 October.
- 21 October 1947: The Maharaja appointed Bakshi Tek Chand, a retired judge of the Punjab High Court, to frame a constitution for the state. This stalled due to the impending invasion.
- 21 October 1947: Dak Bungalow at Bhimber was attacked by rebels. There were accusations that this was an effort to kill or abduct the Maharaja, who was scheduled to visit that day.
- 21 October 1947: Journalist G. K. Reddy, working for Associated Press of India (API) in Lahore, received a telephone call from the Pakistan Army Headquarters in Rawalpindi, stating that the Ramkot post was being attacked that night, and the news should be published as coming from Palandri.
- 21 October 1947 – 22 October 1947: Pakistan precipitated the first Indo-Pakistani War when it launched a tribal lashkar (levy) from Waziristan to overthrow the Maharaja's government. Thousands of Pashtuns from Pakistan's North West Frontier Province, recruited covertly by the Pakistani Army, invaded Kashmir along with the Poonch rebels, allegedly incensed by atrocities against fellow Muslims in Poonch and Jammu. The tribesmen engaged in looting and killing along the way. Pro-Pakistan members of the Maharaja's army rebelled at Domel (Muzaffarabad) and took control of the Jhelum river bridge.
- 22 October 1947: All the Muslim members of the State Police in Jammu City were disarmed and ordered to go to Pakistan.
- 24 October 1947: New Delhi received the news of tribal invasion via two channels, from General Gracey of Pakistan Army communicated to General Lockhart and from R.L. Batra, the Deputy Prime Minister of Jammu and Kashmir, to Nehru. Batra carried a message from the Maharaja which requested military assistance and proposed accession to India.
- 24 October 1947: A second provisional government of Azad Kashmir was established under the leadership of Sardar Ibrahim with nominal headquarters at Palandri.
- 24 October 1947: Bhimber fell to rebels after an attack by armoured vehicles of the Pakistan Army.
- 25 October 1947: A Defence Committee meeting in Delhi, headed by Lord Mountbatten, considered the Maharaja's request. Ministers were unanimous in sending military assistance, but disagreed on whether to accept Kashmir's accession. The secretary of the States Department, V. P. Menon, was sent to Kashmir to assess the situation.
- 26 October 1947: V. P. Menon brought news that the situation in Kashmir was critical and that the Maharaja was ready to agree to "any terms". The accession was accepted on the condition of a future ratification by the people and the appointment Sheikh Abdullah to the government. The Maharaja moved from Srinagar to Jammu, his winter capital.
- 26 October 1947 – 27 October 1947: The Maharaja signed the Instrument of Accession (IOA), acceding the state to the Indian Union. India accepted the accession, regarding it provisional until such time as the will of the people could be ascertained.
- 27 October 1947: The Indian army entered the state to repel the invaders. Sheikh Abdullah endorsed the accession but termed it ad hoc and to be ultimately decided by the people of Jammu and Kashmir. He was appointed head of the emergency administration.
- 27 October 1947: Mohammad Ali Jinnah ordered General Douglas Gracey to send Pakistani troops into Kashmir. Gracey declined, pointing out the fact of Kashmir's accession to India. Gracey had a 'stand down order' from Supreme Commander Claude Auchinleck to the effect that, in the event of an inter-Dominion war, all the British officers in both the armies must stand down.
- 27 October 1947: The Kashmir Liberation Committee was formed to manage Pakistan's conduct of the war. It was headed by Prime Minister Liaquat Ali Khan, with Colonel Akbar Khan as the military member, Ghulam Muhammad, the finance minister, and Sardar Ibrahim, the president of the provisional Azad Kashmir government.
- 28 October 1947: Field Marshal Auchinleck flew to Lahore to explain the stand down order to Jinnah. Upon his suggestion, Jinnah invited the Indian leaders for a conference in Lahore but the Indian Cabinet declined the invitation.
- 29 October 1947: Jinnah and Liaquat Ali Khan entered the war officially by deciding to maintain a force of at least 5,000 tribesmen in Kashmir. Tribesmen again poured into Kashmir.
- 31 October 1947: Sheikh Abdullah was appointed as the head of the Emergency Administration in Kashmir.
- 31 October 1947: Major William Brown, the commander of the Gilgit Scouts, led a coup against the governor of Gilgit and imprisoned him. A provisional government was declared by the rebels.

=== November 1947 ===
- 1 November 1947: Lord Mountbatten and Mohammad Ali Jinnah met in Lahore, as the Governors General of India and Pakistan. Mountbatten offered India's proposal that the accession of Junagadh, Hyderabad and Kashmir should be decided by an impartial reference to the will of the people in the form of a plebiscite. Jinnah rejected the offer.
- Early November: Sheikh Abdullah recommended that India give an ultimatum and declare war against Pakistan upon the expiry of the ultimatum. Nehru did not favour a broader war.
- 3 November 1947: Tribesmen broke through to within 5 miles (8.0 km) of the Srinagar airport and were beaten back. Indians suffered heavy casualties. Indian Home Minister Vallabhbhai Patel argued for the army to be reinforced; two more battalions were air-lifted, and a squadron of armoured cars and field artillery were dispatched from Pathankot.
- 3 November 1947: Mendhar, in the eastern part of the Poonch district fell to rebels; Bagh and Rawalakot followed in quick succession. Hindu and Sikh refugees from these areas took shelter in Nowshera, Mirpur, Kotli and Poonch, which were all surrounded by rebels.
- 5 November 1947: Most of the tribesmen withdrew to Uri in the face of the Indian assault. Many returned home, sensing that the fight was lost.
- 5 November 1947 – 6 November 1947: Convoys of Muslim refugees from Jammu going to West Punjab were attacked by armed bands supported by State troops; very few survived. 6 November became a remembrance day in Pakistan and Azad Kashmir.
- 7 November 1947: Reinforced Indian troops in the Kashmir Valley engaged the tribesmen at Shalateng and inflicted heavy casualties. The defeated tribal forces were pursued and Baramulla and Uri were recaptured.
- 7 November 1947: Rajouri was captured by Azad rebels. 30,000 Hindus and Sikhs gathered there were killed in the 1947 Rajouri Massacre before it was relieved, with the exception of 1,500 who escaped to the hills.
- 9 November 1947: An attack on a convoy of Muslim refugees from Jammu was repelled by Indian troops, killing 150 of the attackers. No further attacks on convoys were reported after this incident.
- 13 November 1947: Major General Kalwant Singh issued an order to the 50 Para Brigade to relieve Nowshera, Jhangar, Mirpur, Kotli and Poonch in seven days. The ambitious plan was criticised by General Roy Bucher.
- 16 November 1947: Pakistan's Political Agent, Khan Mohammad Alam Khan, arrived in Gilgit and took over the administration. The provisional government was dismissed.
- 17 November 1947: The Jammu Praja Parishad was formed with Hari Wazir as party president and Hansraj Pangotra as general secretary. Pandit Prem Nath Dogra and Balraj Madhok were also major founding members.
- 18 November 1947: 50 Para Brigade relieved Nowshera.
- 25 November 1947: Mirpur fell to rebels. 20,000 Hindus and Sikhs taking shelter at the town were killed in the 1947 Mirpur Massacre during the rebel occupation. The day is remembered as the "Mirpur day" in Indian-administered Jammu.
- 26 November 1947: 50 Para Brigade relieved Kotli, but evacuated it the next day due to the difficulty of defending it against the surrounding rebels.
- 26 November 1947 – 27 November 1947: During Liaquat Ali Khan's visit to Delhi for a Joint Defence Council meeting, the two countries reached an agreement on the sharing of sterling balances. A tentative agreement on Kashmir was reached; Pakistan agreed to use its influence on the raiders to withdraw, India to scale back its troops, and the UN to be approached for holding a plebiscite. However, the agreement was vetoed by Jinnah: "No commitments should be made without my approval of terms of settlement. Mr. Liaquat has agreed and promised to abide by this understanding," read his note to the ministers. The next day, India's Defence Committee was informed that Pakistan was reinforcing the tribesmen.
- 28 November 1947: Horace Alexander estimated that 200,000 Muslims had been affected by the anti-Muslim violence in Jammu. Mahatma Gandhi spoke about it in his prayer meeting, and reproached Sheikh Abdullah for not curtailing the Maharaja's powers.
- 30 November 1947: Large concentrations of insurgents were reported at Sialkot, Gujrat and Jhelum.

=== December 1947 ===
- December 1947: Liaquat Ali Khan visited the Azad staging areas in the Sialkot District and was enraged by the reports of atrocities narrated by the Azad rebels. He issued a renewed call to arms.
- 4 December 1947: The British Commander-in-Chief of the Pakistan Army sanctioned military involvement in the Kashmir War. One million rounds of ammunition and twelve volunteer officers were provided.
- 8 December 1947: A meeting between Nehru and Liaquat Ali Khan, along with ministers and Lord Mountbatten, was deadlocked. Mountbatten proposed that the UN be invited to break the deadlock.
- 15 December 1947 – 20 December 1947: Indian forces lost ground and Nehru contemplated escalating the war across the international border to strike against the raider's bases, but decides against it.
- 20 December 1947: Mountbatten recommended India take the matter to the UN, where he says it would have a "cast-iron case". He believed the UN would promptly direct Pakistan to withdraw. The proposal was discussed in the Indian Cabinet.
- 22 December 1947: Nehru handed Liaquat Ali Khan a formal letter demanding that Pakistan deny assistance to the raiders.
- 24 December 1947: Indian forces were evicted from Jhangar by rebels. However, they repelled the attack on Nowshera by 27 December. India reinforced Kashmir by an additional brigade.
- 27 December 1947: British Commonwealth Minister Philip Noel-Baker considered it a "political miscalculation" by India that the UN Security Council would condemn Pakistan as an aggressor. The events before Kashmir's accession would also come into play. He predicted that the question of plebiscite would be the focus of the Security Council.
- 28 December 1947 – 30 December 1947: Mountbatten urged Nehru "to stop the fighting and to stop it as soon as possible". Exchanges between Mountbatten and Nehru were passed on to the British government, which was advised that any Indian defeat in the Kashmir valley would immediately lead to a broader war. Prime Minister Attlee warned Nehru that opening a broader war would jeopardise India's case in the UN. Britain alerted the US, which requested clarifications from the Indian government.
- 31 December 1947: India referred the Kashmir problem to the UN Security Council.
- 31 December 1947: The British Commonwealth Relations Office (CRO) asked its permanent representative at the UN, Alexander Cadogan, about the validity of Indian claims. Cadogan responded that India was entitled to charge Pakistan as an aggressor under Article 35 and to take measures for self-defence under Article 51, including "pursuing invaders into Pakistan".

== 1948: War and diplomacy ==
=== January 1948 ===
- 1 January 1948: UN Security Council considered the Kashmir problem.
- January 1948: 'Balawaristan' insurrection in Gilgit by the local people. It was put down by the Gilgit forces.
- 2 January 1948: The British Cabinet decided to send a special delegation to handle the Kashmir issue in the Security Council, sidestepping Alexander Cadogan. Commonwealth Relations Minister Philip Noel-Baker
- 10 January 1948: Noel-Baker put forward the British proposals to the US State Department: Kashmir to be put under an "impartial administration" headed by a UN-appointed chairman; India–Pakistan joint military forces, along with UN troops, to operate under a UN-appointed commander-in-chief. He failed to win US support for these proposals.
- 15 January 1948: India and Pakistan made presentations to the UN Security Council. While India reiterated its demands in the original referral, Pakistan made wide-ranging allegations against India including 'genocide' against Muslims in various places in India, unlawful occupation of Junagadh and other issues. Pakistan demanded the withdrawal of both the raiders and the Indians from Kashmir.
- 17 January 1948: UN Security Council passed Resolution 38 which called upon India and Pakistan to refrain from aggravating the situation and requested they inform the Council of any "material changes" in the situation.
- 20 January 1948: UN Security Council passed Resolution 39 which announced a 3-member commission to investigate the Kashmir dispute. However the Commission did not come into fruition until May 1948.
- 28 January 1948: Sheikh Abdullah, as a member of the Indian delegation to the Security Council, met US delegate Warren Austin and raised the possibility of independence for Kashmir. At this stage, the US showed no interest in further fragmentation of India.
- January 1948: Noel-Baker won the support of the Western powers in the Security Council—the US, Canada and France—for the Pakistani position that the raiders cannot be withdrawn without a change of government in Kashmir. Draft resolutions were formulated along the lines of the 10 January proposals.

=== February–April 1948 ===
- 3 February 1948: India requested an adjournment of the Security Council discussions. The Indian Cabinet was said to be in favour of withdrawing the UN referral unless greater consideration was shown to India's complaints.
- 9 February 1948 – 11 February 1948: Gilgit rebels attacked Skardu. The State forces at Skardu defended it for almost six months afterwards. No reinforcements were possible due to closure of the Zoji La pass by winter snows. The Ladakhis appealed to Nehru for help.
- 12 February 1948: Security Council discussions were adjourned.
- 27 February 1948 – 28 February 1948: Serious differences arose between the US and UK delegations in their approach to the Kashmir resolution. The US insisted on Pakistan's obligation to stop the assistance to the raiders, favoured keeping the interim government of Kashmir in place, and limited the role of the UN commission to the conduct of the plebiscite. However, the US refrained from making its views public.
- 27 February 1948: The Commonwealth Affairs Committee of the British Cabinet discussed the Kashmir question for the first time. Patrick Gordon Walker, the Parliamentary Under-Secretary for Commonwealth Relations, disagreed with Noel-Baker and proposed a 'completely neutral' attitude on the part of the UK. The committee formulated a new approach, overriding Noel-Baker.
- 7 March 1948: A small group of Indian troops crossed through the treacherous Zoji La pass, reaching Leh with guns and ammunition to raise a local volunteer force.
- 10 March 1948: : Security Council deliberations resumed.
- 18 March 1948: The Republic of China, as the current Chair of the Security Council, tabled a resolution in three parts: restoration of peace by calling upon Pakistan to withdraw the raiders, request that India appoint a plebiscite administration with UN-nominated directors, and a request that India broaden the interim government with representatives from all major political groups.
- 21 March 1948: UN Security Council passed Resolution 47 which called for a three-step process for the resolution of the dispute: Pakistani withdrawal of its nationals, India to reduce its troops to minimum level, and arrangements for a plebiscite. The UN Commission, which was proposed in January, was enlarged from three to five members under the name of United Nations Commission for India and Pakistan (UNCIP). Both India and Pakistan rejected the resolution but promised to work with the Commission.

=== May 1948 ===
- 10 May 1948: Operation Sledge – Four columns of insurgents struck Indian lines of communication at Gund, Pandras, Dras and Kargil, and all except Gund were captured. The Indian land route to Skardu and Leh was severed.
- 22 May 1948: India established an air link to Leh.

=== July 1948 ===
- 5 July 1948: UNCIP arrived in the subcontinent. In Karachi, it was told by Pakistan that three brigades of regular Pakistan Army were operating in Kashmir, a "bombshell" of news according to Josef Korbel. In Delhi, the Commission was told that it needed to recognize the aggression by Pakistan. The Commission broached the possibility of partition, considered favourably by India but rejected by Pakistan.
- 6 July 1948: In response to an appeal by the UNCIP, India limited its operations to clearing the land route to Leh and relieving Poonch.

=== August–December 1948 ===
- 13 August 1948: UNCIP adopted its first resolution on Kashmir, fine-tuning the April resolution of the Security Council to take into account objections by both India and Pakistan. Pakistan's aggression was indirectly acknowledged by asking for its withdrawal as the first step. The resolution was accepted by India, but effectively rejected by Pakistan.
- 14 August 1948: State forces at Skardu fell after eight months of siege.
- 21 September 1948: After sustained negotiations with India and Pakistan, UNCIP left for Zurich to write an interim report to the UN Security Council.
- 1 November 1948: Zoji La pass was recaptured by India.
- 15 November 1948: Dras was recaptured.
- 20 November 1948: Two Indian columns linked at Poonch, relieving the pressure on the garrison.
- 23 November 1948: Kargil was recaptured.
- 14 December 1948: A major attack was made by the regular Pakistan army on the Indian line of communications at Beripattan-Nowshera.

== 1949–1962: Plebiscite conundrum ==
=== 1949 ===
- 1 January 1949: A ceasefire between Indian and Pakistani forces left India in control of the Kashmir Valley, most of the Jammu province and Ladakh, while Pakistan gained control of the western districts comprising the present day Azad Kashmir, the Gilgit Agency and Baltistan.
- 5 January 1949: UNCIP stated that the question of the accession of the State of Jammu and Kashmir to India or Pakistan would be decided through a free and impartial plebiscite. As per the 1948 and 1949 UNCIP Resolutions, both countries accepted the principle that Pakistan would secure the withdrawal of Pakistani intruders followed by withdrawal of Pakistani and Indian forces, as a basis for the formulation of a truce agreement, the details of which were to be determined, followed by a plebiscite. However, the countries failed to arrive at a truce agreement due to differences in interpretation of the procedure for and extent of demilitarisation, one of them being whether the Azad Kashmiri army was to be disbanded during the truce stage or the plebiscite stage.
- 1949: Jammu Praja Parishad launched an agitation calling for the full integration of Jammu and Kashmir with India. 294 members of the party were arrested.
- 28 April 1949: Azad Kashmir signed the Karachi Agreement with Pakistan, which ceded control over defence and foreign affairs and complete control over Gilgit-Baltistan. The agreement was kept secret until 1990.
- 16 June 1949: Nominated by the Maharaja, Sheikh Abdullah and his colleagues joined the Constituent Assembly of India
- 20 June 1949: Maharaja Hari Singh announced his decision to abdicate and appointed his son Karan Singh as the Prince Regent.
- 17 October 1949: The Indian Constituent Assembly adopted Article 370 of the Constitution, ensuring a special status and internal autonomy for Jammu and Kashmir, with Indian jurisdiction in Kashmir limited to the three areas agreed in the Instrument of Accession: defence, foreign affairs and communications.

=== 1950 ===
- May 1950: UN mediator, Sir Owen Dixon, arrived in the subcontinent.
- July 1950: India–Pakistan summit in the presence of Owen Dixon failed to make progress. After the summit, Dixon received a tentative proposal from Nehru for a "partition cum plebiscite": a plebiscite to be held in the Kashmir Valley and the remaining state to be partitioned as per prevailing control.
- August 1950: Liaquat Ali Khan accepted the partition-cum-plebiscite principle provided India agreed to put the state under neutral administration. India rejected any idea of replacing the National Conference administration. Dixon reported failure.
- 1950: At the end of the year, Jehadist rhetoric inflamed Pakistan and continued into 1951.

=== 1951 ===
- June 1951: India moved troops to the India–Pakistan border in response to the rhetoric from Pakistan. A military stand-off ensued. Pakistan regarded India's behaviour as "aggressive". Liaquat Ali Khan displayed a clenched fist in defiance.
- September 1951 – October 1951: Elections were held for the Constituent Assembly of Jammu and Kashmir, with 75 seats allocated to the Indian-administered part of Kashmir and 25 seats reserved for the Pakistan-administered part. Sheikh Abdullah's National Conference won all 75 seats in a rigged election. The UN Security Council passed Resolution 91 to the effect that such elections did not substitute a plebiscite.

=== 1952 ===
- October 1951: Jammu Praja Parishad became an affiliate of the newly founded Bharatiya Jana Sangh, the precursor of the Bharatiya Janata Party.
- November 1951: The Constituent Assembly passed legislation stripping the Maharaja of all powers and making the government answerable to the Assembly.
- January 1952 – June 1952: Jammu Praja Parishad renewed agitation and called for the full integration of the state with India. The army was called to impose order and several hundred activists were imprisoned. Jana Sangh and other Hindu nationalist parties staged a demonstration outside the Indian Parliament in support of the Praja Parishad.
- January 1952 – June 1952: Sheikh Abdullah veers around to the position of demanding self-determination for Kashmiris, having previously endorsed accession to India (c.1947). In his Ranbirsinghpura speech in April, he questioned the state's continued accession to India.
- June 1952: State Constituent Assembly considered a proposal for abolishing the hereditary monarchy.
- July 1952: Sheikh Abdullah signed the Delhi Agreement with the Indian government on Centre-State relationship, which provided for the autonomy of the State within India and the autonomy for regions within the State.
- November 1952: The Constituent Assembly adopted a resolution which abolished the monarchy and replaced it with an elected Sadar-i-Riyasat (Head of State). The Prince Regent Karan Singh was elected to the position.
- November 1952: Jammu Praja Parishad relaunched its agitation campaign for a third time. The Jana Sangh and other Hindu nationalist parties launched a parallel agitation in Delhi, which supported the Praja Parishad. Two days after a Hartal (Voluntary shutdown protest) in Jammu, Praja Parishad president Prem Nath Dogra and general secretary Sham Lal Sharma were arrested.
- 14 December 1952: A "Satyagrahi" named Mela Ram was shot and killed by police in Chhamb while attempting to hoist the Indian national flag. It is estimated over 30,000 individuals came to his funeral in mourning and in support of the movement.

=== 1953 ===
- May 1953: Jana Sangh leader Syama Prasad Mukherjee made a bid to enter Jammu and Kashmir, citing his rights as an Indian citizen. He was promptly arrested at the Jammu border. In a widespread agitation in Jammu, Punjab and Delhi, 10,000 activists were imprisoned.
- May 1953: Abdullah headed a subcommittee of the National Conference which recommended four options for the state's future, all involving a plebiscite or independence. Abdullah remained firm in negotiations with the central government regarding centre–state relations.
- 2 June 1953: Pakistani prime minister Muhammad Ali Bogra and Nehru meet in London.
- 23 June 1953: Syama Prasad Mukherjee died in prison. Large protests were held in Delhi and other parts of the country.
- 25 July 1953: Bilateral talks between Pakistan and India in Karachi.
- August 1953: The National Conference working committee recommendations were opposed by three of Abdullah's five-member cabinet, including Deputy Prime Minister Bakshi Ghulam Mohammad. They were further strengthened by the communist faction led by G. M. Sadiq. They informed Sadr-i-Riyasat Karan Singh that Abdullah had lost the majority within the cabinet.
- 8 August 1953: Sheikh Abdullah was dismissed by Sadr-i-Riyasat and later arrested. Bakshi Ghulam Mohammed was appointed as the new prime minister.
- 16 August 1953: Bilateral talks between Pakistan and India in Delhi. The two countries agreed to appoint a Plebiscite Administrator within six months. A plebiscite was to be held in all regions and the state partitioned on the basis of the results.
- September 1953: Following reports of a US-Pakistan alliance, Nehru warned Pakistan that it had to choose between winning Kashmir through plebiscite and forming a military alliance with the United States.

=== 1954 ===
- February 1954: The Constituent Assembly, under the leadership of Bakshi Ghulam Mohammad, passed a resolution ratifying the accession of Kashmir to India.
- May 1954: Pakistan and US signed a mutual defence assistance agreement. Nehru withdrew the plebiscite offer to Pakistan. He stated his concerns about the cold-war alignments and that such an alliance affects the Kashmir issue. India resisted plebiscite efforts from this point.

=== 1955–1957 ===
- February 1955 – 1956: The violent 1955 Poonch uprising erupted in Poonch Division in Pakistan administered Jammu and Kashmir as a result of the dismissal of Sardar Ibrahim Khan. The uprising was most severe in Rawalakot and Pallandri.
- August 1955: Sheikh Abdullah's lieutenant Mirza Afzal Beg formed the Plebiscite Front to fight for the plebiscite demand and the unconditional release of Sheikh Abdullah who was arrested after his dismissal.
- 17 November 1956: The state Constituent Assembly adopted a constitution for the state which declared it an integral part of the Indian Union.
- 24 January 1957: The UN Security Council passed Resolution 122 which stated that the state constitution was not a final legal disposition of the State. India's Home Minister, Pandit Govind Ballabh Pant, during his visit to Srinagar, declared that the State of Jammu and Kashmir was an integral part of India and there can be no question of a plebiscite to determine its status afresh. India continued to resist plebiscite efforts.
- 1957: Elections were held for the first Legislative Assembly. National Conference won 69 of the 75 seats, where 47 seats were unopposed. Bakshi Ghulam Mohammad continued as prime minister.
- 8 August 1958: Sheikh Abdullah was arrested in the Kashmir Conspiracy Case.

=== 1959–1962 ===
- 1959: China annexed Tibet. Tensions rose between China and India on the issue of the boundary between Tibet and India, especially in Aksai Chin.
- 1962: Elections were held for the second Legislative Assembly. The National Conference won 68 of the 74 seats.

== 1963–1987: Rise of Kashmiri nationalism ==
=== 1963–1969 ===
- March 1963: The Chinese government signed an agreement with Pakistan on the boundary between the Northern Areas and the Xinjiang province, ceding the Trans-Karakoram Tract.
- 27 December 1963 – 4 January 1964: A mass uprising occurred in the Kashmir Valley when the holy relic was found missing from the Hazratbal Shrine; the lost relic was recovered after a few days.
- 30 December 1963: The Jammu Praja Parishad officially merged with the Bharatiya Jan Sangh, who continued to push the original demands of the Parishad.
- 8 April 1964: The government dropped all charges in the Kashmir Conspiracy Case. Sheikh Abdullah was released after 11 years.
- 21 November 1964 – 24 November 1964: Articles 356 and 357 of the Indian Constitution were extended to the State, by virtue of which the Central Government can assume the government of the State and exercise its legislative powers. The State Assembly then amended the State Constitution, changing the posts of Sadr-i-Riyasat and "prime minister" to Governor and "chief minister", consistent with the Indian Constitution. Scholar Sumantra Bose regarded it the "end of the road" for Article 370 and the constitutional autonomy guaranteed by it.
- 3 January 1965: The Jammu and Kashmir National Conference dissolved itself and merged into the Indian National Congress, a centralising strategy.
- August 1965 – 23 September 1965: Indo-Pakistani War of 1965: Pakistan took advantage of the discontent in the Kashmir Valley and sent a few thousand armed Pakistani infiltrators across the cease-fire line in Operation Gibraltar. Incidents of violence increased in Kashmir Valley, and a full Indo-Pakistani war broke out until a ceasefire was made.
- 1966: On 10 January, the Tashkent Declaration was signed by both countries, agreeing to revert to their pre-1965 positions under Russian mediation. Pakistan-supported guerrilla groups in Kashmir increased their activities after the ceasefire. Kashmiri nationalists Amanullah Khan and Maqbool Bhat formed another Plebiscite Front with an armed wing called the Jammu and Kashmir National Liberation Front (NLF) in Azad Kashmir, with the objective of freeing Kashmir from Indian occupation.

=== 1970–1979 ===
- 1972: India and Pakistan agreed to respect the cease-fire as Line of Control (LOC).
- 2 July 1972: India and Pakistan signed the Simla Agreement which stated that the final settlement of Kashmir would be decided bilaterally in the future and that both sides would respect the LOC.
- 1974: The 1927 State Subject law was officially abolished in Gilgit Baltistan, allowing Pakistanis to settle and buy land.
- 24 February 1975: The Indira-Sheikh accord was reached in February between Indian Prime Minister Indira Gandhi and Sheikh Abdullah. The Plebiscite Front was dissolved and renamed the National Conference. Sheikh Abdullah assumed the position of Chief Minister of Jammu and Kashmir after an 11-year gap.
- 1976: Maqbool Bhat was arrested on his return to Kashmir.
- 17 June 1977: Mid-term elections were called by the government. Sheikh Abdullah's National Conference won a majority in what was regarded as the first "free and fair" election in the State. Abdullah was re-elected as the chief minister on 9 July.
- May 1977: Jammu and Kashmir Liberation Front (JKLF) was founded in the United Kingdom by converting the UK chapter of the Plebiscite Front. Amanullah Khan was elected as its General Secretary the following year.
- 1979: The USSR invaded Afghanistan. The US and Pakistan became involved in training, recruiting, arming, and unleashing the Mujahideen on Afghanistan. The Mujahideen so recruited would, in the late 1980s, take on their own agenda of establishing Islamic rule in Kashmir.

=== 1980–1986 ===
- 1980: Pakistani President Zia ul-Haq sought help from the chief of Jamaat-e-Islami in Azad Kashmir for raising an insurgency in Indian-administered Kashmir. He promised to divert funds and resources from the American-sponsored insurgency in Afghanistan. The chief Maulana Abdul Bari travelled to Indian-administered Kashmir and conferred with the Jamaat-e-Islami Kashmir, telling them "you will have to do the fighting and they [Pakistan] will provide all assistance."
- 8 September 1982: Sheikh Abdullah died. His son, Farooq Abdullah, later assumed office as Chief Minister of J&K.
- May 1983: The chief of Jamaat-e-Islami Kashmir, Maulana Saaduddin Tarabali, struck a deal with Pakistani president Zia ul-Haq for conducting an armed insurgency. The first group of volunteers were sent to Pakistan-administered Kashmir for training in militancy.
- September 1983: Ansarul Islam, possibly the first Islamist militant group in Kashmir and a precursor to the Hizbul Mujahideen, was founded by Hilal Ahmed Mir. In 1985–86, it started sending members to Pakistan and Afghanistan for armed training.
- 6 February 1984: The Indian consul general in Birmingham, Ravindra Mhatre, was abducted by JKLF militants and murdered. India hanged Maqbool Bhat soon afterward.
- April 1984: Prime minister Indira Gandhi appointed Jagmohan as the Governor of Jammu and Kashmir. She apprehended that the security situation in the state was due to turn to worse.
- 13 April 1984: The Indian Army captured the Siachen Glacier region of Kashmir during Operation Meghdoot.
- July 1984: Farooq Abdullah's government in Jammu and Kashmir was toppled by engineering defections. His brother-in-law G. M. Shah became the chief minister with the support of the Congress party.
- September 1984: Pakistan's ISI, frustrated with the sluggishness of Jamaat-e-Islami Kashmir, sought a relationship with JKLF. Negotiations continued till 1986–87.
- 1986: JKLF's Farooq Haider and Raja Muzaffar agreed to partner with Pakistan's ISI to start an armed insurgency in Kashmir. Rauf Kashmiri was sent to Kashmir to explore opportunities.
- February 1986 - March 1986: The 1986 Anantnag riots broke out. Properties and homes of Kashmiri Hindus were attacked and numerous Hindu Temples were vandalised and set on fire.
- March 1986: G. M. Shah's government was dismissed due to deteriorating law and order situation in Jammu and Kashmir and Governor's Rule was declared, to be headed by Jagmohan.
- December 1986: Amanullah Khan and Hashim Qureshi were expelled from the UK and returned to Pakistan. Amanullah Khan approved the partnership with ISI in May 1987.

== 1987–present: Kashmir Insurgency ==
=== 1987–1989 ===
- 1987: Farooq Abdullah won the Assembly elections. The Muslim United Front (MUF) alleged that the elections had been rigged. The insurgency in the Kashmir Valley increased in momentum following this event. The MUF candidate, Mohammad Yousuf Shah, a victim of the rigging and state's mistreatment, took the name Syed Salahuddin and would become chief of the militant outfit Hizb-ul-Mujahideen. His election aides called the HAJY group - Abdul Hamid Shaikh, Ashfaq Majid Wani, Javed Ahmed Mir and Mohammed Yasin Malik - would join the JKLF.
- 16 May 1988 - 18 May 1988: Multiple groups of radical Sunnis, led by Osama bin Laden (supported by Pervez Musharraf, General Zia-ul Haq and Mirza Aslam Beg) massacre hundreds of Shias in the 1988 Gilgit Massacre.
- 31 July 1988: De facto launch of the Kashmir insurgency by the Jammu and Kashmir Liberation Front (JKLF) with four attempted bombings in the Kashmir Valley. Two were successful. The group that carried out was Al-Hamza.
- 1989: The end of the Soviet occupation of Afghanistan released a great deal of militant energy and weapons to Kashmir. Pakistan provided arms and training to both indigenous and foreign militants in Kashmir.
- 1989: Mass Exodus of Kashmiri Hindus started in Kashmir Valley

=== 1990–1999 ===
- January 1990: Jagmohan was appointed Governor. Farooq Abdullah resigned.
- 21 January 1990: An estimated 50 people were killed when a large group of unarmed protesters were fired upon by Indian troops at the Gawkadal bridge.
- 1 March 1990: An estimated one million took to the streets and more than 40 people were killed in police firing.
- 13 February 1990: Lassa Kaul, director of Srinagar Doordarshan, was killed by the militants for implementing pro-Indian media policy.
- February 1990 – March 1990: Though the JKLF tried to explain that the killings of Pandits were not communal, the murders caused a scare among the minority Hindu community. The rise of new militant groups and unexplained killings of members of the community contributed to an atmosphere of insecurity for the Kashmiri Pandits. Joint reconciliation efforts by members from Muslim and Pandit communities were actively discouraged by Jagmohan.
- 1990–present: An officially estimated 10,000 Kashmiri youths crossed into Pakistan for training and procurement of arms. Indigenous and foreign militant groups besides pro-India renegade militants proliferated through the 1990s with an estimated half a million Indian security forces deployed in the Kashmir Valley. Increasing violence and human right violations by all sides led to tens of thousands of civilian casualties.
- 28 December 1991: The Kashmiri Hindu organisation Panun Kashmir adopts the Margdarshan resolution in Jammu for the establishment of a separate Union Territory in Kashmir for Kashmiri Hindus, known as Panun Kashmir. The day is referred to as Homeland Day.
- 1998–present: Operation Sadbhavana (Goodwill) launched officially by the Indian army in Jammu and Kashmir.
- 3 May 1999 – 26 July 1999: Kargil War
- 13 July 1999: Terrorist entered to a residential complex of the Indian Border Security Forces and taken 12 hostages, after killing three officials. The hostages were freed at the next day.

=== 2001–2009 ===
- 14 July 2001 – 16 July 2001: General Pervez Musharraf and Atal Bihari Vajpayee met for peace talks.
- October 2001: : Kashmiri assembly in Srinagar was attacked, 38 fatalities.
- December 2001: The Indian Parliament in New Delhi was attacked.
- 11 September 2002: : Mushtaq Ahmed Lone, the Kashmir Law Minister was shot dead at an election rally in Kupwara, India, by armed terrorist diseguised with burkas, killing two of the minister´s bodyguardas and wounding five people more, for the attack, Lashkar-e-Taiba, Al Barq and Al-Arifeen each claimed the attack. Eight days later, militants shot a civilian worker Azad Ahad Khan in Srinagar, died from his wounds in a hospital.
- April 2003 – May 2003: Operation Sarp Vinash launched by the Indian army. The largest network of terrorist hideouts covering 100 square kilometers in Pir Panjal found and more than 60 terrorists killed.
- 2 May 2003: India and Pakistan restored diplomatic ties.
- 11 July 2003: : Delhi-Lahore bus service resumed.
- 1 April 2004: An explosive device blats at a government building in Srinagar, wounding one employer, trying to boycott the coutrywide elections in the region.
- 24 September 2004: Prime Minister Manmohan Singh and President Musharraf met in New York during UN General Assembly.
- 16 November 2005: Four civilians were killed and forty five were wounded, when a car bomb blasts near a bank branch in Lal Chowk, Srinagar. Al-Arifeen claimed the attack in a telephone call to the Kashmir News Service.
- July 2006: Second round of Indo-Pakistani peace talks were held.
- 22 August 2008: Following 2008 Kashmir unrest, hundreds of thousands of Muslims marched in Srinagar for independence, the largest protest against Indian rule in over a decade.

=== 2010–2018 ===
- June 2010: Following the killing of a young Kashmiri, Tufail Ahmad Mattoo, protest demonstrations continued in Kashmir for months.
- August 2012: The Chief Minister of Indian-administered Jammu and Kashmir, Omar Abdullah, said that the security situation was not yet conducive to the revoking of the Armed Forces Special Powers Act (AFSPA) in the state.
- September 2012: Indian President Pranab Mukherjee visited Indian-administered Jammu and Kashmir within two months of taking office. Despite the threat of protests from separatists (see Insurgency in Jammu and Kashmir) there were no security incidents.
- 25 November 2014 – 20 December 2014: Despite boycott calls by separatist Hurriyat leaders, the 2014 state election saw the highest voter turnout in the 25 years since insurgency erupted in the region. Indian authorities claimed that this was a vote of the Kashmiri people in favour of democracy of India.
- 8 July 2016: Following the killing of Burhan Muzaffar Wani on 8 July, violent protests broke out in Kashmir Valley. An imposed curfew continued, and more than 90 people were killed. Subsequently Operation All-Out was launched by the Indian security forces.
- July 2017 – present: Operation All-Out is an intensified offensive against the separatists, after the protests across the Valley. More than 50 civilians were killed, allegedly by Indian security forces in 2017.:

=== 2019–present ===
- 5 August 2019: The special status enjoyed by Jammu and Kashmir was revoked by the Government of India through Presidential orders backed by parliamentary resolutions. Simultaneously, the state was converted into a union territory, with Ladakh separated into a separate union territory, through the Jammu and Kashmir Reorganisation Act.
- 5 August 2019 – 5 February 2021: The entire state of Jammu and Kashmir was placed in a lockdown along with a communication blackout, ostensibly to prevent militant activity but also to prevent public protests according to commentators. At least 627 people were detained, including former chief ministers and other leaders.
- According to a 6 September 2019 report of the Indian government, nearly 4,000 people have been arrested and many were tortured. The report also claimed children were detained, which was later found to be false in December 2019. More than 200 politicians, including two former chief ministers of Jammu and Kashmir (J&K), along with more than 100 leaders and activists from All Parties Hurriyat Conference were detained in the disputed region.

== See also ==
- Human rights abuses in Jammu and Kashmir
  - Rape during the Kashmir conflict
  - Women's rights in Jammu and Kashmir
  - Stone Pelting in Kashmir
  - Exodus of Kashmiri Hindus
- Politics of Jammu and Kashmir
  - Elections in Jammu and Kashmir
- History of Kashmir
- Indo-Pakistani wars and conflicts
  - Kashmir conflict
  - Indo-Pakistani War of 1947
  - Sino-Indian War
  - Indo-Pakistani War of 1965
  - Indo-Pakistani War of 1971
  - Kargil War
  - 2001–02 India–Pakistan standoff
  - Siachen conflict
  - Insurgency in Jammu and Kashmir
  - India–Pakistan border skirmishes (2014–2015)
  - India–Pakistan military confrontation (2016–present)
  - 2016–17 Kashmir unrest
- Timeline of the Kashmir conflict (1846–1946)
- List of topics on the land and the people of "Jammu and Kashmir"
- List of massacres in Jammu and Kashmir

== Bibliography ==
- "History and Timeline of the Kashmir Conflict". kashmirlibrary.org. Archived from the original on 2 October 2010.
- Ankit, Rakesh (March 2010). "By George: The Cunningham Contribution". Epilogue. 4 (3): 46–50. Archived from the original on 15 November 2016.
- Ankit, Rakesh (April 2010), "Pandit Ramchandra Kak: The Forgotten Premier of Kashmir", Epilogue, 4 (4): 36–39
- Ankit, Rakesh (May 2010). "Henry Scott: The forgotten soldier of Kashmir". Epilogue. 4 (5): 44–49. Archived from the original on 10 May 2017.
- Ankit, Rakesh (November 2010). "October 1947". Epilogue. 4 (11): 9–12.
- Ankit, Rakesh (2013), "Britain and Kashmir, 1948: 'The Arena of the UN'", Diplomacy & Statecraft, 24 (2): 273–290, doi:10.1080/09592296.2013.789771, S2CID 154021048
- Bajwa, Kuldip Singh (2003), Jammu and Kashmir War, 1947–1948: Political and Military Perspective, Har-Anand Publications, ISBN 978-81-241-0923-6
- Baxter, Craig (2015), "The Jana Sangh", in Donald Eugene Smith (ed.), South Asian Politics and Religion, Princeton University Press, pp. 86–, ISBN 978-1-4008-7908-3
- Behera, Navnita Chadha (2007), Demystifying Kashmir, Pearson Education India, ISBN 978-8131708460
- Bhattacharya, Brigadier Samir (2013), NOTHING BUT!: Book Three: What Price Freedom, Partridge Publishing, ISBN 978-1-4828-1625-9
- Bose, Sumantra (2003), Kashmir: Roots of Conflict, Paths to Peace, Harvard University Press, ISBN 978-0-674-01173-1
- Brecher, Michael (1953), The Struggle for Kashmir, Oxford University Press
- Brown, William (2014), Gilgit Rebellion: The Major Who Mutinied Over Partition of India, Pen and Sword, ISBN 978-1-4738-4112-3
- Chattha, Ilyas (2011), Partition and Locality: Violence, Migration and Development in Gujranwala and Sialkot 1947–1961, Oxford University Press, ISBN 9780199061723
  - Chattha, Ilyas Ahmad (September 2009), Partition and Its Aftermath: Violence, Migration and the Role of Refugees in the Socio-Economic Development of Gujranwala and Sialkot Cities, 1947–1961 (PDF), University of Southampton, archived from the original (PDF) on 28 April 2016
- Cheema, Brig Amar (2015), The Crimson Chinar: The Kashmir Conflict: A Politico Military Perspective, Lancer Publishers, ISBN 978-81-7062-301-4
- Chowdhary, Rekha (2015), Jammu and Kashmir: Politics of Identity and Separatism, Routledge, ISBN 978-1-317-41405-6
- Das Gupta, Jyoti Bhusan (1968), Jammu and Kashmir, Springer, ISBN 978-94-011-9231-6
- Dasgupta, C. (2014) [first published 2002], War and Diplomacy in Kashmir, 1947-48, SAGE Publications, ISBN 978-81-321-1795-7
- Effendi, Col. M. Y. (2007), Punjab Cavalry: Evolution, Role, Organisation and Tactical Doctrine 11 Cavalry, Frontier Force, 1849-1971, Karachi: Oxford University Press, ISBN 978-0-19-547203-5
- Garner, George (2013). "Chechnya and Kashmir: The Jihadist Evolution of Nationalism to Jihad and Beyond". Terrorism and Political Violence. 25 (3): 419–434. doi:10.1080/09546553.2012.664202. ISSN 0954-6553.
- Guha, Ramachandra (28 August 2004), "Opening a Window in Kashmir", Economic and Political Weekly, 39 (35): 3905–3913, JSTOR 4415473
- Guha, Ramachandra (2011), India after Gandhi: The History of the World's Largest Democracy, Pan Macmillan, ISBN 978-0-330-54020-9
- Gupta, Sisir (1966), Kashmir: A Study in India-Pakistan Relations, Asia Publishing House
- Hajari, Nisid (2015), Midnight's Furies: The Deadly Legacy of India's Partition, Houghton Mifflin Harcourt, ISBN 978-0-547-66924-3
- Hiro, Dilip (2015), The Longest August: The Unflinching Rivalry Between India and Pakistan, Nation Books, ISBN 978-1-56858-503-1
- Hussain, Syed Taffazull (2016), Sheikh Abdullah – A Biography: The Crucial Period 1905–1939. 2016 Edition, Syed Taffazull Hussain, ISBN 978-1-60481-603-7
- Ibrahim Khan, Muhammad (1990), The Kashmir Saga, Verinag
- Jalal, Ayesha (2002), Self and Sovereignty: Individual and Community in South Asian Islam Since 1850, Routledge, ISBN 978-1-134-59937-0
- Jalal, Ayesha (2014), The Struggle for Pakistan: A Muslim Homeland and Global Politics, Harvard University Press, ISBN 978-0-674-74499-8
- Jamal, Arif (2009), Shadow War: The Untold Story of Jihad in Kashmir, Melville House, ISBN 978-1-933633-59-6
- Jha, Prem Shankar (2003), The Origins of a Dispute: Kashmir 1947, Oxford University Press, ISBN 978-0-19-566486-7
  - Jha, Prem Shankar (1996), Kashmir, 1947: Rival Versions of History, Oxford University Press, ISBN 978-0-19-563766-3
- Joshi, Manoj (2008), Kashmir, 1947–1965: A Story Retold, India Research Press, ISBN 978-81-87943-52-5
- Kapoor, Sindhu (2014), "Politics of Protests in Jammu and Kashmir from 1925 to 1951", University, University of Jammu/Shodhganga, hdl:10603/78307
- Korbel, Josef (1966) [1954], Danger in Kashmir, Princeton University Press, ISBN 9781400875238
- Kumar, Radha; Puri, Ellora (2009), "Jammu and Kashmir", in Radha Kumar (ed.), Negotiating Peace in Deeply Divided Societies: A Set of Simulations, SAGE Publications, ISBN 978-81-321-0218-2
- Lamb, Alastair (1997), Incomplete Partition: The Genesis of the Kashmir Dispute, 1947–1948, Roxford Books, ISBN 0-907129-08-0
- Mahajan, Mehr Chand (1963), Looking Back: The Autobiography of Mehr Chand Mahajan, Former Chief Justice of India, Asia Publishing House
- Nawaz, Shuja (May 2008), "The First Kashmir War Revisited", India Review, 7 (2): 115–154, doi:10.1080/14736480802055455, S2CID 155030407
- Palit, D. K. (1972), Jammu and Kashmir Arms: History of the J & K Rifles, Palit & Dutt
- Pampori, Mohammad Sultan (1992), Kashmir in chains, 1819–1992, Pampori Pub. House
- Parashar, Parmanand (2004), Kashmir and the Freedom Movement, Sarup & Sons, ISBN 978-81-7625-514-1
- Puri, Balraj (1993), Kashmir Towards Insurgency, Delhi: kashmirlibrary.org
- Puri, Luv (2013), Across the Line of Control: Inside Azad Kashmir, Columbia University Press, ISBN 978-0-231-80084-6
- Raghavan, Srinath (2010), War and Peace in Modern India, Palgrave Macmillan, ISBN 978-1-137-00737-7
- Rai, Mridu (2004), Hindu Rulers, Muslim Subjects: Islam, Rights, and the History of Kashmir, C. Hurst & Co, ISBN 978-1850656616
- Riedel, Bruce (2012), Deadly Embrace: Pakistan, America, and the Future of the Global Jihad, Brookings Institution Press, ISBN 978-0-8157-2283-0
- Saraf, Muhammad Yusuf (1977), Kashmiris Fight for Freedom, Volume 1, Ferozsons
- Schaffer, Howard B. (2009), The Limits of Influence: America's Role in Kashmir, Brookings Institution Press, ISBN 978-0-8157-0370-9
- Schofield, Victoria (2003) [First published in 2000], Kashmir in Conflict, London and New York: I. B. Taurus & Co, ISBN 978-1860648984
- Shankar, Mahesh (2016), "Nehru's legacy in Kashmir: Why a plebiscite never happened", India Review, 15 (1): 1–21, doi:10.1080/14736489.2016.1129926, S2CID 155701436
- Sherwani, Latif Ahmed (1986), The Partition of India and Mountbatten, Council for Pakistan Studies, GGKEY:0KUG6RJYNX6
- Singh, K. Brahma (1990), History of Jammu and Kashmir Rifles, 1820–1956: The State Force Background, Lancer International, ISBN 978-81-7062-091-4
  - Singh, K. Brahma (2010) [first published Lancer International 1990], History of Jammu and Kashmir Rifles, 1820–1956: The State Force Background (PDF), brahmasingh.co.nf, ISBN 978-81-7062-091-4
- Singh, Sm Jasbir (2013), Roar of the Tiger - Illustrated History of Operations in Kashmir by 4th Battalion The Kumaon Regt in 1965 War, Vij Books India Pvt Ltd, ISBN 978-93-82652-03-8
- Singh, V. K. (2005), Leadership in the Indian Army: Biographies of Twelve Soldiers, SAGE Publications, pp. 160–, ISBN 978-0-7619-3322-9
- Sirrs, Owen L. (2016), Pakistan's Inter-Services Intelligence Directorate: Covert Action and Internal Operations, Routledge, ISBN 978-1-317-19609-9
- Snedden, Christopher (2013) [first published as The Untold Story of the People of Azad Kashmir, 2012], Kashmir: The Unwritten History, HarperCollins India, ISBN 978-9350298985
- Suharwardy, Abdul Haq (1983), Tragedy in Kashmir, Wajidalis
- Swami, Praveen (2007), India, Pakistan and the Secret Jihad: The covert war in Kashmir, 1947–2004, Asian Security Studies, Routledge, ISBN 978-0-415-40459-4
- Talbot, Ian (1998), Pakistan: A Modern History, St. Martin's Press, ISBN 978-0-312-21606-1
- Zaidi, Z. H. (2001), Quaid-i-Azam Mohammad Ali Jinnah Papers: Pakistan : pangs of birth, 15 August-30 September 1947, Quaid-i-Azam Papers Project, National Archives of Pakistan, ISBN 978-969-8156-09-1
- Zaheer, Hasan (1998), The Times and Trial of the Rawalpindi Conspiracy, 1951: The First Coup Attempt in Pakistan, Oxford University Press, ISBN 978-0-19-577892-2
  - Zaheer, Hasan (2007) [first published by Oxford University Press Pakistan in 1998], The Times and Trial of the Rawalpindi Conspiracy, 1951: The First Coup Attempt in Pakistan, Sang-e-Meel Publishers, ISBN 978-969-35-1992-1
