= United Nations Security Council Resolution 80 =

UN Security Council resolution regarding the Kashmir conflict

UN Security Council Resolution 80
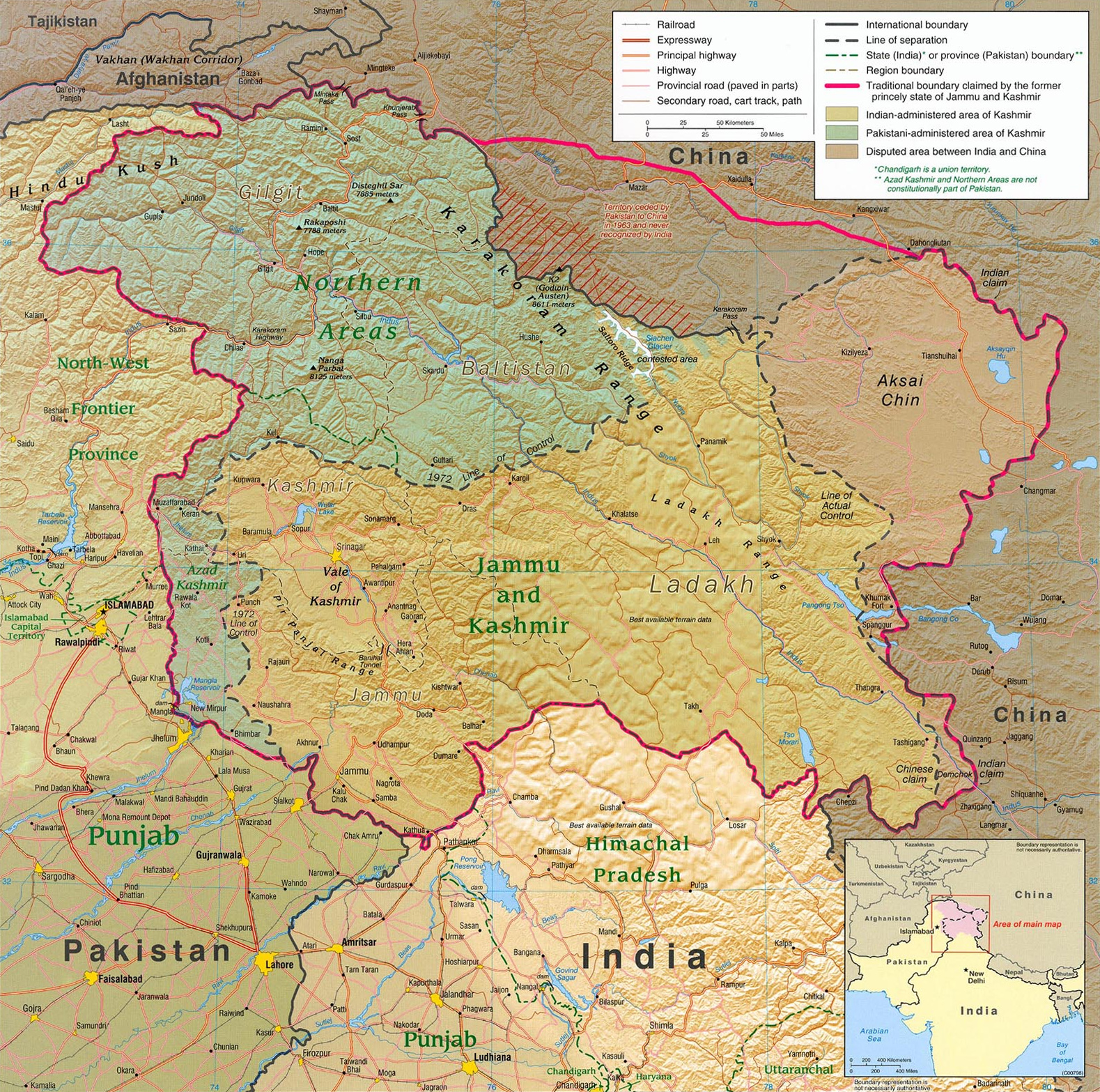
- The territory of the princely state of Jammu and Kashmir, administered by Pakistan (green) and India (yellow and red) in 1950
- Date: March 14 1950
- Meeting no.: 470
- Code: S/1469 (Document)
- Subject: The India–Pakistan Question
- Voting summary: 8 voted for; None voted against; 2 abstained; 1 absent
- Result: Adopted

Security Council composition
- Permanent members: China; France; Soviet Union; United Kingdom; United States
- Non-permanent members: Cuba; Ecuador; Egypt; India; Norway; Yugoslavia

United Nations Security Council Resolution 80, adopted on March 14, 1950, having received the reports of the Commission for India and Pakistan, as well as a report from General A. G. L. McNaughton, the Council commended India and Pakistan for their compliance with the ceasefire and for the demilitarization of Jammu and Kashmir and agreement on Fleet Admiral Chester W. Nimitz as the future Plebiscite Administrator.

The resolution called for:

1. Simultaneous and progressive demilitarisation by both India and Pakistan to the point where the remaining force would "not cause fear at any point of time to the people on either side of cease-fire line."
2. The northern areas to be administered by local authorities, subjected to UN supervision.
3. The Council to appoint a United Nations Representative to assist in the preparations and implementation of the demilitarization program, to advise the Governments of India and Pakistan as well as those of the Council, to exercise all of the power and responsibilities of the United Nations Commission for India and Pakistan, to arrange for the Plebiscite Administrator to assume all the functions assigned to him at the appropriate stage of demilitarization and to report to the Council as he saw necessary.

The resolution 80 marked a shift from the resolution 47 which called for Pakistan to withdraw first. Resolution 80 asked India and Pakistan to withdraw their troops simultaneously for the purpose of plebiscite. It also implicitly equated the Azad Kashmir Forces and the Jammu and Kashmir State Forces, which went against the assurances given by the earlier UN Commission. This attempt at the equality of Azad Kashmir and Jammu and Kashmir did not find India's agreement.

The Resolution went on to request the two governments to take all necessary precautions to ensure that the cease-fire continue, thanked the members of the United Nations Commission for India and Pakistan as well as General A. G. L. McNaughton and agreed that the United Nations Commission for India and Pakistan would be terminated one month after both parties have informed the United Nations Representative of their acceptance of the transfer of the powers and responsibilities of the United Nations Commission to him.

The resolution passed with eight votes in favour; India and Yugoslavia abstained, and the Soviet Union was absent when voting took place.

== See also ==
- Kashmir conflict
- List of United Nations Security Council Resolutions 1 to 100 (1946–1953)

== Bibliography ==
- Das Gupta, Jyoti Bhusan (2012) [first published 1968], Jammu and Kashmir, Springer, ISBN 978-94-011-9231-6
- Korbel, Josef (1966) [first published 1954], Danger in Kashmir (second ed.), Princeton University Press, ISBN 9781400875238
