= United Nations Security Council Resolution 38 =

United Nations Security Council resolution

UN Security Council Resolution 38
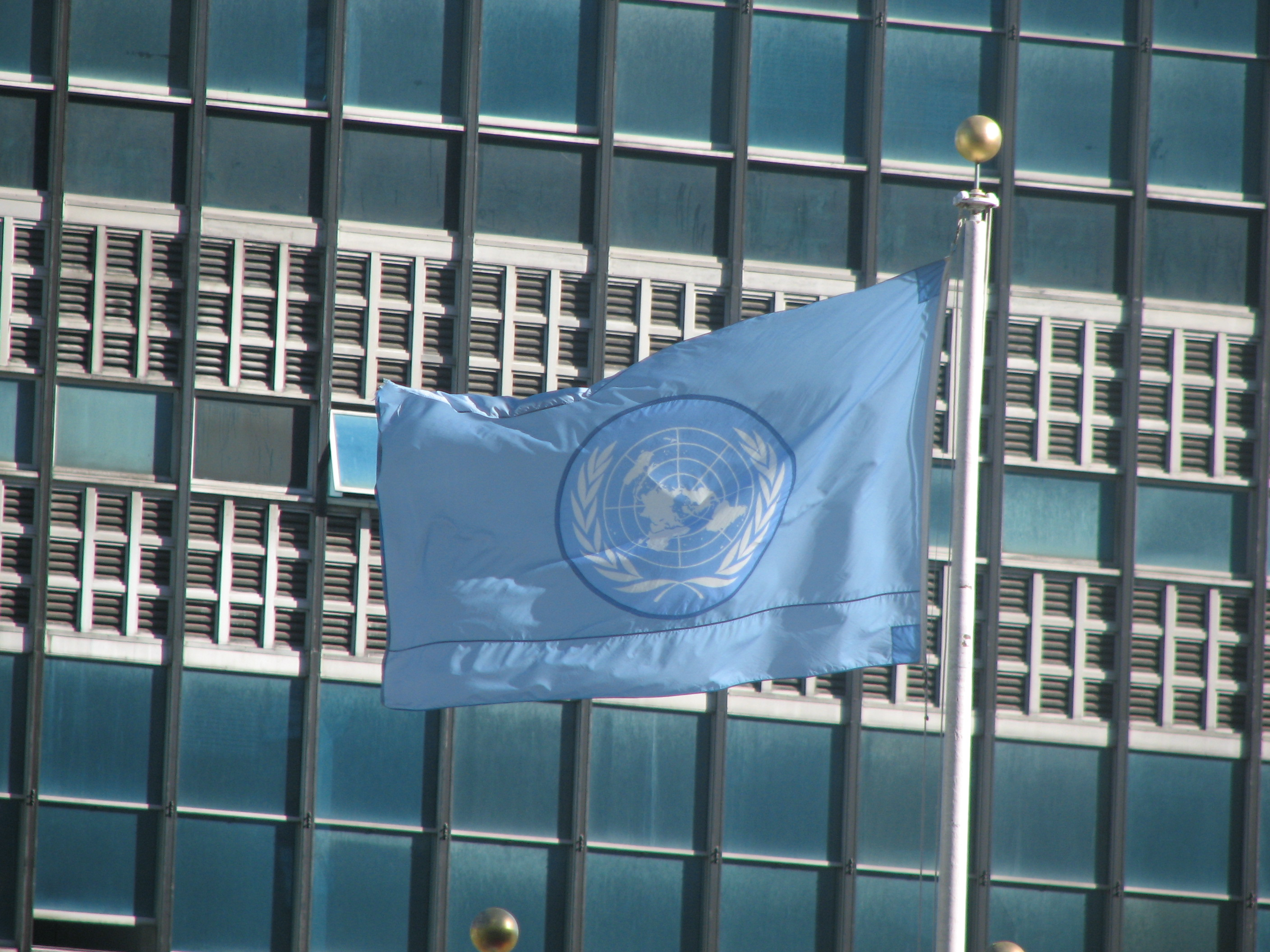
- UN flag
- Date: 17 January 1948
- Meeting no.: 229
- Code: S/RES/38 (Document)
- Subject: The India–Pakistan question
- Voting summary: 9 voted for; None voted against; 2 abstained
- Result: Adopted

Security Council composition
- Permanent members: China; France; Soviet Union; United Kingdom; United States
- Non-permanent members: Argentina; Belgium; Canada; Colombia; Syria; Ukrainian SSR

United Nations Security Council Resolution 38 was adopted on 17 January 1948. The Council instructed India and Pakistan to improve the situation in Kashmir. Both parties were requested to inform the Council of any changes in the situation.

Resolution 38 passed with nine votes to none. The Soviet Union and the Ukrainian SSR abstained.

== See also ==
- United Nations Security Council Resolution 39
- United Nations Security Council Resolution 47
- United Nations Security Council Resolution 51
- List of United Nations Security Council Resolutions 1 to 100 (1946–1953)
