= Karachi Agreement =

1949 UN-supervised agreement between India and Pakistan

Agreement Regarding the Establishment of a Cease-Fire Line in the State of Jammu and Kashmir
- Type: Delimitation of Cease-Fire Line
- Context: Post Indo-Pakistani War 1947
- Drafted: 13 August 1948
- Signed: 27 July 1949; 77 years ago
- Location: Karachi, Pakistan
- Mediators: United Nations Commission for India and Pakistan
- Negotiators: Military representatives of India and Pakistan
- Signatories: Lt. Gen. S. M. Shrinagesh on behalf of India; Maj. Gen. W. J. Cawthorn on behalf of Pakistan; Hernando Samper and M. Delvoie from UNCIP
- Parties: India; Pakistan; United Nations
- Depositaries: Government of India; Government of Pakistan
- Languages: English

The Karachi Agreement of 1949 was signed by the military representatives of India and Pakistan, supervised by the United Nations Commission for India and Pakistan, establishing a cease-fire line in Kashmir following the Indo-Pakistani War of 1947. It established a cease-fire line which has been monitored by United Nations observers from the United Nations since then.

== Background ==
The Security Council Resolution 39 of April 1948 established a UN Commission (United Nations Commission for India and Pakistan — UNCIP) to mediate between India and Pakistan to bring about a cessation of fighting in Kashmir and to make arrangements for a popular plebiscite. After negotiations with the two sides, the Commission passed a three-part resolution in August 1948 and subsequently added a 'supplement'. The three parts dealt with ceasefire, terms for truce, and procedures for negotiation regarding the plebiscite. Both the countries accepted the resolution and a ceasefire was achieved on 31 December 1948.

== Agreement ==
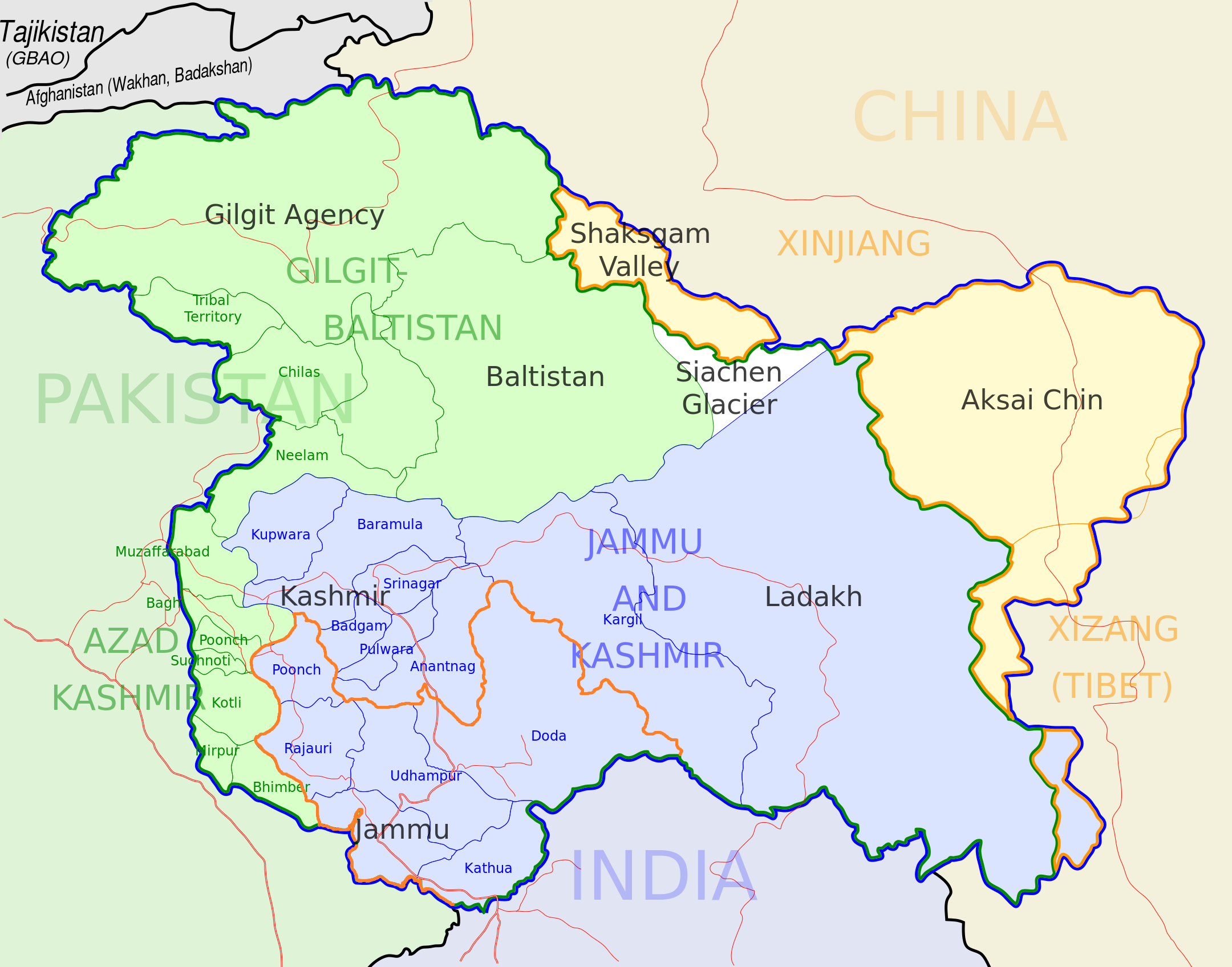
The princely state of Jammu and Kashmir with the current Line of Control defined in 1972 (similar to that of 1949)

The Karachi Agreement formally called the Agreement Between Military Representatives of India and Pakistan Regarding the Establishment of a Cease-Fire Line in the State of Jammu and Kashmir, was signed on 27 July 1949, supervised by the Truce Subcommittee of the UNCIP.

The signatories were:

1. Lt. Gen. S. M. Shrinagesh, on behalf of India
2. Maj. Gen. W. J. Cawthorn, on behalf of Pakistan
3. Hernando Samper and M. Delvoie, on behalf of the UNCIP.

The other members of the Indian delegation were Maj. Gen. K. S. Thimayya, Brig. Sam Manekshaw, Maj. S. K. Sinha (who acted as the aide-de-camp for Gen. Srinagesh), and the secretaries of the Defence Ministry and the Ministry of Kashmir Affairs. The Pakistani delegation included Maj. Gen. Nazir Ahmed and Brig. Sher Khan and civil servants M. Ayub and A. A. Khan. The military representatives of the two sides negotiated for a week starting 18 July to demarcate the positions under their control.

S. K. Sinha stated that the Prime Minister Jawaharlal Nehru briefed the Indian delegation before the Karachi meeting, wherein he informed them that the UN Resolution conceded the legality of Kashmir's accession to India and, so, any "no man's land" would belong to India. The Pakistani delegation would need to produce proof to the UN Commission of factual positions of their control for all the territory they claim. Sinha stated that, based on this principle, the agreement demarcated several hundred square miles of territory on the Indian side even though there were no Indian troops in that territory.

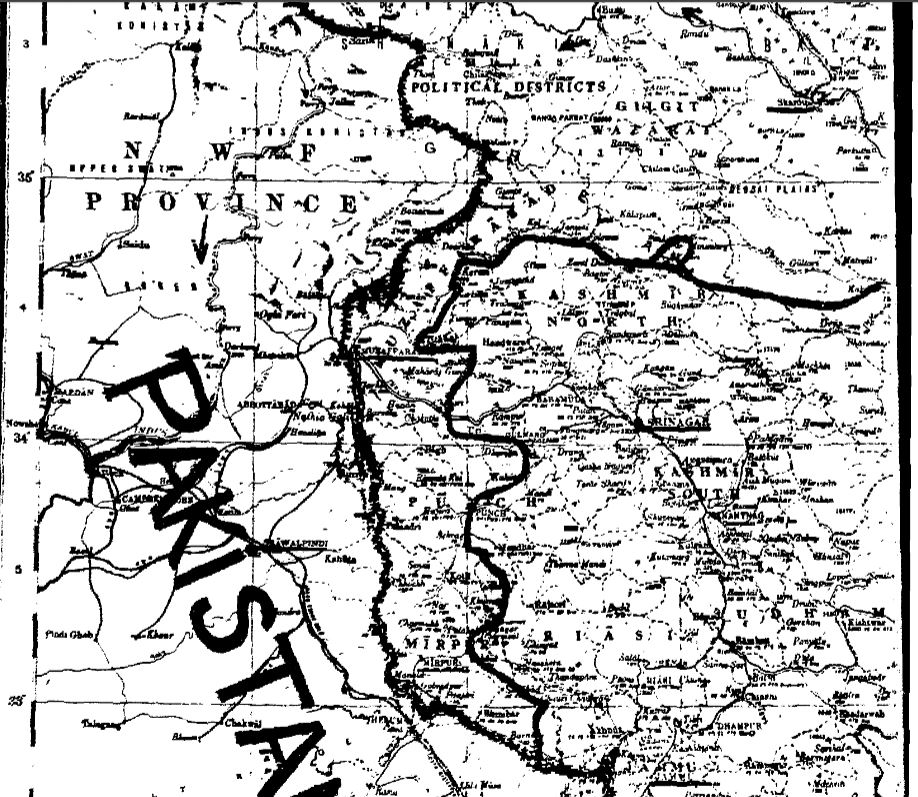
The ceasefire line of 1949

The 830 kilometre long ceasefire line established in the agreement started from a southernmost point just west of the Chenab river in Jammu. It ran in a rough arc northwards and then northeastwards to the map coordinate NJ9842, about 19 km north of the Shyok river.

From the map point NJ9842, it was said to run due north to the international boundary with China, at a distance of about 60–65 km. Since there were no troops in that area of inaccessible glacial terrain, no effort was made to extend the ceasefire line between NJ9842 and the China border. This area, of the Siachen Glacier, eventually became a bone of contention between India and Pakistan.

Another anomaly arose at the southern end of the ceasefire line in Jammu. From the terminus of the ceasefire line to the international boundary between Indian and Pakistani Punjab, there was a gap of over 200 km, which was covered by a recognised "provincial boundary" between Pakistani Punjab and the princely state of Jammu and Kashmir. India generally referred to this boundary as the "international border", whereas Pakistan referred to it as the "border" or the "working border".

== Map of the Agreement ==
U.N. document number S/1430/Add.2 (which is the second addendum to the 1949 Karachi Agreement) shows the Cease Fire Line (CFL) marked on the Map of the State of Jammu and Kashmir. Title of this addendum reads:

Map of the State of Jammu and Kashmir showing the Cease Fire Line as Agreed Upon in the Karachi Agreement, Ratified by the Governments of India and Pakistan on 29 and 30 July Respectively. (See Annex 26 to the third Interim Report of the United Nation Commission for India and Pakistan)

=== U.N. Map illustrating Cease Fire Line as per Karachi Agreement ===
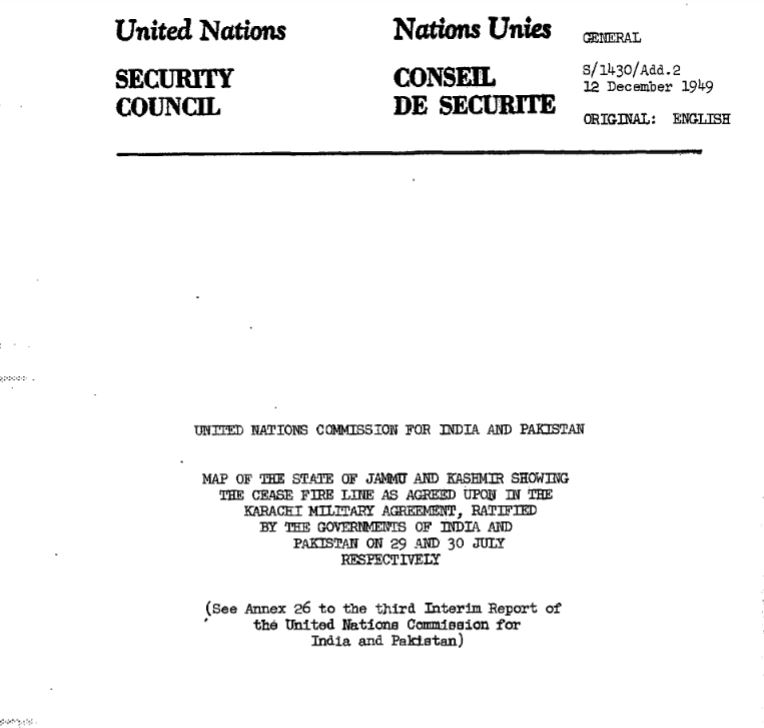
Page-1 of U.N. Map Number S/1430/Add.2 to Karachi Agreement 1949

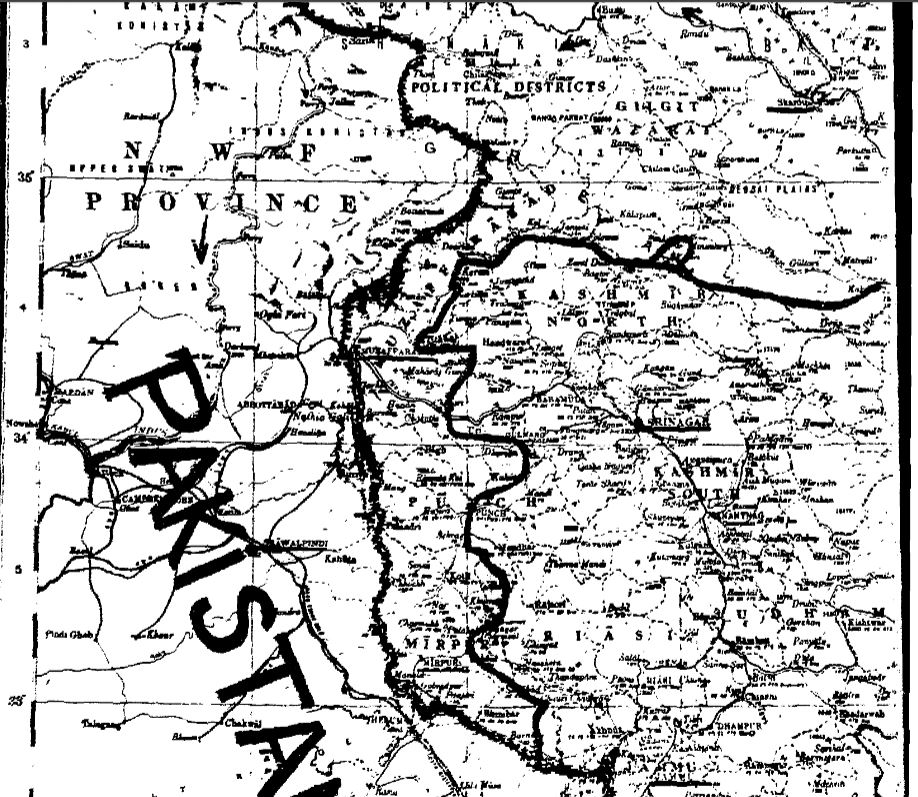
Page-2 of U.N. Map Number S/1430/Add.2 showing CFL

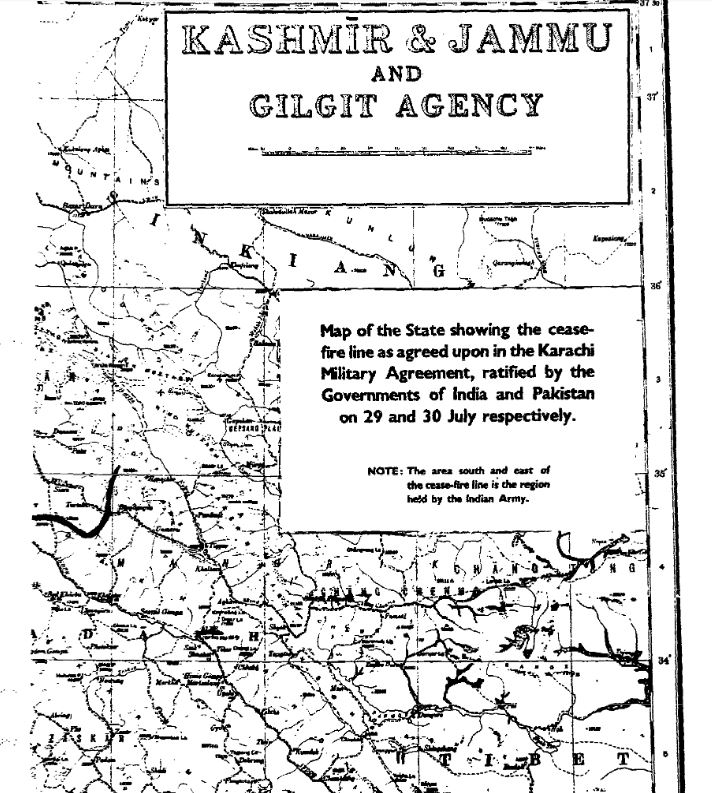
Page-3 U.N. Map Number S/1430/Add.2 showing CFL terminating at NJ9842

The Karachi Agreement between India and Pakistan established a cease-fire line to be supervised by the military observers. These observers, under the command of the Military Advisor, formed the nucleus of the United Nations Military Observer Group in India and Pakistan (UNMOGIP). On 30 March 1951, following the termination of the United Nations Commission for India and Pakistan (UNCIP), the Security Council, by Resolution 91 (1951) decided that UNMOGIP should continue to supervise the cease-fire line in Kashmir. UNMOGIP's functions were to observe and report, investigate complaints of cease-fire violations and submit its findings to each party and to the Secretary-General.

== See also ==
- NJ9842
- Simla Agreement
- United Nations Security Council Resolution 47
- Karachi Agreement (Azad Kashmir)

== Bibliography ==
- Bhattacharya, Brig. Samir (2013), NOTHING BUT!: Book Three: What Price Freedom, Partridge Publishing, ISBN 978-1-4828-1625-9
- John Cherian, Spotlight on Siachen, Frontline, 17 July 1999
- Hilaire, Max (2005), United Nations Law And the Security Council, Ashgate Publishing, Ltd, ISBN 9780754644897
- Wirsing, Robert (1998), War or Peace on the Line of Control? The India-Pakistan Dispute over Kashmir Turns Fifty, University of Durham, International Boundaries Research Unit, pp. 9–11, ISBN 1-897643-31-4
