= NZD (disambiguation) =

NZD is the ISO 4217 currency code for the New Zealand dollar, the New Zealand currency.

NZD or nzd may also refer to:

- NZD, the Indian Railways station code for Nuzvid railway station, Andhra Pradesh, India
- NZD, the Pakistan Railways station code for Nizamabad railway station, Pakistan
- nzd, the ISO 639-3 code for Nzadi language, Democratic Republic of the Congo
