= United Nations Security Council Resolution 39 =

United Nations Security Council resolution

UN Security Council Resolution 39
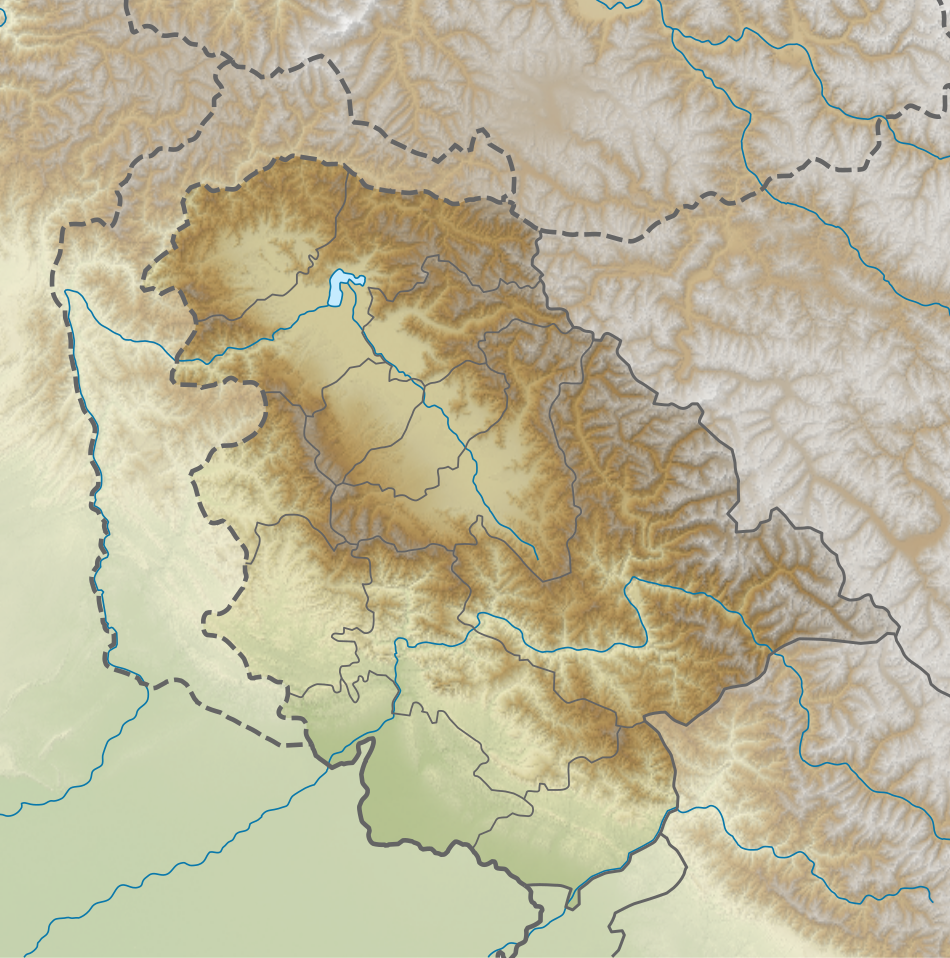
- Map of Jammu and Kashmir
- Date: January 20 1948
- Meeting no.: 230
- Code: S/654 (Document)
- Subject: The India–Pakistan question
- Voting summary: 9 voted for; None voted against; 2 abstained
- Result: Adopted

Security Council composition
- Permanent members: China; France; Soviet Union; United Kingdom; United States
- Non-permanent members: Argentina; Belgium; Canada; Colombia; Syria; Ukrainian SSR

United Nations Security Council Resolution 39 was adopted on 20 January 1948. The Council established a commission (made up of one member chosen by India, one chosen by Pakistan, and one chosen by the two existing members) to assist in the peaceful resolution of the situation in Kashmir.

Resolution 39 passed with nine votes to none. The Soviet Union and the Ukrainian SSR abstained.

== Functions of the commission ==
The commission established by Resolution 39 was dispatched to Kashmir to address the allegations made by India in a letter from 1 January and by Pakistan in a submission from 15 January.

Pakistan's allegations were wide-ranging, including that India was attempting to undo partition, committing a genocide against muslims in East Punjab, Delhi, and other areas, forcefully occupying Junagadh, had occupied Jammu and Kashmir through "fraud and violence", and had threatened Pakistan with direct military action.

== Negotiations and aftermath ==
Resolution 39 was moved by Belgium as the President of the United Nations Security Council and headed by Philip Noel-Baker, the British Minister for Commonwealth Relations. (Note: Ankit, Britain and Kashmir (2013, p. 278) quotes Noel-Baker stating "The fact that Van Langenhove is largely guided by us is not known... and we take every precaution to ensure that it is not known.")

The British delegation sought to persuade India to accept an impartial administration in Kashmir under the United Nations (UN). The administration was to be led by a neutral chairman, and Kashmir was to be under a joint military occupation led by a neutral commander-in-chief, both appointed by the UN. These efforts were not supported by the United States. No move was made to create the commission until after the passage of Resolution 47. Eleven weeks passed before the commission was formed and dispatched to the Indian subcontinent.

Josef Korbel, a diplomat representing Czechoslovakia, criticized the United Nations' delay in forming the United Nations Commission for India and Pakistan. He argued that the political and military situation in Kashmir had changed drastically between January and April 1948.

It was later discovered that Pakistan's failure to nominate a representative to the commission contributed to the delay.

== See also ==
- United Nations Security Council Resolution 38
- United Nations Security Council Resolution 51
- List of United Nations Security Council Resolutions 1 to 100 (1946–1953)

== Bibliography ==
- Ankit, Rakesh (2013), "Britain and Kashmir, 1948: 'The Arena of the UN'", Diplomacy & Statecraft, 24 (2): 273–290, doi:10.1080/09592296.2013.789771, S2CID 154021048
- Dasgupta, C. (2014) [first published 2002], War and Diplomacy in Kashmir, 1947-48, SAGE Publications, ISBN 978-81-321-1795-7
- Korbel, Josef (1966) [first published 1954], Danger in Kashmir (second ed.), Princeton University Press, ISBN 9781400875238
- Schaffer, Howard B. (2009), The Limits of Influence: America's Role in Kashmir, Brookings Institution Press, ISBN 978-0-8157-0370-9
