= Karachi Agreement (Azad Kashmir) =

1949 agreement between Pakistan and Azad Kashmir

- Context: First Kashmir War (Indo-Pakistani War of 1947–1948)
- Signed: 28 April 1949
- Original signatories: (Muhammad Ibrahim) President Azad Kashmir Govt.; (M.A. Gurmani) Minister without Portfolio, Government of Pakistan; (Ghulam Abbas) President All Jammu and Kashmir
- Parties: Pakistan; Azad Kashmir
- Citations: Karachi Agreement

Karachi Agreement is an agreement purportedly executed on 28 April 1949 between the Government of Pakistan and the then Government of Azad Kashmir governing the relations between Pakistan and Azad Kashmir. It set down the division of the powers between the two governments as well as the All Jammu and Kashmir Muslim Conference. Through the agreement, Azad Kashmir ceded to the Government of Pakistan complete control over Gilgit-Baltistan (then called the "Northern Areas"), and the control over subjects of defence, foreign affairs and communications in its area.

== Execution ==
The Karachi Agreement is reported to have been signed on 28 April 1949 by:

1. Mushtaq Ahmed Gurmani, Pakistan's `Minister without Portfolio', in charge of the Ministry of Kashmir Affairs
2. Sardar Mohammed Ibrahim Khan, the president of Azad Kashmir
3. Chaudhry Ghulam Abbas, Head of All Jammu and Kashmir Muslim Conference

The agreement was kept as a secret document up to the 1990s. It was not reported in the newspaper reports of 1949, the memoirs of Sardar Ibrahim or any other sources. It was revealed for the first time in the Verdict on Gilgit and Baltistan (Northern Area) by the High Court of Azad Kashmir in the 1990s, which states that the agreement "appears to have been executed on 28 April 1949." Later, it was published as the Appendix XVII of The Constitution of Azad Jammu & Kashmir by Justice Syed Manzoor Hussain Gilani in 2008.

== Agreement ==
According to Christopher Snedden, the agreement was very much in Pakistan's favour and deprived the Azad Kashmiris of significant powers and responsibilities.

Part I of the agreement covered the structure and operation of the `Civil Administration of Azad Kashmir Area', which laid down the regulations for the Azad Kashmir government. Part II dealt with financial arrangements by which Pakistan would advance the money. Part III was titled the `Division of functions between the Governments of Pakistan, the Azad Kashmir Government and the Muslim Conference'.

In the division of powers, the Pakistan government allocated to itself eight important matters including Defence, negotiations with the UNCIP, foreign policy, publicity in foreign countries, coordination of refugee relief and rehabilitation, coordination of all arrangements for a plebiscite, all activities within Pakistan concerning Kashmir and, finally, all affairs of the `Gilgit and Ladakh areas' (which were then under the control of the political agent at Gilgit). The last item meant that Azad Kashmir `lost' Gilgit and Baltistan from its control, essentially permanently. This put paid to Azad Kashmir's claim of being an alternative government for the former princely state of Jammu and Kashmir and turned it into a local authority limited to a rump territory of the state. Pakistan obtained total control over the defence of the Pakistan-controlled Kashmir, including the `Azad Army'. It also took complete charge of relations with the Indian government and the Indian-controlled part of Jammu and Kashmir. The Azad Kashmir government no longer had any international role.

The Azad Kashmir government was allocated only four functions, three of which gave it responsibility for policy and administration of Azad Kashmir and to develop its economic resources. The fourth function was to give `advice' to the Minister without Portfolio in charge of the Ministry of Kashmir Affairs in its negotiations with the UNCIP.

The Muslim Conference was allocated eight functions, six of which gave it the responsibility to organise political activities within Azad Kashmir, the "Indian occupied areas of the State" and "among Kashmir refugees in Pakistan". These included activities for a plebiscite. The seventh function was to give "general guidance" to the Azad Kashmir government. The last function, identical to that of the Azad Kashmir government, was to give "advice" to the Minister without Portfolio in charge of the Ministry of Kashmir Affairs.

== Analysis ==
Christopher Snedden says that the Azad Kashmir government and the Muslim Conference accepted the agreement because they wanted Azad Kashmir to join Pakistan, which they expected to happen soon with the promised plebiscite. In his view, this relationship was similar to Pakistan's relationship with its other provinces.

However, Navnita Behera says that, as a result of the agreement, the Joint Secretary to the Ministry of Kashmir Affairs acquired "the best claim to being the real head of the Azad Kashmir government."

Regarding the loss of Gilgit-Baltistan, Snedden accepts Sardar Ibrahim's argument that the physical links of Azad Kashmir with Gilgit-Baltistan were weak. It was anticipated that Pakistan could administer it more easily via Peshawar or Rawalpindi. However, in the succeeding years, Azad Kashmir has tried to reassert its control over Gilgit-Baltistan by various means. In 1972, the Azad Kashmir Legislative Assembly passed a resolution reclaiming Gilgit-Baltistan. The Azad Kashmir Interim Constitution formulated in 1974 lists Gilgit-Baltistan as being part of Azad Kashmir. In 1992, the Azad Kashmir High Court admitted a petition and subsequently ordered the Azad Kashmir government to take control of Gilgit-Baltistan. The order was however challenged in the Azad Kashmir Supreme Court, which overturned it even though it maintained that Gilgit-Baltistan was part of Jammu and Kashmir. The people of Gilgit-Baltistan are reportedly incensed with the Karachi Agreement because there was no representative of theirs in making the agreement even though it decided the fate of Gilgit-Baltistan.

== See also ==
- Karachi Agreement
- Government of Gilgit-Baltistan
- Incorporation of Azad Kashmir as nominally self-governing state of Pakistan
- Kashmir conflict
