= United Nations Security Council Resolution 51 =

UN Security Council Resolution 51
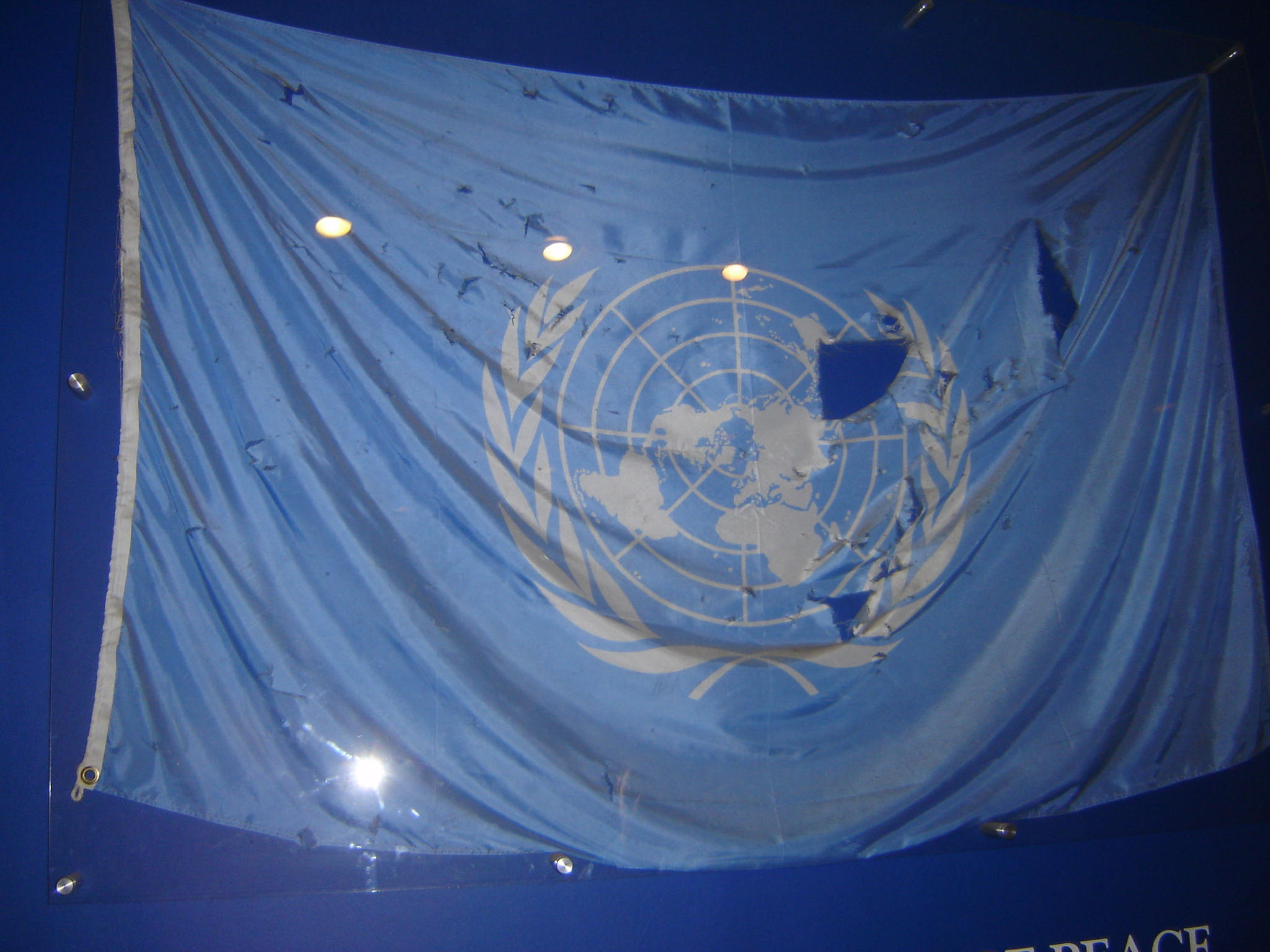
- UN flag
- Date: June 3 1948
- Meeting no.: 312
- Code: S/819 (Document)
- Subject: The India–Pakistan Question
- Voting summary: 8 voted for; None voted against; 3 abstained
- Result: Adopted

Security Council composition
- Permanent members: China; France; Soviet Union; United Kingdom; United States
- Non-permanent members: Argentina; Belgium; Canada; Colombia; Syria; Ukrainian SSR

United Nations Security Council Resolution 51, adopted on June 3, 1948, reaffirmed previous Council resolutions on the India–Pakistan conflict, directed the Commission established in United Nations Security Council Resolution 39 to move to the areas of dispute and accomplish the duties assigned to it in United Nations Security Council Resolution 47 as soon as possible. The resolution also instructed the Commission to address a letter that was sent to the Council by the Foreign Minister of Pakistan.

The resolution was adopted by eight votes; the Republic of China, Ukrainian SSR and Soviet Union abstained.

== See also ==
- List of United Nations Security Council Resolutions 1 to 100 (1946–1953)
