= Chapter VI of the United Nations Charter =

Rules on peaceful dispute resolution

Chapter VI of the United Nations Charter deals with peaceful settlement of disputes. It requires countries with disputes that could lead to war to first of all try to seek solutions through peaceful methods such as "negotiation, enquiry, mediation, conciliation, arbitration, judicial settlement, resort to regional agencies or arrangements, or other peaceful means of their own choice." If these methods of alternative dispute resolution fail, then they must refer it to the UN Security Council. Under Article 35, any country is allowed to bring a dispute to the attention of the UN Security Council or the General Assembly. This chapter authorizes the Security Council to issue recommendations but does not give it power to make binding resolutions; those provisions are contained in Chapter VII. Chapter VI is analogous to Articles 13-15 of the Covenant of the League of Nations which provide for arbitration and for submission of matters to the Council that are not submitted to arbitration. United Nations Security Council Resolution 47 and United Nations Security Council Resolution 242 are two examples of Chapter VI resolutions which remain unimplemented. United Nations Security Council Resolution 217 is an example of a Chapter VI resolution which was implemented.

== Nature of resolutions under Chapter VI ==
There is a general agreement among legal scholars outside the organization that resolutions made under Chapter VI (Pacific Settlement of Disputes) are not legally enforceable, although this does not preclude them being described as legally binding. One argument is that since they have no enforcement mechanism, except self-help, they may not be legally enforceable. Some States give constitutional or special legal status to the UN Charter and Security Council resolutions. In such cases non-recognition regimes or other sanctions can be implemented under the provisions of the laws of the individual member states.

The Repertory of Practice of United Nations Organs was established because "Records of the cumulating practice of international organizations may be regarded as evidence of customary international law with reference to States' relations to the organizations." The repertory cites the remarks made by the representative of Israel, Mr Eban, regarding a Chapter VI resolution. He maintained that the Security Council's resolution of 1 September 1951 possessed, within the meaning of Article 25, a compelling force beyond that pertaining to any resolution of any other organ of the United Nations, in his view the importance of the resolution had to be envisaged in the light of Article 25, under which the decisions of the council on matters affecting international peace and security assumed an obligatory character for all Member States. The Egyptian representative disagreed.

Secretary General Boutros Boutros-Ghali related that during a press conference his remarks about a "non-binding" resolution started a dispute. His assistant released a hasty clarification, which only made the situation worse. It said that the Secretary had only meant to say that Chapter VI contains no means of ensuring compliance and that resolutions adopted under its terms are not enforceable. When the Secretary finally submitted the question to the UN Legal Advisor, the response was a long memo the bottom line of which read, in capital letters: "NO SECURITY COUNCIL RESOLUTION CAN BE DESCRIBED AS UNENFORCEABLE." The Secretary said, "I got the message."

Prof. Jared Schott explains that "Though certainly possessing judicial language, without the legally binding force of Chapter VII, such declarations were at worst political and at best advisory".

In 1971, a majority of the International Court of Justice (ICJ) members in the Namibia advisory opinion held that the resolution contained legal declarations that were made while the council was acting on behalf of the members in accordance with Article 24. The Court also said that an interpretation of the charter that limits the domain of binding decision only to those taken under Chapter VII would render Article 25 "superfluous, since this [binding] effect is secured by Articles 48 and 49 of the Charter", and that the "language of a resolution of the Security Council should be carefully analyzed before a conclusion can be made as to its binding effect". The ICJ judgment has been criticized by Erika De Wet and others. De Wet argues that Chapter VI resolutions cannot be binding. Her reasoning, in part states:

Allowing the Security Council to adopt binding measures under Chapter VI would undermine the structural division of competencies foreseen by Chapters VI and VII, respectively. The whole aim of separating these chapters is to distinguish between voluntary and binding measures. Whereas the pacific settlement of disputes provided by the former is underpinned by the consent of the parties, binding measures in terms of Chapter VII are characterized by the absence of such consent. A further indication of the non-binding nature of measures taken in terms of Chapter VI is the obligation on members of the Security Council who are parties to a dispute, to refrain from voting when resolutions under Chapter VI are adopted. No similar obligation exists with respect to binding resolutions adopted under Chapter VII... If one applies this reasoning to the Namibia opinion, the decisive point is that none of the Articles under Chapter VI facilitate the adoption of the type of binding measures that were adopted by the Security Council in Resolution 276(1970)... Resolution 260(1970) was indeed adopted in terms of Chapter VII, even though the ICJ went to some length to give the opposite impression.

Others disagree with this interpretation. Professor Stephen Zunes asserts that "[t]his does not mean that resolutions under Chapter VI are merely advisory, however. These are still directives by the Security Council and differ only in that they do not have the same stringent enforcement options, such as the use of military force". Former President of the International Court of Justice Rosalyn Higgins argues that the location of Article 25, outside of Chapter VI and VII and with no reference to either, suggests its application is not limited to Chapter VII decisions. She asserts that the Travaux préparatoires to the UN Charter "provide some evidence that Article 25 was not intended to be limited to Chapter VII, or inapplicable to Chapter VI." She argues that early state practice into what resolutions UN members considered binding has been somewhat ambiguous, but seems to "rely not upon whether they are to be regarded as "Chapter VI or "Chapter VII" resolutions [...] but upon whether the parties intended them to be "decisions" or "recommendations" ... One is left with the view that in certain limited, and perhaps rare, cases a binding decision may be taken under Chapter VI". She supports the view of the ICJ that "clearly regarded Chapters VI, VII, VIII and XII as lex specialis while Article 24 contained the lex generalis ... [and] that resolutions validly adopted under Article 24 were binding on the membership as a whole".
