= Nizamabad (Pakistan) railway station =

Railway station in Pakistan

Nizamabad railway station

General information
- Coordinates: 32°25′47″N 74°07′03″E
- Owner: Ministry of Railways

Other information
- Station code: NZD

History
- Former names: Great Indian Peninsula Railway
Location
- Location within Pakistan

- For railway station in India see Nizamabad railway station.

Nizamabad railway station (Urdu: نظام آباد ریلوے اسٹیشن) is located in Pakistan.

== See also ==
- List of railway stations in Pakistan
- Pakistan Railways
