= Josef Korbel =

Czech-American diplomat (1909–1977)

Czechoslovakia Ambassador to Yugoslavia
- In office July 1945 – January 1948
- President: Edvard Beneš
- Preceded by: Jaroslav Lípa
- Succeeded by: Jiří Taufer

Personal details
- Born: September 20, 1909 Kyšperk, Austria-Hungary
- Died: July 18, 1977 (aged 67) Denver, Colorado, U.S.
- Spouse: Anna Spiegelová (m. 1935)
- Children: 3, including Madeleine Albright
- Relatives: Alice P. Albright (granddaughter)
- Education: Charles University in Prague; University of Paris

Academic work
- Institutions: University of Chicago

Josef Korbel (/ˌkɒrˈbɛl/; September 20, 1909 – July 18, 1977) was a Czech-born American diplomat and political scientist. During his public career, he served as Czechoslovakia's ambassador to Yugoslavia and was the country's representative to the United Nations Commission for India and Pakistan, serving as its chair. After settling down in the United States, Korbel became a professor of international politics at the University of Denver, where he founded the Graduate School of International Studies, which was later named after him, and served as its first dean.

His daughter, Madeleine Albright, served as Secretary of State under President Bill Clinton, and he was the mentor of President George W. Bush's Secretary of State, Condoleezza Rice. His granddaughter, Alice P. Albright, served as CEO of the Millennium Challenge Corporation under President Joe Biden.

== Background and career ==
Josef was born under the family name Körbel on September 20, 1909 to Czech Jewish parents, Arnost and Olga Körbel, both of whom were killed in the Holocaust. He married Anna Spiegelová on April 20, 1935. They had met in secondary school around 1928. Anna was born in 1910 to Alfred Spiegel and Růžena Spiegelová, assimilated Jews. Her parents gave her the common Czech nickname of Andula. Korbel called her Mandula, a portmanteau of "Má Andula" (Czech for "My Andula"), while Anna called him Jozka.

At the time of their daughter Madeleine's birth, Josef was serving as press-attaché at the Czechoslovak Embassy in Belgrade.

Though he served as a diplomat in the government of Czechoslovakia, Korbel's politics and Judaism forced him to flee with his wife and baby Madeleine after the Nazi invasion in 1939 and move to London. Korbel served as an advisor to Edvard Beneš, in the Czech government in exile. He gave speeches for the BBC's daily broadcasts to Czechoslovakia and Yugoslavia. During their time in England the Korbels converted to Catholicism and dropped the umlaut from the family name, resulting in the second syllable of "Korbel" being stressed.

Korbel returned to Czechoslovakia after the war, receiving a luxurious Prague apartment expropriated from Karl Nebrich, an ethnic-Bohemian German industrialist expelled under the Beneš decrees. Korbel was appointed as the Czechoslovak ambassador to Yugoslavia, where he remained until the Communist coup in Czechoslovakia in February 1948. Around this time, he was named a delegate to the United Nations Commission for India and Pakistan to mediate on the Kashmir dispute. He served as its chair, and subsequently wrote several articles and a book on the Kashmir problem.

Following the Communist Party's rise to power in 1948, in 1949 Korbel applied for political asylum in the United States stating that he would be arrested in Czechoslovakia for his "faithful adherence to the ideals of democracy." He received asylum and also a grant from the Rockefeller Foundation to teach international politics at the University of Denver. In 1964, with the benefaction of Ben Cherrington, Korbel established the Graduate School of International Studies and became its founding Dean. One of his students was Condoleezza Rice, the first woman appointed National Security Advisor (2001) and the first African-American woman appointed Secretary of State (2005). Korbel's daughter Madeleine became the first female Secretary of State in 1997. Both of them have testified to his substantial influence on their careers in foreign policy and international relations.

Korbel died in 1977.

After his death, the University of Denver established the Josef Korbel Humanitarian Award in 2000. Since then, 28 people have received it.

The Graduate School of International Studies at the University of Denver was named the Josef Korbel School of International Studies on May 28, 2008.

== Academic work ==
- Tito's Communism (The Univ. of Denver Press, 1951). ISBN 978-5-88379-552-6. online
- Danger in Kashmir (Princeton University Press, 1954). ISBN 1400875234. online
- The Communist Subversion of Czechoslovakia, 1938–1948: The Failure of Co-existence (Oxford University Press, 1959), ISBN 978-1-4008-7963-2. online
- Poland Between East and West: Soviet and German Diplomacy toward Poland, 1919–1933 (Princeton University Press, 1963). ISBN 978-0691624631 online
- Detente in Europe: Real or Imaginary? (Princeton University Press, 1972). ISBN 978-0691644295.
- Conflict, Compromise, and Conciliation: West German–Polish Normalization 1966–1976 (with Louis Ortmayer, University of Denver, 1975).
- The Politics of Soviet Policy Formation: Khrushchev's Innovative Policies in Education and Agriculture (University of Denver, 1976).
- Twentieth-century Czechoslovakia : the meanings of its history online

=== Danger in Kashmir ===
Norman Palmer notes in a review of Korbel's book Danger in Kashmir that Korbel covers the same ground as Michael Brecher. Yashina Tarr sees that Korbel has succeeded in providing an objective assessment of the United Nations' work and recommends it to readers. Birdwood labels the content on the United Nations Commission involvement "authoritative" due to Korbel's own membership in the Commission. He also observes that the huge number of footnotes and quotations testify to Korbel's vast research put into this "valuable contribution" on the Kashmir dispute. Werner Levi observes that Korbel tends to abstain from giving his own judgements and evaluations. Levi states that Korbel's book is a "comprehensive and balanced statement" of a contested topic.

== Artwork ownership controversy ==
Philipp Harmer, an Austrian citizen, filed a lawsuit claiming that Josef Korbel's family is in inappropriate possession of artwork belonging to his great-grandfather, the German entrepreneur Karl Nebrich. Like most other ethnic Germans living in Czechoslovakia, Nebrich and his family were expelled from the country under the postwar "Beneš decrees", and left behind artwork and furniture in an apartment subsequently given to Korbel's family, before they also were forced to flee the country.
