= United Nations Security Council Resolution 47 =

1948 resolution on resolving the Kashmir conflict

UN Security Council 47
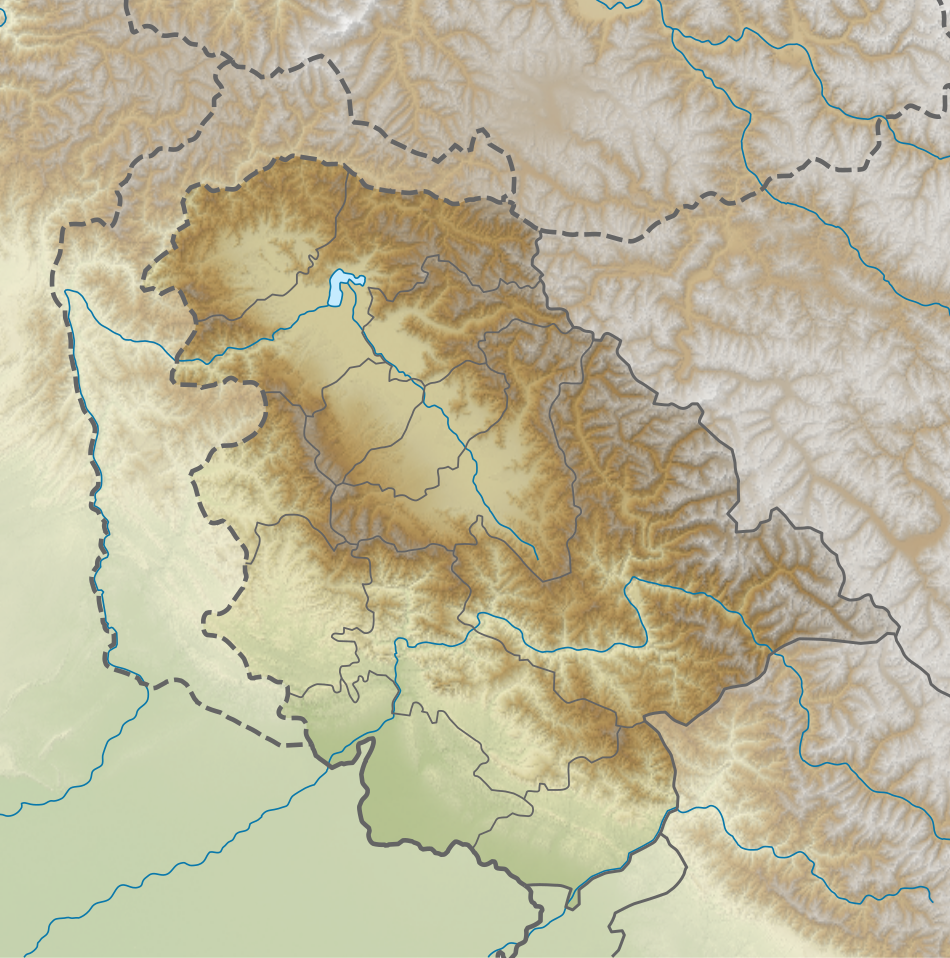
- Map of Jammu and Kashmir
- Date: 21 April 1948
- Meeting no.: 286
- Code: S/726 (Document)
- Subject: The India–Pakistan Question
- Result: Adopted

United Nations Security Council Resolution 47, adopted on 21 April 1948, concerns the resolution of the Kashmir conflict. After hearing arguments from both India and Pakistan, the Council increased the size of the UN Commission created by the former Resolution 39 to five members, instructed the Commission to go to the subcontinent and help the governments of India and Pakistan restore peace and order to the region and prepare for a plebiscite to decide the fate of Kashmir.

Secondly, the Resolution recommended a three-step process for the resolution of the dispute. In the first step, Pakistan was asked to withdraw all its nationals that entered Kashmir for the sake of fighting. In the second step, India was asked to progressively reduce its forces to the minimum level required for law and order. In the third step, India was asked to appoint a plebiscite administrator nominated by the United Nations who would conduct a free and impartial plebiscite.

The resolution was adopted paragraph by paragraph; no vote on the resolution as a whole was taken.

Both India and Pakistan raised objections to the Resolution. However, they welcomed mediation by the UN Commission. Through its mediation, the Commission amplified and amended the Security Council Resolution, adopting two resolutions of its own, which were accepted by both India and Pakistan. Subsequently, a cease-fire was achieved by the Commission at the beginning of 1949. However, a truce was not achieved due to disagreements over the process of demilitarisation. After considerable efforts, the Commission declared its failure in December 1949.

== Background ==
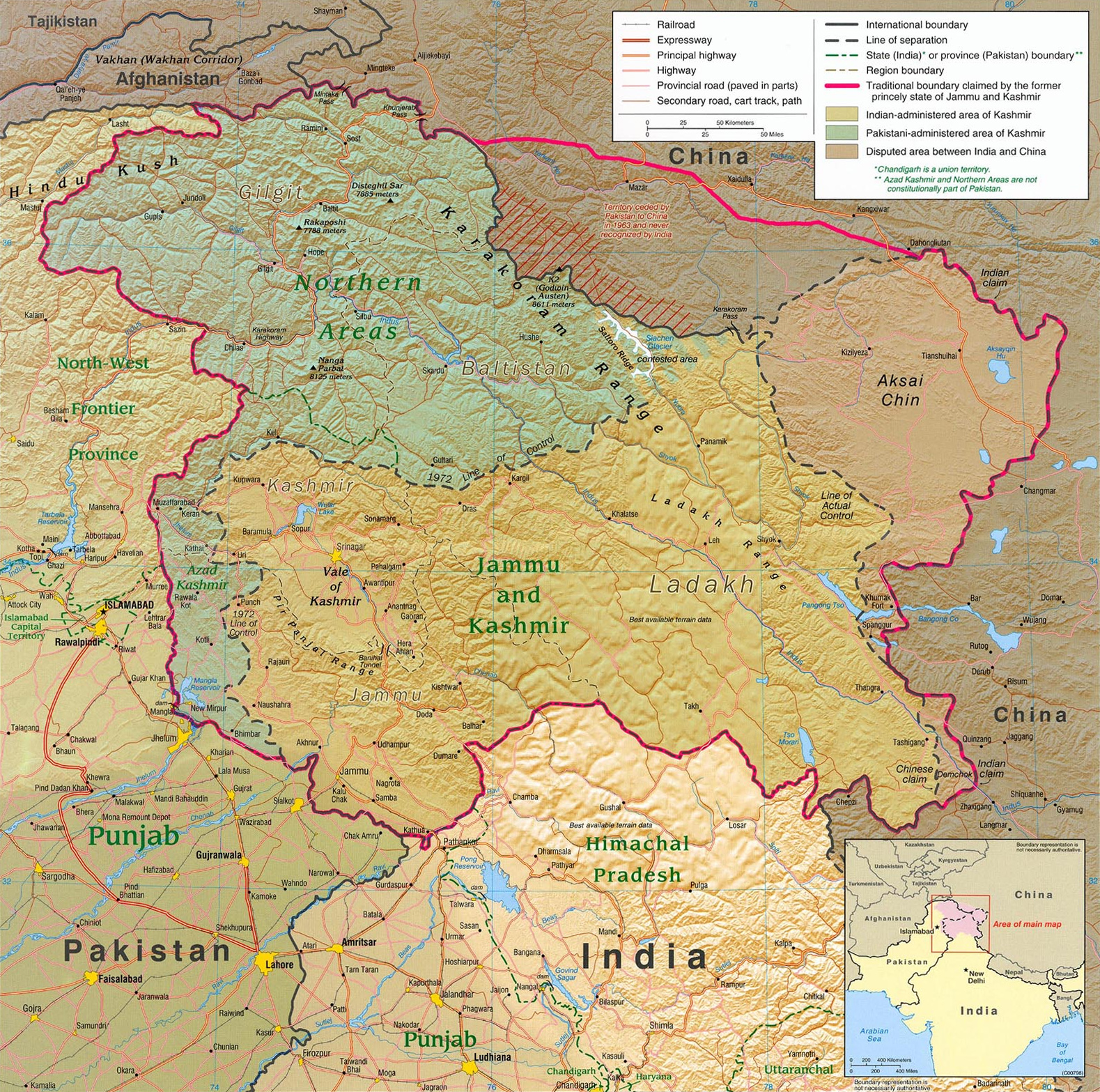
Map of the former princely state of Jammu and Kashmir

Prior to 1947, Jammu and Kashmir (Kashmir) was a princely state under British Paramountcy, ruled by a Hindu maharaja. With the impending independence and partition of British Raj into the dominions of Pakistan and India, the British announced that the British Paramountcy would lapse and the rulers of princely states were given the option of joining one of the two new countries (termed "accession") or staying independent. The Maharaja of Jammu and Kashmir chose to stay independent, however, most of the population was Muslim. (Note: According to the 1941 census, the state's population was 77 percent Muslim, 20 percent Hindu and 3 percent others (Sikhs and Buddhists). The Jammu province in the south was Hindu majority, related to the East Punjab in India, Ladakh in the east was Buddhist majority, the Kashmir Valley in the centre was predominantly Muslim and Kashmiri-speaking, the western districts were Sunni Muslim, related to the West Punjab in Pakistan, and the northern areas were predominantly Muslim of Shia and Ismaili sects.)

Following an uprising in the western districts of the state and an armed invasion by Pashtun tribes from Pakistan, the Maharaja acceded to India on 26 October 1947. India immediately air lifted troops into Kashmir the next day. Considerable evidence cited by scholars since then has pointed to Pakistan's complicity in instigating and supporting the invasion. A limited war ensued between the Indian troops and the Pakistani raiders within the confines of the princely state.

On 1 January 1948, India took the matter to the United Nations Security Council under Article 35 of the UN Charter, which allows the member nations to bring to the attention of the UN matters endangering international peace. It claimed that Pakistani nationals and tribesmen had attacked Jammu and Kashmir, which was Indian territory. It requested the Security Council to prevent Pakistan from continuing its actions. India also stated that, despite holding the state's legal accession, it was prepared to conduct a plebiscite to confirm the people's wishes and abide by its results. In response, Pakistan denied involvement in the conflict and made counter-accusations claiming that India had acquired the state's accession by "fraud and violence" and that it was conducting a "genocide" against Muslims.

On 20 January 1948, the Security Council passed Resolution 39 establishing a three-member Commission to investigate the complaints. However such a Commission did not come into fruition until May 1948. Meanwhile, the Security Council continued its deliberations and the war too continued.

== Resolution 47 ==
On 18 March, the Republic of China tabled a new draft resolution in three parts. The first part dealt with the restoration of peace, asking Pakistan to withdraw its nationals. The second part dealt with the conduct of plebiscite for the people of Kashmir to choose between India and Pakistan. India was asked to create a "Plebiscite Administration" whose directors would be nominated by the UN Secretary-General but would function as the officials of the state. The third part dealt with creating an interim administration for the state which would represent all major political groups in the state.

During the subsequent discussion, the draft was modified considerably, with several concessions made to Pakistan at the instigation of the British delegation. India expressed discomfort at the modifications.

=== The resolution ===
The final resolution adopted had two parts. The first part increased the Commission's strength to five members and asked it to proceed to the Indian subcontinent at once to mediate between India and Pakistan. The second part dealt with the Security council's recommendations for restoring peace and conducting a plebiscite. This involved three steps.

- In the first step, Pakistan was asked to use its "best endeavours" to secure the withdrawal of all tribesmen and Pakistani nationals, putting an end to the fighting in the state.
- In the second step, India was asked to "progressively reduce" its forces to the minimum level required for keeping law and order. It laid down principles that India should follow in administering law and order in consultation with the Commission, using local personnel as far as possible.
- In the third step, India was asked to ensure that all the major political parties were invited to participate in the state government at the ministerial level, essentially forming a coalition cabinet. India should then appoint a Plebiscite Administrator nominated by the United Nations, who would have a range of powers including powers to deal with the two countries and ensure a free and impartial plebiscite. Measures were to be taken to ensure the return of refugees, the release of all political prisoners, and for political freedom.

The resolution was approved by nine votes against none. The Soviet Union and Ukrainian SSR abstained.

=== Commentary ===
The resolution was passed under the Chapter VI of the United Nations Charter (which is devoted to "peaceful settlement of disputes"). It did not consist of directives to the parties, but rather "recommendations". Former UN diplomat Josef Korbel states that this bound the parties only "morally" but not "juridicially". The final resolution of the conflict rested with the governments of India and Pakistan and depended on their goodwill.

The Security Council refrained from taking sides in the dispute. It did not condemn Pakistan as the aggressor, as India had requested. Neither did it touch upon the legalities of the accession of Jammu and Kashmir. Korbel states that the Security Council could have requested the International Court of Justice to give an advisory opinion on the legal issues. Had that been done, the Security Council would have been in a stronger position to declare one of the parties to be in the wrong, and the handling of the dispute would have been easier.

In the event, the approach of the Security Council was "timid" in Korbel's view. Its evaluation of the Kashmir dispute was not realistic as was discovered soon with prolonged debates, endless wrangling, and adjournment of the deliberations. With the passing of time, the tensions and political cleavages in Kashmir grew and the plebiscite solution became increasingly difficult.

The American ambassador to the UN Warren R. Austin also shared the view. He thought the resolution, as well as others that followed, were unrealistic and ineffective. They depended on the goodwill of India and Pakistan cooperating with the Security Council and failed to give it the authority to impose sanctions. The US embassies in India and Pakistan were equally frustrated.

It is apparent that the Security Council viewed the problem as primarily a political dispute rather than looking at its legal underpinnings, in particular whether Kashmir's accession to India was valid. It implicitly assumed that accession was valid but incomplete, contingent upon the ratification by the people of the state. Thus it asked for the Pakistani nationals to withdraw in the first instance but held that plebiscite was the ultimate solution. Legal specialist Sumathi Subbiah contends that the way of dealing with the situation as a political dispute rather than legal obligations proved too weak to compel India and Pakistan to reach a final resolution.

=== Reception ===
Both India and Pakistan raised objections to the Resolution 47. (Note: The reaction finds various descriptions in the sources: Raghavan (2010, p. 132): "Both India and Pakistan rejected the resolution."; Korbel (1949, p. 279): "Both India and Pakistan raised voices against the April 1948 resolution."; Korbel (1966, pp. 112–113): "The Government of India sent a letter of protest to the United Nations and refused cooperation in any implementation of the resolution...One month later, however, the Indian representative was somehow more conciliatory... The Pakistani delegate was not wholly satisfied with the proposal but his criticism did not imply outright rejection.")

India objected first of all that the resolution placed India and Pakistan on an equal footing, ignoring the complaint of Pakistani aggression and Kashmir's legal accession to India. Secondly, it objected to the absence of allowance for it to retain troops in the state for its defence. It also felt the requirement of a coalition government would put Sheikh Abdullah, then Prime Minister of Kashmir, in an impossible position. It said that the powers conferred on the Plebiscite Administrator were far too wide and undermined the state's sovereignty. It felt that provision for the return of all refugees was unrealistic. Finally, India wanted Pakistan to be excluded from the conduct of the plebiscite.

Pakistan objected to the retention of the Indian forces in Kashmir, even at the minimum level allowed by the resolution. It wanted an equal representation in the government of the state for the Muslim Conference, the dominant party of the Pakistani-held Kashmir. The Pakistani government circles felt that the Security Council deliberations had been favourable to Pakistan but the final proposals were modified by the United States and Britain to "mollify" India. Britain came in for particular criticism.

Both the sides however welcomed the UN Commission and agreed to work with it.

== UN Commission ==
The five member United Nations Commission for India and Pakistan (UNCIP) consisted of the representatives from Czechoslovakia (Josef Korbel), Argentina (Ricardo Siri), Belgium (Egbert Graeffe), Colombia (Alfredo Lozano) and the United States (Jerome Klahr Huddle). It secretariat was headed by Erik Colban, the Norwegian ambassador to the UK, with the British Quaker Richard Symonds acting as Colban's secretary.

Sources state that the political atmosphere in both India and Pakistan was hostile to the Commission upon its arrival in the subcontinent in July 1948.

=== Ceasefire (1948) ===
Upon arriving in Karachi, the Commission was informed by Pakistan that three brigades of its regular troops had been fighting in Kashmir since May, which was described as a "bombshell" by Josef Korbel. In New Delhi, India asserted that it attached the highest importance to a declaration of Pakistan's guilt. The fighting in Kashmir went on unabated and the Commission recognized that the Sheikh Abdullah government in Jammu and Kashmir and the Azad Kashmir government in Muzaffarabad were engaged in an irreconcilable struggle.

On 13 August 1948, after discussions with both the governments, the Commission unanimously adopted a three-part resolution, amending and amplifying the UN Resolution 47.

- Part I dealt with ceasefire, calling for a complete cessation of hostilities.
- Part II dealt with a truce agreement. It asked for a complete withdrawal of Pakistan's fighting forces, including the army, tribes and other Pakistani nationals, and stated that the evacuated territory would be administered by local authorities under the surveillance of the Commission. Following the Pakistani withdrawal, India was expected to withdraw the "bulk of its forces" reducing them to the minimum level required for maintaining law and order.
- Part III stated that, after the acceptance of the truce agreement, the two countries would enter into consultation with the Commission for settling the future of the state in accordance with the will of the people.

The structure of the resolution was of significance to India. The three-part structure implicitly recognized Pakistan's "aggression" by making the truce agreement precede the consultation for the future of the state. Moreover, plebiscite was not mentioned, which allowed for other possible avenues for determining the will of the people, such as electing a constituent assembly. India feared that a plebiscite would incite religious passions and unleash "disruptive forces".

While India accepted the Commission's resolution, Pakistan attached so many reservations and qualifications that the Commission believed it was "tantamount to rejection". The Commission surmised that Pakistan's main preoccupation was the guarantee of a free and impartial plebiscite after the fighting stopped. It then developed a supplement to its August resolution outlining proposals for the administration of the plebiscite. It defined the functions of the Plebiscite Administrator who would, among others, decide the final disposal of the Indian and Azad Kashmir forces. India objected that it was being asked to make further concessions even though Pakistan had not accepted the truce agreement. It sought and obtained several assurances, including an agreement that it would not be bound by plebiscite if Pakistan did not implement the first two parts of the August resolution; and assurance that the Azad Kashmir forces would be disbanded before the plebiscite.

Despite reservations, questions and dissents, the two governments finally accepted the proposals, leading to a ceasefire in Kashmir on 1 January 1949. The Commission incorporated the supplement into a new resolution approved on 5 January 1949.

=== Elusive truce (1949) ===
The Commission returned to the subcontinent in February 1949 to implement the terms of the ceasefire, set up a truce agreement and prepare for a plebiscite. Korbel states that the Commission faced "enormous difficulties". (Note: Josef Korbel left Czechoslovakia after the communist coup. He was replaced by another Czech delegate who, according Korbel, "embarked upon the Soviet-Communist tactic of disrupting the structure of peace".)

India insisted on the disbandment of the 'Azad forces' as an "essential condition" before the plebiscite, which, according to Korbel, came as "jolt" to the Commission. This was indeed agreed in the previous round. However India appeared to have advanced the timetable. The so-called 'Azad forces' were made up of the demobilised soldiers of the British Indian Army belonging to the Poonch and Mirpur districts. They rose in revolt against the Maharaja of Jammu and Kashmir prior to the tribal invasion. Following the invasion, Pakistan organised the soldiers into 32 battalions of a serious military force and used them to fight the Indian forces. During the truce discussions, Pakistan insisted on a balance between the Azad forces and the State forces, and demanded that Pakistan be allowed to train the Azad forces to take the positions that the Pakistani forces would vacate. This led the Indians to conclude that Pakistan was planning to resume hostilities as soon as the Indian withdrawal began. Thus they demanded that the disbandment of Azad forces should occur during the truce stage itself. Pakistan rejected the demand for disbandment and insisted on parity between the Azad and State forces. Pakistan also wished to see the detailed plans of the Indian withdrawal and insisted that it should be "synchronized" with the Pakistani withdrawal.

After multiple rounds of proposals for demilitarisation, which were rejected by both India and Pakistan, the Commission proposed arbitration. Pakistan accepted the proposal for arbitration, but India rejected it, saying that it was not a matter for arbitration but for "affirmative and immediate decision". India's position was that no distinction could be made between the Pakistan Army and the Azad forces. The Commission conceded that the Azad forces now had a strength that changed the military situation and made the Indian withdrawal as envisaged in the original resolution difficult.

Another difficulty arose with regard to the "Northern Areas" (present day Gilgit-Baltistan). India demanded that, upon Pakistani withdrawal, these areas should be restored to the government of Jammu and Kashmir and India should be allowed to defend its borders. The Commission conceded the legal basis of the Indian demand but feared that it would cause renewed fighting between the Indian forces and the local forces. It proposed that the areas should be governed by "local authorities" under the supervision of the Commission and Indian forces would be sent only if the UN observers notified it of their necessity. This compromise was rejected by both India and Pakistan.

The Commission declared its failure and submitted its final report to the Security Council on 9 December 1949. It recommended that the Commission be replaced by a single mediator; that the problem of demilitarisation be viewed as a whole without the required sequentiality of the August resolution; that the UN representatives should have the authority to settle issues by arbitration. The Czech delegate submitted a minority report contending that the Commission's declaration of failure was premature, that the problem of Azad forces had been underrated, and that the Northern Areas did not receive adequate attention.

== Aftermath ==
The Security Council asked its Canadian delegate, General A. G. L. McNaughton, to informally consult India and Pakistan towards a demilitarisation plan. In the course of his discussion, on 22 December 1949, McNaughton proposed that both Pakistani and Indian forces should be reduced to a minimum level, followed by the disbandment of both the Azad forces and the State forces. India proposed two far-reaching amendments, in effect rejecting the McNaughton proposals. The McNaughton proposals represented an important departure from those of the UNCIP resolutions in that they treated India and Pakistan on an equal footing. India was averse to such an equation.

Despite India's apparent objection, the Security Council adopted the McNaughton proposals in Resolution 80 and appointed a mediator. The mediation also ended in failure.

In 1972, following the Indo-Pakistani War of 1971, India and Pakistan signed the Simla Agreement, agreeing to resolve all their differences through bilateral negotiations. The United States, United Kingdom and most Western governments have since supported this approach.

In 2001, the then Secretary-General of the United Nations, Kofi Annan during his visit to India and Pakistan, clarified that Kashmir resolutions are only advisory recommendations and they should not be compared to those on East Timor and Iraq.

In 2003, the then Pakistan President Pervez Musharraf announced that Pakistan was willing to "leave aside" the demand for UN resolutions and explore alternative bilateral options for resolving the dispute.

In 2020, the UN secretary-general António Guterres called for the implementation of UN Security Council resolutions on Kashmir, including the holding of a plebiscite among Kashmir's residents on whether they wanted join India or Pakistan.

== See also ==
- Kashmir conflict
- Timeline of the Kashmir conflict
- Indo-Pakistani relations
- List of United Nations Security Council Resolutions 1 to 100 (1946–1953)

== Bibliography ==
- Ankit, Rakesh (September 2014). Kashmir, 1945–66: From Empire to the Cold War (PhD thesis). University of Southampton.
- Blinkenberg, Lars (1998), India-Pakistan: The historical part, Odense University Press, ISBN 978-87-7838-286-3
- Bose, Sumantra (2003), Kashmir: Roots of Conflict, Paths to Peace, Harvard University Press, ISBN 978-0-674-01173-1
- Cheema, Zafar Iqbal (2009), "The strategic context of the Kargil conflict: A Pakistani perspective", in Peter René Lavoy (ed.), Asymmetric Warfare in South Asia: The Causes and Consequences of the Kargil Conflict, Cambridge University Press, pp. 41–63, ISBN 978-0-521-76721-7
- Das Gupta, Jyoti Bhusan (2012), Jammu and Kashmir, Springer, ISBN 978-94-011-9231-6
- Korbel, Josef (May 1949), "The Kashmir Dispute and the United Nations", International Organization, 3 (2): 278–287, doi:10.1017/s0020818300020610, JSTOR 2703744
- Korbel, Josef (1953), "The Kashmir dispute after six years", International Organization, 7 (4): 498–510, doi:10.1017/s0020818300007256, JSTOR 2704850
- Korbel, Josef (1966) [1954], Danger in Kashmir, Princeton University Press, ISBN 9781400875238
- Kux, Dennis (1992), India and the United States: Estranged Democracies, 1941–1991, DIANE Publishing, ISBN 978-0-7881-0279-0
- Lyon, Peter (2008), Conflict Between India and Pakistan: An Encyclopedia, ABC-CLIO, ISBN 978-1-57607-712-2
- Raghavan, Srinath (2010), War and Peace in Modern India: A Strategic History of the Nehru Years, Palgrave Macmillan, ISBN 978-1-137-00737-7
- Roberts, Adam; Welsh, Jennifer (2010), The United Nations Security Council and War: The Evolution of Thought and Practice Since 1945, Oxford University Press, ISBN 978-0-19-958330-0
- Schaffer, Howard B. (2009), The Limits of Influence: America's Role in Kashmir, Brookings Institution Press, ISBN 978-0-8157-0370-9
- Subbiah, Sumathi (2004), "Security Council Mediation and the Kashmir Dispute: Reflections on Its Failures and Possibilities for Renewal", Boston College International and Comparative Law Review, 27 (1): 173–185
- UNCIP (22 November 1948), First Interim Report of the UNCIP (S/1100) (PDF), United Nations Digital Library, archived (PDF) from the original on 2 October 2016 – via hpcrresearch.org and archive.org
- UNCIP (10 January 1949a), Second Interim Report of the UNCIP (S/1196) (PDF), United Nations Digital Library, archived (PDF) from the original on 25 July 2021 – via hpcrresearch.org and archive.org
- UNCIP (9 December 1949b), Third Interim Report of the UNCIP (S/1430) (PDF), United Nations Digital Library
