= UN mediation of the Kashmir dispute =

United Nations mediation of the India–Pakistan dispute in Kashmir

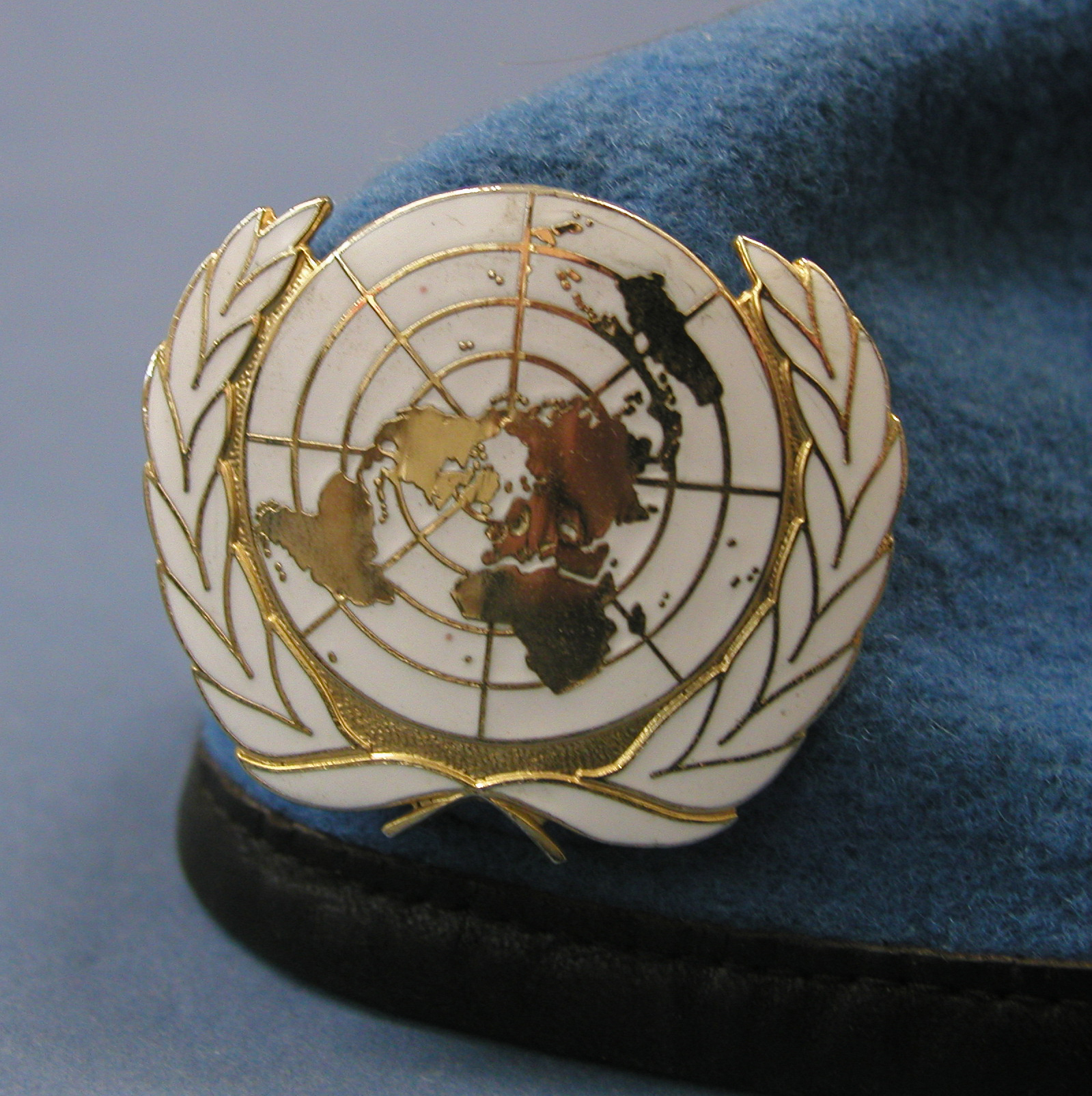
United Nations blue beret with UN badge worn by UN Military Observer Richard Cooper in India and Kashmir, c. 1973–1974

The United Nations has played an advisory role in maintaining peace and order in the Kashmir region soon after the independence and partition of British India into the dominions of Pakistan and India in 1947, when a dispute erupted between the two new States on the question of accession over the princely state of Jammu and Kashmir. India took this matter to the UN Security Council, which passed resolution 39 (1948) and established the United Nations Commission for India and Pakistan (UNCIP) to investigate the issues and mediate between the two new countries. Following the cease-fire of hostilities, it also established the United Nations Military Observer Group in India and Pakistan (UNMOGIP) to monitor the cease-fire line.

== Overview ==
=== 1948–1951 ===
Following the outbreak of the Indo-Pakistani War of 1947, India's Governor General Mountbatten flew to Lahore on 1 November 1947 for a conference with Muhammad Ali Jinnah, proposing that, in all the princely States where the ruler did not accede to a Dominion corresponding to the majority population (which would have included Junagadh, Hyderabad as well Kashmir), the accession should be decided by an 'impartial reference to the will of the people'. Jinnah rejected the offer. The Prime Ministers Jawaharlal Nehru and Liaquat Ali Khan met again in December, where Nehru informed Khan of India's intention to refer the dispute to the United Nations under article 35 (Chapter VI) of the UN Charter, which allows the member states to bring to the Security Council attention situations `likely to endanger the maintenance of international peace'.

India sought resolution of the issue at the UN Security Council (UNSC) on 1 January 1948. Following the set-up of the United Nations Commission for India and Pakistan (UNCIP), the UN Security Council passed Resolution 47 on 21 April 1948. The measure imposed an immediate cease-fire and called on the Government of Pakistan 'to secure the withdrawal from the state of Jammu and Kashmir of tribesmen and Pakistani nationals not normally resident therein who have entered the state for the purpose of fighting.' It also asked Government of India to reduce its forces to minimum strength, after which the circumstances for holding a plebiscite should be put into effect 'on the question of Accession of the state to India or Pakistan.' However, it was not until 1 January 1949 that the ceasefire could be put into effect, signed by General Gracey on behalf of Pakistan and General Roy Bucher on behalf of India.

The UNCIP made three visits to the subcontinent between 1948 and 1949, trying to find a solution agreeable to both India and Pakistan. It reported to the Security Council in August 1948 that "the presence of troops of Pakistan" inside Kashmir represented a "material change" in the situation. A two-part process was proposed for the withdrawal of forces. In the first part, Pakistan was to withdraw its forces as well as other Pakistani nationals from the state. In the second part, "when the Commission shall have notified the Government of India" that Pakistani withdrawal has been completed, India was to withdraw the bulk of its forces. After both the withdrawals were completed, a plebiscite would be held. The resolution was accepted by India but effectively rejected by Pakistan.

The Indian government considered itself to be under legal possession of Jammu and Kashmir by virtue of the accession of the state. The assistance given by Pakistan to the rebel forces and the Pakhtoon tribes was held to be a hostile act and the further involvement of the Pakistan army was taken to be an invasion of Indian territory. From the Indian perspective, the plebiscite was meant to confirm the accession, which was in all respects already complete, and Pakistan could not aspire to an equal footing with India in the contest.

The Pakistan government held that the state of Jammu and Kashmir had executed a Standstill Agreement with Pakistan which precluded it from entering into agreements with other countries. It also held that the Maharaja had no authority left to execute accession because his people had revolted and he had to flee the capital. It believed that the Azad Kashmir movement as well as the tribal incursions were indigenous and spontaneous, and Pakistan's assistance to them was not open to criticism.

In short, India required an asymmetric treatment of the two countries in the withdrawal arrangements regarding Pakistan as an 'aggressor', whereas Pakistan insisted on parity. The UN mediators tended towards parity, which was not to India's satisfaction. In the end, no withdrawal was ever carried out, India insisting that Pakistan had to withdraw first, and Pakistan contending that there was no guarantee that India would withdraw afterwards. No agreement could be reached between the two countries on the process of demilitarisation.

Scholars have commented that the failure of the Security Council efforts of mediation owed to the fact that the council regarded the issue as a purely political dispute without investigating its legal underpinnings.

Period	Adopted resolutions	Notes
1948–1951 (First Kashmir War)	UNSC Resolution 38	India approaches the UN. UN requests the two parties to calm down.
1948–1951 (First Kashmir War)	UNSC Resolutions 39, 47, 51	UNSC establishes the UNCIP and issues instructions to it.
1948–1951 (First Kashmir War)	UNCIP Resolutions of 13 August 1948 and 5 January 1949	UNCIP unanimously adopts a resolution amending and amplifying the UN Resolution 47. It deals with a ceasefire, truce agreement and further consultation with the commission. This eventually leads to the Karachi agreement.
1948–1951 (First Kashmir War)	UNSC Resolutions 80, 91, 96, 98	UNCIP fails in its overall task. UNCIP terminated. UNMOGIP constituted. Ceasefire acknowledged. Demilitarization attempts furthered.

=== 1951–1957 ===
The India-Pakistan question was not a part of the agenda for the UNSC from 1953 and 1957. During this period, both India and Pakistan made internal decisions that worsened each other's perception of the other's stance on Kashmir. Pakistan became a part of the military alliances Southeast Asia Treaty Organization (SEATO) and Central Treaty Organisation (CENTO). India saw nationalist movements from 1954 onwards. Organizations such as Bhartiya Jana Sangha demanded integration. The main trigger for Pakistan to appeal to the UNSC was the adoption of the Constitution of Jammu and Kashmir in November 1956 which stated "The State of Jammu and Kashmir is and will be a part of Union of India".

Period	Adopted resolutions	Notes
1957	UNSC Resolutions 122	UNSC reminds both parties of previous resolutions.
1957	Soviet Union veto	Rejection of a joint draft resolution through Soviet veto on 20 February 1957
1957	UNSC Resolutions 123, 126	"Resolution requesting the President of the Security Council to examine with India and Pakistan any proposals likely to contribute to the settlement of the dispute. Requesting the United Nations Representative of India and Pakistan to make any recommendations to the parties for further appropriate action with a view to making progress toward the implementation of the resolutions of the UNCIP and toward a peaceful settlement."

=== 1962–1972 ===
Through a letter on 1 January 1962 Pakistan asked for a meeting of the UNSC. Shortly after, India said that such a meeting was not required. This continued until the UNSC eventually held discussions on the India-Pakistan question on 1 February 1962 and between 27 April and 22 June 1962. Following the Second Kashmir War, India and Pakistan signed the Tashkent Declaration. The Tashkent Declaration by-passed the United Nations and was brokered by the Soviet Union. The liberation of Bangladesh and 1972 Simla Agreement made India harden its stance on aversion to United Nations mediation on Kashmir.

Period	Adopted resolutions	Notes
1962	Draft resolution dated 22 June 1962 not adopted	The draft resolution failed adoption with 7 votes in favour and 2 against, with 2 abstentions. One of the negative votes was of the Soviet Union.
1965 (Second Kashmir War)	UNSC Resolutions 209, 210, 211, 214, 215	UN concerned about situation along ceasefire line. Demands ceasefire and that representatives of India and Pakistan meet with a representative of the secretary-general. Following a speech by the Pakistani Foreign Minister, India conducts a walkout from the UN. United Nations India-Pakistan Observation Mission (UNIPOM) successful.
1971 (Indo-Pakistani War of 1971)	UNSC Resolutions 303, 307	With respect to Indo-Pakistani War of 1971, UN calls for cessation of hostilities.

=== 1972–present ===
1972 onwards, UNSC no longer passed any resolution on the India-Pakistan question. Pakistan independently and through bodies such as the Organisation of Islamic Cooperation, continues to raise the issue at the United Nations General Assembly. The Office of the United Nations High Commissioner for Human Rights, and UN Secretary General over the years have commented upon the issue. The OHCHR came out with two reports in 2018 and 2019.

The UNMOGIP is still functional. According to the secretary-general the UNMOGIP can only be abolished through a UNSC decision. However, India has maintained that the Simla agreement of July 1972, which stipulated that both countries would settle differences peacefully through bilateral negotiations rendered previous Council resolutions redundant.

Following the revocation of the special status of Jammu and Kashmir, the UNSC discussed the Kashmir question at least three times. However no resolutions was taken and no statement issued.

== Mediatory reports ==
Mediatory reports include:

- UNCIP: 4
- Andrew McNaughton, Owen Dixon, Gunnar Jarring: 1 each
- Frank Graham: 6

=== McNaughton proposals ===
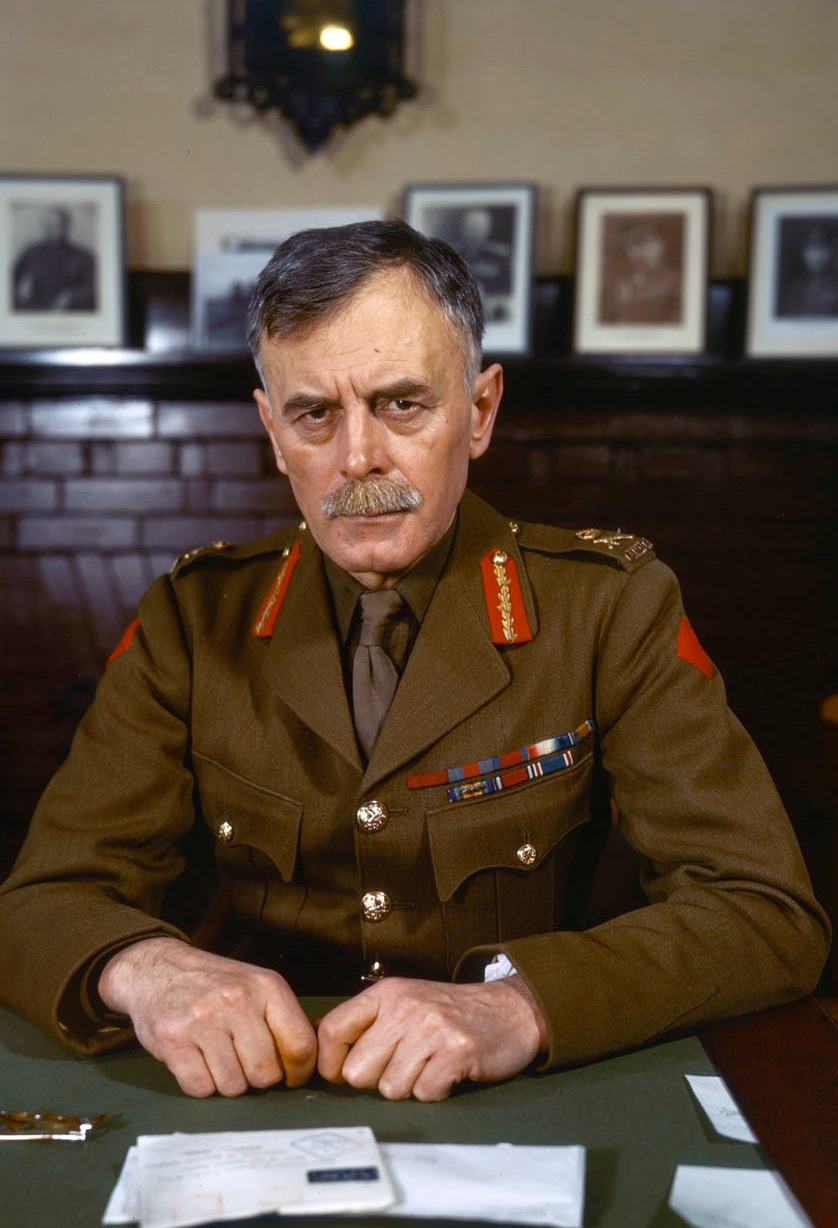
Andrew McNaughton

In December 1949 the Canadian president of the UNSC, General McNaughton, was requested by the council to approach the two states to solve the dispute. McNaughton issued both states on 22 December with his proposals and two days before his term as president of the council was to expire he reported back to the UNSC, on 29 December. But the council asked him to continue his mediation and he did so, submitting his final report on 3 February 1950.

His proposal enclosed a scheme whereby Pakistan and India would simultaneously withdraw their regular forces (excluding those Indian regular forces needed for security purposes). The Azad Kashmir Regular Force & Jammu and Kashmir State forces (and other militia) would both be demobilized. The Northern Areas would also be demilitarised and its administration would remain with the local authorities, under UN supervision. Pakistan accepted his suggestions but India proposed two far-reaching amendments which amounted to a rejection.

The proposals treated India and Pakistan as equal participants in the dispute which was not acceptable to India. In India's view, Pakistan was present illegally in Kashmir while India was present legally. The United States warned India that it would have no option but to comply with any decision that the Security Council may opt for because by rejecting the McNaugton proposals it would be the third successive time India spurned the conclusions of a neutral UN representative, upon which Nehru accused the US of pressurizing his government. India's rejections of the McNaugton proposals were viewed by American policymakers as an example of Indian "intransigence."

The McNaughton proposals, widely supported in the Security Council, led to the passage of a resolution on 14 March 1950 that recognized Pakistan as an equal party in the Kashmir dispute and allotted both India and Pakistan a five-month period to implement a demilitarisation plan; while Pakistan accepted the resolution, India unequivocally rejected it. The council then appointed Sir Owen Dixon as the next UN representative to the two countries; and he was tasked with administering McNaughton's demilitarisation scheme, which India had already rejected.

=== Dixon mission ===
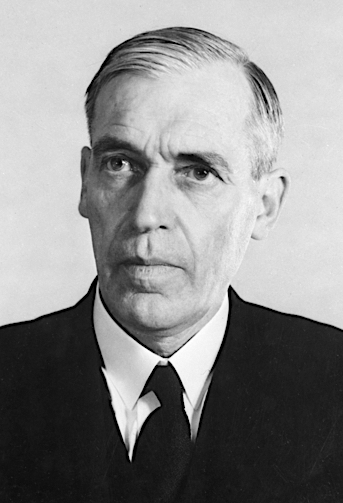
Owen Dixon

On the Pakistani side of the ceasefire line, Sir Owen Dixon proposed that the areas demilitarized by Pakistan would be governed by the local authorities under supervision by the commission, according to the "law and custom" of the State before the conflict started. India opposed this idea because it believed that the local authorities were biased in Pakistan's favour and this would not be in India's interests. However, India did not offer any substitute ideas.

On the Indian side of the ceasefire line, Dixon proposed attaching a United Nations officer with each district magistrate who would be allowed to inspect and report on the magistrate's reports and proceedings. Nehru objected to this idea by claiming that it would intrude on the state's sovereignty. Nehru again offered no alternative idea.

Next, Dixon put before the prime ministers of the two countries some proposals such as establishing a coalition government between Sheikh Abdullah and Ghulam Abbas or distributing the portfolios between the various parties. Dixon's second suggestion was to establish a neutral government by respectable non-political people for a six-month period prior to a referendum, in which membership would be split between Hindus and Muslims equally, under United Nations supervision. Dixon's third suggestion was to install an administrative body made up completely of representatives from the UN. Nehru disagreed with all these suggestions. Sir Owen Dixon criticized India for its negative reactions to all the demilitarization proposals. Sir Owen Dixon took India to task in very strong language for its negative reactions to the various alternative proposals for demilitarisation.

Dixon next asked Nehru in the presence of the Pakistani Prime Minister whether it would be advisable to have plebiscites by region and allocate each region according to the results of a plebiscite in each. India reacted favourably to this plan. According to the Indian commentator Raghavan, it was first Nehru who proposed a partition-cum-plebiscite plan: Jammu and Ladakh would go to India, Azad Kashmir and Northern Areas to Pakistan, and a plebiscite would be held in the Kashmir Valley. Dixon favoured the plan, which bears his name till this day. Dixon agreed that people in Jammu and Ladakh were clearly in favour of India; equally clearly, those in Azad Kashmir and the Northern Areas wanted to be part of Pakistan. This left the Kashmir Valley and 'perhaps some adjacent country' around Muzaffarabad in uncertain political terrain. However, according to Dixon, Pakistan "bluntly rejected" the proposal. It believed that the plebiscite should be held in the entire state or the state should be partitioned along religious lines. Pakistan believed that India's commitment to a plebiscite for the whole of Jammu and Kashmir should not be departed from.

Dixon also had concerns that the Kashmiris, not being high-spirited people, may vote under fear or improper influences. Following Pakistan's objections, he proposed that Sheikh Abdullah administration should be held in "commission" (in abeyance) while the plebiscite was held. This was not acceptable to India. According to Raghavan, at this point, Dixon lost patience and declared failure.

Another reason India declined Dixon's proposals for a limited plebiscite was that India wanted to keep its own troops in Kashmir during the plebiscite, claiming they were necessary for "security reasons", but at the same time India did not want any Pakistani troops to remain. This contradicted the Dixon plan which had stipulated that neither India nor Pakistan would be permitted to retain troops in the plebiscite zone.

Dixon felt that India would not agree to demilitarisation and other provisions governing the plebiscite that guard against influence and abuse. In the absence of Indian demilitarization, the Pakistanis and the Azad forces were unwilling to demilitarise the territory under their administration. Dixon's final comment was to suggest that India and Pakistan be left to solve the situation on their own.

The failure of the Dixon mission served to increase the American ambassador Loy Henderson's distrust of India. Henderson in his own assessment upon visiting the Kashmir Valley observed that the majority of people in the Valley would vote to join Pakistan in a plebiscite rather than remain with India. He observed that if given the choice, most Kashmiris would opt for a third option: independence. Henderson believed that because of Indian allegations, kindled by Nehru, that America was biased in favour of Pakistan, the Americans ought to distance themselves from the Kashmir dispute, which Washington did so in 1950.

=== Frank Graham's mediation ===
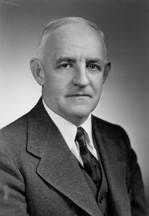
Frank Porter Graham

Pakistan vetoed Ralph Bunche as the next mediator.

When Dixon's successor, Frank Graham, arrived in the subcontinent during a time of tension, he tried to effect demilitarisation prior to a plebiscite but India and Pakistan could not agree on the number of troops who were to remain in Kashmir.

Frank Graham was appointed by the Security Council as the UN representative for India and Pakistan on 30 April 1951. Graham arrived in the subcontinent on 30 June 1951. The Graham mission had to reach an agreement between the two countries concerning the demilitarisation of Kashmir. Similar to the experience of previous UN representatives, Graham had first proposed a demilitarisation scheme which found acceptance from Pakistan but rejection from India. Thereafter, Graham gave an alternative proposal whereby both countries were to gradually reduce their forces to minimal levels and to the ratio of their presence in the state on 1 January 1949. This proposal was accepted by Pakistan but rejected by India.

Graham offered a fresh set of proposals on 16 July 1952. By them Pakistan would reduce its forces to a quantity between 3,000 and 6,000 and India would reduce its troops numbers to between 12,000 and 16,000. But the state militias on the Indian side and the Gilgit and Northern Scouts on Pakistan's side were not included in these figures. Because Pakistan was hopeful for a plebiscite it accepted this plan but India did not accept it, perhaps because the question of irregular forces was not solved. Graham revised the figures so that 6,000 would be the limit of Pakistan's forces and 18,000 would be the limit for India's forces. The response of India was to propose that it be allowed to keep 21,000 troops (including the state militia) in its side but that Pakistan be allowed only a 4,000 strong civilian force. Graham reported his failure to the Security Council, which subsequently passed a resolution in December 1951 calling for India and Pakistan to come to an agreement on reducing the size of their forces. The resolution requested Pakistan to reduce its military presence to 3,000–6,000 and that India to cut its own troop numbers to a number between 12,000 and 18,000. The Security Council urged both countries to consider Graham's criterion for troop reductions which he had suggested on 4 September 1951. Pakistan agreed to the Security Council resolution but India did not and gave no reason for its rejection.

Graham then tried to make the mediation move forward and, without proposing a parallel increase of Pakistani forces, gave a proposal which would allow India to keep 21,000 troops as had been India's demand. This proposal was also unsuccessful. Graham submitted a second report to the United Nations in December to recount the failure of his endeavors to achieve a demilitarisation for a plebiscite. His third submission to the UN in April 1952 relayed some headway on the demilitarisation question as both countries had begun withdrawing forces since March. But by the fourth report in October 1952 Graham had to inform the Security Council that the negotiations had stumbled again over the question of the size and type of forces to be permitted for both sides. The Security Council then adopted a resolution asking that the two nations hold direct talks over this question. There were talks in February 1953 in Geneva but the UN representative realised that this method would be unsuccessful. On 27 March 1953 Graham presented his final report and his mediatory efforts ended. The two questions during this mediation which India and Pakistan differed upon was the number of troops to remain after demilitarisation on each side and when the plebiscite administrator could assume their tasks.

== United Nations Military Observer Group in India and Pakistan ==
United Nations Military Observer Group in India and Pakistan
- Abbreviation: UNMOGIP
- Formation: 30 March 1951; 75 years ago
- Type: Peacekeeping Mission
- Legal status: Active
- Headquarters: Islamabad (November to April) and Srinagar (May to October)
- Parent organization: United Nations Security Council
- Website: unmogip.unmissions.org

The Security Council Resolution 47 (1948) also enlarged the membership of the UNCIP to five members. India and Pakistan signed the Karachi Agreement in July 1949 and established a ceasefire line to be supervised by observers. The first group of these unarmed observers arrived in the mission area in January 1949 to oversee the ceasefire between India and Pakistan. After the termination of the UNCIP, the Security Council passed Resolution 91 (1951) and established the United Nations Military Observer Group in India and Pakistan (UNMOGIP) to observe and report violations of the ceasefire.

After the Indo-Pakistani War of 1971, the two countries signed the Simla Agreement in 1972 to define the Line of Control in Kashmir. India and Pakistan disagree on UNMOGIP's mandate in Kashmir because India argued that the mandate of UNMOGIP has lapsed after the Simla agreement because it was specifically established to observe ceasefire according to the Karachi Agreement.

However, the secretary-general of the United Nations maintained that the UNMOGIP should continue to function because no resolution has been passed to terminate it. India has partially restricted the activities of the unarmed 45 UN observers on the Indian side of the Line of Control on the grounds that the mandate of UNMOGIP has lapsed.

Despite the limitations on its mandate, UNMOGIP continues to operate in the region by reporting on the situation along the Line of Control (LoC) in Jammu and Kashmir. The primary tasks of UNMOGIP include observing and reporting, investigating complaints of ceasefire violations, and submitting its findings to each party and to the Secretary-General. The mission plays a crucial role in monitoring and reporting on the situation along the Line of Control (LoC), thereby contributing to the maintenance of peace and stability in the region.

UNMOGIP has encountered several obstacles in fulfilling its mandate. These include restrictions on the movement of UNMOGIP officials, long delays in obtaining visas, and difficulties in conducting operational tasks.

In 2023, a high-ranking UN official reported that the ceasefire along the LoC is being maintained, with only two violations reported. Moreover, the Lieutenant Governor of Jammu and Kashmir, Manoj Sinha, has stated that the government will investigate the issue regarding the closure of the United Nations office in Kashmir.

== Gallery ==
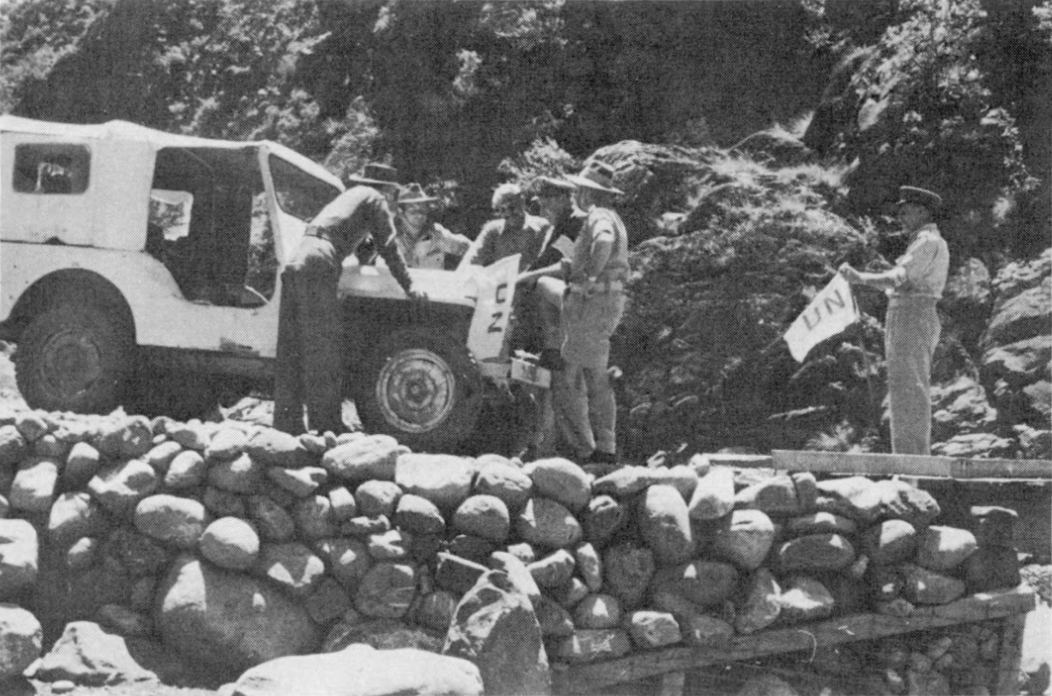
UN observers monitor a border discussion between Indian and Pakistani officers, 1962

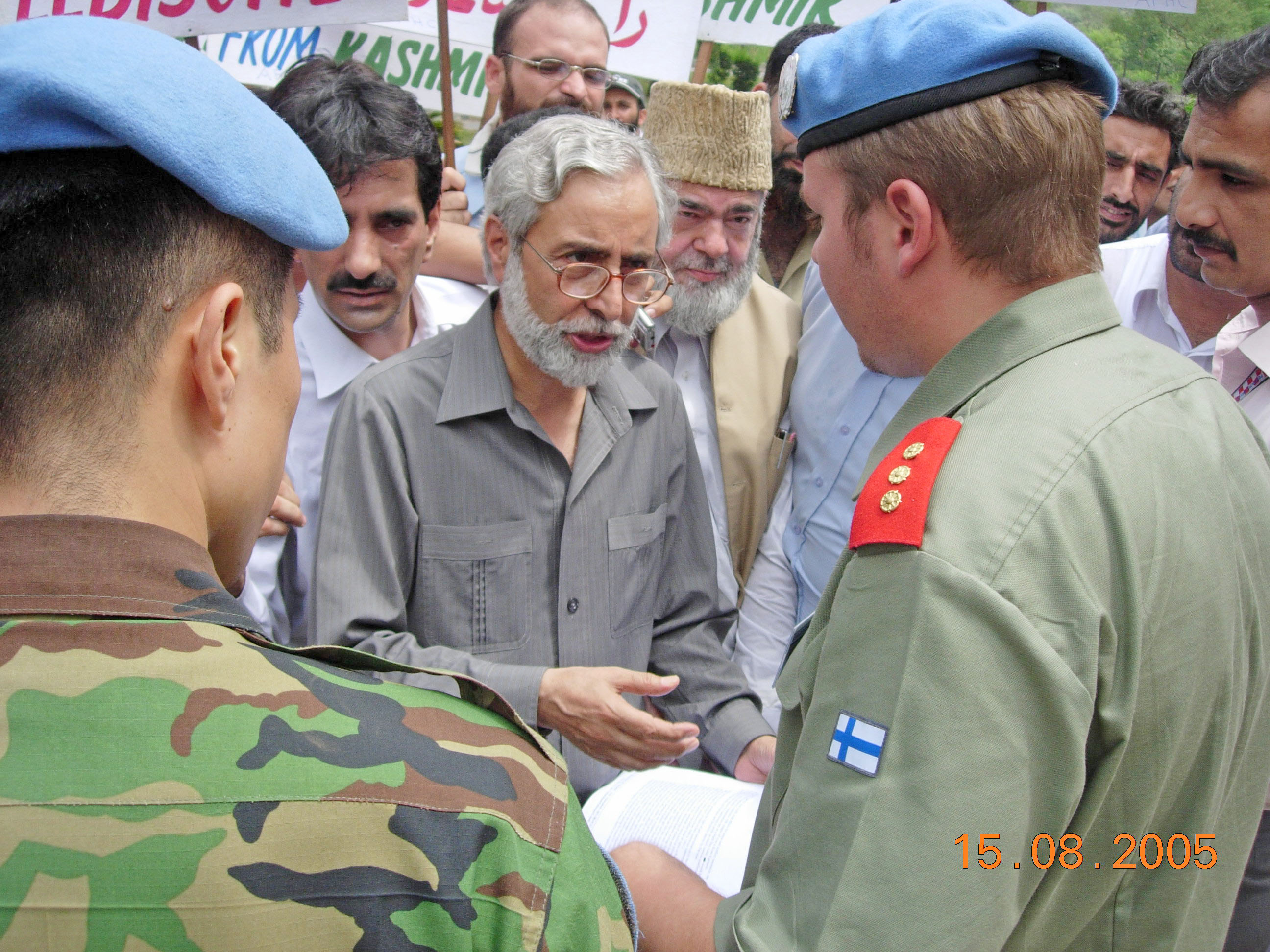
Muhammad Farooq Rehmani, Hurriyat Conference, presenting a memo to UN officials in Azad jammu and Kashmir (PAKISTAN), 2005

== See also ==
- UN Security Council resolutions concerning the Kashmir conflict: Resolution 38, 39, 47, 51, 80, 91, 98, 122, 123, 126, 209, 210, 211, 214, 215, 303, 307
- Kashmir conflict
- OHCHR reports on Kashmir
- United Nations fact-finding mission

== Bibliography ==
- Ankit, Rakesh (2013), "Britain and Kashmir, 1948: "The Arena of the UN"", Diplomacy & Statecraft, 24 (2): 273–290, doi:10.1080/09592296.2013.789771, S2CID 154021048
- Bose, Sumantra (2003). Kashmir: Roots of Conflict, Paths to Peace. Harvard University Press. ISBN 978-0-674-01173-1.
- Bradnock, Robert (1998). "Regional geopolitics in a globalising world: Kashmir in geopolitical perspective". Geopolitics. 3 (2): 1–29. doi:10.1080/14650049808407617.
- Hilali, AZ (1997). "Kashmir dispute and UN mediation efforts: An historical perspective". Small Wars & Insurgencies. 8 (2): 61–86. doi:10.1080/09592319708423174.
- Schaffer, Howard B. (1 September 2009). The Limits of Influence: America's Role in Kashmir. Brookings Institution Press. ISBN 978-0-8157-0370-9.
- Howley, James (1991). "Alive and Kicking: The Kashmir Dispute Forty Years Later". Penn State International Law Review. 9 (1).
- Korbel, Josef (8 December 2015). Danger in Kashmir. Princeton University Press. ISBN 978-1-4008-7523-8.
- —Korbel, Josef (1953), "The Kashmir dispute after six years", International Organization, 7 (4): 498–510, doi:10.1017/s0020818300007256, JSTOR 2704850, S2CID 155022750
- Gupta, Jyoti Bhusan Das (1968). Jammu and Kashmir. The Hauge, Netherlands: Martinus Nijhoff Publishers. ISBN 978-94-011-9231-6.
- Noorani, A. G. (2014) [first published in 2013 by Tulika Books], The Kashmir Dispute, 1947–2012, Oxford University Press, ISBN 978-0-19-940018-8
- Panigrahi, D. N. (2009), Jammu and Kashmir, the Cold War and the West, Routledge, ISBN 978-1-136-51751-8
- Raghavan, Srinath (2010). War and Peace in Modern India. Palgrave Macmillan. ISBN 9780230242159.
- Rai, Mridu (2004). Hindu Rulers, Muslim Subjects: Islam, Rights, and the History of Kashmir. C. Hurst & Co. ISBN 978-1850656616.
- McMahon, Robert J. (1994). The Cold War on the Periphery: The United States, India, and Pakistan. Columbia University Press. ISBN 978-0-231-51467-5.
- Shakoor, Farzana (1998). "UN and Kashmir". Pakistan Horizon. 51 (2): 53–69. ISSN 0030-980X. JSTOR 41394458.
- Schofield, Victoria (2003) [First published in 2000], Kashmir in Conflict, London and New York: I.B. Taurus & Co, ISBN 978-1860648984
- —Schofield, Victoria (2010). Kashmir in Conflict: India, Pakistan and the Unending War. I.B. Tauris. ISBN 978-0-85773-078-7.
- Snedden, Christopher (2013) [first published as The Untold Story of the People of Azad Kashmir, 2012], Kashmir: The Unwritten History, HarperCollins India, ISBN 978-9350298985
- Subbiah, Sumathi (2004), "Security Council Mediation and the Kashmir Dispute: Reflections on Its Failures and Possibilities for Renewal", Boston College International and Comparative Law Review, 27 (1): 173–185
- Varshney, Ashutosh (1992). "Three Compromised Nationalisms: Why Kashmir has been a Problem" (PDF). In Raju G. C. Thomas (ed.). Perspectives on Kashmir: the roots of conflict in South Asia. Westview Press. pp. 191–234. ISBN 978-0-8133-8343-9.
- Whitehead, Andrew (2007). A Mission in Kashmir. Penguin India.
