= United Nations Security Council Resolution 215 =

UN Security Council Resolution 215
- UN emblem
- Date: November 5 1965
- Meeting no.: 1251
- Subject: The India–Pakistan Question
- Voting summary: 9 voted for; None voted against; 2 abstained
- Result: Adopted

Security Council composition
- Permanent members: China; France; Soviet Union; United Kingdom; United States
- Non-permanent members: Bolivia; Ivory Coast; Jordan; Malaysia; Netherlands; Uruguay

United Nations Security Council Resolution 215, adopted on November 5, 1965, after the cease-fire called for in resolutions 209, 210, 211 and 214 and agreed to by India and Pakistan failed to materialize, the Council demanded that representatives of India and Pakistan meet with a representative of the Secretary-General to purpose schedules for the withdrawals. The Council urged this meeting to take place as soon as possible and requested the Secretary-General to submit a report on compliance with this resolution.

The resolution was adopted with nine votes to two; Jordan and the Soviet Union abstained.

== See also ==
- Indo-Pakistani War of 1965
- Kashmir conflict
- List of United Nations Security Council Resolutions 201 to 300 (1965–1971)
