= United Nations Security Council Resolution 98 =

UN Security Council Resolution 98
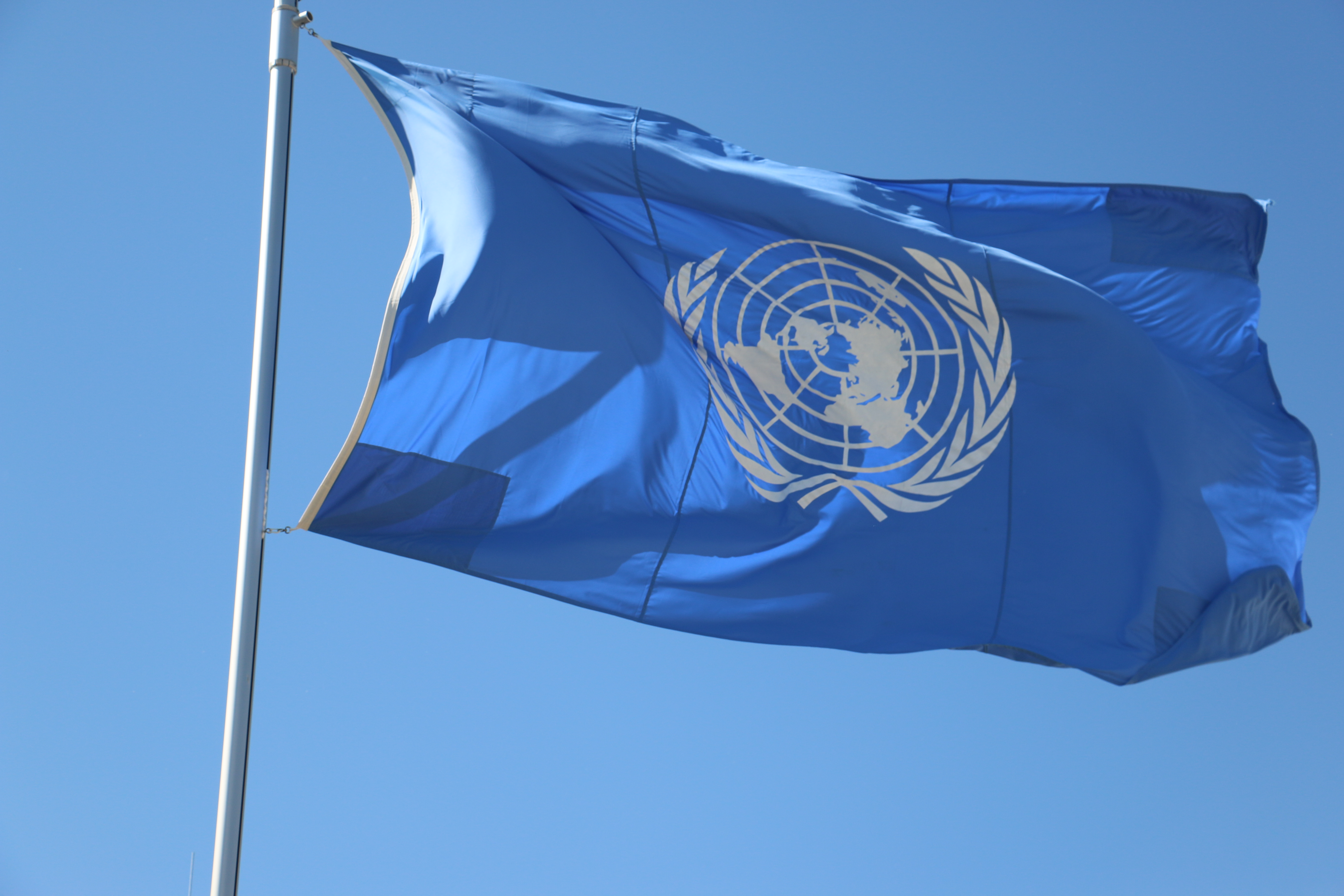
- UN flag
- Date: December 23 1952
- Meeting no.: 611
- Code: S/2883 (Document)
- Subject: The India–Pakistan Question
- Voting summary: 9 voted for; None voted against; 1 abstained; 1 present not voting
- Result: Adopted

Security Council composition
- Permanent members: China; France; Soviet Union; United Kingdom; United States
- Non-permanent members: Brazil; Chile; Greece; Netherlands; Pakistan; Turkey

United Nations Security Council Resolution 98, adopted on December 23, 1952, urged the Governments of India and Pakistan to enter into immediate negotiations under the auspices of the United Nations Representative for India and Pakistan in order to reach an agreement on the specific number of troops to remain of each side of the cease-fire line at the end of the previously established period of demilitarization. As proposed by the UN Representative this number was to be between 6000 Azad forces and 3500 Gilgit and northern scouts on the Pakistani side and 18000 Indian forces and 6000 local state forces on the Indian side. The resolution then thanked the UN Representative for his efforts, requested the Governments of India and Pakistan report to the Council no later than 30 days after the adoption of this resolution and asked the UN Representative to keep the Council informed of any progress.

The resolution was adopted by nine votes to none. The Soviet Union abstained and Pakistan did not participate in the voting.

== See also ==
- List of United Nations Security Council Resolutions 1 to 100 (1946–1953)
- United Nations Security Council Resolution 91
- United Nations Security Council Resolution 96
