= United Nations Security Council Resolution 122 =

UN Security Council Resolution 122
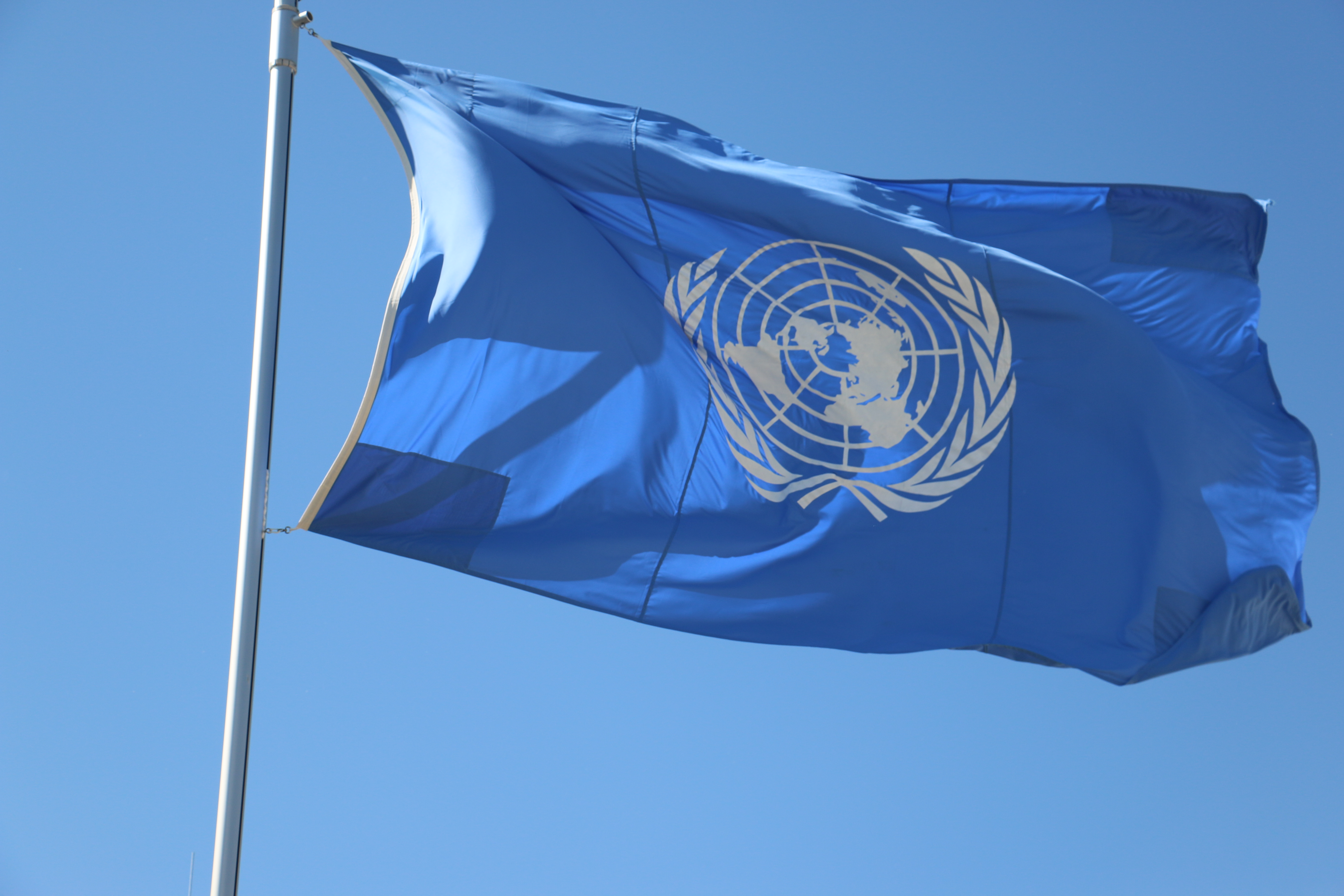
- UN flag
- Date: January 24 1957
- Meeting no.: 765
- Code: S/3779 (Document)
- Subject: The India–Pakistan Question
- Voting summary: 10 voted for; None voted against; 1 abstained
- Result: Adopted

Security Council composition
- Permanent members: China; France; Soviet Union; United Kingdom; United States
- Non-permanent members: Australia; Colombia; Cuba; Iraq; Philippines; Sweden

United Nations Security Council Resolution 122 was adopted on 24 January 1957 and concerned the dispute between the governments of India and Pakistan over the territories of Jammu and Kashmir. It was the first of three security resolutions in 1957 (along with resolutions 123 and 126) to deal with the dispute between the countries. The resolution declares that the assembly proposed by the Jammu and Kashmir National Conference could not constitute a solution to the problem as defined in United Nations Security Council Resolution 91 which had been adopted almost six years earlier.

Resolution 122 was passed by 10 votes to none, with the Soviet Union abstaining.

== See also ==
- Kashmir conflict
- List of United Nations Security Council Resolutions 101 to 200 (1953–1965)
