= United Nations Security Council Resolution 214 =

UN Security Council Resolution 214
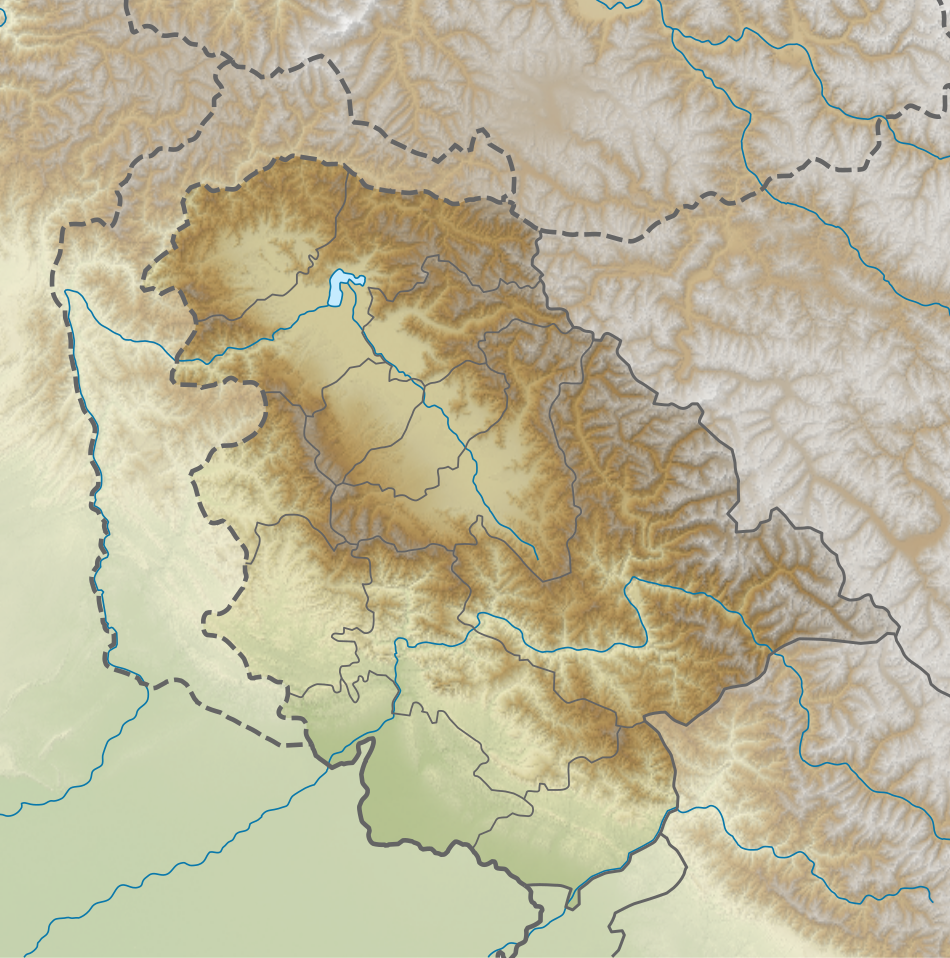
- Map of Jammu and Kashmir
- Date: September 27 1965
- Meeting no.: 1245
- Code: S/RES/214 (Document)
- Subject: The India–Pakistan Question
- Voting summary: 11 voted for; None voted against; None abstained
- Result: Adopted

Security Council composition
- Permanent members: China; France; Soviet Union; United Kingdom; United States
- Non-permanent members: Bolivia; Ivory Coast; Jordan; Malaysia; Netherlands; Uruguay

United Nations Security Council Resolution 214, adopted on September 27, 1965, after expressing concern that the cease-fire called for in resolutions 209, 210 and 211 (and agreed to by India and Pakistan) was not holding, the Council demanded that the parties honor their commitment, cease-fire and withdraw all armed personnel.

The resolution was adopted without vote.

== See also ==
- Indo-Pakistani War of 1965
- Kashmir conflict
- List of United Nations Security Council Resolutions 201 to 300 (1965–1971)
