= Jinnah–Mountbatten talks =

1947 talks to address the Kashmir conflict

Jinnah–Mountbatten Talks
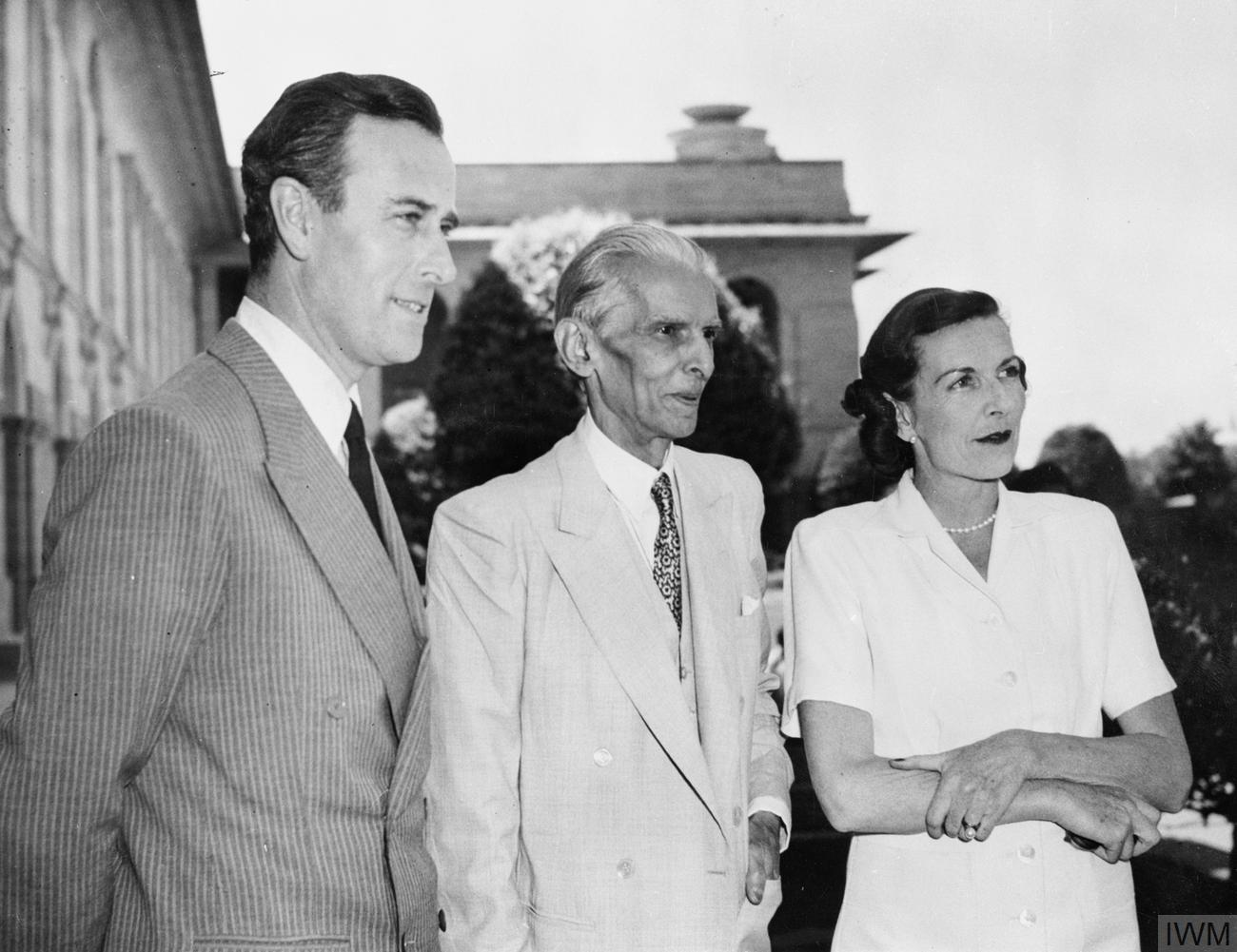
- Jinnah with the Mountbattens, circa. 1947
- Context: Pertaining to resolve the Kashmir conflict
- Sealed: 1 November 1947
- Negotiators: Muhammad Ali Jinnah (Governor-General of Pakistan); Louis Mountbatten (Governor-General of India)
- Parties: Pakistan; India
- Language: English

The Jinnah–Mountbatten talks were bilateral talks held in Lahore between the Governors-General Muhammad Ali Jinnah and Louis Mountbatten of Pakistan and India, to address the Kashmir dispute. The talks were held on 1 November 1947, five days after India dispatched its troops to defend Kashmir against a Pakistan-backed tribal invasion. In the talks, Mountbatten presented India's offer to hold an impartial plebiscite under the United Nations auspices to decide the accession of Kashmir. Jinnah effectively rejected the offer.

== Background ==
Officially, the talks were to be held between the Governors-General and Prime Ministers of India and Pakistan at the state level, focused on the Kashmir dispute in November 1947. The British government originally facilitated the negotiations in New Delhi, but the venue of the meeting was changed to Lahore. Before the negotiations started, Prime Minister Nehru fell ill and his Deputy PM, Vallabhbhai Patel, refused to come to Lahore, stating "there was nothing to discuss with Pakistan's leadership."

== Talks ==
On 1 November 1947, Louis Mountbatten left for Pakistan to begin talks between the Governors-General of India and Pakistan over the issue of Kashmir. The talks lasted for three-and-a-half hours, where Mountbatten offered to Jinnah that India would hold a plebiscite in the state of Jammu and Kashmir, provided that Pakistan withdrew its military support for the Azad Kashmir forces and their allies. Mountbatten also stipulated that the Indian Army would remain in the Kashmir Valley. Jinnah opposed the plan and claimed that the Kashmir, with its massive Muslim majority, belonged to Pakistan as an essential element in an incomplete partition process.

== Analysis ==
From the perspective of many authors, Jinnah was also convinced that a plebiscite under the supervision of the Indian Army would be sabotaged. Instead, he proposed an immediate and simultaneous withdrawal on both sides, including the Pakistani military and their allies, Pathan tribesmen, and the Indian troops. Hearing the proposal, Mountbatten told Jinnah that he needed the consent of Nehru and Patel. The talks failed to reach agreement and the Kashmir issue was referred to the United Nations.

== Bibliography ==
- Moore, Robin James (1987), Making the new Commonwealth, Clarendon Press, ISBN 978-0-19-820112-0
- Noorani, A. G. (2014) [first published in 2013 by Tulika Books], The Kashmir Dispute, 1947–2012, Oxford University Press, ISBN 978-0-19-940018-8
- Raghavan, Srinath (2010), War and Peace in Modern India, Palgrave Macmillan, ISBN 978-1-137-00737-7
- Jones, Owen Bennett (2003). Pakistan eye of the storm (2nd ed.). New Haven, Conn.: Yale University Press. ISBN 0300101473.
