= Ceasefire monitoring and verification =

Processes to monitor ceasefire in a conflict

Ceasefire monitoring and verification in general, or a ceasefire monitoring and verification mechanism specifically (also called a mission), are procedures, or a specific instance of procedures and committees, respectively, aimed at making parties in an armed conflict comply with the terms of a ceasefire via monitoring and verification.

== Motivation ==
Researchers Govinda Clayton and Valerie Sticher argued that ceasefire monitoring has three benefits: attribution of ceasefire violations, which increases the political cost of violations; distinguishing accidental from intentional violations, which reduces the risk of accidental re-escalation of the conflict; and early warnings regarding information beyond just the absence of violence, which reduces the chance of the conflict parties gaining military advantages during the ceasefire.

== Actions ==
The terminology for M&V activities typically distinguishes monitoring and verification from related activities including investigation, reporting, and dispute resolution. The reporting requirements of an M&V mechanism may be defined in the ceasefire agreement or in implementation documents.

=== Monitoring ===
Monitoring typically includes both human and technical observations, which ay be remote or on-site, continuous or periodic, passive or active. Active monitoring is more difficult during early stages of a ceasefire due to low trust levels and limited access.

=== Verification ===
Verification refers to checking the validity of reports on suspected ceasefire violations or related incidents. The methods of verification need to be defined and agreed on by the parties in conflict.

=== Investigation ===
Investigation in the M&V context refers to more detailed checking of a ceasefire violation once it is considered verified, in particular to attribute responsibility. This typically requires forensic experts, for whom full access and security guarantees are needed.

== Technology ==
Technology used in ceasefire monitoring and verification may include aerial drones, surveillance cameras, satellite imagery, radars and arrays of microphones for locating events by triangulation. Computers and software are used for information management: collecting, analysing, archiving, and interpreting data and reporting the interpretations.

The effectiveness of advanced technology for M&V, in contrast to direct observation and interviews by human observers, is expected to vary between different armed conflict situations around the world. In the case of the 2014–2022 OSCE Special Monitoring Mission to Ukraine, aerial drone usage stopped when violence escalated. As of 2022, the degree to which remote sensors help or hinder compliance with ceasefires was poorly studied.

== Organising ==
The human organisational components of ceasefire monitoring and verification (M&V) typically include a top-level group that is politically responsible for implementing the ceasefire as part of a broader peace process, a main administrative committee, and geographically based sub-committees, which coordinate formally with technical committees and formally or informally coordinate with community-based networks. The United Nations Department of Political and Peacebuilding Affairs (UNDPPA) views gender balance in all the committees as "essential for a credible and responsive M&V mechanism".

=== Third party and community roles ===
The involvement in M&V of individuals, organisations, or representatives of uninvolved states that are mutually accepted as uninvolved in the conflict can encourage transparency and accountability. UNDPPA argues that neutral third parties significantly increase the likelihood that an M&V mechanism is effective.

Women's groups and other civil society organisations can contribute to monitoring, verification and investigation components of an M&V mechanism. The involvement of these community groups in an M&V mechanism can also help to protect the community when violations occur.

=== Mission closure ===
An M&V mechanism needs procedures for suspension or closure, in particular if the armed conflict re-escalates. Disagreements exist over the 26 February 2022 disabling of the remote cameras of the OSCE Special Monitoring Mission to Ukraine, following the Russian invasion. While the cameras would have become ineffective within a few days, those few extra days of data would have provided documentary evidence on the early stages of the invasion.

== Examples ==
Historical M&V mechanisms implemented since World War II include the United Nations Military Observer Group in India and Pakistan (UNMOGIP) established in 1951 by UNSC Resolution 91; the Ceasefire Joint Military Committee for the 2005 Sudanese Comprehensive Peace Agreement; and the Joint Ceasefire Monitoring Committee for the 2015 Myanmar Nationwide Ceasefire Agreement.

== Analysis ==
In June 2004, Antonia Potter of the Centre for Humanitarian Dialogue argued that experience from ceasefire monitoring and verification missions suggested several factors likely to increase their success. She recommended planning for M&V rapidly, "even preced[ing] negotiations where possible"; assessing the real commitment of the parties in conflict to a peaceful resolution of the conflict and empathy with the points of view of the parties; the involvement of experts; flexibility of the mission; training of mission participants; information management; and planning relations with the media. Potter also argued that the clarity of the ceasefire agreement and procedures for monitoring and responding to human rights abuses were among the factors that are likely to affect the success of a mission.

The 2014–2022 OSCE Special Monitoring Mission to Ukraine (SMM) was a well-resourced civilian M&V mission that for many years was considered successful; the mission was closed after the February 2022 Russian invasion of Ukraine. Based on extensive interviews with mission participants and senior officials, researcher Aly Verjee found several weaknesses in the SMM: there was a lack of clarity in interpreting the SMM's mandate; the mandate forbid the SMM from attributing responsibility for ceasefire violations; and there was a lack of responses to violations.
