= United Nations Security Council Resolution 303 =

UN Security Council Resolution 303
- Flag of India
- Date: 6 December 1971
- Meeting no.: 1,608
- Code: S/RES/303 (Document)
- Subject: The Situation in the India/Pakistan Subcontinent
- Voting summary: 11 voted for; None voted against; 4 abstained
- Result: Adopted

Security Council composition
- Permanent members: China; France; Soviet Union; United Kingdom; United States
- Non-permanent members: Argentina; Belgium; Burundi; Italy; Japan; Nicaragua; Poland; Sierra Leone; Somalia; Syria

United Nations Security Council Resolution 303, adopted on December 6, 1971, after a lack of unanimity at the 1606th and 1607th meetings of the Council prevented it from exercising its primary responsibility, the Council decided to refer the question to the General Assembly.

Meetings at the Council were called following a deterioration in relations between India and Pakistan over a series of incidents, including Jammu and Kashmir, and the additional strife in East Pakistan. Additionally, the United Nations Military Observer Group in India and Pakistan reported violations on both sides of the Karachi Agreement of 1949.

The resolution was adopted by 11 votes to none, while France, the People's Republic of Poland, Soviet Union and United Kingdom abstained.

== See also ==
- Bangladesh Liberation War
- Kashmir conflict
- List of United Nations Security Council Resolutions 301 to 400 (1971–1976)
