= United Nations Security Council Resolution 211 =

UN Security Council Resolution 211
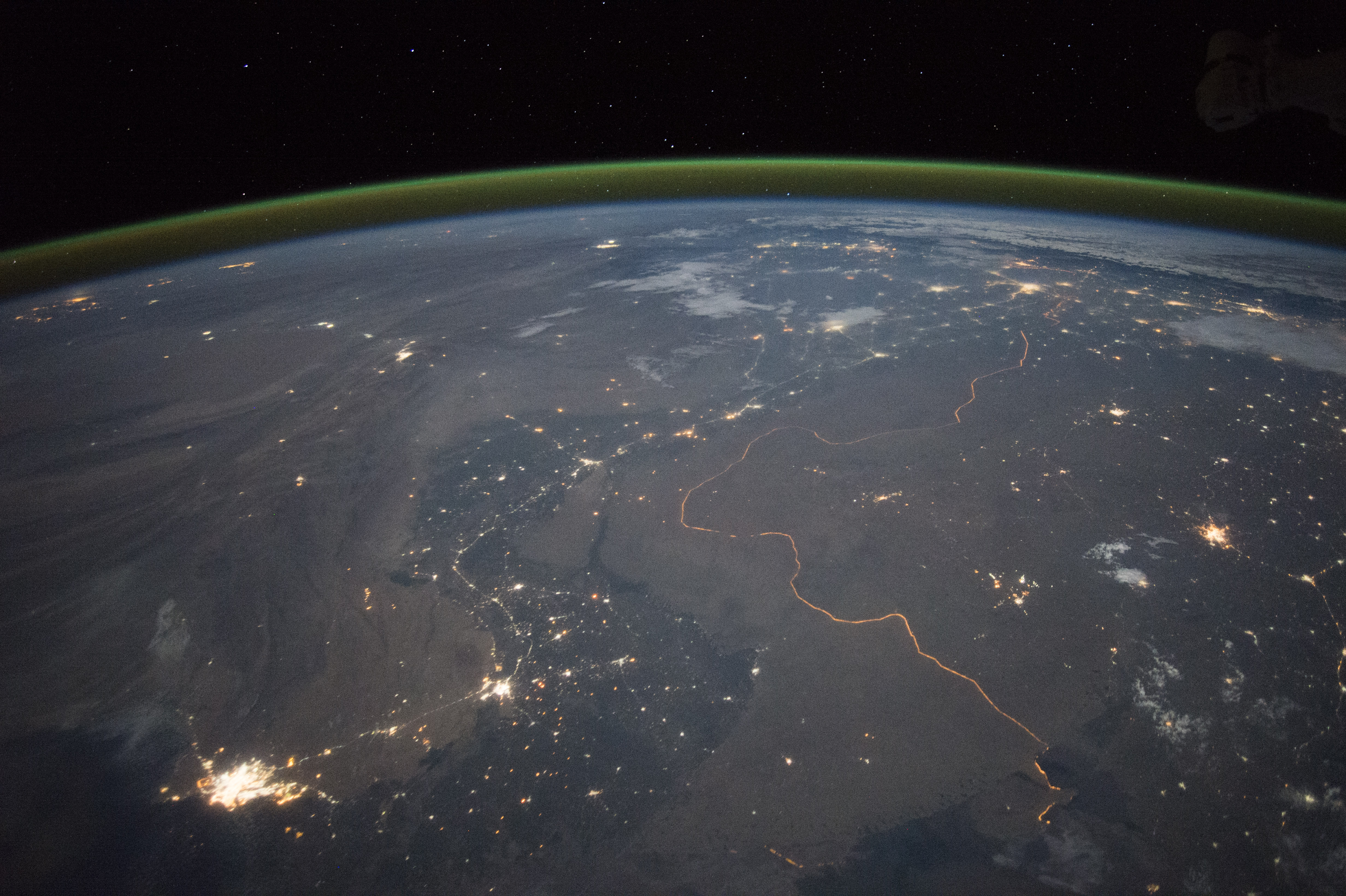
- India–Pakistan border
- Date: September 20 1965
- Meeting no.: 1242
- Subject: The India–Pakistan Question
- Voting summary: 10 voted for; None voted against; 1 abstained
- Result: Adopted

Security Council composition
- Permanent members: China; France; Soviet Union; United Kingdom; United States
- Non-permanent members: Bolivia; Ivory Coast; Jordan; Malaysia; Netherlands; Uruguay

United Nations Security Council Resolution 211 was adopted on September 20, 1965. After the calls for a cease-fire in resolutions 209 and 210 went unheeded, the Council demanded that a cease-fire take effect at 0700 hours GMT on September 22 and that both forces withdraw to the positions held before August 5. The Council requested the Secretary-General ensure the supervision of the cease-fire and called on all states to refrain from any action which might aggravate the situation. The Council also decided that as soon as a cease-fire could be reached it would consider what steps could be taken to assist towards a settlement of the political problem underlying the conflict.

The resolution was adopted by ten votes to none, with Jordan abstaining.

== See also ==
- Indo-Pakistani War of 1965
- Kashmir conflict
- List of United Nations Security Council Resolutions 201 to 300 (1965–1971)
