= United Nations Security Council Resolution 307 =

UN Security Council Resolution 307
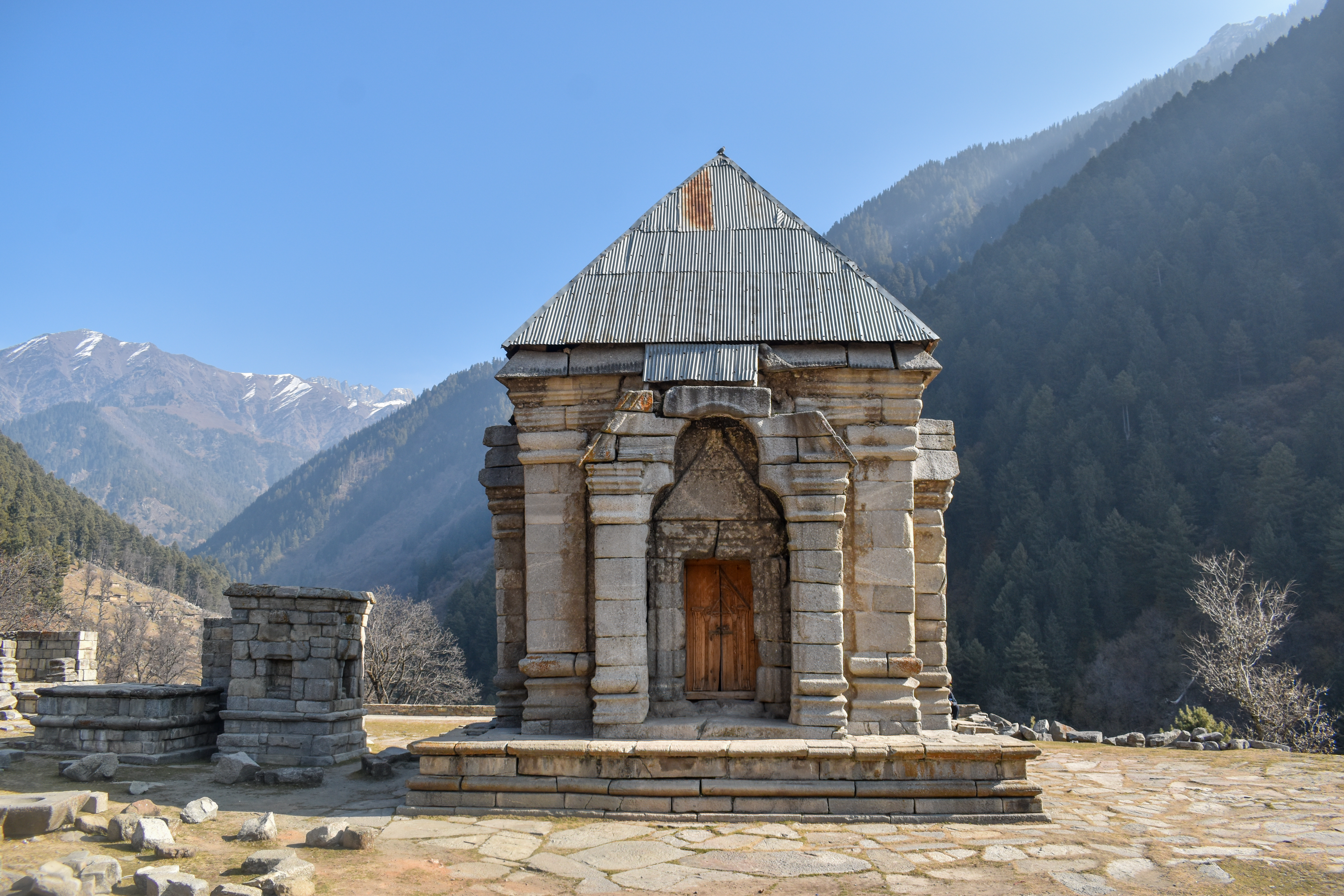
- Wangath Temple in Jammu and Kashmir
- Date: 21 December 1971
- Meeting no.: 1,621
- Code: S/RES/307 (Document)
- Subject: The situation in the India/Pakistan Subcontinent
- Voting summary: 13 voted for; None voted against; 2 abstained
- Result: Adopted

Security Council composition
- Permanent members: China; France; Soviet Union; United Kingdom; United States
- Non-permanent members: Argentina; Belgium; Burundi; Italy; Japan; Nicaragua; Poland; Sierra Leone; Somalia; Syria

United Nations Security Council Resolution 307, adopted on December 21, 1971, after hearing statements from India and Pakistan, the Council demanded that a durable cease-fire be observed until withdrawals could take place to respect the cease-fire line in Jammu and Kashmir. The council also called for international assistance in the relief of suffering and rehabilitation of refugees as well as their return home and a request for the Secretary-General to keep the council informed on developments.

The resolution was adopted by 13 votes to none; the People's Republic of Poland and Soviet Union abstained from the vote.
