= OHCHR reports on Kashmir =

United Nations reports on the human rights situation in Kashmir

Office of the United Nations High Commissioner for Human Rights (OHCHR) released two reports on "the situation of human rights in Indian-Administered Kashmir and Pakistan-Administered Kashmir". The first report released on 14 June 2018 was the first ever issued by the United Nations on human rights in Kashmir. The second update report was released on 8 July 2019. The first report covered June 2016 to April 2018 while the second report covered the period May 2018 to April 2019. In both cases the reactions of Pakistan and India were diametrically opposite.

== First report ==
The "Report on the Situation of Human Rights in Kashmir: Developments in the Indian State of Jammu and Kashmir from June 2016 to April 2018, and General Human Rights Concerns in Azad Jammu and Kashmir and Gilgit-Baltistan" was released on 14 June 2018. The first report was released under Zeid Ra’ad Al Hussein. The report was compiled through information already available in the public domain as the United Nations team was not given access to the region by either India or Pakistan.

Pakistan largely backed the report, especially the setting up of an international inquiry. In official communication Pakistan denied any equivalence with what was happening on both sides of the LoC the report also stated that “violations in this [Pakistani] area are of a different calibre or magnitude and of a more structural nature,” While in contrast the report detailed significant abuses in Indian-administered Kashmir which ranged from sexual violence, excessive use of force, torture and enforced disappearances. The Indian media also denied any similarity between what was happening on either side. India officially rejected the report calling it a violation of its "sovereignty and territorial integrity" as well as being a "selective compilation of largely unverified information" that was published with bias and prejudice. India's official spokesperson also claimed that entities such as "Azad Jammu and Kashmir" and "Gilgit-Baltistan" did not exist.

The report noted that Indian security forces have continued to carry out arbitrary arrests and detentions, torture, forced disappearances, and custodial killings of suspected militants and their alleged civilian sympathizers and generally enjoy impunity. In addition to this the report states that militants on both sides of the border engaged in intimidation and scare tactics and how pro-India advocates have been killed by militants on the Pakistan side.

== Second report ==
The "Update of the Situation of Human Rights in Indian-Administered Kashmir and Pakistan-Administered Kashmir from May 2018 to April 2019" was released on 8 July 2019. The second report was released under UN human rights head Michelle Bachelet.

The report criticized India's crowd control measures in the region stating that Indian security forces regularly used shotguns even though they are not used anywhere else in India, investigations into alleged extrajudicial killings and legal immunity for security forces. The report further criticized the "cordon and search operations” in 2017, which “enable a range of human rights violations, including physical intimidation and assault, invasion of privacy, arbitrary and unlawful detention, collective punishment and destruction of private property” by Indian security forces. The report also condemned the Armed Forces Special Powers Act stating that it remained a “key obstacle to accountability”.

The report mentioned that people in Gilgit-Baltistan were "deprived of a number of fundamental human rights", "members of nationalist and pro-independence political parties" as well as journalists faced political threats and harassment. Following the publication India called the report "a continuation of the earlier false and motivated narrative", and declined communication with any United Nations special rapporteurs on the reports.

China reacted to the two reports by saying that India and Pakistan should take no unilateral decision with relation to Kashmir; and that the human rights of Kashmiris should be respected.
