= L'Abidjanaise =

National anthem of Côte d'Ivoire

English: Song of Abidjan
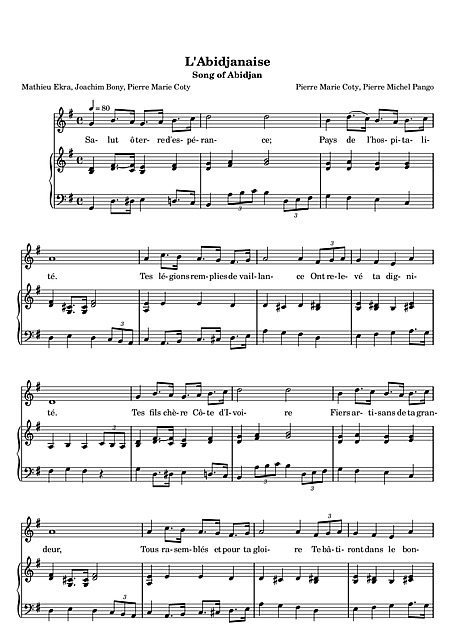
- National anthem of Côte d'Ivoire
- Lyrics: Pierre Marie Coty and Mathieu Ekra, 1959
- Music: Pierre-Michel Pango, 1959
- Adopted: 1960; 66 years ago

Audio sample
- L'Abidjanaise by United States Navy Band: file; help

"L'Abidjanaise" (English: "The Song of Abidjan") is the national anthem of Côte d'Ivoire, adopted under law number 60–207 on 27 July 1960. It takes the form of a lyric poem, expressing patriotism and values such as hope, peace, dignity, and "true brotherhood".

== History ==
The anthem performed on 12 October 1992 by the Ivorian Military Orchestra in front of President Felix Houphouët-Boigny before the inauguration of the armies museum

Adopted in 1960 at the country's independence, "L'Abidjanaise" remains the national anthem of Côte d'Ivoire, though the de jure capital is now Yamoussoukro, while Abidjan remains the economic capital and retains some political functions. This hymn is strongly tinged with patriotism and influenced by religion. The lyrics are from ministers Mathieu Vangah Ekra and Joachim Bony. The music was composed by abbots Pierre-Marie Coty and Pierre-Michel Pango, taking "La Marseillaise" as a model.

Between 2007 and 2009, under the leadership of Laurent Gbagbo, there was a proposal to replace "L'Abidjanaise" with a different song, "L'Ode à la Patrie" as the national anthem. This Ode was composed in 2002 after the start of the Ivorian civil war, and was selected by contest in 2003. "Ode à la Patrie" was sung by supporters of the now former head of state and broadcast on the RTI's television network instead of "L'Abidjanaise" until 2007, even though the latter remained, according to the constitution, the country's national anthem. However, the proposal was eventually dropped.

== Lyrics ==
French original (official)

I
Salut Ô terre d'espérance;
Pays de l'hospitalité.
Tes légions remplies de vaillance
Ont relevé ta dignité.

Tes fils, chère Côte d'Ivoire,
Fiers artisans de ta grandeur,
Tous rassemblés pour ta gloire (Note: Sometimes written Tous rassemblés et pour ta gloire ("All gathered together and for thy glory").)
Te bâtiront dans le bonheur.

Refrain I :
Fiers Ivoiriens, le pays nous appelle.
Si nous avons dans la paix ramené la liberté,
Notre devoir sera d'être un modèle
De l'espérance promise à l'humanité,
En forgeant, unis (Note: Occasionally written with the singular unie.) dans la foi nouvelle,
La patrie de la vraie fraternité.

II
À toi noble Côte d'Ivoire,
Ô grand pays des bonnes gens !
Nous apportons dans la victoire,
L’hommage de nos cœurs ardents.

Dans l’amitié des peuples frères,
Dieu guide nous vers l’idéal,
Soumise à la devise chère :
Union, discipline, travail.

Refrain II :
Pour ta grandeur, riche et noble patrie,
Nous marcherons de l’avant, pleins d’amour et pleins de foi.
De cœurs unis, au cours de notre vie,
Nous œuvrerons dans l’honneur pour le juste droit,
De cœurs unis au cours de notre vie,
À tes appels nous serons tous présents.

III
À tous nos compagnons de route,
À l’aube de ce jour tombés,
Pour que ne règne plus le doute,
Mais la foi, la fraternité.

À tous nos bataillons d’élite,
Dans la tombe aujourd’hui couchés,
Ô peuple tout entier redites :
Amour, honneur, fidélité.

Refrain I

IV
Et que ton drapeau nous unisse,
Que ton amour nous fortifie,
Car pour toi seul nous voulons vivre,
Et pour toi combattre et mourir.

Et vous, fière et noble jeunesse,
De tous les horizons connus,
Suivez toujours cette sagesse,
de nos ainés qui ne sont plus.

Refrain II

V
A nous qu’anime l’espérance,
En ton avenir lumineux,
Redonne toujours l’assurance,
De nous conduire en peuple heureux.

Et nous irons de par le monde,
Semer ton nom et tes bienfaits,
En clamant sur toutes les ondes,
Que sur ton sol règne la paix.

Refrain I

Nouchi lyrics (by Nash du Gbonhi)

I
Voici mon Gbô Dougou sans dégbahure
Glôki te tous les soutrays.
Tes kokas gbés de cracrahure
Ont reguigui ta djidjité.

Tes fris Gopios Côte d'Ivoire
Fans Djobeurs de ta Doungbahure
Tous en Gbonhi pour que tu Djafoule
Vont te Kpata dans l'Enjaillement.

Refrain I:
Fros Ivoiriens, le Glôki nous kpokpo Soyons Djawlys
Si nous Frayassons dans la Blêmou Toufassons le sans-Kaba
Notre wé est de Zier en Viémôgôni.
Sans se Dégba Panpandra à la Gbonhité
En magnérant foule dans la Siance Nikélé
Le Djassa de djidji Frêssanhité.

English translation

I
We salute you, O land of hope,
Country of hospitality;
Thy full gallant legions
Have restored thy dignity.

Beloved Ivory Coast, thy sons,
Proud builders of thy greatness,
All gathered together for thy glory,
In joy will we construct thee.

Chorus I:
Proud Ivorians, the country calls us.
If we have brought back liberty peacefully,
It will be our duty to be an example
Of the hope promised to humanity,
In building, united in the new faith
The homeland of true brotherhood.

II
To you, noble Ivory Coast,
O great country of good people!
We bring in victory,
The homage of our ardent hearts.

In the friendship of the brotherly peoples,
God guides us to the ideal,
Subject to the motto:
Union labor discipline.

Chorus II:
For your greatness, rich and noble homeland,
We will walk forward, full of love and full of faith.
From united hearts, during our life,
We will work in honor for the just right,
Of hearts united during our life,
With your calls we will all be present.

III
To all our fellow travelers,
At the dawn of this fallen day,
So that there is no longer any doubt,
But faith, fraternity.

To all our elite battalions,
In the tomb today,
O whole people repetitions:
Love, honor, fidelity.

Chorus I

IV
And let your flag unite us,
May your love strengthen us,
Because for you alone we want to live,
And for you fight and die.

And you, proud and noble youth,
From all known horizons,
Always follow this wisdom,
of our elders who are no more.

Chorus II

V
To us, which animates hope,
In your bright future,
Always restore the insurance,
To lead us into happy people.

And we will go around the world,
Sow your name and your benefits,
By clamoring on all the waves,
That on your soil reigns peace.

Chorus I
