= United Nations Security Council Resolution 209 =

UN Security Council Resolution 209
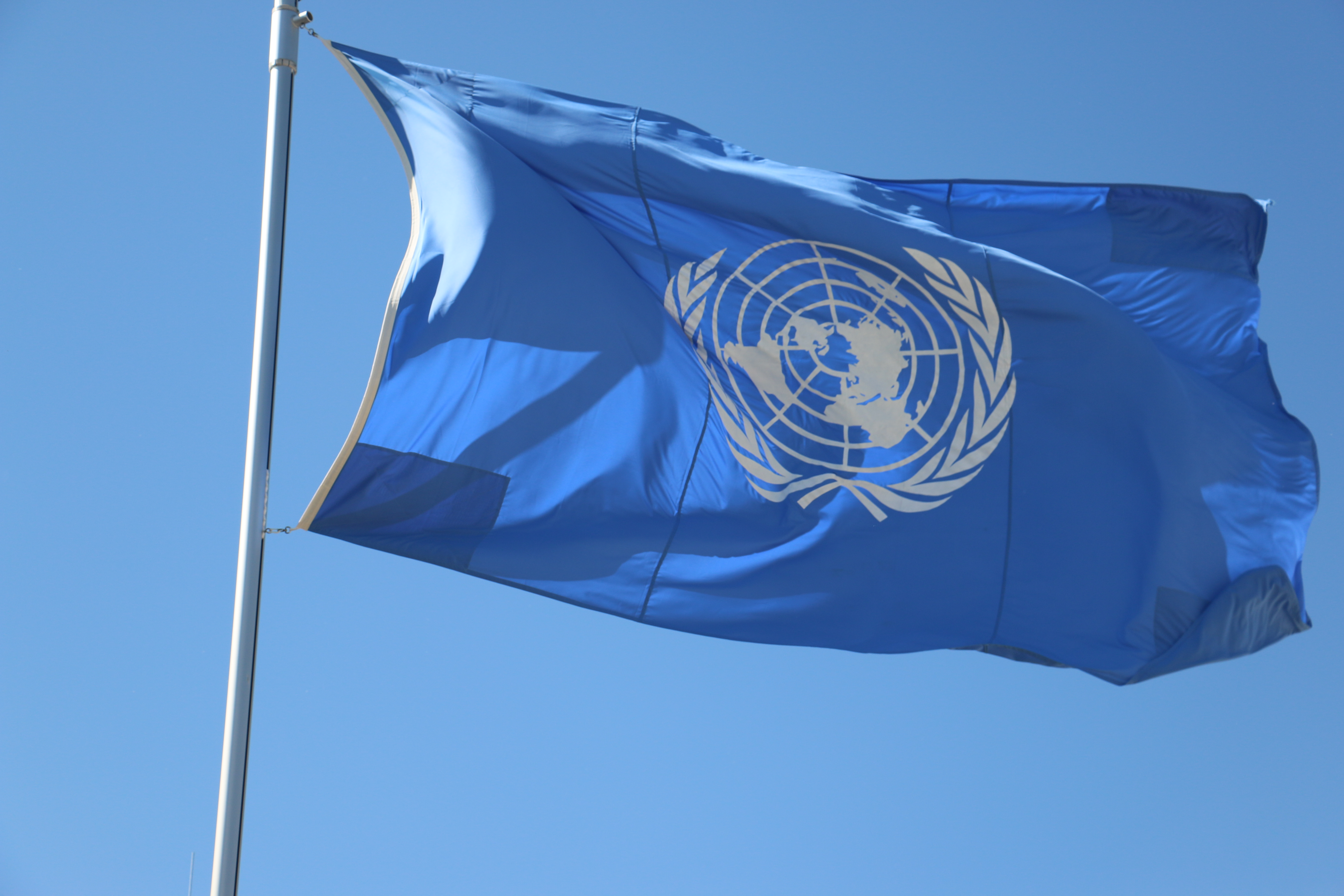
- UN flag
- Date: September 4 1965
- Meeting no.: 1237
- Subject: The India–Pakistan Question
- Voting summary: 11 voted for; None voted against; None abstained
- Result: Adopted

Security Council composition
- Permanent members: China; France; Soviet Union; United Kingdom; United States
- Non-permanent members: Bolivia; Ivory Coast; Jordan; Malaysia; Netherlands; Uruguay

United Nations Security Council Resolution 209, adopted on September 4, 1965, with a deteriorating situation along the cease-fire line in Kashmir, the Council called upon both India and Pakistan to take all steps necessary to immediately cease fighting and return to their respective sides of the line. The Council also called on the two governments to co-operate fully with the United Nations Military Observer Group in Pakistan and asked the Secretary-General to report back on the implementation of the resolution within three days.

The resolution was adopted unanimously.

== See also ==
- Indo-Pakistani War of 1965
- Kashmir conflict
- List of United Nations Security Council Resolutions 201 to 300 (1965–1971)
