= United Nations Security Council Resolution 210 =

UN Security Council Resolution 210
- UN emblem
- Date: September 6 1965
- Meeting no.: 1238
- Subject: The India–Pakistan Question
- Voting summary: 11 voted for; None voted against; None abstained
- Result: Adopted

Security Council composition
- Permanent members: China; France; Soviet Union; United Kingdom; United States
- Non-permanent members: Bolivia; Ivory Coast; Jordan; Malaysia; Netherlands; Uruguay

United Nations Security Council Resolution 210, adopted unanimously on September 6, 1965, after receiving a report by the Secretary-General on the developments in the situation in Kashmir, the Council called on the parties to cease hostilities in the entire area of conflict immediately and withdraw all armed personnel to the positions they held before August 5, 1965. The Council requested the Secretary General do all he possibly could to give effect to the present resolution and resolution 209 as well as strengthening the United Nations Military Observer Group in Pakistan. The Council then decided to keep the issue under urgent and continuous review.

== See also ==
- Indo-Pakistani War of 1965
- Kashmir conflict
- List of United Nations Security Council Resolutions 201 to 300 (1965–1971)
