= United Nations Security Council Resolution 123 =

UN Security Council Resolution 123
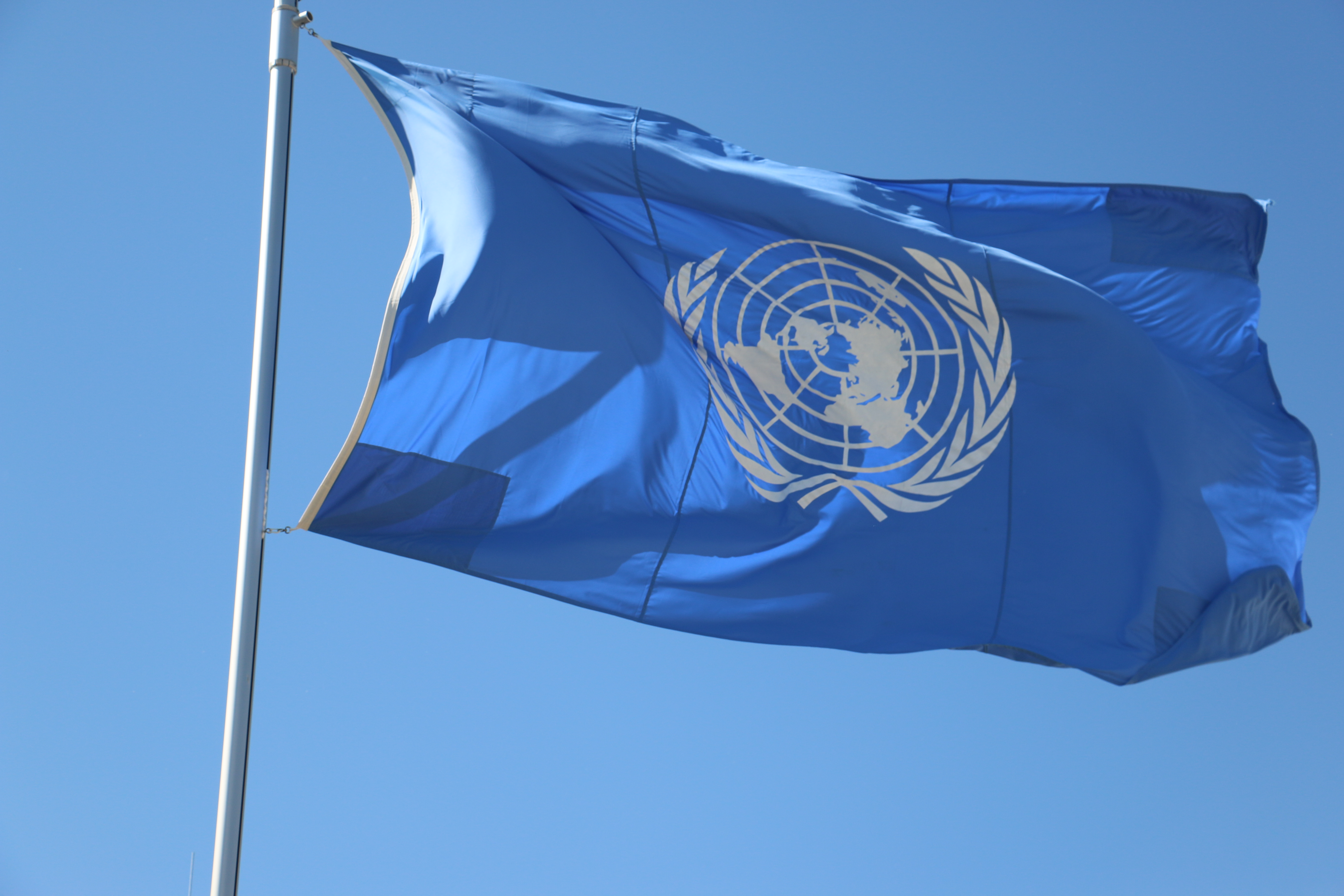
- UN flag
- Date: February 21 1957
- Meeting no.: 774
- Code: S/3793 (Document)
- Subject: The India–Pakistan Question
- Voting summary: 10 voted for; None voted against; 1 abstained
- Result: Adopted

Security Council composition
- Permanent members: China; France; Soviet Union; United Kingdom; United States
- Non-permanent members: Australia; Colombia; Cuba; Iraq; Philippines; Sweden

United Nations Security Council Resolution 123 was adopted on February 21, 1957, after the conflict over Jammu and Kashmir intensified. The council requested that the President of the Security Council visit the subcontinent and, along with the governments of India and Pakistan, examine any proposals which were likely to contribute to the resolution of the dispute. The council requested that he report back to them no later than April 15, and the resulting report formed the basis of United Nations Security Council Resolution 126, which was adopted in December of the same year.

The resolution was adopted by ten votes to none; the Soviet Union abstained.

== See also ==
- Kashmir conflict
- United Nations Security Council resolution
- List of United Nations Security Council Resolutions 101 to 200 (1953–1965)
