= United Nations Security Council Resolution 126 =

1957 UNSC resolution on the Kashmir conflict

UN Security Council Resolution 126
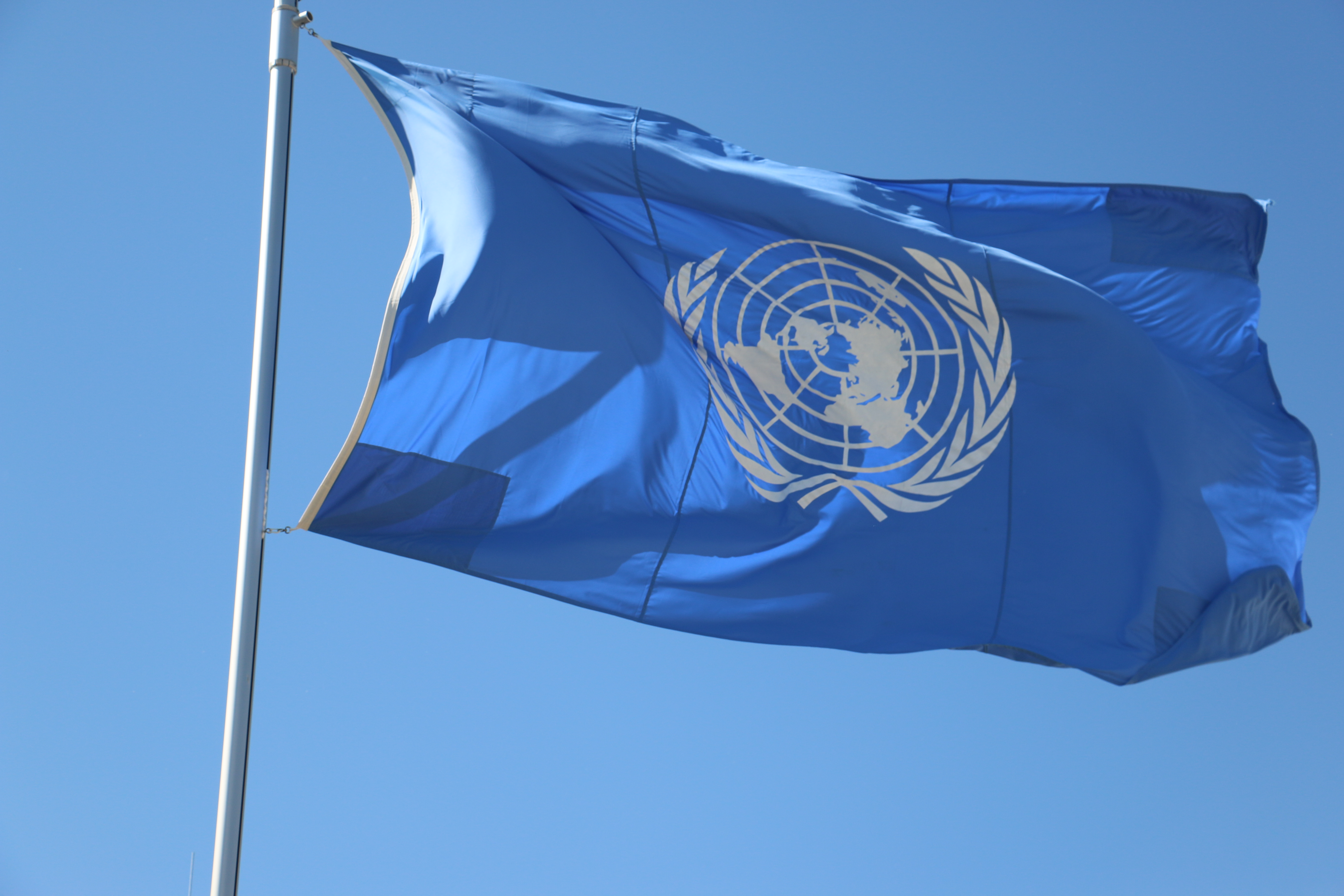
- UN flag
- Date: December 2 1957
- Meeting no.: 808
- Code: S/3922 (Document)
- Subject: The India–Pakistan Question
- Voting summary: 10 voted for; None voted against; 1 abstained
- Result: Adopted

Security Council composition
- Permanent members: China; France; Soviet Union; United Kingdom; United States
- Non-permanent members: Australia; Colombia; Cuba; Iraq; Philippines; Sweden

United Nations Security Council Resolution 126 was adopted on 2 December 1957. It was the last of three resolutions passed during 1957 to deal with the dispute between the governments of India and Pakistan over the territories of Jammu and Kashmir. It followed a report on the situation by Gunnar Jarring, representative for Sweden which the council had requested in resolution 123. It requests that the governments of India and Pakistan refrain from aggravating the situation, and instructs the United Nations Representative for India and Pakistan to visit the subcontinent and report to the council with recommended action toward further progress.

The resolution was passed by ten votes to one, with the Soviet Union abstaining.

== See also ==
- Kashmir conflict
- List of United Nations Security Council Resolutions 101 to 200 (1953–1965)
