= United Nations Security Council Resolution 96 =

UN Security Council Resolution 96
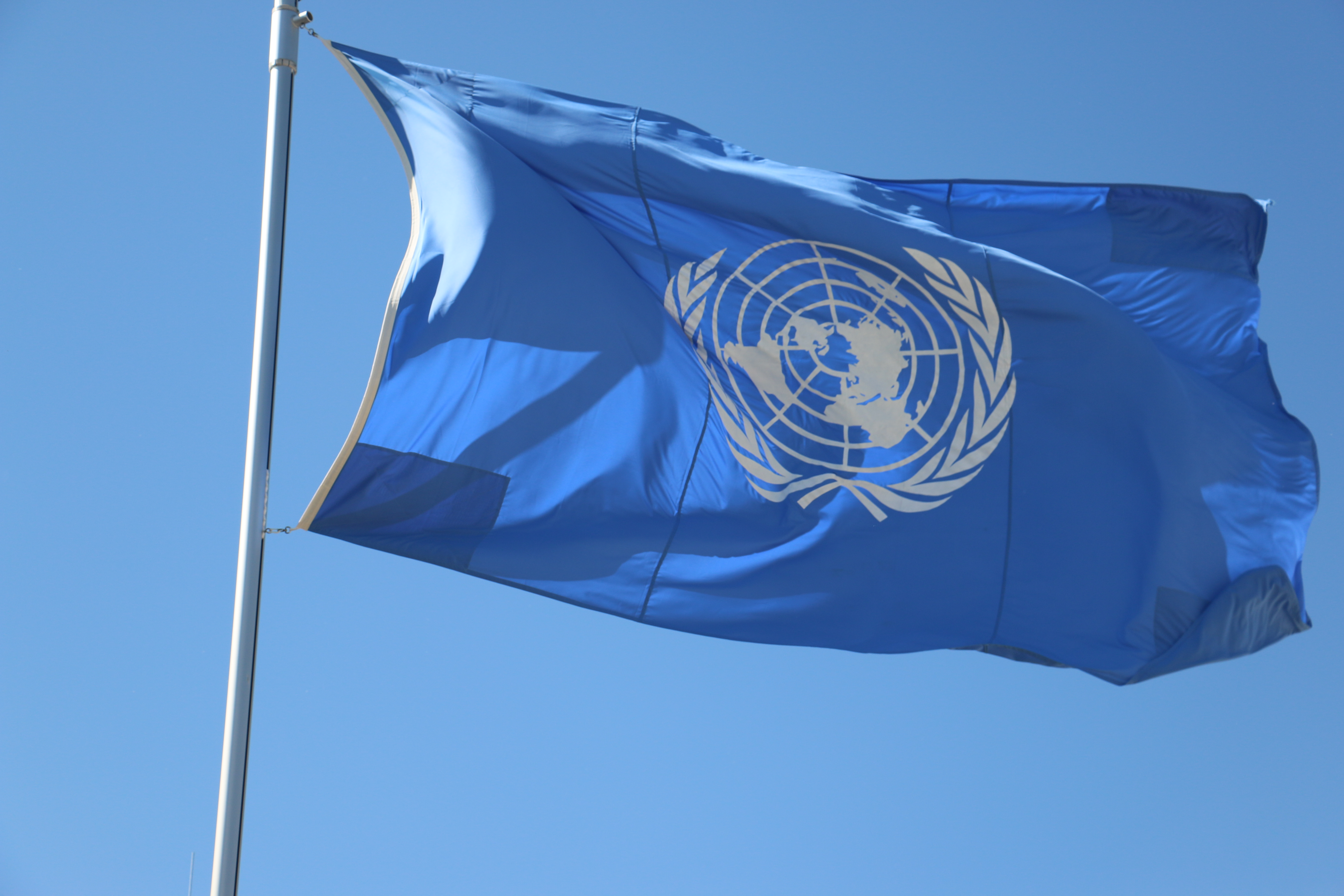
- UN flag
- Date: November 10 1951
- Meeting no.: 566
- Code: S/2392 (Document)
- Subject: The India–Pakistan Question
- Voting summary: 9 voted for; None voted against; 2 abstained
- Result: Adopted

Security Council composition
- Permanent members: China; France; Soviet Union; United Kingdom; United States
- Non-permanent members: Brazil; Ecuador; India; Netherlands; Turkey; Yugoslavia

United Nations Security Council Resolution 96, adopted on November 10, 1951, having received a report by Mr. Frank Graham, the United Nations representative for India and Pakistan, as well as hearing his speech before the Council a basis for a program of demilitarization was noted with approval. The Council noted with gratification the declaration by both India and Pakistan that they would work for a peaceful settlement, continue to observe a cease-fire and accepted the principle that the accession of the State of Jammu and Kashmir should be determined by a free and impartial plebiscite under the auspices of the United Nations. The Council then instructed the UN Representative to continue in his efforts to obtain agreement of the parties on a plan for effecting the demilitarization of the State of Jammu and Kashmir and to report back on his efforts together with his view concerning the problems confided to him within six weeks.

The resolution was adopted by nine votes to none; India and the Soviet Union abstained.

== See also ==
- List of United Nations Security Council Resolutions 1 to 100 (1946–1953)
