= United Nations Security Council Resolution 91 =

UN Security Council Resolution 91
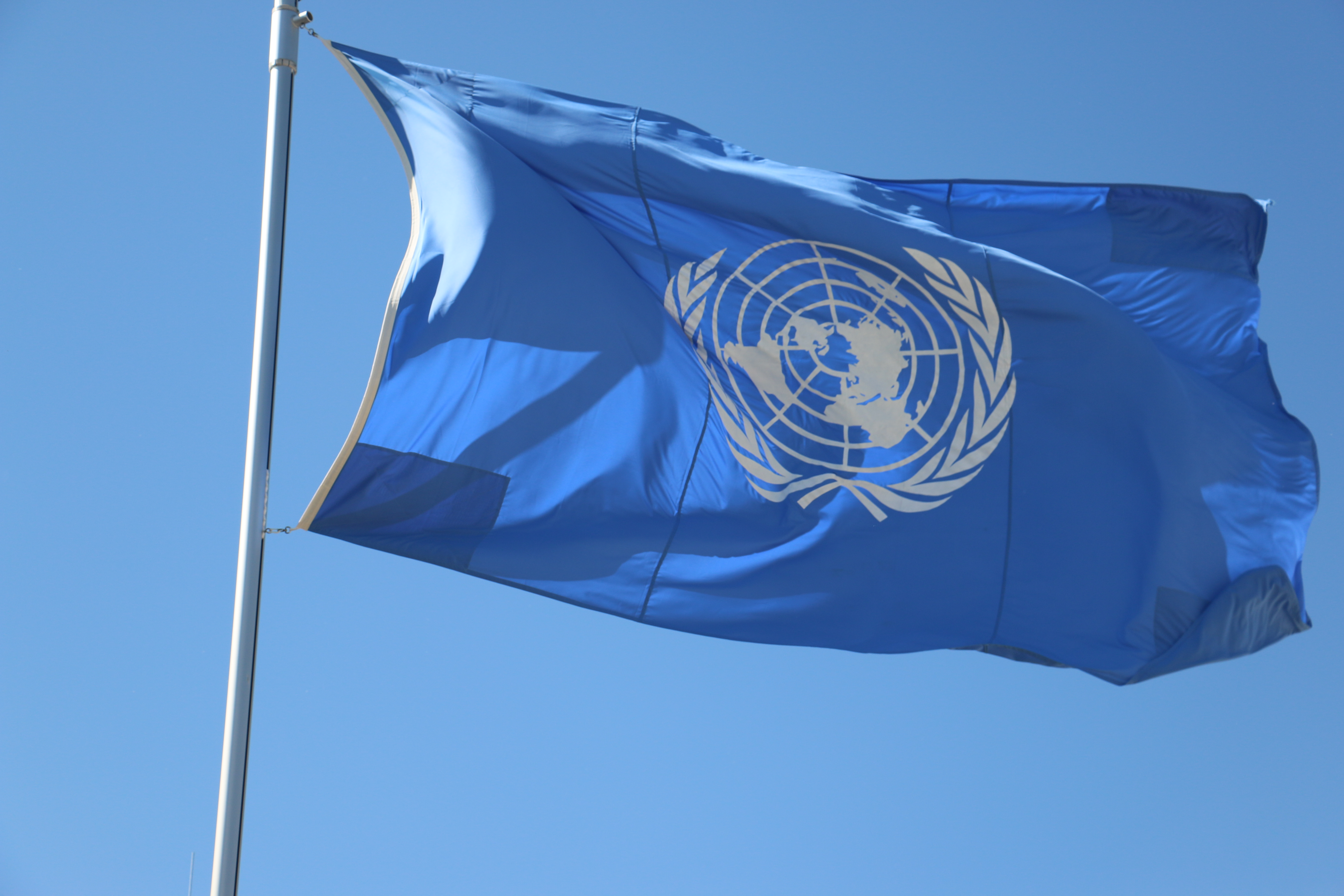
- UN flag
- Date: March 30 1951
- Meeting no.: 539
- Code: S/2017/Rev.1 (Document)
- Subject: The India–Pakistan Question
- Voting summary: 8 voted for; None voted against; 3 abstained
- Result: Adopted

Security Council composition
- Permanent members: China; France; Soviet Union; United Kingdom; United States
- Non-permanent members: Brazil; Ecuador; India; Netherlands; Turkey; Yugoslavia

United Nations Security Council Resolution 91, adopted on March 30, 1951, noting a report by Sir Owen Dixon, the United Nations Representative for India and Pakistan, stating that the main point of difference of preparing the state of Jammu and Kashmir for the holding of a plebiscite were as follows; the procedure for and extent of demilitarization, the degree of control over the exercise of the functions of government necessary to ensure a free and fair plebiscite.

The Council accepted Sir Dixon’s resignation and expressed its gratitude to him for his great ability and devotion. The Council then instructed Sir Dixon’s replacement to proceed to the subcontinent and, after consultation with the governments of India and Pakistan, to effect the demilitarization of the State of Jammu and Kashmir on the basis of the United Nations Commission for India and Pakistan and called upon the parties to co-operate with the UN Representative to the fullest degree in effecting the demilitarization.

The Council then instructed the new UN Representative to report to them within three months and, if he had not effected the demilitarization or obtained plans to do so, the Representative would report to the Council those points of difference which would have to be resolved for demilitarization to be carried out. The Council then called upon the parties to accept arbitration upon all outstanding points of difference, should the UN Representative fail to achieve a full agreement, by an arbiter or a panel of arbiters to be appointed by the president of the International Court of Justice. It was also decided that the Military Observer Group would continue to supervise the cease-fire in the state.

The resolution was adopted eight votes to none, with three abstentions from India, the Soviet Union and Yugoslavia.

== See also ==
- List of United Nations Security Council Resolutions 1 to 100 (1946–1953)
