= History of Ivory Coast (1960–1999) =

Ivory Coast is a member state within the French Community

First Republic of Ivory Coast
- 1960–1999
- Flag Coat of arms
- Motto: 'Union – Discipline – Travail' (French) 'Unity – Discipline – Work'
- Anthem: L'Abidjanaise (English: "Song of Abidjan")
- Capital: Abidjan (1960-1983); Yamoussoukro (1983-1999)
- Government: Unitary presidential republic; under a one-party state (1960-1990)
- President
  - 1960-1993: Félix Houphouët-Boigny
  - 1993-1999: Henri Konan Bédié
- Prime minister
  - 1960: Félix Houphouët-Boigny
  - 1990-1993: Alassane Ouattara
  - 1993-1999: Daniel Kablan Duncan
- Legislature: Parliament of Ivory Coast
- Historical era: Decolonisation of Africa, Cold War, post-Cold War
  - Independence of France: 7 August 1960
  - Return to multipartyism: 1990
  - Death of Boigny: 7 December 1993
  - 1999 Ivorian coup d'état: 24 December 1999
- Currency: West African CFA franc (XOF)
- ISO 3166 code: CI
Preceded by	Succeeded by
Colony of Côte d'Ivoire	Côte d'Ivoire

On December 4, 1958, Ivory Coast became a member state within the French Community. On August 7, 1960, Ivory Coast achieved its full independence from France, and Félix Houphouët-Boigny became the first president after the independence.

== Student activism in the 1960s-70s ==
Students in the 1960s and 1970s began to organise into student activist groups, some of which opposed the Houphouet-Boigny regime.

In 1969, the regime helped found the Students and Pupils Movement of Côte d'Ivoire (French: Mouvement des Etudiants et Elèves de Côte d'Ivoire or MEECI), an organization of students and pupils. MEECI was closely associated to the regime from the start. Its founding congress was held in the Democratic Party of Côte d'Ivoire (PDCI) office in Abidjan from April 3–5, 1969. Tanoh Brou Antoine (later Minister of Environment) was elected president of the executive committee.

The formation of MEECI provoked protests amongst students, as the group was known to provide surveillance to the PCDI. In 1971, students at the University of Abidjan founded the politically independent Pupils and Students Trade Union of Côte d'Ivoire (French: Union Syndicale des Elèves et Etudiants de Côte d'Ivoire or USEEECI) in protest of MEECI. The new movement was immediately suppressed by the regime. Its leaders were imprisoned at the military camp at Séguéla for seven months. The government forced students to pledge that they would not engage in anti-government activism in order to remain in university.

== Houphouët-Boigny regime ==
Compared with the post-colonial leaders of other African countries, the policies of Félix Houphouët-Boigny were pro-Western. Houphouët-Boigny maintained a closed political allegiance to the West while many other leaders turned towards communism. After independence, Houphouët-Boigny maintained a close relation with France. Ivory Coast had a growing French expatriate community, and many of the French expatriates provided Ivory Coast technical assistance. Besides in economic issues, cooperation with France was also established in military issues. Houphouët-Boigny considered the permanent presence of French force as a protection which guaranteed the security of the country.

Houphouët-Boigny maintained a one-party regime. However, he often employed softer and less direct tactics to maintain his power and dictatorship. He would win over his political opponents by bringing them into the ruling party, giving compromises, offering cooperation, etc. However, every political party was banned except his own PDCI. Houphouët-Boigny won every presidential elections since the independence to his death in 1993.

Under his government, Ivory Coast took the course of liberal free market economy and expanded its cash crop sector. It became one of the largest producers of coffee and cocoa in the world. In 1955, Caisse de Stabilisation et de Soutien des Prix Agricoles (CAISTAB) was founded to control the prices of coffee and cocoa. By the early 1980s Ivory Coast had one of the highest per capita incomes among those Sub-Saharan states without petroleum. This was termed the Ivorian miracle.

However, in the 1980s, the prices of coffee and cocoa plunged. Equipped with a price stability fund, the government pledged to pay the price difference if farmers did not get enough prices at market for their products. However, the prices continued to drop, the fund quickly dried, subsidies to farmers had to be cut, and the external debt of Ivory Coast rose. As revenues fell, the government was forced to adjust its expense. The government funding was cut in many areas, particularly in education. Protests led by civil servants and students forced the government to hold elections and adopt a multi-party system in 1990.

The two major political parties in the 1990 election were the Ivorian Popular Front (FPI), founded by Laurent Gbagbo, and the ruling PDCI. Houphouët-Boigny won the first multi-party presidential election in 1990, with more than 80 percent of the vote. However, he died soon afterwards in 1993.

== Bédié ==
Henri Konan Bédié succeeded Houphouët-Boigny as the president. The economic situation was still unstable. Bédié was accused of corruption, political repression. He adopted nationalist and xenophobic policies such as "Ivoirité", which disfavored many people with immigrant background. The tension within Ivory Coast kept growing. On December 23, 1999, a group of soldiers rebelled. Bédié was overthrown in the coup d'état of the following day.

== Sources ==
- http://fieldsupport.dliflc.edu/products/cip/Cote_dIvoire/Cote_dIvorie.pdf
- http://digitalcommons.iwu.edu/cgi/viewcontent.cgi?article=1041&context=polisci_honproj&sei-redir=1#search=%22houphouet-boigny%20democratization%22
- http://www.oecd.org/dataoecd/51/11/39596493.pdf
