= History of East Pakistan =

History of Bangladesh, 1947–1971

The history of East Bengal and East Pakistan from 1947 to 1971 covers the period of Bangladesh's history from its incorporation into Pakistan following the end of British colonial rule in 1947 to its independence from Pakistan in 1971.

== 1947–56: dominion era ==
=== Post-partition difficulties ===
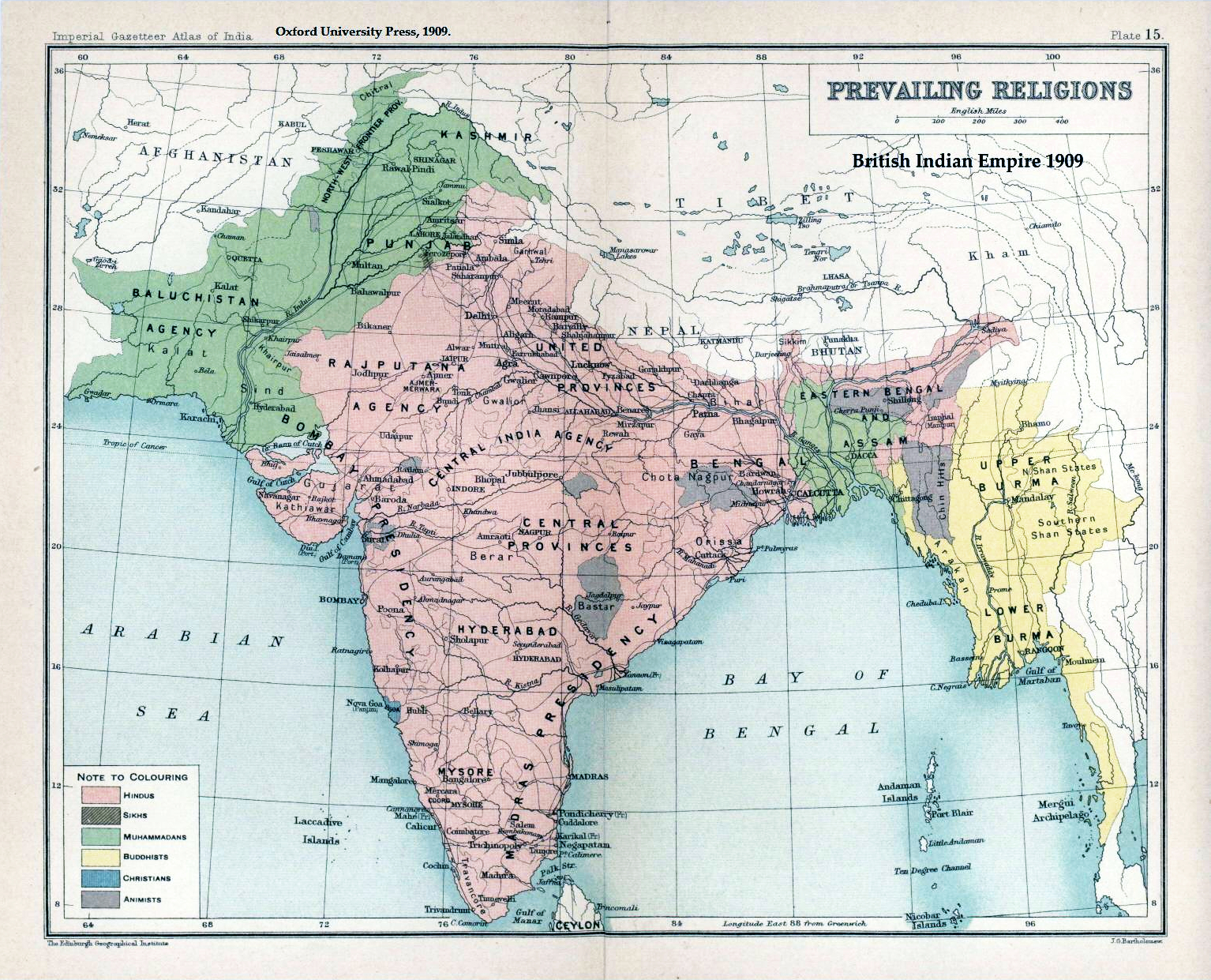
Distribution of some main religious groups in British Indian Empire, where majority of the Muslim population (green) concentrated in the western frontier part and eastern Bengali part of the empire. This was the basis which the state of Pakistan was formed in 1947.

East Pakistan was the lone province in Pakistan where most of the Hindu minority was concentrated, where they constituted 25% of the population. 12 out of the 14 Hindu members of Pakistan's Constituent Assembly came from East Bengal. However, the 1950 East Bengal riots, often classified as a genocide, and the deliberate inactions of the new Governor General Khwaja Nazimuddin and Chief Minister Nurul Amin in quelling the riots, caused most of the Hindus of East Pakistan to migrate to India. The deadly anti-Hindu violence caused all 34 Hindu members of the East Bengal Legislative Assembly and 12 Hindu members of the Constituent Assembly to abandon their positions and migrate to India, with notable figures like Jogendranath Mandal, the Law Minister appointed by Jinnah, being among them. A peasant revolt also occurred in Rajshahi but was quickly suppressed.

=== Bengali language movement ===
One of the most divisive issues confronting Pakistan in its infancy was the question of what the official language of the new state was to be. Muhammad Ali Jinnah yielded to the demands of refugees from the Indian states of Bihar and Uttar Pradesh, who insisted that Urdu be Pakistan's official language, as the language's central role in assertion of Muslim identity had been solidified since the Hindi-Urdu controversy. Speakers of the languages of West Pakistan (Punjabi, Sindhi, Pashto, and Baluchi) were upset that their languages were given second-class status. In East Pakistan, the dissatisfaction quickly turned to violence. The Bengalis of East Pakistan constituted a majority (an estimated 54%) of Pakistan's entire population. Their language, Bengali, like Urdu, belongs to the Indo-Aryan language family, but the two languages have different scripts (Bengali being written in the Brahmic Bengali-Assamese script while Urdu using the Perso-Arabic Nastaliq script) and literary traditions. The unpopular proposal of Education Minister Fazlur Rahman of writing Bengali in the Nastaliq script as a compromise was seen as a step of Islamisation by the East Bengali masses. Nevertheless, adult education centres were opened in East Pakistan to train Bengalis into learning their mother tongue devoid of Sanskrit loanwords (which were condemned as kafir influence) and written in Nastaliq script.

Jinnah visited East Pakistan on only one occasion after independence, shortly before his death in 1948. Speaking in Dhaka to a throng of over 300,000 on March 21, 1948, he announced that, "Without one state language, no nation can remain tied up solidly together and function". Jinnah's views were not accepted by most East Pakistanis.

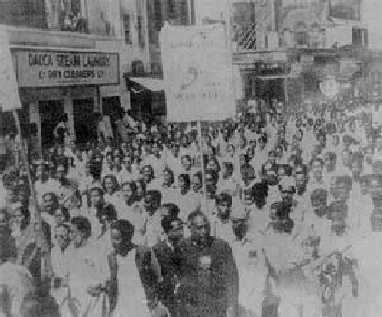
Demonstrations in 21 February 1952 in Dacca for the honour of state language for Bengali

On 27 January 1952, Khwaja Nazimuddin unilaterally declared on his speech at Dhaka's Paltan Maidan that the government of Pakistan had decided to make Urdu as the sole national language and that in future the government would encourage the imposition of the Nastaliq script for writing Bengali. The speech, although delivered in Bengali, was reportedly written in the Nastaliq script, since Nazimuddin, being a scion of the Dhaka's Nawab family, couldn't read, write or speak Bengali. All of Nazimuddin's close confidants like the Chief Minister Nurul Amin, East Pakistan Muslim League general secretary Yusuf Ali Chowdhury and Chief Secretary Aziz Ahmed were shocked at this declaration. This sparked of widespread demonstrations in East Bengal. On February 21, 1952, a demonstration was carried out in Dhaka in which students demanded equal status for Bengali. The police reacted by firing on the crowd and killing many students, most of whom remain unidentified to this day (a memorial, the Shaheed Minar, was built later to commemorate the martyrs of the language movement). Two years after the incident, Bengali agitation effectively forced the National Assembly to designate "Urdu and Bengali and such other languages as may be declared" to be the official languages of Pakistan.

=== Political issues ===
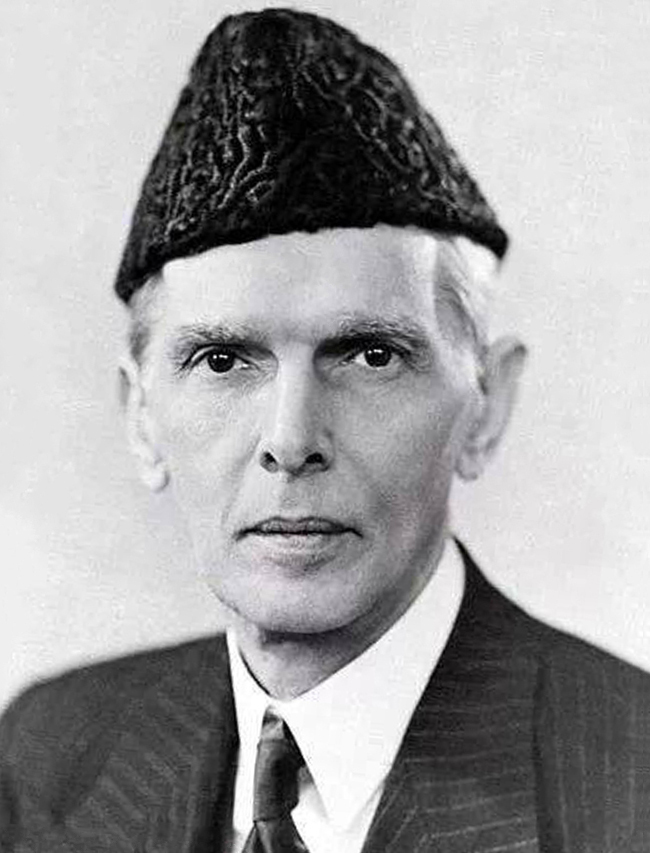
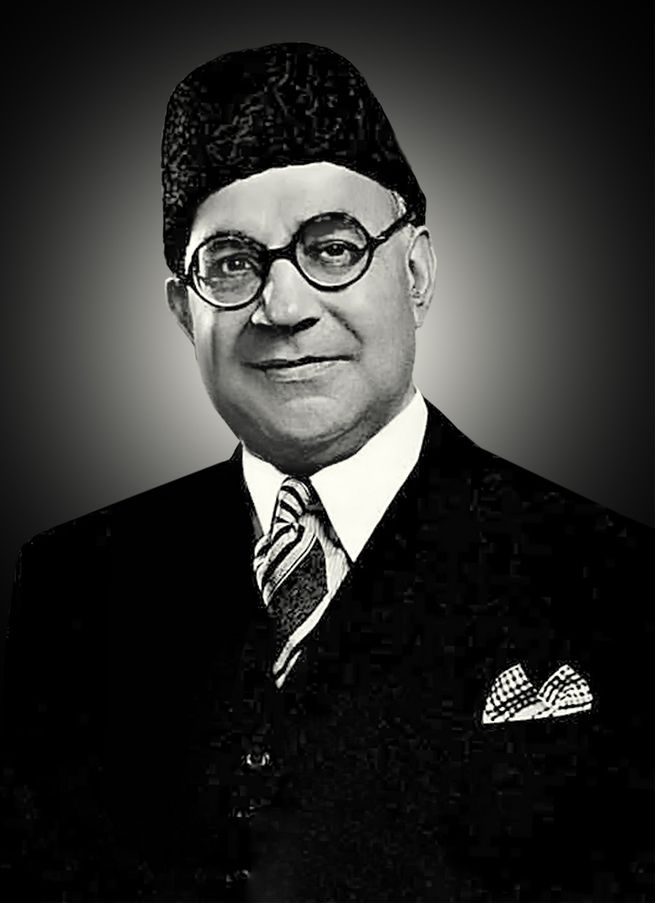
Muhammad Ali Jinnah (left) and Liaquat Ali Khan (right)

What kept the new country together was the vision and forceful personality of the founders of Pakistan: Jinnah, the governor general popularly known as the Quaid i Azam (Supreme Leader); and Liaquat Ali Khan (1895–1951), the first prime minister, popularly known as the Quaid i Millet (Leader of the Community). The government machinery established at independence was similar to the viceregal system that had prevailed in the pre-independence period and placed no formal limitations on Jinnah's constitutional powers. In the 1970s in Bangladesh Sheikh Mujibur Rahman, the leader of the independence movement of Bangladesh from Pakistan, would enjoy much of the same prestige and exemption from the normal rule of law. Sheikh Mujibur Rahman has often been criticised in many quarters of being autocratic.

When Jinnah died in September 1948, the seat of power shifted from the governor general to the prime minister, Liaquat. Liaquat had extensive experience in politics and enjoyed as a refugee from India the additional benefit of not being too closely identified with any one province of Pakistan. A moderate, Liaquat subscribed to the ideals of a parliamentary, democratic, and secular state. Out of necessity he considered the wishes of the country's premier religious spokesman, Syed Abul Ala Maududi, Amir of the Jamaat-e-Islami who championed the cause of Pakistan as an Islamic state. He was seeking a balance of Islam against secularism for a new constitution when he was assassinated on October 16, 1951, by fanatics opposed to Liaquat's refusal to wage war against India. With both Jinnah and Liaquat gone, Pakistan faced an unstable period that would be resolved by military and civil service intervention in political affairs. The first few turbulent years after independence thus defined the enduring politico-military culture of Pakistan.

The inability of the politicians to provide a stable government was largely a result of their mutual suspicions. Loyalties tended to be personal, ethnic, and provincial rather than national and issue oriented. Provincialism was openly expressed in the deliberations of the Constituent Assembly. In the Constituent Assembly, frequent arguments voiced the fear that the West Pakistani province of Punjab would dominate the nation. An ineffective body, the Constituent Assembly took almost nine years to draft a constitution, which for all practical purposes was never put into effect.

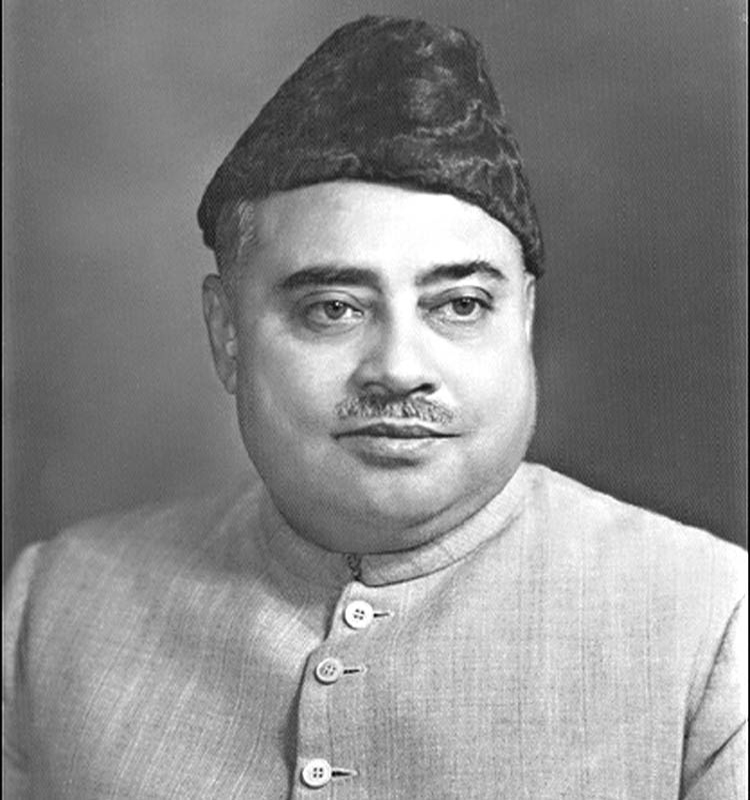
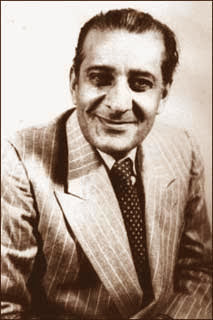
Khawaja Nazimuddin (left) and Ghulam Mohammad (right)

Liaquat was succeeded as prime minister by a conservative Bengali, Governor General Khwaja Nazimuddin. Former finance minister Ghulam Mohammad, a Punjabi career civil servant, became governor general. Ghulam Mohammad was dissatisfied with Nazimuddin's inability to deal with Bengali agitation for provincial autonomy and worked to expand his own power base. East Pakistan favored a high degree of autonomy, with the central government controlling little more than foreign affairs, defense, communications, and currency. In 1953, Ghulam Mohammad dismissed Prime Minister Nazimuddin, established martial law in Punjab, and imposed governor's rule (direct rule by the central government) in East Pakistan. In 1954, he appointed his own "cabinet of talents". Mohammad Ali Bogra, another conservative Bengali and previously Pakistan's ambassador to the United States and the United Nations, was named prime minister.

During September and October 1954 a chain of events culminated in a confrontation between the governor general and the prime minister. Prime Minister Bogra tried to limit the powers of Governor General Ghulam Mohammad through hastily adopted amendments to the de facto constitution, the Government of India Act of 1935. The governor general, however, enlisted the tacit support of the army and civil service, dissolved the Constituent Assembly, and then formed a new cabinet. Bogra, a man without a personal following, remained prime minister but without effective power. General Iskander Mirza, who had been a soldier and civil servant, became minister of the interior; General Muhammad Ayub Khan, the army commander, became minister of defence; and Chaudhry Muhammad Ali, former head of the civil service, remained minister of finance. The main objective of the new government was to end disruptive provincial politics and to provide the country with a new constitution. The Federal Court, however, declared that a new Constituent Assembly must be called. Ghulam Mohammad was unable to circumvent the order, and the new Constituent Assembly, elected by the provincial assemblies, met for the first time in July 1955. Bogra, who had little support in the new assembly, fell in August and was replaced by Choudhry; Ghulam Mohammad, plagued by poor health, was succeeded as governor general in September 1955 by Mirza.

=== United Front cabinet in East Bengal ===
Legislative election held from March 8 to 12, 1954, the United Front, a political coalition anchored by A. K. Fazlul Huq's Krishak Sramik Samajbadi Dal (Peasants and Workers Socialist Party) and the Awami League (People's League) led by Huseyn Shaheed Suhrawardy, won 223 out of 237 Muslim seats (total 309 seats) in East Bengal Legislative Assembly.

The Muslim League had been overwhelmingly defeated in the 1954 provincial assembly elections by the United Front. Rejection of West Pakistan's dominance over East Pakistan and the desire for Bengali provincial autonomy were the main ingredients of the coalition's twenty-one-point platform.

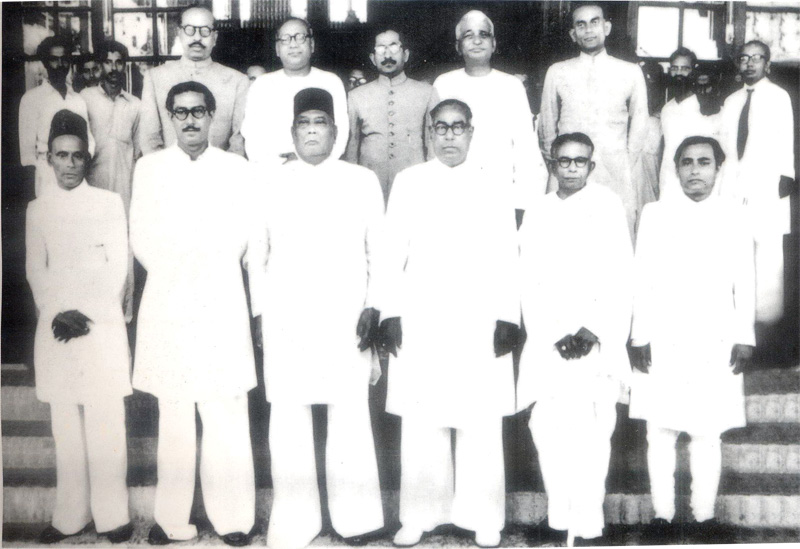
The 1954 East Bengal cabinet formed by the United Front

On April 3, 1954, Sher-e-Bangla A. K. Fazlul Huq formed a four-member United Front cabinet. The full cabinet was formed on 15 May. Huq took over as the Chief Minister of the province. But on 30 May 1954 the governor-general of Pakistan Ghulam Mohammad dismissed the United Front government, upon of accusations against A. K. Fazlul Huq of attempting secession.

The East Pakistani election and the coalition's victory proved pyrrhic; Bengali factionalism surfaced soon after the election and the United Front fell apart. From 1954 to Ayub's assumption of power in 1958, the Krishak Sramik and the Awami League waged a ceaseless battle for control of East Pakistan's provincial government.

== 1956–66 ==
=== 1956: Constitution ===
Prime Minister Choudhry induced the politicians to agree on a constitution in 1956. In order to establish a better balance between the west and east wings, the four provinces of West Pakistan were amalgamated into one administrative unit. The 1956 constitution made provisions for an Islamic state as embodied in its Directive of Principles of State Policy, which defined methods of promoting Islamic morality. The national parliament was to comprise one house of 300 members with equal representation from both the west and east wings.

=== 1956–1957: Suhrawardy's premiership ===
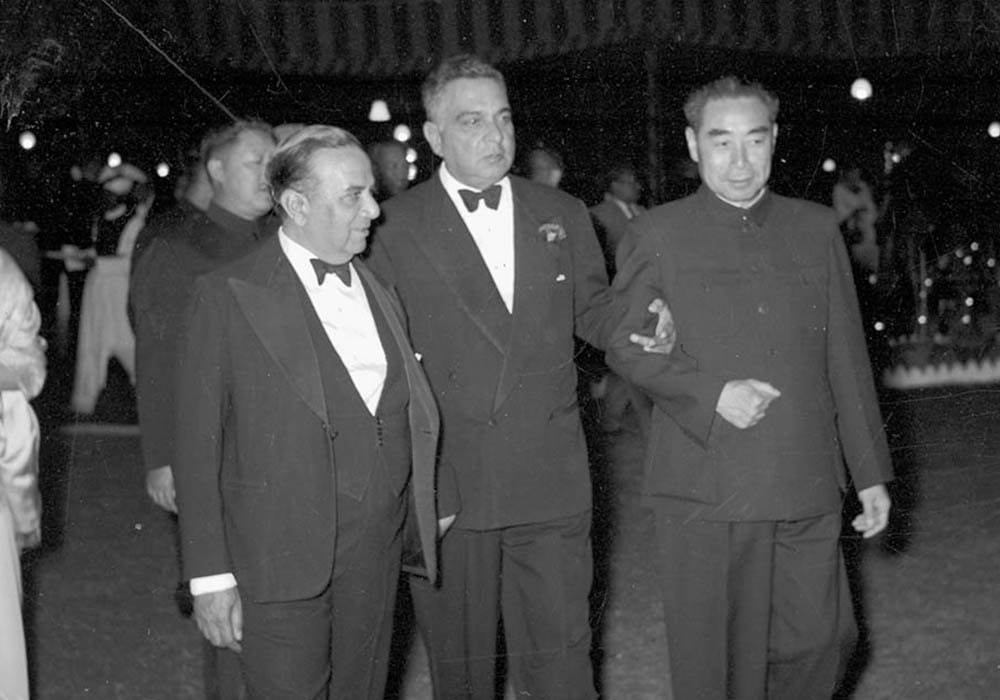
Suhrawardy (left) with president Iskander Mirza (middle) and Chinese premier Zhou Enlai (right)

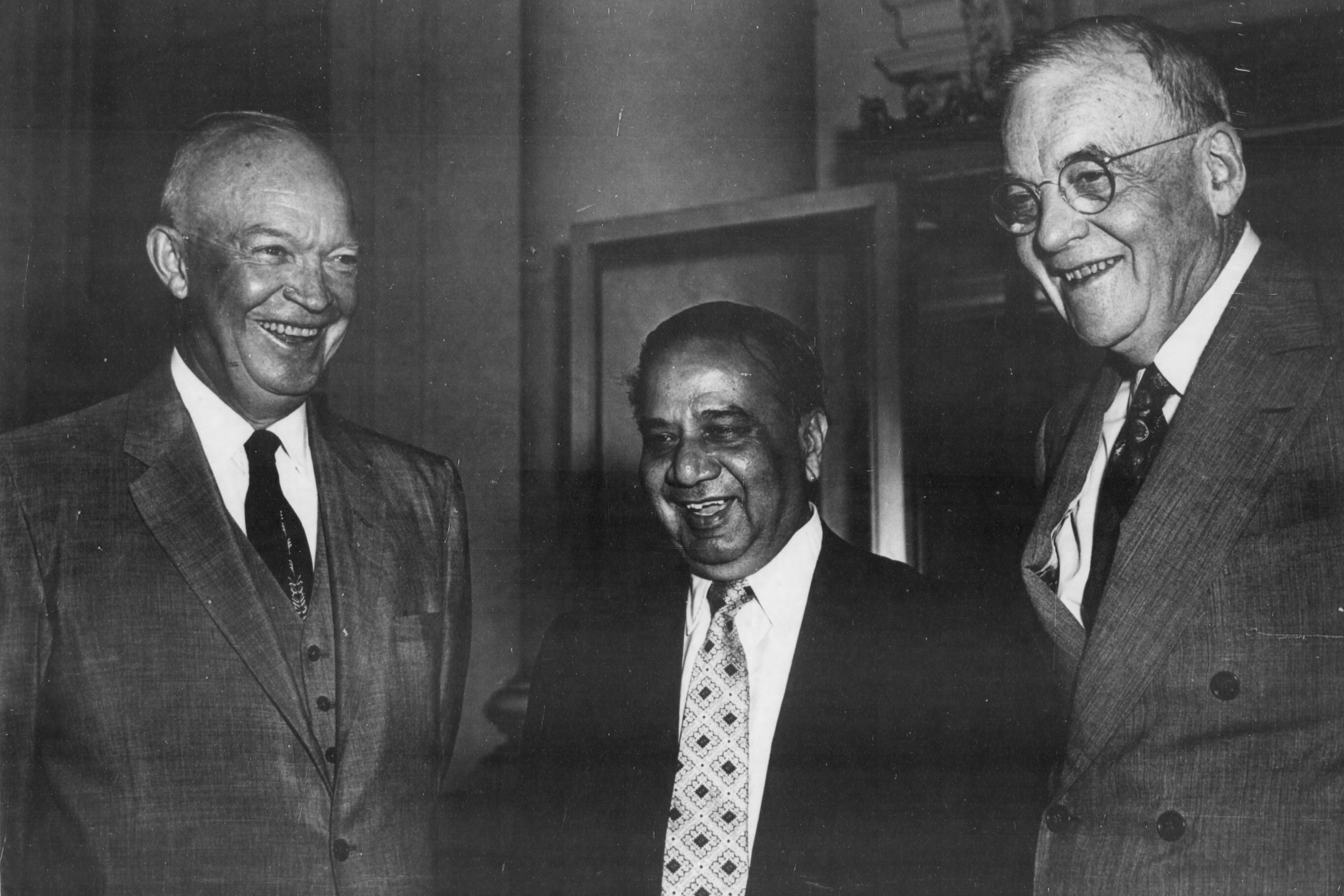
Suhrawardy (middle) with US President Dwight D. Eisenhower and Secretary of State John Foster Dulles

The Awami League's Suhrawardy succeeded Choudhry as prime minister in September 1956 and formed a coalition cabinet. He, like other Bengali politicians, was chosen by the central government to serve as a symbol of unity, but he failed to secure significant support from West Pakistani power brokers. Although he had a good reputation in East Pakistan and was respected for his pre-partition association with Mohandas K. Gandhi, his strenuous efforts to gain greater provincial autonomy for East Pakistan and a larger share of development funds for it were not well received in West Pakistan. Suhrawardy's thirteen months in office came to an end after he took a strong position against abrogation of the existing "One Unit" government for all of West Pakistan in favor of separate local governments for Sind, Punjab, Baluchistan, and the Khyber Pakhtunkhwa. He thus lost much support from West Pakistan's provincial politicians. He also used emergency powers to prevent the formation of a Muslim League provincial government in West Pakistan, thereby losing much Punjabi backing. Moreover, his open advocacy of votes of confidence from the Constituent Assembly as the proper means of forming governments aroused the suspicions of President Mirza. In 1957 the president used his considerable influence to oust Suhrawardy from the office of prime minister. The drift toward economic decline and political chaos continued.

=== 1958: coup ===
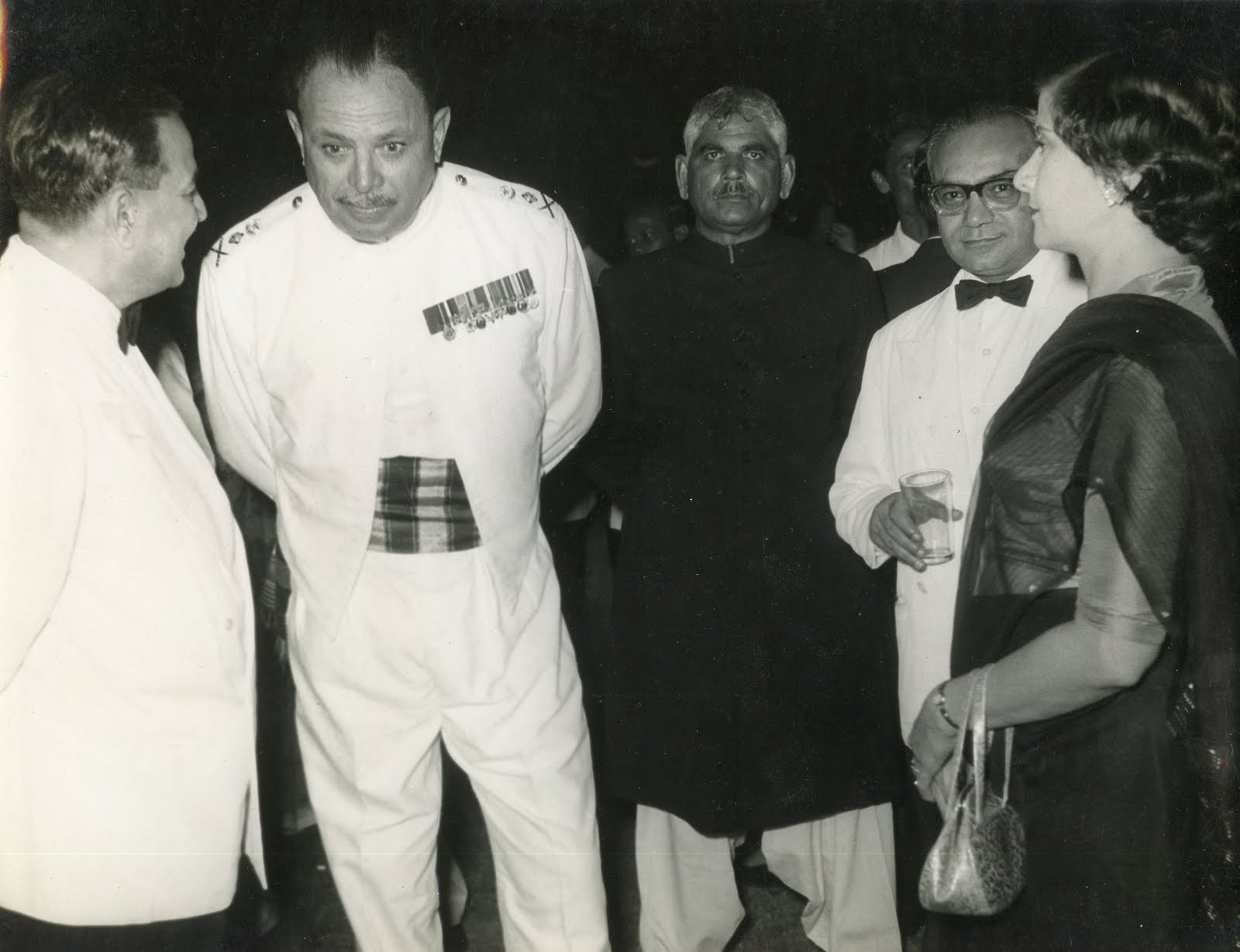
Ayub Khan (second from the left) with Huseyn Shaheed Suhrawardy (left) and Mr. (second from the right) and Mrs. (right) Shaikh Nazrul Bakar

On October 7, 1958, Iskander Mirza issued a proclamation that abolished political parties, abrogated the two-year-old constitution, and placed the country under martial law. Mirza announced that martial law would be a temporary measure lasting only until a new constitution was drafted. On October 27, he swore in a twelve-member cabinet that included Ayub Khan as prime minister and three other generals in ministerial positions. Included among the eight civilians was Zulfikar Ali Bhutto, a former university lecturer. On the same day, the general exiled Mirza to London because "the armed services and the people demanded a clean break with the past". Until 1962, martial law continued and Ayub purged a number of politicians and civil servants from the government and replaced them with army officers. Ayub called his regime a "revolution to clean up the mess of black marketing and corruption".

=== 1962: Constitution and education movement ===
The new constitution promulgated by Ayub in March 1962 vested all executive authority of the republic in the president. As chief executive, the president could appoint ministers without approval by the legislature. There was no provision for a prime minister. There was a provision for a National Assembly and two provincial assemblies, whose members were to be chosen by the "Basic Democrats"—80,000 voters organised into a five-tier hierarchy, with each tier electing officials to the next tier. Pakistan was declared a republic (without being specifically an Islamic republic) but, in deference to the ulamas (religious scholars), the president was required to be a Muslim, and no law could be passed that was contrary to the tenets of Islam.

The 1962 constitution made few concessions to Bengalis. It was, instead, a document that buttressed centralised government under the guise of "basic democracies" programs, gave legal support to martial law, and turned parliamentary bodies into forums for debate. Throughout the Ayub years, East Pakistan and West Pakistan grew farther apart. The death of the Awami League's Suhrawardy in 1963 gave the mercurial Sheikh Mujibur Rahman (commonly known as Mujib) the leadership of East Pakistan's dominant party. Mujib, who as early as 1956 had advocated the "liberation" of East Pakistan and had been jailed in 1958 during the military coup, quickly and successfully brought the issue of East Pakistan's movement for autonomy to the forefront of the nation's politics.

Same year, students in East Pakistan protested against Sharif Commission's report. The protest than turned violent in few days leading to use of force by law enforcements.

=== 1964 ===
Deadly campaigns of ethnic cleansing of Hindus broke out in East Pakistan in 1964 over fake news spread by the Ayub Khan regime that Indian forces had desecrated the Hazratbal shrine of Srinagar in the disputed state of Kashmir, stealing the enshrined relic of the Islamic prophet Muhammad's hair in process. This caused a large scale exodus of Hindus into India, which in turn sparked of retaliatory violence.

=== Economic issues ===
During the years between 1960 and 1965, the annual rate of growth of the gross domestic product per capita was 4.4% in West Pakistan versus just 2.6% in East Pakistan. Furthermore, Bengali politicians pushing for more autonomy complained that much of Pakistan's export earnings were generated in East Pakistan by the export of Bengali jute and tea. As late as 1960, approximately 70% of Pakistan's export earnings originated in the East Wing, although this percentage declined as international demand for jute dwindled. By the mid-1960s, the East Wing was accounting for less than 60% of the nation's export earnings, and by the time of Bangladesh's independence in 1971, this percentage had dipped below 50%. Mujib demanded in 1966 that separate foreign exchange accounts be kept and that separate trade offices be opened overseas. By the mid-1960s, West Pakistan was benefiting from Ayub's "Decade of Progress", with its successful "green revolution" in wheat, and from the expansion of markets for West Pakistani textiles, while the East Pakistani standard of living remained at an abysmally low level. Bengalis were also upset that West Pakistan, because it was the seat of government, was the major beneficiary of foreign aid.

== 1966–71 ==
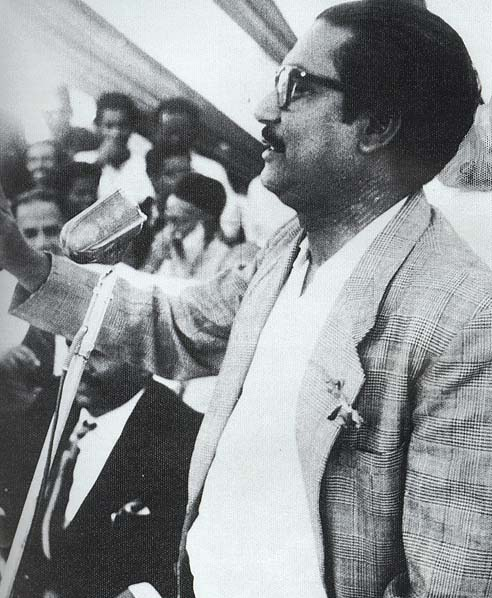
Sheikh Mujibur Rahman announcing the six points in Lahore

At a 1966 Lahore conference of both the eastern and the western chapters of the Awami League, Mujib announced his six-point political and economic program (on 5 February) for East Pakistani provincial autonomy.

Six Points

- The Constitution should provide for a Federation of Pakistan in its true sense based on the Lahore Resolution, and the parliamentary form of government with supremacy of a Legislature directly elected on the basis of universal adult franchise.
- The federal government should deal with only two subjects: Defence and Foreign Affairs, and all other residual subjects should be vested in the federating states.
- Two separate, but freely convertible currencies for two wings should be introduced; or if this is not feasible, there should be one currency for the whole country, but effective constitutional provisions should be introduced to stop the flight of capital from East to West Pakistan. Furthermore, a separate Banking Reserve should be established and separate fiscal and monetary policy be adopted for East Pakistan.
- The power of taxation and revenue collection should be vested in the federating units and the federal centre would have no such power. The federation would be entitled to a share in the state taxes to meet its expenditures.
- There should be two separate accounts for the foreign exchange earnings of the two wings; the foreign exchange requirements of the federal government should be met by the two wings equally or in a ratio to be fixed; indigenous products should move free of duty between the two wings, and the constitution should empower the units to establish trade links with foreign countries.
- East Pakistan should have a separate military or paramilitary force, and Navy headquarters should be in East Pakistan.

Mujib's six points ran directly counter to President Ayub's plan for greater national integration. Ayub's anxieties were shared by many West Pakistanis, who feared that Mujib's plan would divide Pakistan by encouraging ethnic and linguistic cleavages in West Pakistan, and would leave East Pakistan, with its Bengali ethnic and linguistic unity, by far the most populous and powerful of the federating units. Ayub interpreted Mujib's demands as tantamount to a call for independence. After pro-Mujib supporters rioted in a general strike in Dhaka, the government arrested Mujib in January 1968.

Ayub suffered a number of setbacks in 1968. His health was poor, and he was almost assassinated at a ceremony marking ten years of his rule. Riots followed, and Zulfikar Ali Bhutto was arrested as the instigator. At Dhaka a tribunal that inquired into the activities of the already-interned Mujib was arousing strong popular resentment against Ayub. A conference of opposition leaders and the cancellation of the state of emergency (in effect since 1965) came too late to conciliate the opposition. On February 21, 1969, Ayub announced that he would not run in the next presidential election in 1970. A state of near anarchy reigned with protests and strikes throughout the country. The police appeared helpless to control the mob violence, and the military stood aloof. At length, on March 25 Ayub resigned and handed over the administration to the commander in chief, General Agha Mohammad Yahya Khan. Once again the country was placed under martial law.

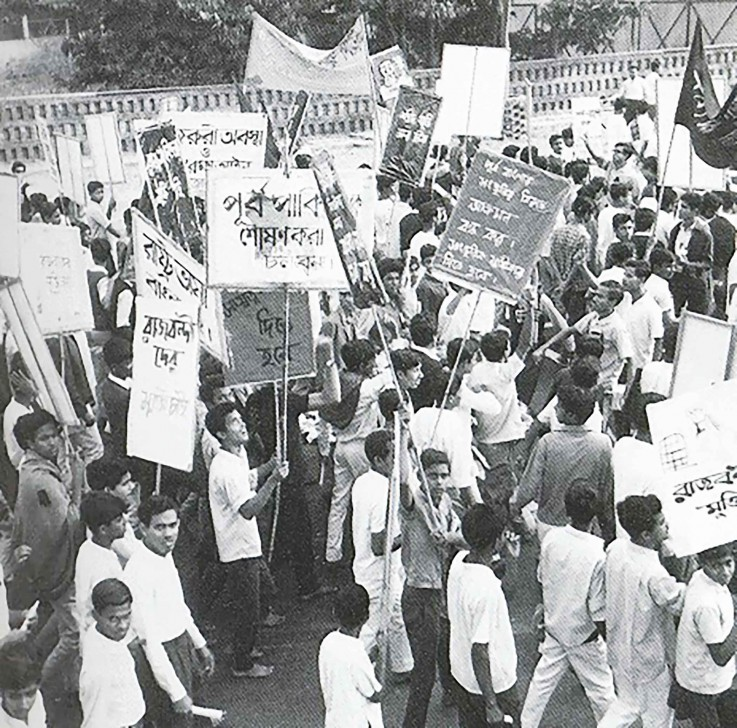
A student procession at the University of Dhaka campus during the mass protests and riots of 1969

General Yahya assumed the titles of Chief Martial Law Administrator and President. He announced that he considered himself to be a transitional leader whose task would be to restore order and to conduct free elections for a new constituent assembly, which would then draft a new constitution. He appointed a largely civilian cabinet in August 1969 in preparation for the election, which was scheduled to take place in December 1970. Yahya moved with dispatch to settle two contentious issues by decree: the unpopular "One Unit" of West Pakistan, which was created as a condition for the 1956 constitution, was ended; and East Pakistan was awarded 162 seats out of the 300-member National Assembly.

On November 12, 1970, a cyclone devastated an area of almost 8,000 square kilometres (3,100 sq mi) of East Pakistan's mid-coastal lowlands and its outlying islands in the Bay of Bengal. As many as 250,000 lives were lost. Two days after the cyclone hit, Yahya arrived in Dhaka after a trip to Beijing, but he left a day later. His racist contempt towards Bengalis exposed by the seeming indifference to the plight of Bengali victims caused a great deal of animosity. Yahya Khan blamed the Indian government for refusing to allow Pakistani helicopters carrying relief materials to reach East Pakistan to fly over Indian airspace, which the Indian government denied. Opposition newspapers in Dhaka accused the Pakistani government of impeding the efforts of international relief agencies and of "gross neglect, callous inattention, and bitter indifference". Mujib, who had been released from prison, lamented that "West Pakistan has a bumper wheat crop, but the first shipment of food grain to reach us is from abroad" and "that the textile merchants have not given a yard of cloth for our shrouds". "We have a large army", Mujib continued, "but it is left to the British Marines to bury our dead". He added, "the feeling now pervades... every village, home, and slum that we must rule ourselves. We must make the decisions that matter. We will no longer suffer arbitrary rule by bureaucrats, capitalists, and feudal interests of West Pakistan."

Yahya had announced plans for the December 7 national election, and urged voters to elect candidates who were committed to the integrity and unity of Pakistan. The elections were the first in the history of Pakistan in which voters were able to elect members of the National Assembly directly. In a convincing demonstration of Bengali dissatisfaction with the West Pakistani regime, the Awami League won all but two of the 169 seats allotted East Pakistan in the National Assembly. Bhutto's Pakistan Peoples Party came in a poor second nationally, winning 81 out of the 138 West Pakistani seats in the National Assembly. The Awami League's electoral victory promised it control of the government, with Mujib as the country's prime minister, but the inaugural assembly never met.

The number of West Pakistani troops entering East Pakistan had increased sharply in the preceding weeks, climbing from a pre-crisis level of 25,000 to about 60,000, bringing the army close to a state of readiness. As tensions rose, however, Yahya continued negotiations with Mujib, flying to Dhaka in mid-March. Talks between Yahya and Mujib were joined by Bhutto but soon collapsed, and on March 23, Bengalis following Mujib's lead defiantly celebrated "Resistance Day" in East Pakistan instead of the traditional all-Pakistan "Republic Day". Yahya decided to "solve" the problem of East Pakistan by ordering extirmination of Bengalis. On the evening of March 25 he flew back to Islamabad. The military crackdown in East Pakistan began that same night.

== 1971: liberation ==
The eleven sectors during the Bangladesh Liberation War

On March 25, the Pakistan Army launched, Operation Searchlight, a genocidal crackdown which attempted to suppress Bengali nationalism. Within hours a wholesale attack had commenced in Dhaka, with the heaviest casualties concentrated on the University of Dhaka and the Hindu-inhabited areas of the old town. The Pakistan Army came with hitlists of Bengali intelligentsia (most of whom happened to be Hindus) and systematically killed several hundred Bengalis. Mujib was captured and flown to West Pakistan for incarceration.

To conceal what they were doing, the Pakistan Army corralled the corps of foreign journalists at the International Hotel in Dhaka, seized their notes, and expelled them the next day. Simon Dring, a reporter for The Daily Telegraph who escaped the censor net, estimated that three battalions of troops—one armored, one artillery, and one infantry—had attacked the virtually defenseless city. Various informants, including missionaries and foreign journalists who clandestinely returned to East Pakistan during the war, estimated that by March 28 the loss of life reached 15,000. By the end of summer as many as 300,000 people were thought to have lost their lives. Anthony Mascarenhas in Bangladesh: A Legacy of Blood estimates that during the entire nine-month liberation struggle more than one million Bengalis may have died at the hands of the Pakistan Army.

The West Pakistani press waged a vigorous but ultimately futile campaign to counteract newspaper and radio accounts of atrocities. One paper, the Morning News, even editorialised that the armed forces were saving East Pakistanis from eventual Hindu enslavement. The civil war was played down by the government-controlled press as a minor insurrection quickly being brought under control.

After the tragic events of March, India became vocal in its condemnation of Pakistan. An immense flood of East Pakistani refugees, between 8 and 10 million according to various estimates, fled across the border into the Indian state of West Bengal. In April, an Indian parliamentary resolution demanded that Prime Minister Indira Gandhi supply aid to the rebels in East Pakistan. Mr. K.C. Pant, being the state minister for Home Affairs was assigned the responsibility of handling the situation of refugees in West Bengal. Upon Mr. Pant's recommendation She complied but declined to recognise the provisional government of independent Bangladesh.

A propaganda war between Pakistan and India ensued in which Yahya threatened war against India if that country made an attempt to seize any part of Pakistan. Yahya also asserted that Pakistan could count on its American and Chinese friends. At the same time, Pakistan tried to ease the situation in the East Wing. Belatedly, it replaced Tikka, whose military tactics had caused such havoc and human loss of life, with the more restrained Lieutenant General A.A.K. Niazi. A moderate Bengali, Abdul Malik, was installed as the civilian governor of East Pakistan. These belated gestures of appeasement did not yield results or change world opinion.

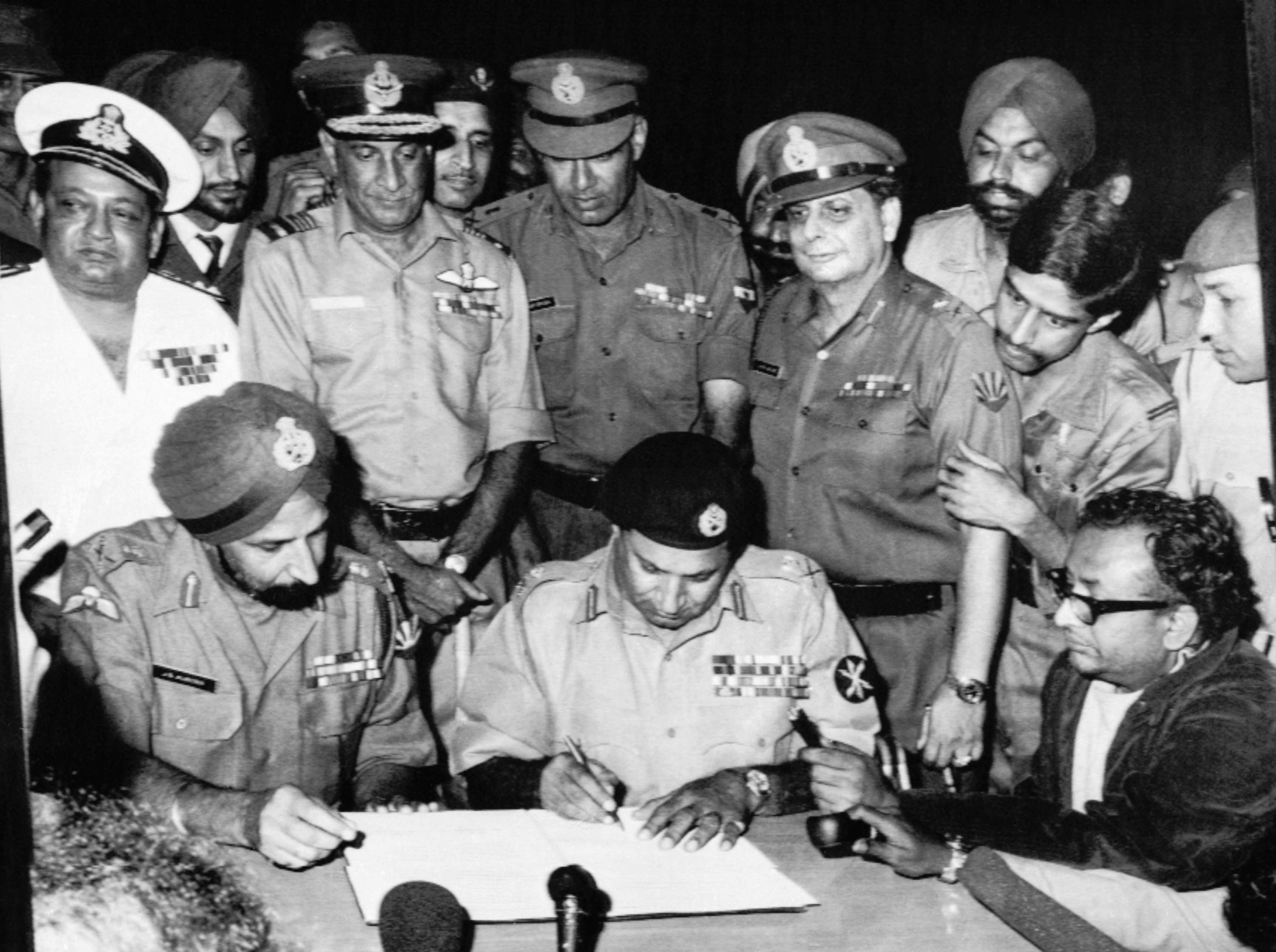
Surrender of Pakistan

On December 4, 1971, the Indian Army, far superior in numbers and equipment to that of Pakistan, executed a three-pronged pincer movement on Dhaka launched from the Indian states of West Bengal, Assam, and Tripura, taking only 12 days to defeat the 90,000 Pakistani defenders. The Pakistan Army was weakened by having to operate so far away from its source of supply. The Indian Army, on the other hand, was aided by East Pakistan's Mukti Bahini (Liberation Force), the freedom fighters who managed to keep the Pakistan Army at bay in many areas. On 16 December 1971, the Pakistan army wing in East Pakistan led by Niazi surrendered and Bangladesh was liberated. This day is celebrated in Bangladesh as "Victory Day" with more emphasis than Independence Day (26 March 1971).

== See also ==
- History of Pakistan (1947-present)

== Sources ==
- Heitzman, James; Worden, Robert, eds. (1989). Bangladesh: A Country Study. Washington, D.C.: Federal Research Division, Library of Congress.
- Wolpert, Stanley (1984). Jinnah of Pakistan. New York: Oxford University Press. ISBN 0-19-503412-0.
