= 1963 Hazratbal Shrine theft =

1963 incident in Jammu and Kashmir, India

On 27 December 1963, Moi-e-Muqqadas, a relic believed by many to be strand from the beard of Prophet Muhammad, went missing the from the Hazratbal Shrine in Jammu and Kashmir, leading to widespread protests across the Indian subcontinent.

The relic was recovered on 4 January 1964.

== History of the relic ==
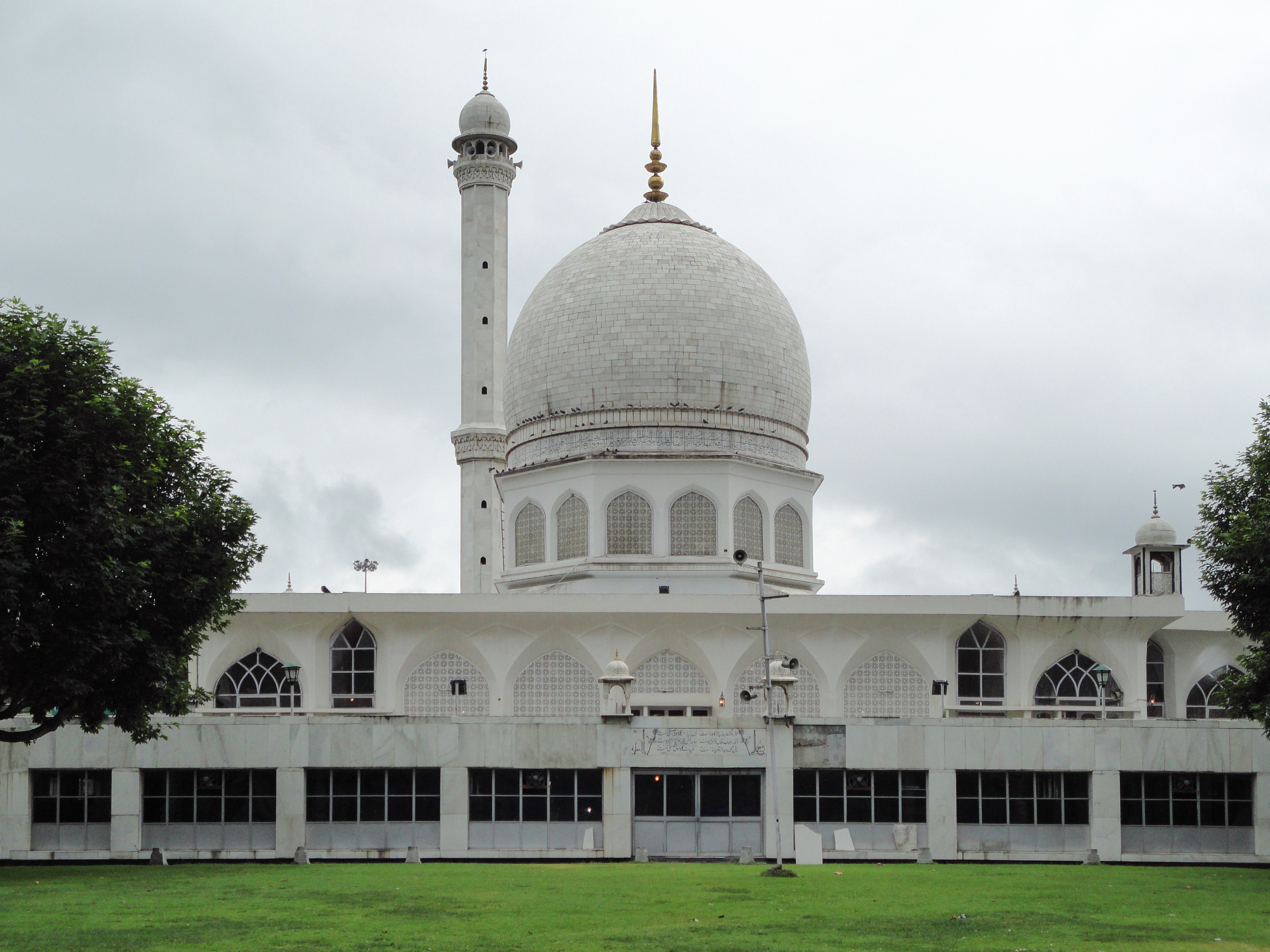
The Hazratbal Shrine in 2010

The Blessed Relic was brought to Indian city of Bijapur in 1635 by Syed Abdullah Madani. It was then passed through his son Syed Hamid to a Kashmiri businessman named Nooruddin. In the late 17th century, the Mughal emperor Aurangzeb imprisoned Nooruddin and seized the relic, moving it to the Sufi tomb in Ajmer. Aurangzeb returned the relic in 1700 after Nooruddin had died. The relic was preserved by his descendants and kept in a place that later became the Hazratbal Shrine.

== Theft ==
On 27 December 1963, news broke out that the holy relic was stolen from the shrine. Around 50,000 people carrying black flags demonstrated in front of the shrine. According to The Times of India, the Srinagar superintendent of police said that he believed that the theft had occurred around 2 am when the custodians of the shrine were sleeping.

The next day, the Chief Minister of the state, Khwaja Shams-ud-Din, reached the shrine and announced an award of ₹100,000 for providing information regarding the theft. On 29 December, a curfew was imposed and police arrested the Congress leader Mohammad Shafi Qureshi. To investigate the theft, on 31 December, Indian Prime Minister Jawaharlal Nehru sent the head of the Central Bureau of Investigation, Bhola Nath Mullik, to Kashmir. Mirwaiz Maulvi Farooq set up the Sacred Relic Action Committee, of which he was the president.

On 4 January 1964, the relic was recovered, and the Sadr-i-Riyasat Karan Singh organised prayers at a Hindu temple to help dispel communal tension. The relic was inspected and identified by Sayyid Meerak Shah Kashani as being genuine. Shah Kashani said he had seen the relic many times and could easily identify it.

Sayyid Meerak recited a poem:

The Garden is bright with the light of Muhammad

The light of Muhammad is reflected in every flower and every plant.

— Sayyid Meerak,

When Mullick informed Nehru about the recovery, Nehru said to Mullick that "you have saved Kashmir for India". In his memoirs, Mullick claims that the information about the investigation was not disclosed. The Home Minister of India, Gulzarilal Nanda, also said in the parliament that the thieves "shall be identified".

On 17 January 1964, Nanda publicly identified the suspects, all three of whom were Kashmiri Muslims: the shrine's mujawar (caretaker) Abdul Rahim Bandey, local villager Abdul Rashid (who was caught while returning the relic), and "an important person who we believe has some affiliation with Pakistan" giving his name as Kadir Butt. (The third's name was briefly reported in Parliament as "Ghulam Mohd. Butt," but was corrected later the same day.)

== Aftermath ==
Identification by its caretakers and other investigation made by the Government of Jammu and Kashmir (law and order), special identification team says its authenticity is indeed original. Post identification, a public deedar ("viewing") of the relic was organized on 6 February coinciding with the anniversary of martyrdom of the fourth Caliph of Islam, Ali bin Abu Talib.

The incident triggered riots and ethnic cleansing of Hindus in East Pakistan. Hundreds of thousands of Hindu refugees poured into India between December 1963 and February 1964 as a result of the violence. The stories of atrocities told by these refugees caused violence and rioting against Muslims in Calcutta in the Indian state of West Bengal. Thousands of Christian tribals were also evicted later from East Pakistan and arrived in India as refugees.

A fictionalized version of the incident is the subject of Salman Rushdie's short story "The Prophet's Hair" (1981).
