= 1964 Calcutta riots =

Religious riots in Calcutta, India

- Part of Religious violence in India
- Location: Calcutta (presently known as Kolkata)
- Date: January 1964
- Target: Muslims
- Deaths: Official: 264 (mostly Muslims): 208 due to communal violence; 56 due to police and military action; Unofficial estimates: 100-500
- Injuries: 430+
- Motive: Revenge for the 1964 East Pakistan riots; Communal violence

The 1964 Calcutta riot was a religious riot that occurred in January 1964 and spread throughout the city of Calcutta. This event was the first intense religious violence in the city since the 1946 riots.

The Calcutta riots began in the background of anti-Hindu 1964 East Pakistan riots (in present-day Bangladesh), in which initially 29 Hindus died, and several hundred Hindu families fled to West Bengal. Subsequently, in Calcutta, a large procession of Hindu students marched against the East Pakistan government, but clashes ensued when the procession was attacked by a Muslim mob, in which a local was stabbed.

On January 10, 1964, police firing caused the death of a Hindu protester near Jadavpur. The New York Times reported a death toll of 60 by 12 January, mostly in clashes between police and Hindu demonstrators. The BBC reported that more than 100 people had died by 13 January. The violence included attacks resulting in bloodshed, property destruction, and organized looting, which led to the death of at least 264 people, according to official records. Unofficial estimates of casualties ranged from 100 to 500.

== Background ==
The violence in Calcutta began to develop on 27 December 1963, when a sacred relic believed by many to be a strand from the beard of Islamic Prophet Muhammad was stolen from the Hazratbal Shrine in Jammu and Kashmir. This incident sparked protests and mass agitation, which fueled hatred towards the minority Hindu community in East Pakistan (present-day Bangladesh) and eventually led to a violent riot turning into an exodus in the border districts of present-day Khulna Division, resulting in the deaths of 29 Hindus.

Despite strict international border controls, several hundred Hindu refugees crossed into the adjacent Hindu-majority Indian state of West Bengal due to the harsh conditions of the riot. As they moved towards Calcutta, approximately 30 miles from the frontier, they narrated stories of torture they suffered in Khulna and Jessore, which incited retaliation against Muslims in rural areas of West Bengal. By the evening of 9 January 1964, the impoverished slums on the eastern outskirts of Calcutta began to stir.

== Timeline ==
=== 8 January ===
The news of violence against Hindus in East Pakistan spread throughout the city and suburbs by local press and migrated refugees. The resentment of the Hindu community first started to appear at the late hours of 8 January as Muslim stalls in the Sealdah area of central Calcutta were shut down by Hindu mobs.

=== 9 January ===
Public meetings were held in various parts of the city to protest against the aggression of Muslims towards Hindus in East Pakistan. A large procession marched to the Deputy High Commissioner of East Pakistan demanding protection from the Pakistani government for Hindu victims and ensuring proper punishment for the people involved in violence there. They also burned effigies of Pakistani President Ayub Khan. The problems precipitated when an evening procession mostly done by students was attacked by a Muslim group with sticks, bricks, and soda-water bottles at Wellington Crossing. The same night a Hindu was stabbed to death by Muslim mobs in central Kolkata resulting in intense hatred among local Hindus which developed central Kolkata into the hotspot of the riot in the coming days.

=== 10 January ===
On the morning of Friday, 10 January, communal incidents occurred in the Taltolla, Beniapukur, Entally, and Beliaghata police station areas of Calcutta where stray cases of assault, arson, and looting were reported. The police opened fire on five occasions and used 36 rounds of tear gas. Besides this, Hindu students in and around Calcutta boycotted schools and colleges and organized a march to Pakistan High Commissioner in order to protest against the communal violence in East Pakistan, which took the life of 29 Hindus. During this, a sudden involvement and confrontation of police caused the death of a protester named Bahudeb Sen, a BA first-year student from Andrew's College, who was shot by police firing near Jadavpur. The situation began to get worse after that and evoked considerable agitated response among the youth, the masses, and the intelligentsia. On the other hand, the Bangaon region along with Maheshtala, Rajabazar, Beliaghata, Entally and Sonarpur witnessed mob clashing with the police.

=== 11 January ===
The riot started to reach its peak intensity in Calcutta as the Army had to be called in on 11 January to quell the rioting. The areas of Jadavpur, Budge-Budge, Metiabruz, Maheshtala and Sonarpur were clamped with 10pm-5am curfew. The situation at the outskirts of the city was also grim as in Gaighata near Bangaon three policemen were killed by a group of Hindu mobs because the policemen ordered the Hindus not to attack a Muslim village.

Units of the Indian Army moved into Calcutta in the afternoon to reinforce the city. The army opened fire on mobs and looters twice before nightfall, according to official reports. 8 of the city's 10 police wards were silenced by a dusk-to-dawn curfew that night, and soldiers patrolled the streets in the slum areas in eastern Calcutta. By night, the officials estimated that over sixty people were killed in the last three days. More than 50 cases of arson were reported just on that one day.

From 9 to 11 January, about 20,000 people crossed the border to enter Pakistan, with females and children outnumbering males by three to one. Government relief for them in Pakistan was extremely inadequate, but local people came forward to help. To deal with this sudden influx, a Central Relief Committee was established in Jessore, one of the border districts of East Pakistan, with Ahmed Ali Sardar M.N.A. as chairman and Mosharraf Hossain L.L.B. as Secretary.

=== 12 January ===
The riot continued with the same intensity on 12 January. Mosques and Muslim shops and homes were set afire with kerosene-soaked rags. Harsh violence were continued to be reported from various parts of the city like Sealdah, Taltola, Beliaghata, Entally, Beniapukur, Garia. The death toll was not announced that night, although nine more dead bodies were to yet to be found. Another army battalion was ordered to Calcutta along with three police battalions from neighboring states to establish law and order in the city.

=== 13 January ===
The condition of the Muslim community became very harsh by 13 January. The official death toll crossed 100, more than 70,000 Muslims were estimated to fled their homes in the city, and 55,000 were sleeping in the open under army protection at that point of time. Although there had been several incidents of stabbing and bombing, most of the riots resulted in the looting and burning of Muslim property. More than 110 people had to be hospitalised following the shootings and firemen had to deal with 200 cases of arson since the start of the riot. Two rubber factories were set on fire along with a number of shops, homes and dwellings.

A 24-hour curfew was extended to five areas of the city occupied by police officers following the increase in number of arson attacks and looting against Muslims. Buses and trams were taken off the road and most shops and markets had been shut down. The Indian Government claimed the trouble in Calcutta to be a "huge loss of life".

== Casualties and displacement ==
Official and independent sources provide varying figures for casualties. The New York Times reported a death toll of 60 by 12 January, mostly in clashes between police and Hindu demonstrators. The BBC reported that more than 100 people had died by 13 January. A U.S. State Department document from the period estimated the death toll in Calcutta and surrounding areas at around 175, but noted the total could be higher. The violence also prompted a significant influx of Hindu refugees from East Pakistan.

While the Calcutta riots were brought under control by January 15, 1964, the violence in East Pakistan increased, and on 18 January, The Daily Ittefaq reported that 95% of the ruined houses belong to the Hindus in old Dhaka and about 100,000 Hindus were rendered homeless in Dhaka city. On 23 January, The Hindu, quoting the Pakistan authorities, reported that around 1,000 persons were killed in communal violence in Dhaka over the previous week.

== Government and Army response ==
The Indian government responded swiftly, deploying the army and imposing curfews. Police and military forces were authorized to open fire on violent mobs. Union Home Minister Gulzarilal Nanda visited affected areas and emphasized the protection of Muslim lives. Public transport was suspended, and most shops and markets were closed.

== Broader context and consequences ==
The riots occurred against a backdrop of long-standing communal tensions, exacerbated by the recent influx of refugees and the legacy of partition-era violence. The violence deepened communal divides and contributed to the further ghettoization of Muslim communities in Calcutta. The riots also underscored the fragility of communal harmony in post-independence India.

== Summary ==
Date	Key Events	Outcome
27 Dec 1963	Theft of Hazratbal relic; protests in East Pakistan	Communal tensions rise
9–10 Jan 1964	Violence in Calcutta; police firing; student killed	Tensions escalate
11 Jan 1964	Army deployed; curfew imposed; peak violence	60+ killed in three days
12–13 Jan 1964	Continued arson, looting, displacement	100+ dead; 70,000 displaced
