= 1964 East Pakistan riots =

Ethnic cleansing of Hindus in East Pakistan (modern-day Bangladesh)

1964 East Pakistan Ethnic Cleansing
- Rioters attacking the Dhakeshwari Temple in Dhaka
- Location: East Pakistan
- Date: 2 January 1964 – 28 March 1964
- Target: Bengali Hindus, Garos
- Attack type: Massacre, Forced conversion, Plunder, Arson, Abduction and Rape
- Deaths: 1,000+ (Pakistani government estimate)
- Perpetrators: Ansars, East-Pakistan Rifles, Muslim rioters
- Motive: Retaliation for 1963 Hazratbal Shrine theft

The 1964 East Pakistan riots refer to the massacre and ethnic cleansing of Bengali Hindus from East Pakistan in the wake of an alleged theft of what was believed to be the hair of the Islamic prophet Muhammad from the Hazratbal shrine in Jammu and Kashmir in India. The salient feature of the pogroms was its urban nature and selective targeting of Bengali Hindu owned industries and merchant establishments in the capital city of Dhaka. This resulted in unending waves of Bengali Hindu refugees in neighbouring West Bengal. The refugee rehabilitation became a national problem in India, and hundreds of refugees were resettled in Dandakaranya region of Odisha & Madhya Pradesh (now in Chhattisgarh).

== Background ==
On 27 December 1963, the hair of Muhammad reportedly went missing from the Hazratbal Shrine in Srinagar in Kashmir. There were mass protests in Jammu and Kashmir over the disappearance of the relic. While returning to Islamabad, the President of Pakistan Muhammad Ayub Khan made a statement at the Dhaka airport that he won't be responsible for any reaction in Pakistan in response to the Hazratbal incident. The Pakistan Convention Muslim League declared 'Kashmir Day' on 3 January 1964. On 4 January 1964, the relic was discovered and the miscreants were arrested. However, the next day Pakistan Radio described the discovered relic as fake.

== Killings ==
=== Khulna ===
Abdus Sabur Khan, the Communications Minister of Pakistan, had forcibly occupied 30 bighas of land from one Rupchand Biswas, a Hindu landowner from Matikhali in 1960 and erected a three-storeyed building in it. Rupchand Biswas instituted a case against Khan which the latter lost. The court decreed Abdus Sabur Khan to pay 135,000 rupees. He approached Biswas for an out of the court settlement which he refused. In the meanwhile, Majid Mian, the nominee of Abdus Sabur Khan lost in the district council elections. After the loss, Khan and his party members including the Chairman of Chamkuri Union Board held the Hindus responsible for the defeat and began to threaten them with dire consequences. During this time the Hazratbal incident took place. Khan used the opportunity to teach the Hindus a lesson.

On 2 January 1964, the Hindus were not allowed to wear shoes, use umbrellas or ride a rickshaw as a mark of mourning for the loss of relic. In the afternoon, processions in Khulna mourning the loss of relic, went around the town shouting "Kill the Hindus". At around 4 pm, attacks on Hindus started. After 4 hours of mayhem, curfew was imposed in Khulna at 8 pm. 3 January was declared as "Kashmir Day" by the Pakistan Convention Muslim League. A general strike was declared in Khulna. Abdus Sabur Khan addressed a huge gathering at Daulatpur industrial area in the outskirts of Khulna. Thousands of Muslims, mostly Biharis, armed with deadly weapons assembled at Daulatpur to listen to Khan. Khan delivered a rabidly anti-Hindu and anti-India speech, where he described the Hazratbal incident as a Hindu conspiracy. Immediately after the meeting, a 20,000 strong Muslim crowd spread out in the neighbouring localities of Senhati, Maheshwarpasha, Pabla, Chandani Mal and Daulatpur and began to loot Hindu properties and set them on fire. Many Hindus were killed or brutally assaulted. A section of the mob marched towards Khulna, disrupting rail and road traffic reaching the town at sunset. For the next four days an orgy of loot, arson, murder, rape and abduction continued in Khulna. The violence against the Hindus were led by the Muslim workers of Khulna Shipyard, Dada Co., Ispahani Co., and Kata Co. Soleman, the Chairman of Loppur Union supplied the attackers with firearms. About 200–300 Bengali Hindus were massacred at the Khulna Launch Ghat by Muslim marauders. All the villages along the road from Khulna to Chalna were destroyed. On 4 January, the violence spread to Mongla. An estimated 300 Hindus were either killed or injured at Mongla port.

Abdus Sabur Khan addressed three more meetings at Rampal. Leaflets were distributed, warning of terrible riots in Pakistan and annihilation of the Hindus. The Hindus were warned to leave Pakistan immediately. At Loppur Bazar, he addressed another gathering, where he said that he would make shoes out of Hindu skin, torn from their back. Once the violence escalated, Khan became occupied with the marriage of his niece and refused every plea to intervene to end the violence. The marriage was attended by Abdul Monem Khan (the Governor of East Pakistan) and Kazi Abdul Kader (member of the National Assembly and East Pakistani Minister of Food and Agriculture).

=== Dhaka ===
On 13 January, a meeting was held at the Dhaka stadium regarding the Hazratbal incident. On 14 and 15 January, Hindu passengers in the mail trains arriving at Dhaka from Chittagong and Sirajganj was asked to get down at Tongi and Tejgaon. Those who refused to get down were slaughtered. On 15 January, a Muslim mob arrived at 20 Nawabpur Road, entered the house and struck off the head of the priest and desecrated the images of Radha Krishna. Four male members of the house were killed. The Das Studio on Nawabpur Road was looted and burnt to ashes.

On the night of 15 January, Hindu homes in Nagarkhanpur were attacked and looted. On 15 January, the Ramakrishna Mission at Tikatuli was burnt. Three buildings, seven huts, one temple, one charitable hospital, one library and one students' hostel were completely destroyed. Two Hindus were stabbed to death. After the Hazratbal incident, the Hindu students hostel of East Pakistan University of Engineering and Technology were pelted with stones every night. The Muslim students owing allegiance to the Jamaat-e-Islami began to call the Hindu students Indian spies.

On 16 January, Krishna De (of Central Bank), Pran Kumar De (of United Industrial Bank), and another Hindu employee of Baroda Bank were fleeing in a car after hiding in the bank premises for two days. Their car was stopped and they were murdered. The F.M.E School, public library, Vivekananda Physical Club and the Hiralal Lohia Charitable Hospital at Hiralal Sewagram were burnt. Truckloads of dead bodies were brought to the hospitals from where they were sent to the burial grounds. Hundreds of Hindus were buried with military escorts. Even the identified bodies were not returned to their relatives. In Rayerbazar, the Kumbhakars were attacked by the Bihari Muslims from Mohammadpur. Each and every house were set on fire. 96 Bengali Hindus were killed in the massacre. Many women were raped and many young girls were abducted. The locality was ethnically cleansed of Bengali Hindus and renamed to Zafrabad. Bani Bhaban, a Hindu boy's hostel at Ishwar Das Lane, was broken into and completely looted. The boys escaped and took shelter in a relief camp. Nari Shiksha Mandir was attacked, where Abani Guha Roy, the head clerk was killed and Jagajiban Bose, a senior teacher was stabbed. In localities like Tikatuli and Wari, the walls were painted with slogans like Kill Hindus, Hindu Marwari Maro, etc. On 18 January, the 24-hour curfew was imposed, with troops patrolling the streets. The curfew was later extended till 8 am on 19 January.

Hundreds of villages all around Dhaka city were burnt to ashes. On 18 January, The Daily Ittefaq reported that 95% of the ruined houses belong to the Hindus in old Dhaka and about 100,000 Hindus were rendered homeless in Dhaka city. On 23 January, The Hindu, quoting the Pakistan authorities, reported that around 1,000 persons were killed in communal violence in Dhaka over the previous week. However, an American Peace Corps nurse stated that on 21 January there were 600 dead in Dhaka Medical College and Hospital alone.

=== Narayanganj ===
Karim, the General Manager of the Adamjee Group declared a holiday in the Adamjee Jute Mills on 13 and 14 January and spread a rumour that his brother had been killed in Kolkata. On the night of 13 January, the workers of the Adamjee Jute Mills attacked the Hindu quarters, mostly inhabited by the workers of Dhakeshwari Cotton Mills No. 2 and set the Hindu houses on fire. Satyen Roy, the Manager of Dhakeshwari Cotton Mill No. 2 called Sunil Bose, the managing director at 3 am and reported that the mill was on fire and asked for police and military. Early in the morning at about 5 AM, 20,000 workers of Adamjee Jute Mills broke into the compound of Dhakeshwari Cotton Mills No. 2 and resorted to indiscriminate looting, arson and murder. More than 700 Hindus, men, women and children were massacred. Several women were abducted. At about 7 AM about 2,000 to 3,000 Hindu men, women and children rushed to the compound of Lakshminarayan Cotton Mills for safety. The mill was stopped and the workers rushed outside and closed the gates. Thousands of Hindus had assembled outside the gates, seeking shelter and the gates had to be opened to let them in. By 9 AM around 10,000 Hindus had taken shelter in the compound. Soon after a 2,000 strong Muslim mob armed with lathis and iron rods broke in and launched a severe assault on the hapless people in which three persons died and about a dozen were injured.

The house of Kshetranath Ghosh was attacked and looted. His family took shelter inside the mills. The police arrived at 4 PM and provided a protection of 20 policemen. Within half an hour there was another attack in the outer compound in which one worker was killed. By the evening about 25,000 Hindus taken shelter in the compound of Lakshminarayan Cotton Mills. The Hindus who took refuge in the mill premises were without food for four days till 20 January. Professor Richard Novak of Notre Dame College went to Narayanganj to take photographs of mass violence. He was stabbed to death at Lakhadgola, near the Adarsha Cotton Mills.

On 14 January, Gosthabihari Saha, a well known businessman of Narayanganj was killed and his printing press Satyasadhana was looted and set on fire. In the village of Panchasar, the miscreants killed Renubala Pain along with her two children and Shobharani Basu along with her two daughters. In the village of Narasinghi, 350 Hindu houses were burnt down. One Bimala Sundari Pal was ruthlessly killed. Sixteen members of the family of Barada Prasad Ray, the Union Board President of Maiman village were killed. All the houses in the Hindu village of Murapara and burnt. Seventeen women were burnt to death. In the village of Bhulta about 250 Hindus were mercilessly killed and seventeen burnt alive.

On 17 February, 623 Hindus were killed in Golakandail Union Council in Rupganj in the Narayanganj sub-division. Some Muslim hooligans attacked Haran Ghosh's house at Ghoshpara, Narsingdi and set fire to it. Thereafter they looted and set fire to all the houses at Ghoshpara, Mudakpara(Kuripara), Baulpara, Paittalpara. Hooligans could not cross C & B road to enter other densely populated Hindu areas surrounding Narsingdi bazar as Muslims, mainly from Tekpara, resisted hooligans. People from disturbed villages took shelter at Narsingdi College building and some privately arranged houses under the care of some influential Muslims. In the Narayanganj sub-division alone about 3,500 Hindus were killed, 300 Hindu women were abducted, 31,000 Hindu dwellings were destroyed as a result of which 80,000 Hindus from 151 villages were rendered homeless.

=== Rajshahi ===
All the Hindu villagers in the village of Mainam near Nagaon in Rajshahi district, except two little girls were massacred. Anti-Hindu violence took place in Durusha, where the Santhals were targeted. In Darsa village under Paba police station 5,000 people were killed. Thousands non-Muslims are taken shelter in a school but brutally it was burnt. And they have buried by digging like pond with banana trees. The riot occurred while DC of Rajshahi was PN Aziz and all Hindus are killed with burnt.

=== Sylhet ===
In Sylhet, the Hindus were forced to close their shops during Ramadan and kirtan was prohibited for 24 hours. In the 35 odd tea gardens of Sylhet, the Hindu workers were pressed to convert to Islam. They were asked to take beef in lieu of mutton. On the day of Eid ul-Fitr, Basudev Sharma, who was considered a guru by thousands of Hindu workers, was forced to take beef.

=== Mymensingh ===
Lands belonging to Garo and Hajong people were grabbed in Nalitabari, Kalmakanda, Durgapur, Haluaghat and Sreebardi areas of the then Mymensingh district.

== Repressive measures ==
On 12 January 1964, the East Pakistan government promulgated the East Pakistan Disturbed Persons (Rehabilitation) Ordinance (I of 1964), that prohibited the sale of immovable property by any Hindu. When the exodus started, the Hindus had no other option but to leave their properties and flee to India. Their assets were subsequently misappropriated by vested quarters of the Muslim leadership. The ordinance was challenged at the Dhaka High Court by Chittaranjan Sutar, where the government of East Pakistan lost the case.

Manoranjan Dhar, an advocate of Dhaka High Court, former Finance Minister of East Pakistan and General Secretary of Pakistan National Congress was arrested from his residence in Mymensingh. Pulin De, a professor, former member of East Pakistan legislative assembly and Secretary of Pakistan Socialist Party was arrested from Dhalghat in Chittagong.

=== Press censorship ===
The press reports were heavily censored in Pakistan. Photography was prohibited. The Pakistan government imposed censorship on The Daily Ittefaq and Pakistan Observer for their unbiased reporting. In protest five dailies of East Pakistan stopped publication. When Reuters reported that over 1,000 people had been killed in Dhaka alone, Pakistan government lodged an immediate protest.

== Exodus ==
Hindu refugees from East Pakistan on their way to Kolkata.

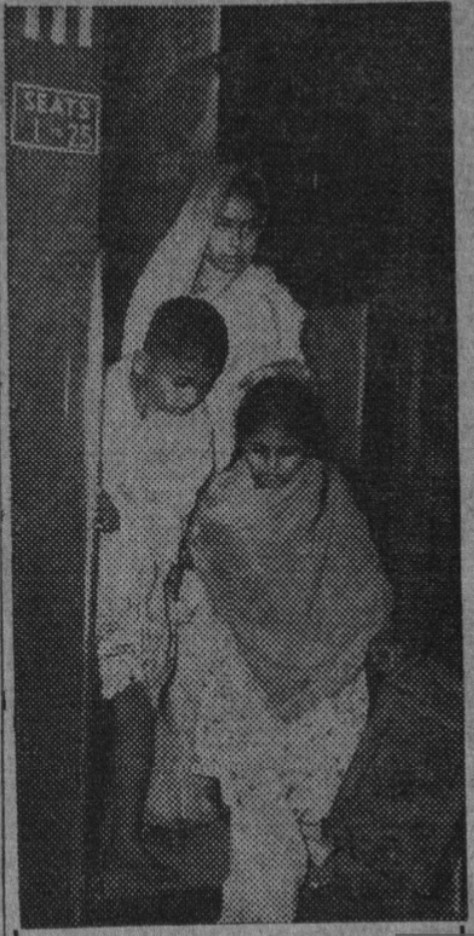
Hindu Refugees reaching Kolkata after 1964 Khulna riots

Thousands of Hindus arrived in India as refugees. Everyday about 5,000 to 6,000 Hindus queued up in front of the Indian embassy in Dhaka to emigrate to India. But only 300 to 400 used to get the permit. As a result of this migration, Khulna, the only Hindu-majority district in East Pakistan became a Muslim-majority district. Large scale influx of Hindu refugees occurred in Jalpaiguri as a result of the oppression on the Indian chitmahals within East Pakistan by the East Pakistan Rifles. On 2 March, The Globe and Mail reported that thousands of Hindus eager to emigrate to India are stranded in Dhaka. According to Indian authorities, an estimated 135,000 Bengali Hindu refugees had arrived in West Bengal. During this time, many of the remaining Hindu residents of Panamnagar left for India.

=== Eviction of tribals ===
Garo refugees from East Pakistan in Garo Hills, Assam, India.

More than 75,000 refugees, of which about 35,000 were Christians, from East Pakistan arrived into Assam within one and half months since the genocide began. The refugees, mostly Garos, Hajongs and Dalus from Mymensingh took refuge in Garo Hills in Assam, now in Meghalaya. The Observer reported that 12 provisional camps have been set up at Tura in the Garo Hills for the 50,000 refugees. Lakshmi Menon, the Deputy Foreign Minister of India stated at the Lok Sabha that a column of 1,000 refugees from Mymensingh had been fired at by the East Pakistan Rifles, while they were crossing over to India. By 28 March, around 78,000 tribal refugees had migrated from Mymensingh District in East Pakistan to present day Meghalaya in India.

The forced migration of the tribal people, especially Christian tribal created a lot of stir in the international community. Realizing the consequences, the Pakistan government made an effort to woo the tribal people back home. The district administration of Mymensingh appealed to the refugees to return. The Archbishop of Dhaka met President Ayub Khan and wrote a letter appealing to the tribal refugees to come back home. The Indian authorities announced the appeal of the Pakistan government and the Archbishop of Dhaka to the refugees in the camps and offered them free transportation to the border. The tribal refugees rejected the appeal and declined to go back to Pakistan.

=== Relief and rehabilitation in India ===
In India, the refugees were provided relief in temporary relief camps in Assam, West Bengal and Tripura. Later they were provided rehabilitation in different parts of India. 6,000 Chakmas were provided shelter at a relief camp in Silchar. 12 provisional camps were set up at Tura in Garo Hills to provide relief to around 50,000 Garos and other tribals from East Pakistan.

== Relief measures in Pakistan ==
In the afternoon of 15 January 1964, around 300 Bengali Hindus of neighbouring area, including women and children took refuge in the house of Swadesh Nag at Hemendra Das Road in Sutrapur, Dhaka. Nag arranged for a meal of rice and lentils for the refugees. Next day, the Government of East Pakistan began shifting the Hindu minorities from the disturbed areas of Dhaka in government trucks into the compound of Dhaka Court. Soon, the court premises were packed to capacity. On 17 January, the government shift many refugees to Jagannath College, where a relief camp had been opened. At the Jagannath College, there were around 7,000 to 10,000 refugees. However, there were no arrangement for latrines. As a result, the condition of the camp soon became unhygienic. The Bengali Hindus of Tantibazar and Shankharibazar fed the refugees at the camp for two days with khichuri. All together 25 relief camps were opened in Dhaka, out of which only one was run by the Government and the rest by private Hindu organizations. A relief camp was opened at Jagannath Hall of Dhaka University where 800 people including three legislators of the East Pakistan assembly took shelter. According to local newspapers there were around 50,000 to 80,000 Hindus in the 20 relief camps by last week of January. By 28 March the situation had calmed.

The violence against the minority Bengali Hindus in East Pakistan put a section of the educated Muslims to shame. During this time, some Muslim leaders of East Pakistan like Ataur Rahaman Khan, Sheikh Mujibur Rahman, Mamud Ali, Zalur Hossain and Tofazzal Hossain visited the refugee camps.

== Depiction in culture ==
Amitav Ghosh's 1988 English novel, The Shadow Lines, has the riots as the underlying theme. Across Borders by Shuvashree Ghosh also has the riots as the underlying theme. Chhimchhangar Duta Par, a 1965 Assamese novel by Umakanta Sharma has the persecution and subsequent exodus of Garos from East Pakistan during the riots as the central theme. Chitra Nadir Pare, a 1999 Bengali film by Bangladeshi filmmaker Tanvir Mokammel, has the riots in the backdrop.

== See also ==
- Persecution of Hindus in Bangladesh
- Freedom of religion in Bangladesh
