= Sayyid Meerak Shah Kashani =

Sufi Spiritual leader in Jammu and Kashmir

Sufi; Faqir e Millat; Sayyid Meerak Shah Kashani
- سید میرک شاہ کاشأنی
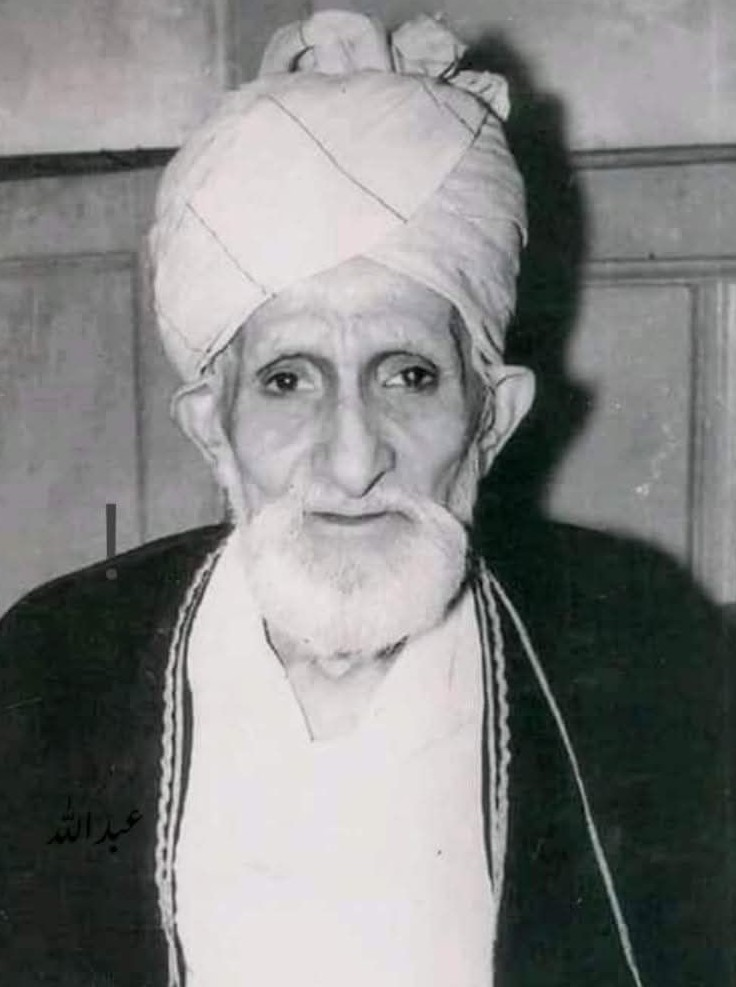
- Sayyid Meerak Shah Kasani c.20th C.E
- Title: Faqir-e-Milat

Personal life
- Born: 6 September 1895 Saraf Kadal, Srinagar
- Died: 13 December 1971 (24th Shawwal) Shalimar Srinagar
- Resting place: Khanqah-i-Kashani Shalimar
- Parent: Sayyid Ahmad Shah Kashani
- Education: Anjuman Tableeg Ul Islam, Madinat Ul Uloum
- Pen name: Mirak~

Religious life
- Religion: Islam
- Denomination: Sunni
- Founder of: Anjuman Tableeg Ul Islam
- Tariqa: Qadiriyya, Kubrawiyya, Naqshbandi, Suhrawardiyya, Chisti

Muslim leader
- Influenced by: Mir Sayyid Ali Hamadani
- Influenced: Allama Shah Bukhari, Peer Yaseen Sahib(Syed Mohammad Yaseen Shah), Molvi Abdul Kabir

Sayyid Meerakh Shah Kashani (Urdu: سید میرک شاہ کاشانی; 6 September 1895 – 13 December 1971), also known as Faqir-i-Milat, was a Kashmiri Sufi poet and spiritual teacher active during the late nineteenth centuries. He was associated with Sufi teaching and community service in Kashmir.

Kashani was known for his poetry, religious instruction, and spiritual leadership. His teachings addressed themes of devotion, ethics, and spiritual discipline, he attracted follows within Kashmir and beyond. He was regarded by his followers as a respected Sufi saint, and his work influenced aspects of the region's religious and cultural life.

== Early life and education ==
Mirakh Shah Kashani was born on 6 September 1895 in Saraf Kadal, Srinagar, Jammu and Kashmir, to Sayyid Ahmed Shah Naqash. His mother died when he was two years old, and his father died three years later. He did not receive formal secular education beyond instruction in the Qur'an, Hadith, and some Persian literature. According to some accounts, when further formal education was proposed, he declined and instead spent time in the company of fakirs, saints and Qalandars.

It is reported that his ancestor, Sayyid Habibullah Kashani, migrated from Kashan, a city in Isfahan, Iran. Family tradition traces his lineage to the Prophet Muhammad صلى الله تعالى عليه وآله وسلم through Mir Sayyid Ali Hamadani رحمه الله.

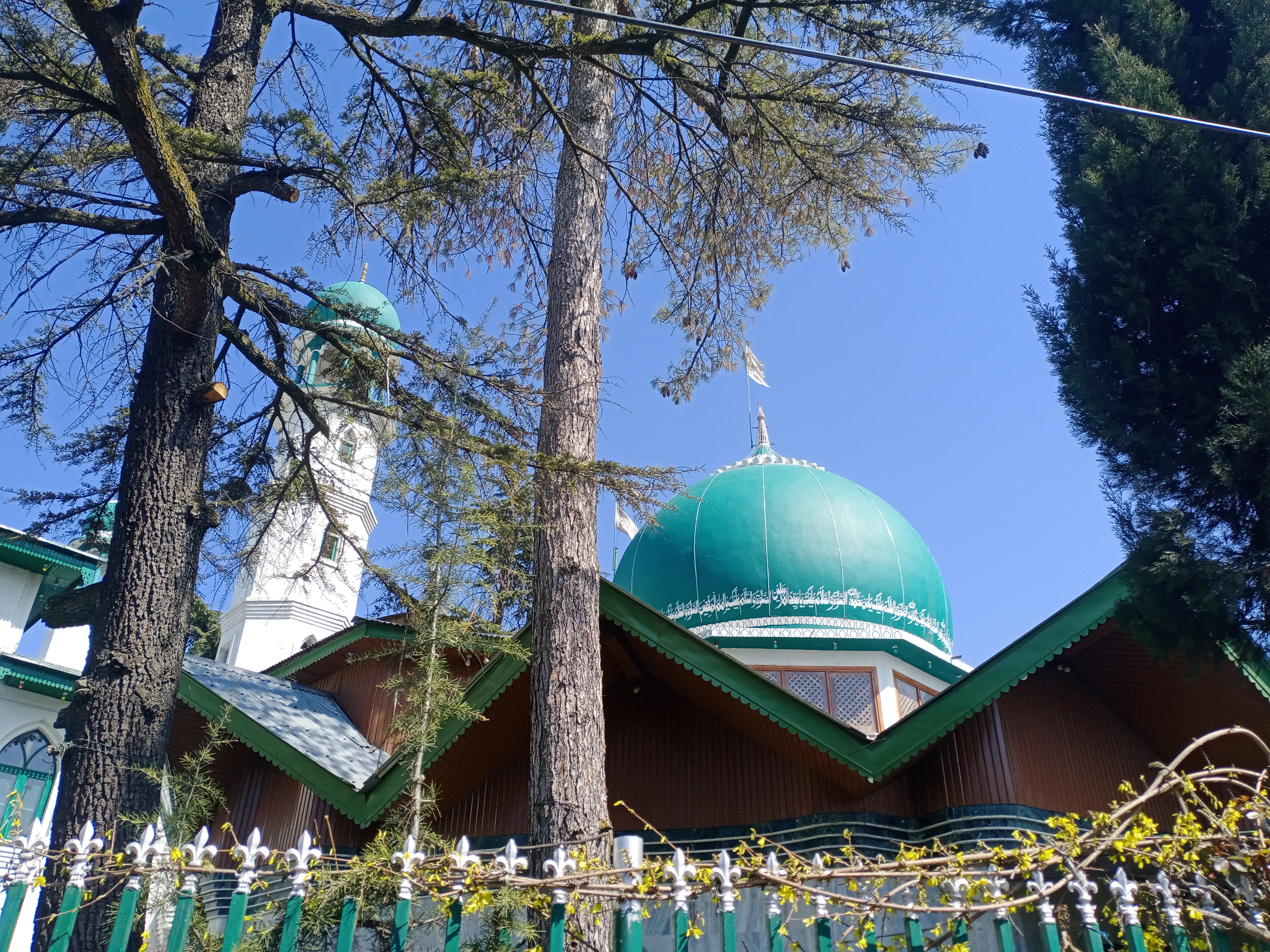
Shrine of Sayyid Meerakh Shah Kashani at Shalimar Srinagar

Kashani later engaged in the calligraphy of Qur'anic verses, which he used as a means of financial support for himself and his disciples.

The shrine of Sayyid Meerakh Shan Kashani is located at Shalimar in Srinagar.

== Death and burial ==
Sayyid Meerakh Shah Kashani died on 13 December 1971 (24 Shawwal 1391 AH), three days before the end of the Indo-Pakistani War of 1971, at the age of 76. He was buried at Shalimar Bagh, Srinagar, at a site known as Khanqah-i-Kashaniyah, near the graves of his predecessors, Abdul Qadoos and Laal Shah Sahib.

His annual urs is observed on 24 Shawwal in accordance with the Islamic calendar.

== Works ==
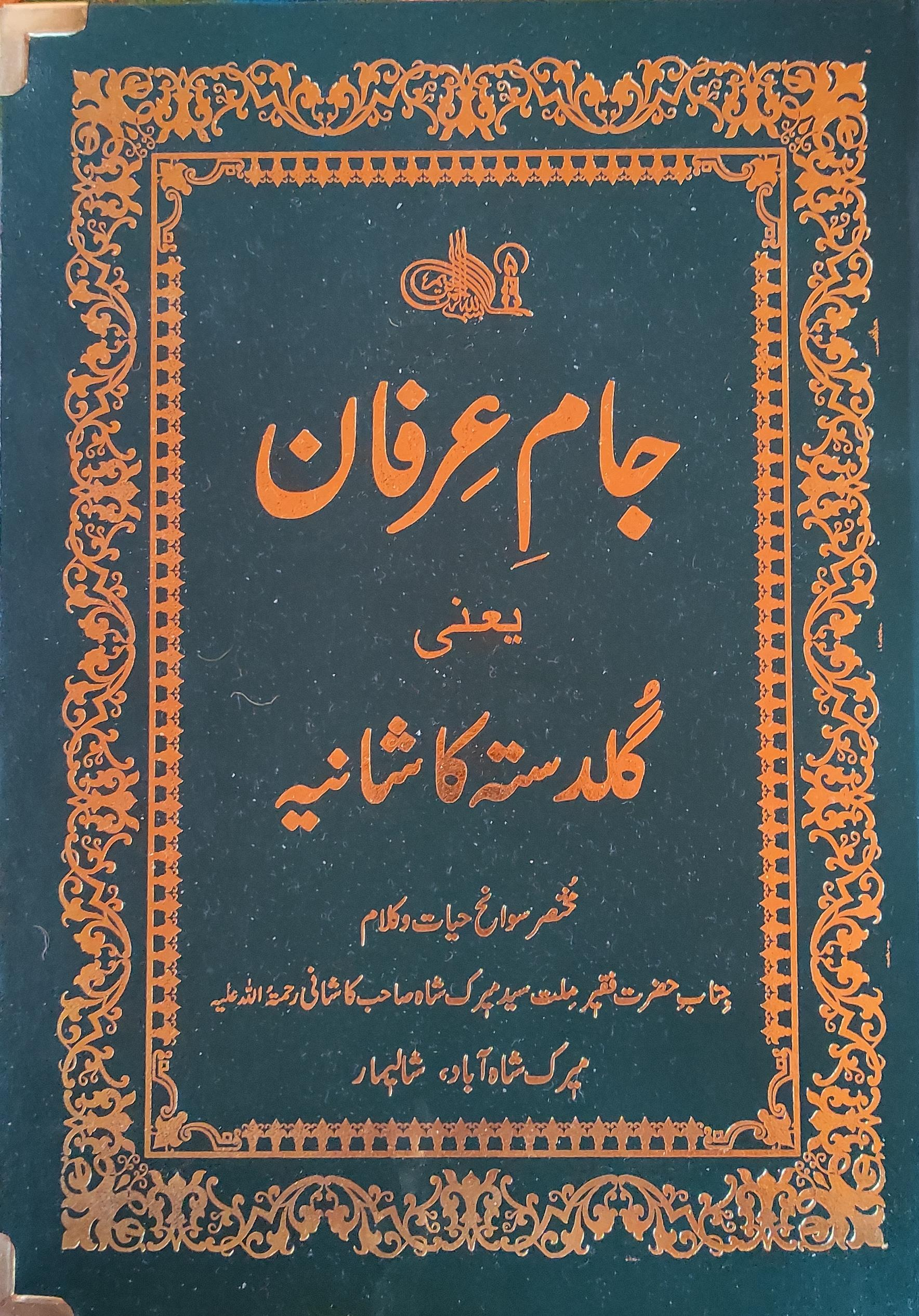
Jaam e Irfan written by Sayyid Meerakh Shah Kashani.

• Jaam-e-Irfan (Goblet Of Knowledge), a poetry collection published by Khanqah-i-Kashaniyah; its second edition was published in 2008.

== See also ==
- Abdul Qadir Gilani
- Jalaluddin Surkh-Posh Bukhari
- Mir Sayyid Ali Hamadani
