= Hazratbal Shrine =

Muslim shrine in Srinagar, Jammu and Kashmir, India

- درگاہ حضرت بل
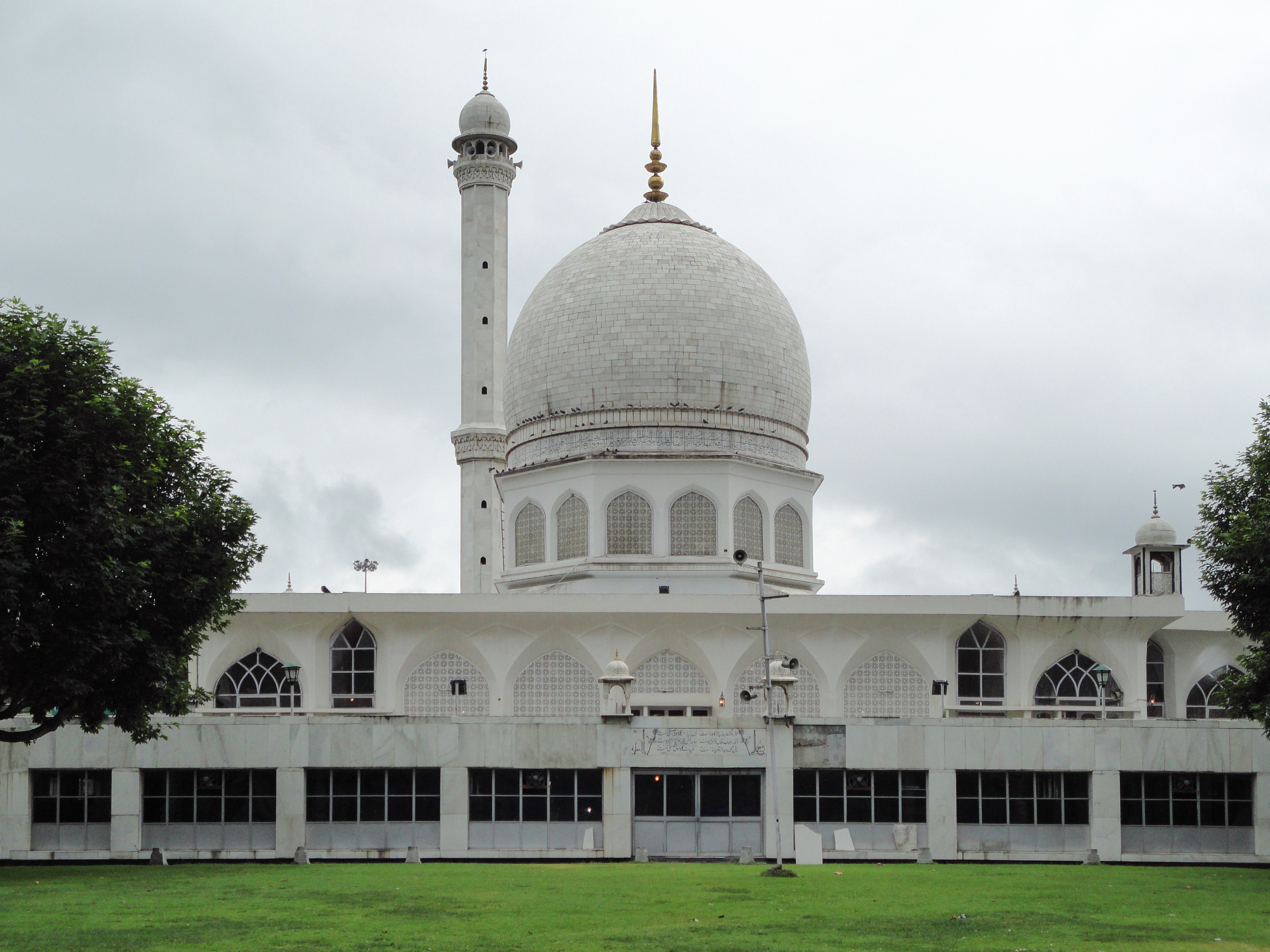
- The shrine in 2010

- Location of the mosque and dargah in Jammu and Kashmir

Religion
- Affiliation: Islam
- Region: Kashmir Valley
- Rite: Sufi
- Ecclesiastical or organisational status: Mosque and dargah
- Status: Active

Location
- Location: Hazratbal, Srinagar, Srinagar District, Jammu and Kashmir
- Country: India
- Interactive map of Hazratbal Shrine
- Administration: Jammu and Kashmir Muslim Waqf Board
- Coordinates: 34°7′45″N 74°50′32″E

Architecture
- Type: Mosque architecture
- Style: Islamic
- Completed: 1634 (first structure); 1979 (expansion)

Specifications
- Length: 105 metres (344 ft)
- Width: 25 metres (82 ft)
- Dome: One
- Minaret: One

The Hazratbal Shrine, also known as Dargah Hazratbal, is a Sufi dargah and mosque located in Hazratbal area of Srinagar, in the union territory of Jammu and Kashmir, India. The shrine houses the Moi-e-Muqqadas, a relic traditionally believed to be a hair strand of the Islamic Prophet Muhammad. The shrine is situated on the northern bank of Dal Lake in Srinagar and is regarded by many Muslims as the holiest Islamic religious sites in Kashmir.

== Etymology ==
The name of the shrine is a combination of the Arabic word hazrat (lit. 'respected') and the Kashmiri word bal (lit. 'place').

== History ==
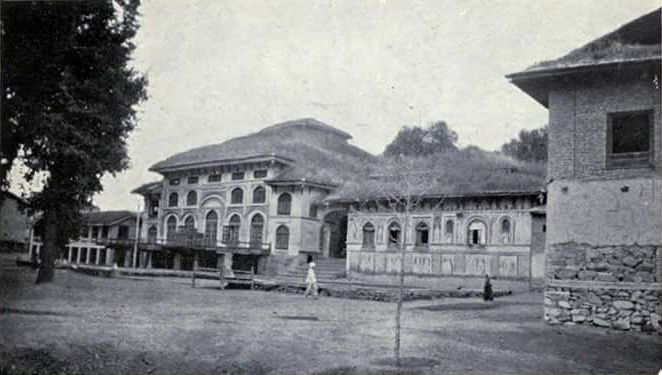
The Hazratbal shrine in 1917

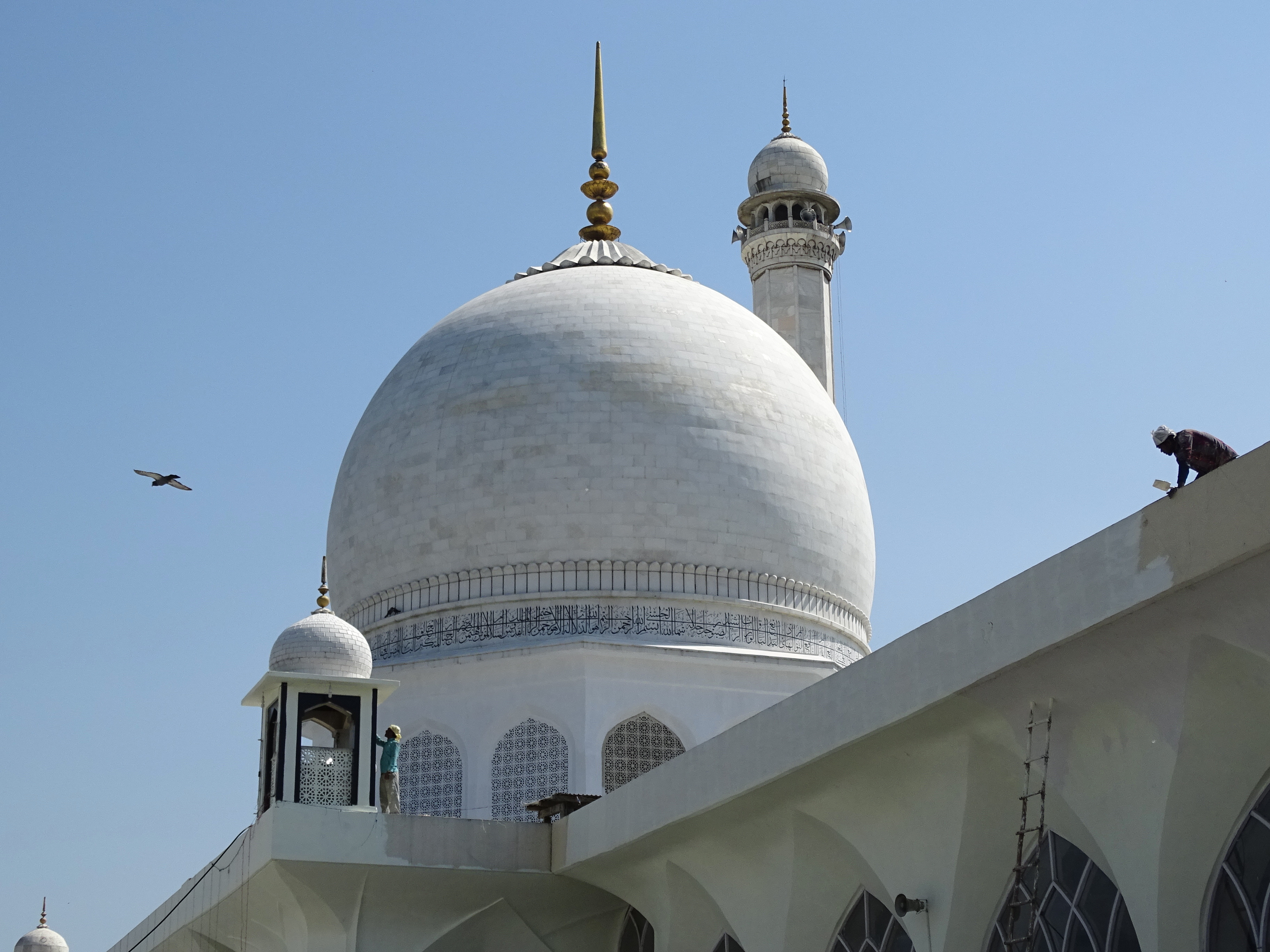
The dome and minaret were added to the structure during its reconstruction in the 1970s

The Hazratbal Shrine was established under the patronage of Inayat Begum, the daughter of Khwaja Nur-ud-Din Eshai, who served as the custodian of the relic. The earliest structure on the site was constructed in 17th century by Mughal subedar Sadiq Khan during the reign of Emperor Shah Jahan. The building was initially called Ishrat Jahan and was converted into a prayer hall in 1634 on the orders of Shah Jahan. Construction of the present day structure began in 1968 and took 11 years to complete, finishing in 1979.

According to tradition, the relic was first brought to Kashmir by Syed Abdullah Madani, who is described as a descendant of the Islamic Prophet Muhammad. Abdullah Madani left Medina and settled in Bijapur in Southern Indian in 1635, during the period of Mughal expansion. Following his death, the relic was inherited by his son Syed Hameed. After the Mughal conquest of the region, Hameed reportedly lost his estates and transferred custody of the relic to Khwaja Nur-ud-Din Eshai, a Kashmiri merchant.

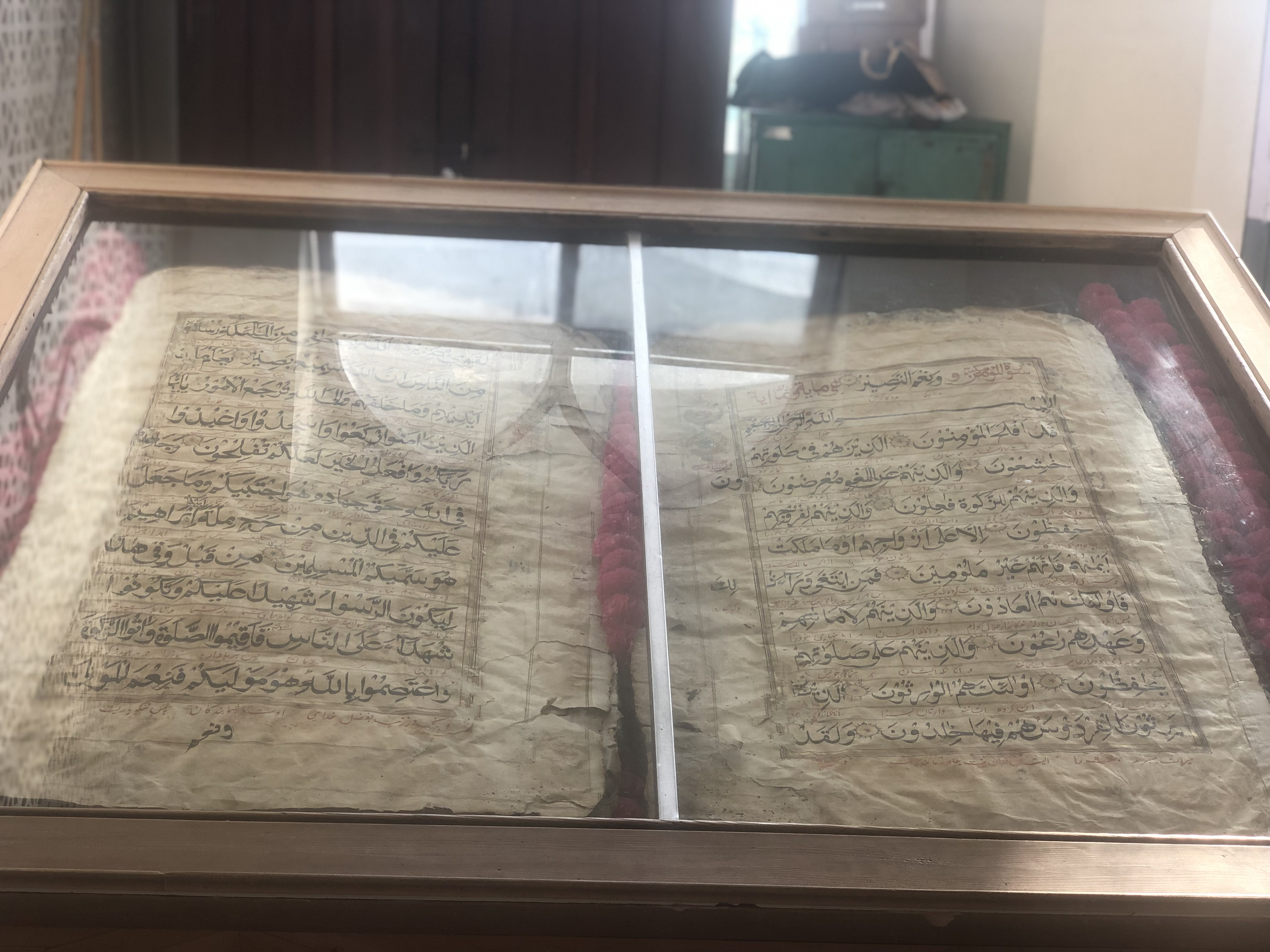
A copy of the Quran written by Mughal Emperor, Aurangzeb in Hazratbal Shrine.

Mughal emperor Aurangzeb, upon learning the relic's existence, ordered it to be taken to Ajmer and placed at the shrine of the Sufi saint Mu'in al-Din Chishti, while Eshai was imprisoned in Delhi. Some later traditional accounts state that Aurangzeb subsequently ordered the relic to be sent back to Kashmir after experiencing a dream in which he saw the Islamic prophet Muhammad along with the four Rashidun caliphs. According to these accounts, the dream prompted him to reverse his earlier decision and allow the relic to be returned. Although Aurangzeb is said to have permitted Khwaja Nur-ud-Din Eshai to take the relic to Kashmir, Eshai had died while imprisoned in Delhi. By around 1700, the relic was transported to Kashmir along with Eshai's remains. There, Inayat Begum, the daughter of Eshai, became the custodian of the relic and established the Hazratbal Shrine. Custodianship of the relic has since remained with her male descendants, who belong to what is known as the Banday family. As of 2019, the relic was under the care of Manzoor Banday, Ishaq Banday and Mohiuddin Banday. The relic is displayed for public view only on special Islamic occasions, including celebrations associated with the birth of the Islamic prophet Muhammad (Mawlid) and his four principal companions.

=== 1963 relic disappearance episode ===
The Moi-e-Muqqadas was reported missing from the Hazratbal shrine on 27 December 1963. Its disappearance prompted widespread protests across Jammu and Kashmir, with large demonstrations reported in multiple locations. On 31 December, Indian Prime Minister Jawaharlal Nehru addressed the nation regarding the incident and sent a team from the Central Bureau of Investigation into Jammu and Kashmir to probe the suspected theft.

The relic was recovered by Indian authorities on 4 January 1964. According to official accounts, its recovery involved the participation of Sayyid Meerak Shah Kashani and others, who stated that they were able to identify the relic based on prior familiarity. The relic was subsequently examined by its caretakers, as well as by investigative teams of the Government of Jammu and Kashmir, who concluded that it was authentic. A public viewing of the relic was held on 6 February 1964, coinciding with commemorations associated with Ali bin Abi Talib. During and after the investigation, some allegations circulated claiming that the relic had been deliberately removed for political reasons, although such claims were not substantiated by official findings.

The incident contributed to heightened communal tensions, leading to unrest in the Indian state of West Bengal and East Pakistan (present-day Bangladesh). These events resulted in a significant movement of refugees into India, with estimates placing the number at approximately 200,000 between December 1963 and February 1964.

=== Reconstruction ===
During the 1970s, the earlier shrine, characterised by a thatched roof and vernacular Kashmiri architecture style, was reconstructed in marble and redesigned with Mughal-inspired elements, including the addition of a dome and minaret. The reconstruction took place under the leadership of Sheikh Abdullah. Some scholars and commentators have interpreted the project as part of broader efforts by his administration to reinforce political legitimacy following the Indira–Sheikh Accord.

A ₹45-crore beautification and development project was later undertaken by the Jammu & Kashmir Waqf Board and funded through the PRASAD (Pilgrimage Rejuvenation and Spiritual Augmentation Drive) scheme. The project was sanctioned in 2014–15, formally launched in 2017 by then Chief Minister Mehbooba Mufti, and key components were inaugurated by Prime Minister Narendra Modi in March 2024. The initiative incorporated traditional Kashmiri craftmanship, including khatamband woodwork and calligraphy, alongside modern amenities such as air-conditioning, digital sound systems, and expanded facilities for visitors and pilgrims.

=== Vandalism of a dedication plaque ===
Shortly after the shrine's reopening during Eid Milad-un-Nabi, on 5 September 2025, a plaque featuring the Indian National Emblem was vandalized by some visitors, who reportedly objected to its presence within the mosque. Following a review of CCTV footage, police detained 26 alleged vandals in connection with the incident.

The incident led to increased security measures around the shrine and sparked political controversy. Opposition leaders, including Omar Abdullah, questioned the decision to install a national emblem within a mosque, while the chairperson of the Jammu and Kashmir Waqf Board, Darakhshan Andrabi, condemned the vandalism as a “terrorist attack” and called for strict action against those responsible. Union Minister Kiren Rijiju and several other national leaders appealed for calm, emphasizing the shrine's significance as a religious site and symbol of communal harmony.

== Gallery ==
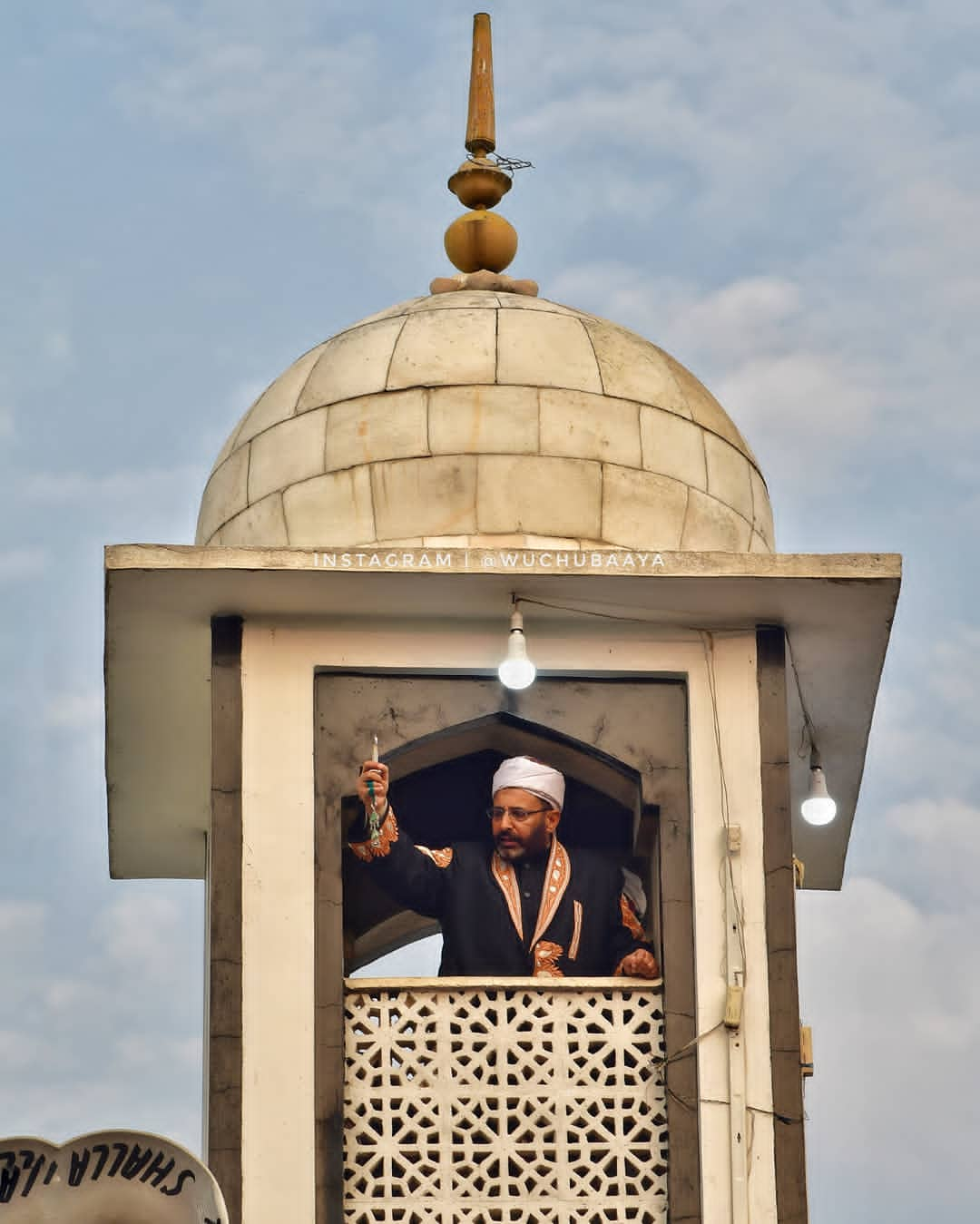
The head cleric displaying the hair on Mawlid in 2018

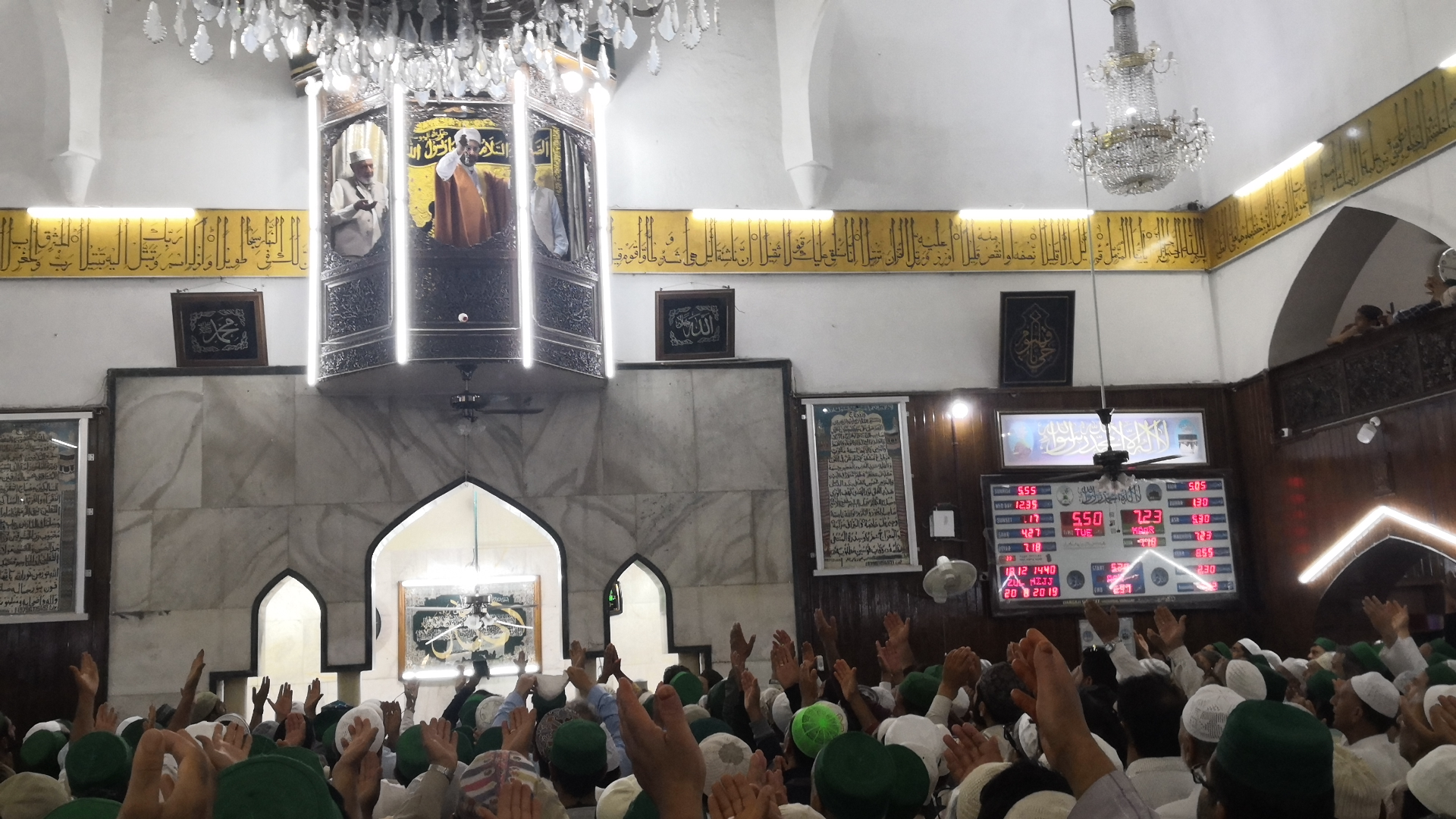
The head cleric displaying the relic inside the mosque in 2019

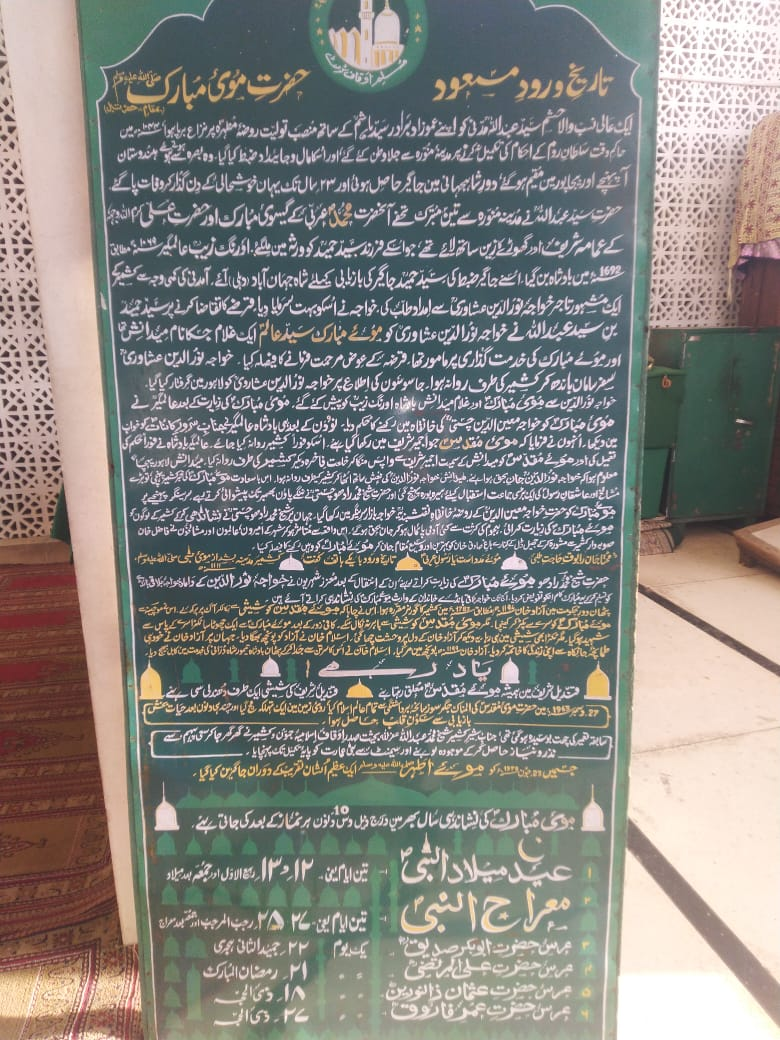
History of Moi-e-Muqaddas in the Hazratbal Shrine

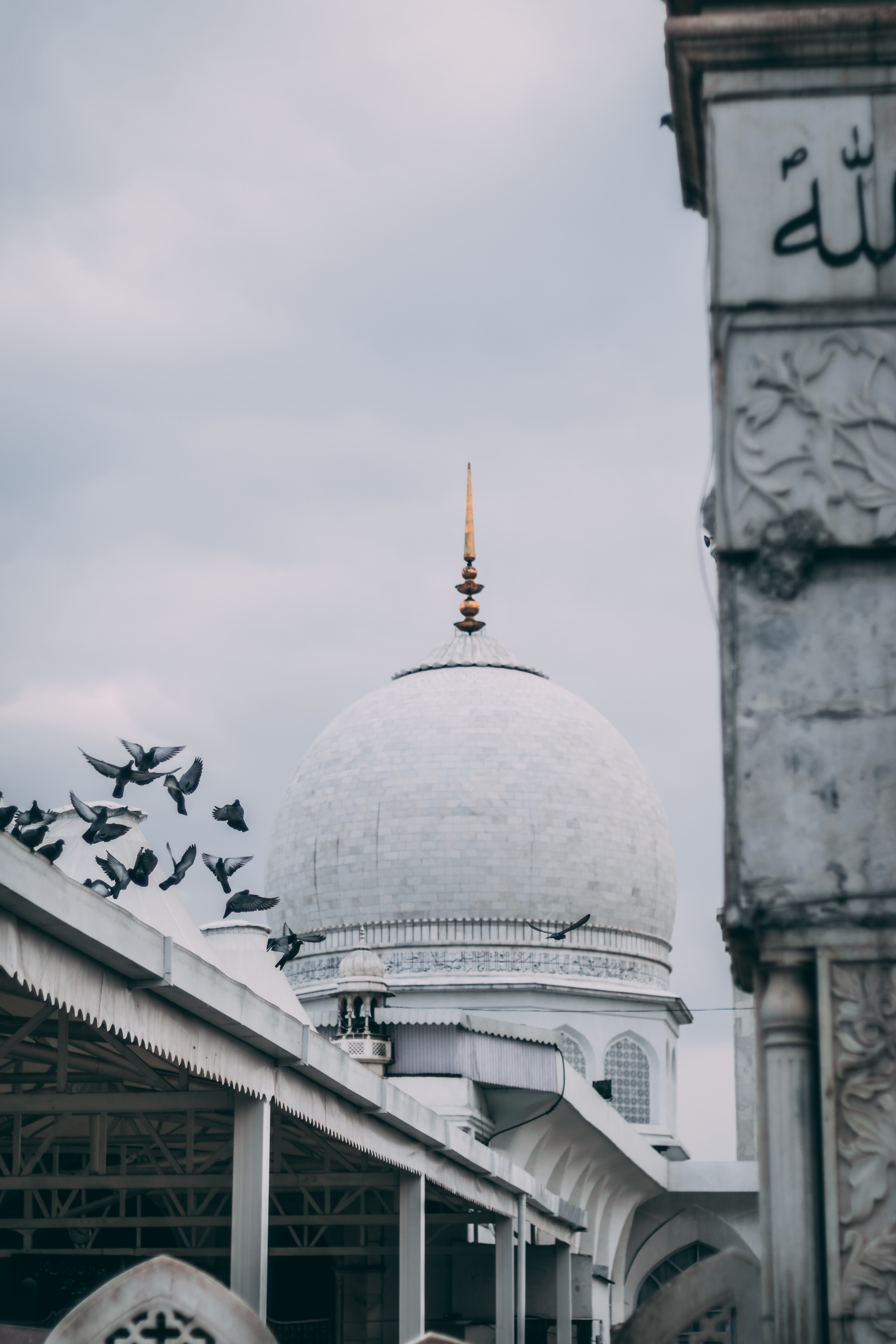
View of the dome from the northern gate

== See also ==
- Kashmir conflict
- Islam in India
- List of mosques in India
