= Indian White Paper on Jammu and Kashmir =

The Indian Government published a White Paper on Jammu and Kashmir in 1948 in an effort to explain the Indian position on the Kashmir dispute. It allegedly contains numerous references to the issue of holding free and impartial plebiscite in Kashmir under the auspices of the United Nations.
