= List of Kashmiri tribes =

Kashmiri livelihood, kinship and descent is one of the major concepts of Kashmiri cultural anthropology. Hindu Kashmiris and Muslim Kashmiris living in the Kashmir Valley of Jammu and Kashmir region of India, Pakistan and China are from the same ethnic stock. Kashmir is home to a variety of tribes, each with its distinct traditions, customs, and way of life. These tribes, often tied to specific regions within Kashmir, have historically played key roles in the social and cultural fabric of the area. While some of them have migrated to different regions of the Indian subcontinent, the tribes of Kashmir still have unique languages, social structures, and professions that contribute to the rich cultural diversity of the region.

== Kashmiri tribes/castes ==
- Bhat/Butt
- Mir
- Zargar
- Kumar/Kral/Kumhar
- Dhar/Dar
- Drabu
- Lone
- Suìf or Sofi
- Malik
- Sheikh
- Kaul
- Raina
- Kak
- Kaw
- Pattu/Pattoo
- Kachru
- Kichlu
- Mantu/Mantoo/Mintoo
- Nahar/Nehru
- Khan
- Fotedar
- Haksar
- Handoo
- Wali
- Tantray
- Parray
- Parimoo
- Mattoo
- Naqashbandi
- Pandit
- Khawaja
- Rajguru
- Badakhshi
- Bhan
- Bazaz
- Andrabi
- Bakshi/Bakhshi
- Rather
- Razdan
- Munshi
- Sapru
- Shah
- Thussu
- Tikoo
- Zutshi
- Magre/Magray
- Yatoo
- Ganaie
- Wanchoo
- Wazir
- Madan
- Wani/Wyne/Wain
- Nengud/Nengroo
- Geelani/Gilani
- Chak

== See also ==
- Kashmiris
- Kashmiri diaspora
- Kashmiri Muslims
- Kashmiri Pandit
- Kashmiris of Punjab
- List of Kashmiris
- Dynasties of ancient Kashmir
- History of Jammu and Kashmir
