= Kashmiris =

Indo-Aryan ethnolinguistic group

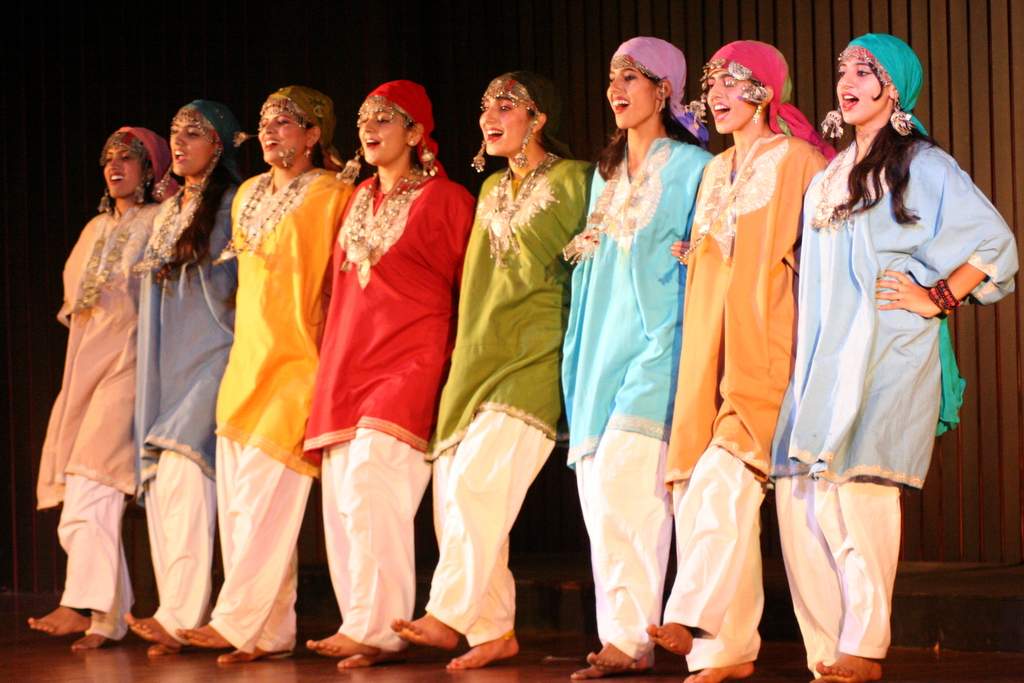
- Kashmiri women performing the Rouf dance at a festival in New Delhi, India, 2011

Regions with significant populations
- India: 6,797,587 (Jammu and Kashmir (1952–2019), (2011)*
- Pakistan: 155,088 (Punjab, 2023)*; 132,450 (Azad Kashmir, 1998)*

Languages
- Kashmiri, Urdu

Religion
- Majority: Islam(75%) (Sunni majority, Shia minority); Minority: Hinduism (22%)

Related ethnic groups
- Other Indo-Aryan peoples
- *The population figures are only for the number of speakers of the Kashmiri language. May not include ethnic Kashmiris who no longer speak the Kashmiri language.

Kashmiri people (Kashmiri pronunciation: [kəːʃirʲ]) are an Indo-Aryan ethnolinguistic group speaking the Kashmiri language and originating from the Kashmir Valley in Indian-administered Jammu and Kashmir.

== Ruling history ==
The earliest known Neolithic sites in the Kashmir Valley are from around 3000 BCE, of which Burzahom is the most significant. These sites provide evidence of early human settlement, including dwellings, tools and domesticated animals. During the later Vedic period, the Uttara–Kurus tribe settled in Kashmir.

During the Ashoka reign (304–232 BCE), Kashmir became part of the Maurya Empire and the city of Srinagari (Srinagar) was built. Kashmir was later conquered by Kanishka, an emperor from the Kushan dynasty. In the eighth century, during the Karkota Empire, Kashmir grew as an imperial power. Lalitaditya Muktapida defeated Yashovarman of Kanyakubja and conquered the eastern kingdoms of Magadha, Kamarupa, Gauda, and Kalinga, he also defeated the Arabs in Sindh. Later came the Utpala dynasty, founded by Avantivarman, which was followed by the Karkotas dynasty. In the latter half of the 10th century, Queen Didda, a descendant of the Hindu Shahis of Udabhandapura on her mother's side, took over as ruler. After her death in 1003 CE, the Lohara dynasty ruled the region.

In 1339, Shah Mir became the ruler of Kashmir, establishing the Shah Mir dynasty, which brought Islam to the Kashmir region. From 1586 to 1751, the Mughal Empire ruled Kashmir, followed by the Afghan Durrani Empire which ruled from 1747 until 1819. The Sikhs, under Ranjit Singh, annexed Kashmir in 1819. In 1846, after the First Anglo-Sikh War, the Treaty of Lahore was signed and upon the purchase of the region from the British under the Treaty of Amritsar, the King of Jammu, Gulab Singh, became ruler of Kashmir. Thereafter, the Dogra dynasty ruled under the British Crown until 1947, when the princely state of Jammu and Kashmir joined India. The region became a disputed territory the same year, administered by three countries, India, Pakistan, and China. The Kashmir Valley, from where Kashmiris originate, lies in the Indian-administered portion of the region.

== Geographic distribution ==
There are about 6.8 million speakers of Kashmiri and related dialects in Jammu and Kashmir and amongst the Kashmiri diaspora in other states of India. Most Kashmiris are located in the Kashmir Valley and other areas of Jammu and Kashmir. In the Kashmir Valley, they form a majority.

Kashmiri is spoken by roughly five per cent of Azad Kashmir's population. According to the 1998 Pakistan Census, there were 132,450 Kashmiri speakers in Azad Kashmir. Native speakers of the language were dispersed in "pockets" throughout Azad Kashmir, particularly in the districts of Muzaffarabad (15%), Neelam (20%) and Hattian (15%), with very small minorities in Haveli (5%) and Bagh (2%). The Kashmiri spoken in Muzaffarabad is distinct from, although still intelligible with, the Kashmiri of the Neelam Valley to the north. In Neelam Valley, Kashmiri is the second most widely spoken language and the majority language in at least a dozen or so villages, where in about half of these, it is the sole mother tongue. The Kashmiri dialect of Neelam is closer to the variety spoken in northern Kashmir Valley, particularly Kupwara. At the 2017 Census of Pakistan, as many as 350,000 people declared their first language to be Kashmiri.

A process of language shift is observable among Kashmiri-speakers in Azad Kashmir according to linguist Tariq Rahman, as they gradually adopt local dialects such as Pahari-Pothwari, Hindko or move towards the lingua franca Urdu. This has resulted in these languages being used more than Kashmiri. There have been calls for the promotion of Kashmiri at an official level; in 1983, a Kashmiri Language Committee was set up by the government to patronise Kashmiri and impart it in school-level education. However, the limited attempts at introducing the language have not been successful, and it is Urdu, rather than Kashmiri, that Kashmiri Muslims have seen as their identity symbol. Rahman notes that efforts to organise a Kashmiri language movement have been challenged by the scattered nature of the Kashmiri-speaking community in Azad Kashmir.

== Language ==
The Kashmiri language is one of the 22 scheduled languages of India. It was a part of the eighth Schedule in the former Constitution of the Jammu and Kashmir. Along with other regional languages mentioned in the Sixth Schedule, as well as Hindi and Urdu, the Kashmiri language was to be developed in the state.

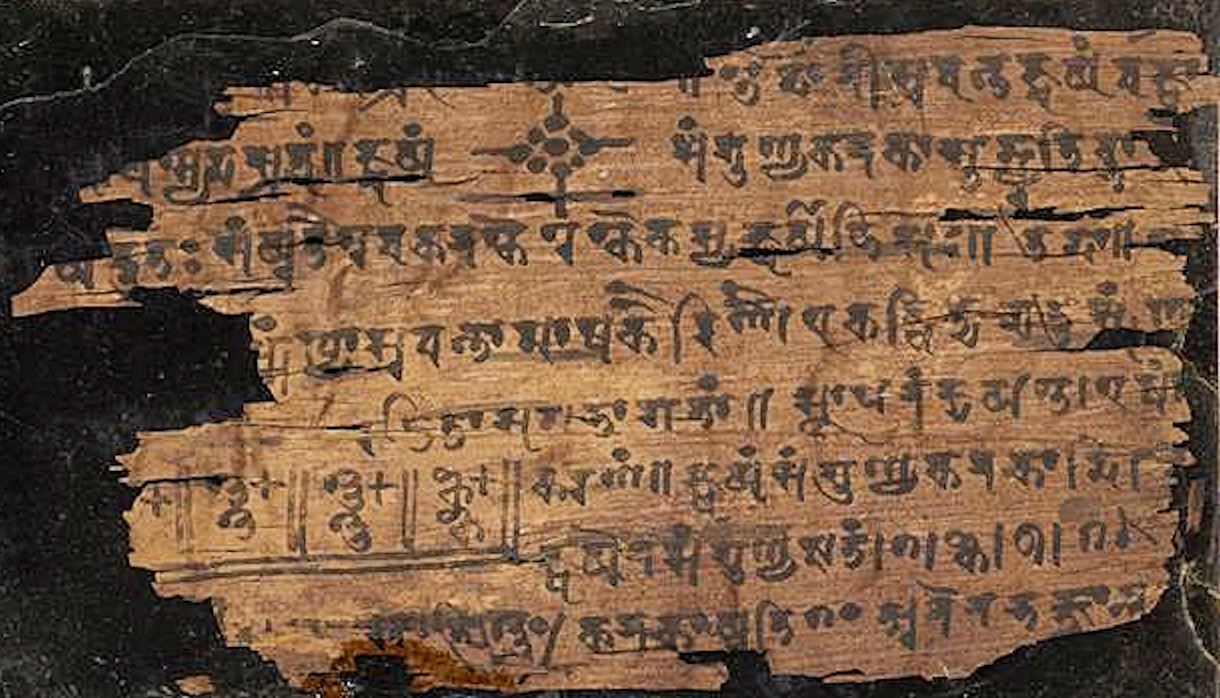
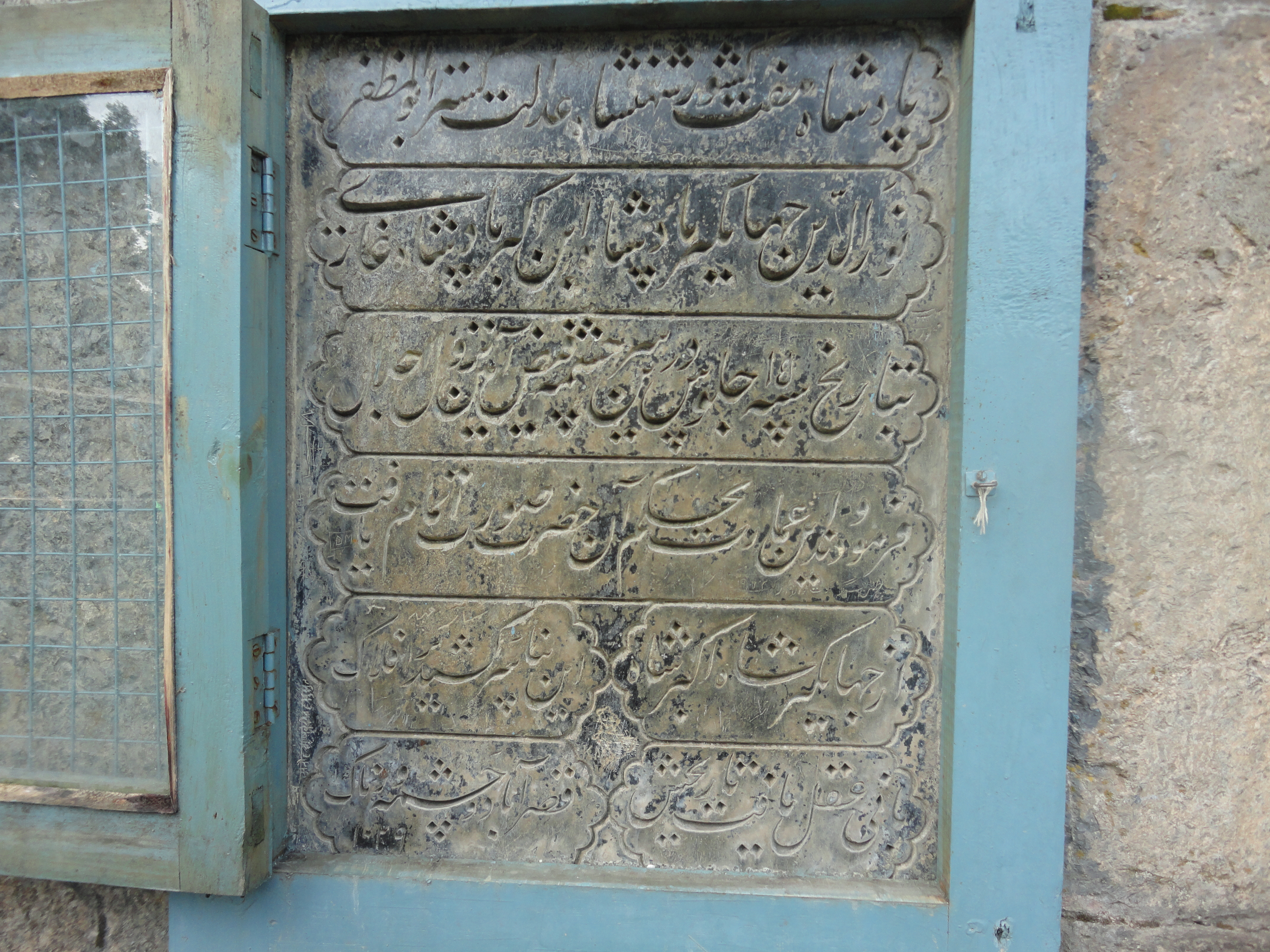
An example of early Sharada script in the Bakhshali manuscript (left); Stone Slab in Verinag in Perso-Arabic script (right)

Persian began to be used as the court language in Kashmir during the 14th century, under the influence of Islam. It was replaced by Urdu in 1889 during the Dogra rule. In 2020, Kashmiri became an official language in the Union Territory of Jammu and Kashmir for the first time.

Kashmiri is closely related to Poguli and Kishtwari, which are spoken in the mountains to the south of the Kashmir Valley and have sometimes been counted as dialects of Kashmiri.

== Krams (surnames) ==
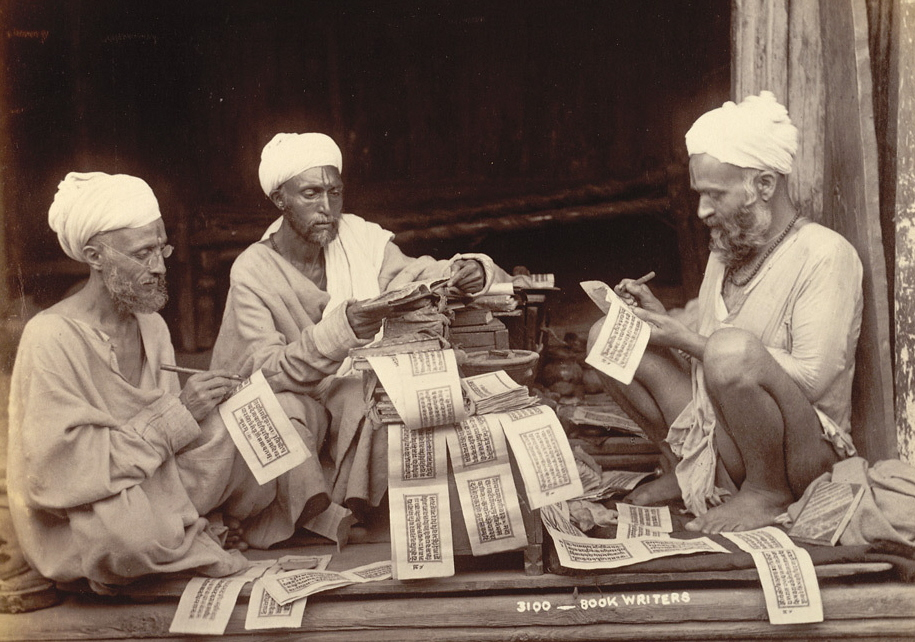
Kashmiri Hindu priests in the 1890s

Kashmiri Hindus are Saraswat Brahmins and are known by the exonym Pandit. The Muslims living in Kashmir are of the same stock as the Kashmiri Pandit community and are designated as Kashmiri Muslims. Kashmiri Muslims are descended from Kashmiri Hindus who converted to Islam, and Kashmiri Pandits are the predecessors of the Kashmiri Muslims, who now form the majority population in the Kashmir Valley Both the Kashmiri Hindus and Muslim society reckons descent patrilineally. Certain property and titles may be inherited through the male line, but certain inheritances may accrue through the female line. After Kashmiri Hindus converted to Islam they largely retained their family names (kram) which indicated their original profession, locality or community. These include:

- Bhat, Bhatt or Butt
- Dhar/Dar
- Pandit
- Kaul
- Raina
- Kak
- Kachru
- Kichlu
- Mantu/Mantoo/Mintoo
- Fotedar
- Haksar
- Handoo
- Parimoo
- Mattoo
- Rajguru
- Bhan
- Bazaz
- Bakshi
- Rather
- Razdan
- Munshi
- Sapru
- Thussu
- Tikoo
- Zutshi
- Magre/Magray
- Yatoo
- Wali
- Wanchoo
- Wazir
- Madan
- Wani
- Lone
- Mir
- Ganai
- Tantray
- Parray

== Culture ==
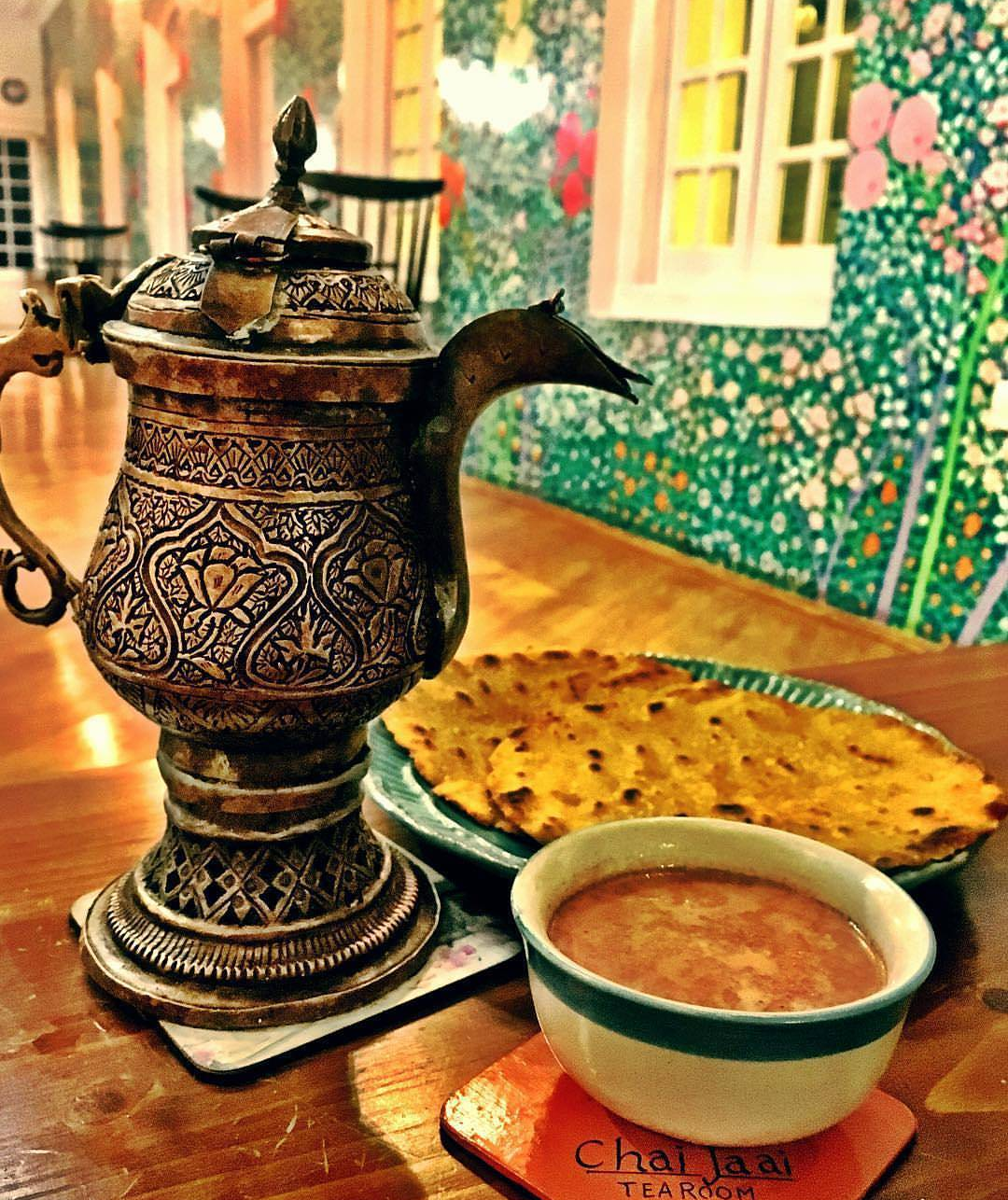
Kashmiri Samovar and Noon Chai

=== Music ===
The traditional types of music of Kashmir are Sufi Kalam, Wanvun, Chakri, Henzae, and Ladishah.

Some of the musical instruments used in Kashmir are Rubab, Tumbaknaer (which is of Iranian origin) and Santoor.

A traditional dance form usually performed by women on occasions like marriages and similar social functions is Rouf.

=== Cuisine ===
Meat and rice are popular food items among Kashmiris, rice being considered a staple food.

Noon Chai or Sheer Chai and Kahweh are beverages of Kashmir.

Wazwan is a multi-course meal in Kashmir prepared by skilled chefs called Wazas.

Kashmir is also known for its baking traditions. Sheermal, Bakarkhani (puff pastry), Lavas (unleavened bread), Tsochwor (hard, bagel-shaped bread) and Kulche are popular baked goods.

== See also ==
- List of Kashmiris
- Kashmiri diaspora
- Kashmiri Hindus
- Kashmiri Shaikh
- Literature of Kashmir
- Kashmiriyat
- 1931 Kashmir agitation
- 1941 Census of Jammu and Kashmir
- Kashmir conflict
- All Parties Hurriyat Conference
- Elections in Jammu and Kashmir
- Theory of Kashmiri descent from lost tribes of Israel

== Bibliography ==
=== Encyclopedia ===
- Amin, Tahir; Schofield, Victoria (2009), "Kashmir", in John L. Esposito (ed.), The Oxford Encyclopedia of Islamic World, ISBN 978-0-19-530513-5
- Khan, Nyla Ali. Kashmir. The Oxford Encyclopedia of Islam and Women.
- West, Barbara (2010), Encyclopedia of the Peoples of Asia and Oceania, Infobase, ISBN 978-1-4381-1913-7

=== Scholarly books ===
- Ames, Frank (1986). The Kashmir shawl and its Indo-French influence. Antique Collectors' Club. ISBN 9780907462620.
- Bhat, M. Ashraf (2017), The Changing Language Roles and Linguistic Identities of the Kashmiri Speech Community, Cambridge Scholars Publishing, ISBN 978-1-4438-6260-8
- Bose, Sumantra (2013), Transforming India, Harvard University Press, ISBN 978-0-674-72819-6
- Brower, Barbara; Johnston, Barbara Rose (2016). Disappearing Peoples?: Indigenous Groups and Ethnic Minorities in South and Central Asia. Routledge. ISBN 978-1-3154-3039-3.
- C. Baron V. Hugel, Annotated By D.C. Sharma (1984). Kashmir Under Maharaja Ranjit Singh. Atlantic Publishers & Distributors Pvt Ltd. ISBN 9788171560943.
- Chowdhary, Rekha (2015), Jammu and Kashmir: Politics of Identity and Separatism, Routledge, ISBN 978-1-317-41405-6
- Chen, Yu-Wen; Shih, Chih-Yu (2016), Borderland Politics in Northern India, Routledge, ISBN 978-1-317-60517-1
- Drace-Francis, Alex, European Identity: A Historical Readered. European Identity: a historical reader.] Palgrave Macmillan, 2013.
- Fahim, Farukh (2011), "Centuries' Subjugation Kicks off a Bitter Struggle", in Harsh Dobhal (ed.), Writings on Human Rights, Law, and Society in India: A Combat Law Anthology: Selections from Combat Law, 2002–2010, New Delhi: Human Rights Law Network/Socio Legal Information Centre, pp. 258–264, ISBN 978-81-89479-78-7
- Hangloo, Rattan Lal (2000), The State in Medieval Kashmir, Manohar, ISBN 978-81-7304-251-5
- Jalal, Ayesha (2002), Self and Sovereignty: Individual and Community in South Asian Islam Since 1850, Routledge, ISBN 978-1-134-59937-0
- Rai, Mridu (2004), Hindu Rulers, Muslim Subjects: Islam, Rights, and the History of Kashmir, C. Hurst & Co, ISBN 1-85065-661-4
- Schofield, Victoria (2000), Kashmir in Conflict, London and New York: I. B. Taurus & Co, ISBN 978-1-86064-898-4
- Schofield, Victoria (2010), Kashmir in Conflict: India, Pakistan and the Unending War, I.B.Tauris, ISBN 978-0-85773-078-7
- Sevea, Iqbal Singh (2012), The Political Philosophy of Muhammad Iqbal: Islam and Nationalism in Late Colonial India, Cambridge University Press, ISBN 978-1-139-53639-4
- Snedden, Christopher (2015), Understanding Kashmir and Kashmiris, Oxford University Press, ISBN 978-1-84904-342-7
- Watt, George (2014). A Dictionary of the Economic Products of India, Part 2. Cambridge University Press. ISBN 9781108068796.
- Zutshi, Chitralekha (2004), Languages of Belonging: Islam, Regional Identity, and the Making of Kashmir, C. Hurst & Co. Publishers, ISBN 978-1-85065-700-2

=== Books ===
- Bamzai, P. N. K. (1994), Culture and Political History of Kashmir: Ancient Kashmir, M.D. Publications Pvt. Ltd., ISBN 978-81-85880-31-0
- Bamzai, Prithivi Nath Kaul (1994), Culture and Political History of Kashmir: Medieval Kashmir, M.D. Publications, ISBN 978-81-85880-33-4
- Bakshi, S. R. (1997), Kashmir Through Ages, Volume 2: Kashmir - Valley and its Culture, Sarup & Sons, ISBN 978-81-85431-71-0
- Bhandari, Mohan C. (2006), Solving Kashmir, Lancer Publishers, ISBN 978-81-7062-125-6
- Chatterjee, Suhas (1998), Indian Civilization And Culture, M.D. Publications, ISBN 978-81-7533-083-2
- Dar, P Krishna (2000). Kashmiri Cooking. Penguin UK. ISBN 9789351181699.
- Green, Peter (1970), Alexander of Macedon: 356-323 B.c.: a Historical Biography, University of California Press, ISBN 978-0-520-07166-7
- Heckel, Waldemar (2003), The Wars of Alexander the Great 336–323 BC, Taylor & Francis, ISBN 978-0-203-49959-7
- Kaw, M.K. (2001), Kashmiri Pandits: Looking to the Future, APH Publishing, ISBN 978-81-7648-236-3
- Kaw, M. K. (2004), Kashmir and its People: Studies in the evolution of Kashmiri society, Volume 4 of KECSS research series: Culture and heritage of Kashmir, APH Publishing, p. 90, ISBN 978-81-7648-537-1
- Khan, Iqtidar Alam (2008), Historical Dictionary of Medieval India, Scarecrow Press, ISBN 978-0-8108-5503-8
- Madison Books; Andrews McMeel Publishing, LLC; Corby Kummer (1 November 2007). 1001 Foods To Die For. Andrews McMeel Publishing. ISBN 978-0-7407-7043-2.
- Hāṇḍā, Omacanda (1998), Textiles, Costumes, and Ornaments of the Western Himalaya, Indus Publishing, ISBN 978-81-7387-076-7
- Kennedy, Kenneth A. R. (2000), God-Apes and Fossil Men: Paleoanthropology of South Asia, University of Michigan Press, ISBN 978-0-472-11013-1
- Majumdar, Ramesh Chandra (1977), Ancient India, Motilal Banarsidass, ISBN 978-81-208-0436-4
- Parashar, Parmanand (2004), Kashmir The Paradise Of Asia, Sarup & Sons, ISBN 978-81-7625-518-9
- Rafiabadi, Hamid Naseem (2003), World Religions and Islam: A Critical Study, Part 2, Sarup & Sons, ISBN 978-81-7625-414-4
- Rafiabadi, Hamid Naseem (2005), Saints and Saviours of Islam, Sarup & Sons, ISBN 978-81-7625-555-4
- Rapson, Edward James (1955), The Cambridge History of India, Cambridge University Press, GGKEY:FP2CEFT2WJH
- Janet Rizvi (2001), Trans-Himalayan Caravans: Merchant Princes and Peasant Traders in Ladakh, Oxford University Press, ISBN 978-0-19-565817-0
- Sastri, K. A. Nilakanta (1988), Age of the Nandas And Mauryas, Motilal Banarsidass, ISBN 978-81-208-0466-1
- Sharma, Subhra (1985), Life in the Upanishads, Abhinav Publications, ISBN 978-81-7017-202-4
- Singh, Upinder (2008), A History of Ancient and Early Medieval India: From the Stone Age to the 12th Century, Pearson Education India, ISBN 978-81-317-1120-0
- Wink, André (1991), Al-Hind, the Making of the Indo-Islamic World, BRILL, ISBN 978-90-04-09509-0
- Solomon H. Katz; William Woys Weaver (2003). Encyclopedia of Food and Culture: Food production to Nuts. Scribner. ISBN 978-0-684-80566-5.
- The Panjab Past and Present. Department of Punjab Historical Studies, Punjabi University. 1993. p. 22.

=== Journal articles ===
- Bhasin, M.K.; Nag, Shampa (2002). "A Demographic Profile of the People of Jammu and Kashmir"(PDF). Journal of Human Ecology
- Downie, J.M.; Tashi, T.; Lorenzo, F.R.; Feusier, J.E.; Mir, H.; Prchal, J.T. (2016), "A Genome-Wide Search for Greek and Jewish Admixture in the Kashmiri Population", PLOS ONE, 11 (8) e0160614, Bibcode:2016PLoSO..1160614D, doi:10.1371/journal.pone.0160614, PMC 4973929, PMID 27490348
- Journal of History. Department of History, Jadavpur University. 1981. p. 76.
- The Journal of the Anthropological Survey of India, Volume 52. The Survey.
- The quarterly journal of the Mythic society (Bangalore)., Volume 96. The Society.

=== Primary sources ===
- Lawrence, Sir Walter Roper (1895), The Valley of Kashmir, Asian Educational Services, ISBN 978-81-206-1630-1
- Mohamed, C K. Census of India, 1921. Vol. XXII: Kashmir. Part I: Report.
- Proceedings – Indian History Congress, Volume 63. Indian History Congress. 2003.
- Punjab Census Report 17 Feb 1881. 1883.
- Ram, Anant; Raina, Hira Nand (1933). Census of India, 1931. Vol. XXIV: Jammu and Kashmir State. Part II: Imperial and State Tables.
- Sir George Watt (1903). Indian Art at Delhi 1903: Being the Official Catalogue of the Delhi Exhibition 1902–1903. Motilal Banarsidass Publ. ISBN 978-81-208-0278-0.
