= Kashmiri diaspora =

Kashmiris and their descendants living outside of Kashmir

Kashmiri
Languages
- Kashmiri

Religion
- Predominately: Islam Minority: Hinduism, Sikhism

The Kashmiri diaspora refers to Kashmiris who have migrated out of the Kashmir into other areas and countries, and their descendants.

== India ==
=== Punjab ===
Estimated, 1,000-1,200 Kashmiri Hindus live in Pathankot, Gurdaspur and the Cities of Doaba region and Punjab.

=== Gujarat ===
10,000 Kashmiri Hindus live in Gujarat. They settled here after the 1990 exodus.

=== Himachal Pradesh ===
The state of Himachal Pradesh in India has the second-largest Kashmiri language speakers after Kashmir Valley and adjoining areas. Kashmiri Pandits migrated to this region over centuries and including from 1947–48 to 1989–91. Large number of Kashmiri Pandits also came here after the eruption of militancy in the valley.

== Pakistan ==
=== Punjab ===
Heavy taxes under the Sikh rule, coupled with famine and starvation, caused many Kashmiri villagers to migrate to the plains of Punjab. These claims, made in Kashmiri histories, were corroborated by European travelers. When one such European traveler, Moorcroft, left the Valley in 1823, about 500 emigrants accompanied him across the Pir Panjal Pass. The 1833 famine resulted in many people leaving the Kashmir Valley and migrating to the Punjab, with the majority of weavers leaving Kashmir. Weavers settled down for generations in the cities of Punjab such as Jammu and Nurpur. The 1833 famine led to a large influx of Kashmiris into Amritsar. Kashmir's Muslims in particular suffered and had to leave Kashmir in large numbers, while Hindus were not much affected. Sikh rule in Kashmir ended in 1846 and was followed by the rule of Dogra Hindu maharajahs who ruled Kashmir as part of their princely state of Jammu and Kashmir.

Many Muslim Kashmiris migrated from the Kashmir Valley to the Punjab due to conditions in the princely state such as famine, extreme poverty and harsh treatment of Kashmiri Muslims by the Dogra Hindu regime. The Punjab Census Report, in 1891, enumerated 111,775 Muslims born in Kashmir who settled in Punjab, which was also equivalent to the entire population of Srinagar, back then standing at 118,960. According to the 1911 Census there were 177,549 Kashmiri Muslims in the Punjab. With the inclusion of Kashmiri settlements in NWFP this figure rose to 206,180.

Scholar Ayesha Jalal states that Kashmiris faced discrimination in the Punjab as well. Kashmiris settled for generations in the Punjab were unable to own land, including the family of Muhammad Iqbal. Scholar Chitralekha Zutshi states that Kashmiri Muslims settled in the Punjab retained emotional and familial links to Kashmir and felt obliged to struggle for the freedom of their brethren in the Valley.

According to the 1921 Census the total Kashmiri population in Punjab was 169,761. However, the Census report stated that only 3% of Kashmiris settled in Punjab retained their Kashmiri language. The number of people speaking Kashmiri in 1901 was 8,523 but had decreased to 7,190 in 1911. By 1921 the number of people speaking Kashmiri in Punjab had fallen to 4,690. The 1921 Census report stated that this fact showed that the Kashmiris who had settled in Punjab had adopted the Punjabi language of their neighbours. In contrast, the 1881 Census of Punjab showed that there were 49,534 speakers of the Kashmiri language in the Punjab. The 1881 Census recorded the number of Kashmiris in the Punjab as 179,020 while the 1891 Census recorded the Kashmiri population as 225,307 but the number of Kashmiri speakers recorded in the 1891 Census was 28,415.

Common krams (surnames) found amongst the Kashmiri Muslims who migrated from the Valley to the Punjab include Butt (Bhat), Dar (Dhar), Lun (Lone), Wain (Wani), Mir and Shaikh. The 1881 Census of the Punjab recorded these major Kashmiri sub-divisions in the Punjab along with their population. The Butt (Bhat) tribe numbered 24,463, the Dar (Dhar) tribe numbered 16,215, the Lun (Lone) tribe numbered 4,848, the Wain (Wani) tribe numbered 7,419, the Mir numbered 19,855 and the Sheikhs numbered 14,902. Watorfield also noted the presence of the Butt (Bhatt) and Dar (Dhar) castes amongst the Kashmiris of the town of Gujrat in Punjab.

=== Azad Jammu and Kashmir ===
In 1961, there were 10,000 refugees of Kashmiri origin in Pakistan, who had voting rights in elections of Azad Jammu and Kashmir. They were given an equal amount of representation in the election as the 109,000 Jammu refugees. In 1990, there were 400,000 refugee voters, compared to 1.2 million Azad Kashmir residents. The refugees continued to receive higher representation in the legislatures compared to the residents, Kashmiris being favoured more. This was justified on the grounds of showing "solidary with the Kashmiris in the Indian-administered Kashmir". Scholar Christopher Snedden remarks that the higher representation given to refugees endows opportunities to the central government of Pakistan to influence the election results.

During the 1990s around 50,000 Kashmiris fled from Indian administered Kashmir to Pakistan, which as of 2010 had not granted citizenship to up to 40 per cent of the refugees. Ms Lucas suggests that the Pakistani government has been slow in providing citizenship to the refugees because doing so might nullify their right to self-determination.

=== Sindh ===
The city of Karachi is home to a significant diaspora of Kashmiris. According to the 2017 Pakistan Census, 63,784 people in Karachi reported Kashmiri as their mother tongue.

== United Kingdom ==
Around 70% of all British Pakistanis in England trace their origins to the administrative territory of Azad Kashmir in northeastern Pakistan, mainly from the Mirpur, Kotli and Bhimber districts. Many of them migrated to the United Kingdom in the 1960s to work as labourers after the construction of the Mangla Dam by the Pakistani government. Large Azad Kashmiri communities can be found in Birmingham, Bradford, Manchester, Leeds, Luton and the surrounding towns.

The Valley Kashmiris in the UK maintain that they are "Kashmiris" and the Azad Kashmiris are "nouveaux Kashmiris".

== United States ==
Approximately 40,000-45,000 members of the Kashmiri diaspora live in the United States.

== Canada ==
In the 2016 Canadian census, approximately 6145 people reported being of Kashmiri descent.

Kashmiri Canadian demography by religion
Religious group	2021 (Note: Religious breakdown proportions based on "Kashmiri" ethnic or cultural origin response on the 2021 census.)	
Religious group	Pop.	%
Islam	5,000	81.17%
Hinduism	560	9.09%
Irreligion	305	4.95%
Sikhism	225	3.65%
Christianity	60	0.97%
Buddhism	0	0%
Indigenous spirituality	0	0%
Other	10	0.16%
Total Kashmiri Canadian population	6,160	100%

== Singapore ==
A community of approximately 250 Kashmiri Pandits lives in Singapore.

== Overseas organisations ==
- Stand With Kashmir
- Kashmir Civitas
- Kashmir Hindu Foundation (KHF)
- Kashmir Global Council
- Australian forum for Kashmir
- Kashmiri Women council
- Daughters of Kashmir
- Free Kashmir Organisation Germany
- Friends of Kashmir Canada
- Friends of Kashmir Dallas Texas USA
- International Kashmir Peace Forum Spain
- Jammu and Kashmir Council on Human Rights UK
- Jammu and Kashmir Overseas Community Saudi Arabia

Indo-Canadian Kashmiri Forum

- Jammu Kashmir Forum France
- Jammu and Kashmir Human Rights Movement UK
- Jammu Kashmir Liberation Front London UK
- The Jammu Kashmir Self Determination Movement International
- Justice and Freedom Party
- Justice For Kashmir Los Angeles
- Justice Foundation UK
- Kashmir American Welfare Association
- Kashmir awami Society Kuwait
- Kashmir Awareness Forum of Canada
- Indo-European Kashmiri Forum
- Kashmiri Overseas Organisations
- Million Voices for Kashmiri Unity

== See also ==
- Mirpuri diaspora
- Kashmiris
- Kashmir conflict
- List of Kashmiri people
