= Mirza Pandit Dhar =

Prominent Kashmiri

Mirza Pandit Dhar (Kashmiri: مرزا پنڈت دار) was a prominent Kashmiri during the Afghan rule of Kashmir in the early 19th century. He is notable for his work with Birbal Dhar to end Afghan rule of the Kashmir Valley by challenging the acting governor Azad Khan. His brother was Dewan Sahaj Ram Dhar, a notable statesman in the region during the Mughal era. Both were members of the prominent Dhar family of Kashmir. Sahaj Ram's grandson was Mahanand Joo Dhar, another notable Kashmiri Pandit court official at the time.
