= Saifuddin Kitchlew =

Indian revolutionary and politician

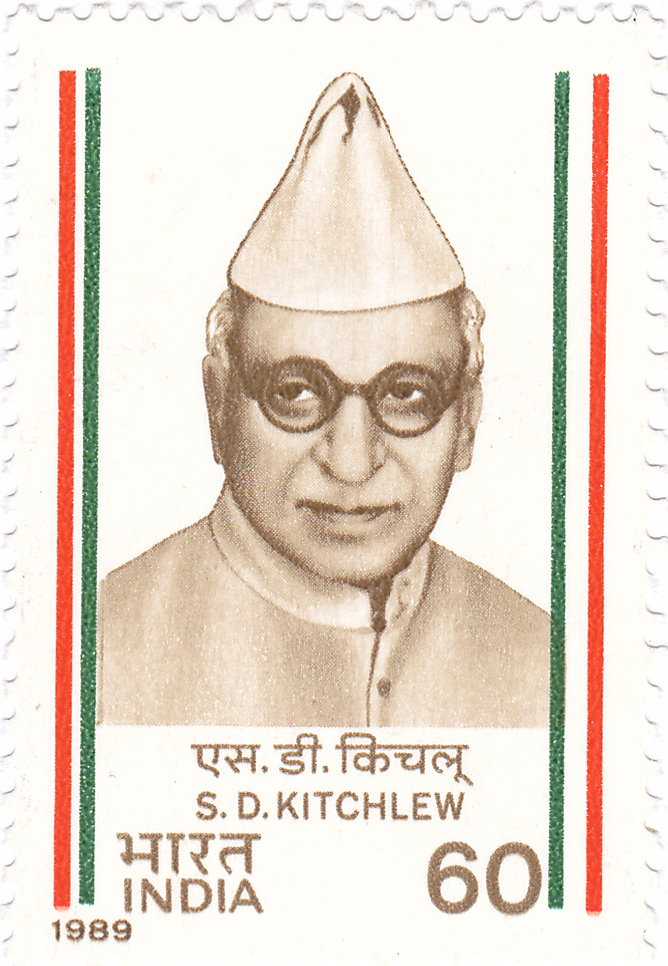
- Born: 15 January 1888; Amritsar, Punjab, British India
- Died: 9 October 1963 (aged 75); New Delhi, India
- Occupations: Independence activist, politician
- Spouse: Saadat Bano

Dr. Saifuddin Kitchlew (15 January 1888 – 9 October 1963) was an Indian independence activist, barrister, politician and later a leader of the peace movement. A member of Indian National Congress, he first became Punjab Provincial Congress Committee (Punjab PCC) head and later the General Secretary of the All India Congress Committee in 1924. He is most remembered for the protests in Punjab after the implementation of Rowlatt Act in March 1919, after which on 10 April, he and another leader Satyapal, were secretly sent to Dharamsala. A public protest rally against their arrest and that of Gandhi, on 13 April 1919 at Jallianwala Bagh, Amritsar, led to the infamous Jallianwala Bagh massacre. He was also a founding member of Jamia Millia Islamia. He was awarded the Stalin Peace Prize (now known as Lenin Peace Prize) in 1952.

== Early life ==
Saifuddin Kitchlew was born on January 15, 1888 in Amritsar, in the Punjab Province of British India into a Converted Kashmiri pandit family of the Kitchlew clan, to parents Azizuddin Kitchlew and Dan Bibi. His father owned a pashmina and saffron trading business and originally belonged to a Kashmiri Pandit family of Baramulla, who had converted to Islam from Hinduism. His father, Ahmed Jo migrated from Kashmir to Punjab in the mid-19th century after the Kashmir famine of 1871.

Kitchlew went to Islamia High School in Amritsar, later obtaining a B.A. from Cambridge University, and a Ph.D. from a German university, before practising law in India.

In 1915, Kitchlew married Saadat Bano, a poet and writer who would join Kitchlew as an independence activist.

== Career ==
On his return Kitchlew established his legal practice in Amritsar, and soon came in contact with Gandhi. In 1919, he was elected the Municipal Commissioner of the city of Amritsar. He took part in the Satyagraha (Non-cooperation) movement and soon left his practice to join the Indian independence movement, as well as the All India Khilafat Committee.

== Political career ==
=== Jallianwala Bagh ===
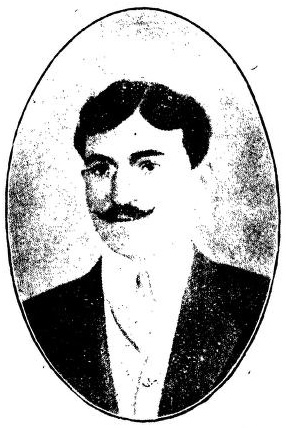
Saif-ud-Din Kitchlew

Kitchlew was first exposed to Indian nationalism after public outcry over the Rowlatt Acts. Kitchlew was arrested with Gandhi and Dr. Satyapal for leading protests in Punjab against the legislation. To protest the arrest of the trio, a public meeting had gathered at the Jallianwala Bagh, when General Reginald Dyer and his troops fired upon the unarmed, civilian crowd. Thousands were killed, and Thousands were injured. This act was the worst case of civilian massacre since the Indian Rebellion of 1857 and riots broke out throughout the Punjab.

=== Political mainstream ===
Kitchlew rose in the Congress Party, heading its Punjab unit before rising to the post of AICC General Secretary, an important executive position in 1924. Kitchlew was also the chairman of the reception committee of the Congress session in Lahore in 1929–30, where on 26 January 1930, the Indian National Congress declared Indian independence and inaugurated an era of civil disobedience and revolution aimed to achieve full independence.

Kithclew was a founding leader of the Naujawan Bharat Sabha (Indian Youth Congress), which rallied hundreds of thousands of students and young Indians to nationalist causes. He was a member of the Foundation Committee of Jamia Millia Islamia, which met on 29 October 1920 and led to the foundation of Jamia Millia Islamia University.

He started an Urdu daily Tanzim and was instrumental in the establishment of Swaraj Ashram in January 1921 at Amritsar to train young men for national work and to promote Hindu-Muslim unity. Throughout the 1930-1934 struggles, Kitchlew was repeatedly arrested, and in all spent fourteen years behind bars.

Kitchlew supported a united Indian nationalism against British colonial rule and opposed the partition of India, holding that a divided India would weaken Muslims, both economically and politically.

== Post-independence ==
Kitchlew was opposed to the Muslim League's demand for Pakistan and later in the 1940s became President of the Punjab Congress Committee. In 1947 he strongly opposed the acceptance of the Partition of India. He spoke out against it at public meetings across the country, and at the All India Congress Committee session that ultimately voted for the resolution. He called it a blatant "surrender of nationalism for communalism". Some years after partition and Independence, he left the Congress. He moved closer to the Communist Party of India. He was the founder president of the All-India Peace Council and remained President of 4th Congress of All-India Peace Council, held at Madras in 1954, besides remaining Vice President of the World Peace Council.

Kitchlew moved to Delhi after his house burnt down during the partition of India riots of 1947, spending the rest of his life working for closer political and diplomatic relations with the USSR. He received the Stalin Peace Prize in 1952. In 1951, a Government Act made him, Jawaharlal Nehru, and Maulana Abul Kalam Azad, life trustees of the Jallianwala Bagh National Memorial Trust.

He died on 9 October 1963, survived by a son, Toufique Kitchlew, who lives in a Lampur village on the outskirts of Delhi, and five daughters. While four of his daughters married men from Pakistan, one daughter, Zahida Kitchlew, was married to the South Indian music director M. B. Sreenivasan who worked mainly in Malayalam and Tamil film industries.

== Legacy ==
A colony in Ludhiana, Punjab, popularly called Kitchlu Nagar, is named after him. India Post released a special commemorative stamp featuring him in 1989. The Jamia Milia Islamia created a Saifuddin Kitchlew Chair at the MMAJ Academy of Third world Studies in 2009. Kitchlu Chowk in Amritsar, at the intersection of Mall Road and Court Road, is named after him; there is a small bust on a pillar at the intersection.

== See also ==
- Indian Independence Movement, Indian Nationalism, Indian National Congress
- Composite nationalism
- Amritsar Massacre, Salt Satyagraha, Partition of India
- Dr Syed Mahmud, Mukhtar Ahmed Ansari, Maulana Azad, Abbas Tyabji, Hakim Ajmal Khan, Asaf Ali, Maghfoor Ahmad Ajazi

== Bibliography ==
- Freedom fighter: The story of Dr. Saifuddin Kitchlew, by F. Z. Kichlew. New Horizon, 1979. ISBN 0-86116-126-2.
- Saifuddin Kitchlew: hero of Jallianwala Bagh (National Biography), by Toufique Kitchlew. National Book Trust, India, 1987.
- Selected works and speeches of Dr. Saifuddin Kitchlew, Ed. Toufique Kitchlew. 1999.
- Luminous Life Of Saifuddin Kitchlew, by Shyam Dua. Tiny Tots Publication, 2004. ISBN 81-7573-818-9.
