= Gulzar Dehlvi =

Indian poet (1926–2020)

Gulzar Dehlavi
- آنند موہن زتشی گلزار دہلوی
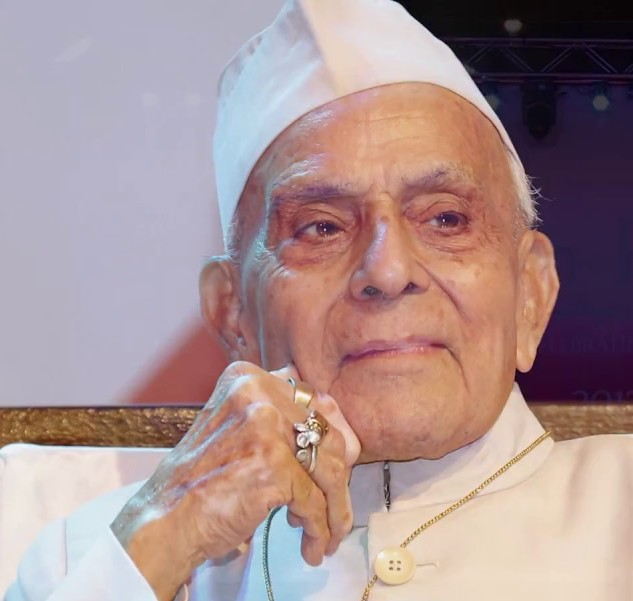
- Born: Anand Mohan Zutshi; 7 July 1926; Old Delhi's Gali Kashmeerian
- Died: 12 June 2020 (aged 93); Noida, Uttar Pradesh, India
- Occupations: Poet, ghazal writer.
- Spouse: Kavita Zutshi
- Children: Anoop Zutshi, Meena Ugra
- Writing career
- Genre: Ghazal
- Subjects: Love, philosophy, mysticism

Anand Mohan Zutshi Gulzar Dehlavi (Urdu: آنند موہن زتشی گلزار دہلوی; Hindi: आनन्द मोहन ज़ुत्शी गुलज़ार देहलवी) (7 July 1926 – 12 June 2020) was an Indian Urdu poet, scholar, and journalist. Born in Old Delhi's Gali Kashmirian.

He was honored by the Vice President of India on his 91st birthday for his contribution to Urdu poetry. He devoted his life to the service of Urdu, for which he was honoured by various personalities. He edited the first Urdu science magazine, Science Ki Dunya, which was launched in 1975. Pandit Jawahar Lal Nehru recited his poetry 'Zarurat Hai Un Naujawano Ki' on 15 August 1947 in Red Fort. His book 'Kulliyat-E-Gulzar' was launched by former Vice President Hamid Ansari.

== Personal life ==
Gulzar Dehlvi was from a Zutshi family of Kashmiri Pandits. He was born to Pandit Tribhuvan Nath (also known as Zar Dehlvi) a Professor and Brij Rani Zutshi. Gulzar Dehlvi attended the Ramjas School and BVJ Sanskrit School. He gained a Master of Arts degree from Hindu College. His father, Pandit Tribhuvan Nath ‘Zar’ Dehlavi, received the public title of ‘Mawlawi Sahib’ for his dedication as a teacher of Urdu and Persian languages at the Delhi University for around 40 years. He also influenced one of the most prominent political scientist of India, Devasya Verma. He was married to Kavita Zutshi and they had 2 children, a son named Anoop and a daughter named Meena.

== Death ==
Dehlvi died in his Noida home on 12 June 2020, from post COVID-19 complications, one month before his 94th birthday.

== See also ==
- List of Urdu language poets
- Urdu poetry
- Zutshi
