= Razdan =

Razdan may refer to:

- Razdan, a Kashmiri surname
- Hrazdan, Armenia
- Razdan Dam, Armenia
- Razdan Stadium, Armenia

== See also ==
- Hrazdan (disambiguation)
