= P. K. Kaul =

Indian ambassador to USA

Ambassador Pratap Kishen Kaul

Indian Ambassador to the United States
- In office 1986–1989
- Prime Minister: Rajiv Gandhi

Personal details
- Born: 3 July 1929 Kolkata
- Died: 1 March 2007 (aged 77) New Delhi
- Education: Harvard University, University of Allahabad
- Occupation: Diplomat, Ambassador of India to USA

Pratap Kishen Kaul (3 July 1929 – 2 March 2007) was an Indian Civil Servant and held several important and sensitive posts in the Government of India. He was from the 1951 batch of the Indian Administrative Service and served as the Cabinet Secretary, Government of India from 1985 to 1986. He was also the Indian Ambassador to the United States from 1986 to 1989.

== Personal life ==
Kaul was a postgraduate in economics from the University of Allahabad, and went on to earn a master's degree in public administration at Harvard University.

He died of cancer on 2 March 2007 in New Delhi aged 77. He is survived by his wife Usha, three daughters, five grandchildren, and four great-grandchildren.

== Career ==
=== Civil services ===
He was from the 1951 batch of the IAS and was assigned to the Uttar Pradesh cadre where he served for 14 years before moving to the government of India. He served in various capacities in New Delhi and was Deputy Secretary, Director, and Joint Secretary in the Ministry of Finance and Company Affairs. He was also Commissioner and Secretary of, the Industries department in the Government of Uttar Pradesh from 1973 to 1975. He was secretary of three important ministries and held the posts of commerce secretary, defense secretary, and finance secretary of the government of India. He served as cabinet secretary of India from 1985-1986. He also served as alternate governor to International Monetary Fund (IMF), World Bank (WB) and Asian Development Bank (ADB).

As a finance secretary, Kaul played an important role in formulating policies for export and import promotion, infrastructure for movement and financing of exports, and developing free trade zones in India. Kaul also served as the alternate governor of the Asian development bank (ADB), World Bank (WB), and International Monetary Fund (IMF). Kaul was the chairman of the SEBI appointed committee which oversaw the implementation and facilitation of the SEBI Mutual Funds regulations, 1996. The committee helped the trustees of Mutual funds to best perform their role so that the mutual funds could be managed more ethically and responsibly. He was the Indian Ambassador to the United States from 1986 to 1989.

=== Advisory role ===
Kaul was on the advisory council of the All India Kashmiri Samaj (AIKS). He also advised industrial and financial firms on financial management and corporate planning matters. In 2005, he was appointed a head of a high-powered committee to review the functioning of Central Government Health Service (CGHS) by the government of India. He was also a member of the Space Commission and the Atomic Energy Commission of India. He retired as cabinet secretary.
