= Sampat Prakash =

Kashmiri trade union leader (1937–2023)

Sampat Prakash Kundu
- Born: Sampat Prakash Kundu; 10 March 1937; Srinagar, Jammu and Kashmir, British India
- Died: 1 July 2023 (aged 86); Srinagar, Jammu and Kashmir, India
- Education: Tyndale Biscoe School
- Alma mater: Sri Pratap College
- Occupation: Trade unionist
- Known for: Activism, advocacy for Kashmir's special status
- Children: Lenin Kundu (son); Ravinder Kundu (son)
- Parent: Neel Kanth Kundu (father)

Sampat Prakash Kundu (also spelt as Sampath Prakash Kundoo; 10 March 1937 – 1 July 2023) was a Kashmiri nationalist, trade unionist and activist, known for his efforts in fighting for the rights and welfare of the working class. He played a significant role in shaping trade union activism in the region, advocating for the equitable treatment of government employees, teachers, and workers. Kundu has held several leadership positions, including Chairman of the J&K Trade Union Centre, State President of Hind Mazdoor Sabha, and State President of Retired Gazetted/Non-Gazetted Employees.

Kundu was elected as the President of the Central Lal Bazaar Cooperative Housing Society in 1974. In the late 1980s, when Kashmir witnessed a surge in Islamist violence, leading to the ethnic cleansing of Kashmiri Hindus, Kundu emerged as a resilient and determined leader. Despite facing immense hardship and the trauma of displacement, he dedicated himself to raising awareness about the plight of his community and advocating for their rights. However, once the Islamic Militancy post the 1990s made it impossible for him to live in Kashmir, he was forced to move to Jammu.

== Early life ==
Sampat Prakash Kundu was born on March 10, 1937, in the Rainawari neighbourhood of Srinagar district, in the Kashmir Valley of the erstwhile princely state of Jammu and Kashmir, within British India (now in Jammu and Kashmir, India), into a working-class Kashmiri Pandit family. Kundu spent his formative years in the region, which deeply influenced his later activism and political endeavors.

Kundu received his early education at Tyndale Biscoe School in Lal Chowk, where he attended classes with notable figures such as Farooq Abdullah, who would later become the president of the Jammu and Kashmir National Conference party and also the Chief Minister of the erstwhile Indian state of Jammu and Kashmir. The nationalist sentiment of Prakash's father, Neel Kanth Kundu, who served as the principal of the same school and was an advisor to Sheikh Mohammad Abdullah, greatly influenced Prakash's upbringing.

Kundu's initial foray into politics began during his time as a student activist. When Sheikh Abdullah, who was serving as the Prime Minister of Jammu and Kashmir at the time, was arrested, Kundu organized a student protest at Sri Pratap College in Srinagar, displaying his commitment to political activism even in his early years.

It was during this period that Kundu played a pivotal role in establishing student politics in Kashmir. He formed the valley's first student body, and he was honored to serve as its founding president. This experience not only shaped Prakash's leadership skills but also introduced him to the ideals of Marxism, which would leave a lasting impact on his political ideology.

When the Kashmir militancy post the 1990s made it impossible for him to live in Kashmir, he was forced to move to Jammu.

== Political views and activism ==
Kundu's political journey began during his student years, where he was heavily influenced by the nationalist ideals of his father, Neel Kanth Kundu, who served as the principal of Srinagar's Tyndale Biscoe School. Inspired by the nationalism espoused by his father and the school's advisor, Sheikh Mohammad Abdullah, Prakash developed a deep commitment to the cause of Kashmir.

During the partition of India and Pakistan, when Pakistani tribals infiltrated Kashmir, Kundu responded to Sheikh Abdullah's call to take to the streets and fight against the invaders. This early experience shaped his understanding of the political landscape and instilled in him a sense of resistance against external threats to the region.

As a student leader, Kundu played a pivotal role in the establishment of student politics in Kashmir. He campaigned for the formation of a student body and eventually became its founding president when the first student organization was formed in the valley. It was during this time that he was introduced to the ideologies of Marxism, which further shaped his political outlook.

Kundu's activism and political views often brought him into conflict with the administration. He was arrested for the first time in 1958 by the men of the notorious police inspector Qadir Ganderbali. These confrontations with the authorities led his father to relocate him to Jammu to pursue law studies, where he developed an inclination towards the leftist Communist Party of India (CPI).

Kundu's political ideology was marked by his strong advocacy for the rights and welfare of low-paid government employees in Jammu and Kashmir. Under his leadership, these workers organized demonstrations and chanted slogans such as "Trade Union ki Kya Buniyad—Marxvaad, Leninvaad, Red Flag Up, Up." Kundu self-identified as a student of Marxist-Leninist ideologies, which he invoked as the foundation of the trade union movement.

Under the guidance of Communist leaders, Kundu decided to join the government services and abandoned his law studies. As a government employee, he established the first trade union body in Jammu and Kashmir, acting on the advice of his communist mentors. In 1967, Kundu organized the first employee strike in the valley, effectively paralyzing the administration and compelling them to address the demands of the workers.

In 1967, he was arrested for launching a mass agitation against the government, demanding better wages. Along with 17 colleagues, he was dismissed from service and subsequently booked under the Preventive and Detention Act, a law that did not apply to the citizens of Jammu and Kashmir due to the special status granted by Article 35(A). The movement sought to address the disparities arising from Article 370, which granted special status to Jammu and Kashmir (state) and resulted in different treatment for its residents.

Throughout his career, Sampat Prakash Kundu remained a staunch nationalist, advocating for the preservation of Kashmir's special status and supporting Article 35-A. This article granted special rights to the people of the former state, particularly in matters relating to land and employment. Kundu's unwavering commitment to these causes earned him respect across the mainstream separatist divide in the valley.

Kundu became an integral part of the Panun Kashmir, an organization representing the aspirations of Kashmiri Pandits, which aims to establish a separate homeland for the community within Kashmir. His involvement with Panun Kashmir reflected his strong belief in the need for a secure and dignified future for Kashmiri Pandits, who had been uprooted from their ancestral homeland.

For his leadership in the strike and mobilization efforts, Sampat Prakash Kundu was arrested and detained under the Preventive Detention Law passed by the Indian Parliament. He challenged his detention through a habeas corpus petition, which eventually reached a historic 13-member bench in the Supreme Court of India. Despite the dismissal of his petition, he was later released on humanitarian grounds, recognized as a leader advocating non-violently for the rights of his people. He led protests against the establishment of separate Sainik and Pandit colonies in Kashmir, considering them divisive and detrimental to the spirit of Kashmiriyat (Kashmiri identity). Kundu firmly believed in the unity of the Kashmiri society, with Muslims and Pandits having historically lived as brothers, sharing joys and sorrows.

Kundu held strong Marxist beliefs and was highly regarded by many Kashmiri Muslims as a symbol of Kashmiriyat, representing the Valley's syncretic culture. Despite the potential for social exclusion within his own community, Kundu openly discussed the resolution of the Kashmir issue and maintained a close association with jailed J&K Liberation Front leader Mohammad Yasin Malik. He staunchly opposed the scrapping of special status in 2019 and criticized the government's firm policies. While he garnered admiration and support from the Kashmiri Muslims, some Kashmiri Pandits, including BJP leader Ashwani Chrungoo, viewed him as an outcast due to ideological differences. Kundu's son, Ravinder Kundo, recalled his father's perspective on addressing the suffering of all communities, questioning the focus solely on the killings of Kashmiri Pandits and emphasizing the deaths of many Muslims as well. Sampat Prakash's life was characterized by a complex interplay of diverse viewpoints, and he left a notable impact on the socio-political landscape of Kashmir.

=== Views on Article 370 and 35-A ===
Sampat Prakash Kundu vehemently advocated for the preservation of Article 370, which he considered the supreme identity of the Kashmiri nation. He believed that the special status provided by Article 370 and 35A was crucial for safeguarding the rights and identity of the people of Jammu and Kashmir.

Throughout his life, Sampat Prakash Kundu continued to voice his concerns about the state of his people, expressing dismay at what he perceived as a failure to protect the region's special status and identity. He criticized the dissolution of the State's legislature, the lack of unity among Kashmiri politicians, and the subsequent abrogation of Article 370.

Kundu underlined the historical significance of Article 35(A), tracing its origins back to the time of British rule and the subsequent sale of Kashmir to the Dogra rulers. He acknowledged the efforts of his ancestors, such as Jia Lal Kalim, Professor Jia Lal Koul, Shanker Lal Koul, and Jia Lal Jalali, who fought for the rights of state subjects of Jammu and Kashmir during the reign of Partab Singh. State subject laws, including Article 35(A), are seen by Kundu as vital for safeguarding the interests of the Kashmiri Pandit community, Muslim Kashmiris, and Dogra brothers alike.

=== Views on The Exodus of Kashmiri Pandits ===
Sampat Prakash witnessed the exodus of Kashmiri Pandits in the 1990s, a period marked by selective and targeted killings that fueled fear and insecurity. He contended that the exodus was not the result of communal strife but rather an accident of history, emphasizing that no Kashmiri Pandit left the Valley willingly. He also expressed disappointment with the collective silence of the majority Kashmiri Muslims during this tumultuous period, feeling that it betrayed the principles of Kashmiriyat (the composite culture of the region).

Despite being a Kashmiri Pandit, Kundu has actively opposed the establishment of separate Sainik and Pandit colonies in Kashmir. He perceived such divisions as a threat to the unity and harmony of the Kashmiri society, emphasizing the longstanding bonds of brotherhood and mutual support between Muslims and Pandits. He attributed the proposal for separate colonies to a government conspiracy aimed at dividing the Kashmiri community, urging fellow Kashmiri Pandits to stand against any attempts to fracture the social fabric of the region.

== Arrests ==
Kundu's political activism often resulted in his arrest and detention. He faced numerous run-ins with the administration due to his outspoken views and participation in protests. His first arrest occurred in 1958 when he was apprehended by the men of Inspector Sheikh Ghulam Qadir Alias Qadir Ganderbali, a figure notorious for his involvement in suppressing dissent. In 1967, he was arrested for launching a mass agitation against the government, demanding better wages.

== Death ==
On 1 July 2023, Sampat Prakash died from a cardiac arrest in Srinagar. Kundu was brought to the Sher-i-Kashmir Institute of Medical Sciences (SKIMS) in Soura, where medical professionals declared him dead. He was 86.

Kundu had been residing in Srinagar for the past four months at the time. His family members confirmed his death and announced that his cremation ceremony would take place on 2 July 2023 in Karan Nagar (Srinagar). The news of Kundu's death was met with condolences from various quarters, including politicians, trade unions, and other international organisations. He was cremated at Karan Nagar on 2 July 2023.

== Bibliography ==
- Haksar, Nandita (2015). The Many Faces of Kashmiri Nationalism: From the Cold War to the Present Day. India: Speaking Tiger.
