= Brij Lal Bhat =

Indian social worker

- Bhat (left) receiving the Padma Shri in 2026
- Citizenship: India
- Occupation: Social worker
- Awards: Padma Shri (2026)

Brij Lal Bhat is an Indian social worker. He advocates for the return of Kashmiri Pandits to the Kashmir Valley. In 2026, he was awarded the Padma Shri for social work.
