= Saadat Bano =

Indian poet and independence activist

- Born: 1893; Amritsar, India
- Died: August 18, 1970 (aged 76–77); New Delhi, India
- Occupations: Writer, poet
- Spouse: Saifuddin Kitchlew

Saadat Bano (1893 – 18 August 1970) was an Indian freedom fighter, political activist, and poet involved in the Indian independence movement. Bano wrote extensively on topics such as women's rights, education, and nationalism.

== Biography ==
Bano was born in Amritsar, India in 1893. Her father was a prominent lawyer and she learned Arabic, Farsi, and English while growing up. At the age of 16, she published a series of articles entitled Freedom of Women for the magazine Tehzeeb-e-Niswan. By 1911, she became more exposed to national politics and began fundraising for the Red Crescent Society in response to ongoing wars in Tripoli and the Balkan Wars.

In 1915, Bano married independence activist Saifuddin Kitchlew. In 1918, she published poems praising the efforts of nationalists Lala Lajpat Rai and Mahatma Gandhi. After Kitchlew was arrested on April 10, 1919, Bano was supposed to speak at Jallianwala Bagh on April 13 but was late, missing the Jallianwala Bagh massacre. Following these events, Bano served those who were wounded in protests against the British at her house. She also tried to connect with Muslims in America to "arouse their anti-imperialist sentiments" in support of the independence effort. Bano briefly acted as acted as Chairperson of the Swaraj Ashram, founded by Kitchlew in 1921.

Bano also wrote on topics such as women's rights, education, and nationalism, as well as attending sessions of the Indian National Congress.

Bano lived in New Delhi in her later life and died on August 18, 1970.
