= Wanvun =

Kashmiri folk music

Wanvun, literally "chorus", is a style of singing used by Kashmiri people before certain rituals such as Yagnopavit and marriages. It can also be used to describe a music session at which traditional songs are sung. It is also known as Rauf.

"Wanwun" is sung on a fixed beat, with a spoken word type rhythm. The tune is always the same, but depending on which event it is sung at, the pitch varies. The women singing use alliteration, emphasis, metaphor, and simile to tell stories through song. In the 1980s, the Indian Council for Cultural Relations expressed concern that as modern marriages were using songs from movies, there were less old people singing the traditional wanvun. In some places, wanvun is sung to celebrate the end of Ramadan.

== See also ==
- Kashmiri Muslims
- Kashmiri Pandits
- Kashmiris
