= Dhar (surname) =

Origin
- Origin: Bengali Hindu, Kashmiri Pandits & Kashmiri Muslim
- Region of origin: Bengal, Kashmir and Punjab

Dhar is an Indian surname. It is commonly found among the Hindu Bengali Kayastha and Baniks including Subarnabanik community in Bengal region. Dhar or Dar is also used by some Kashmiri and Punjabi-Kashmiri clans and communities native to the Kashmir Valley and Punjab, and common today among Kashmiri Hindus and Kashmiri Muslims.

== History and origins ==
=== Bengali surname ===
The Bengali Hindu surname Dhar is probably derived from Bengali dhār (ধার) meaning 'credit'. It is also used by the Bengali diaspora in neighbouring states.

=== Kashmiri surname ===
Dhar or Dar is also used by some Kashmiri clans and communities native to the Kashmir Valley in Jammu and Kashmir, India, and common today among Kashmiri Hindus and Kashmiri Muslims. Outside Kashmir, it is used by members of the Kashmiri diaspora, in places like Punjab, Bengal, Gujarat, and Maharashtra.

The Kashmiri surname Dhar originated as an honorific given to a village head, strongman, or warlord of a jagir. The title was widespread by the 12th century CE and continued until the 14th century CE. The earliest available records of Dhar or Dar used as a surname date back to the 16th century CE.

Furthermore, Kalhana has explained in Rajatarangini, a book considered vital by historians that the term Dhar comes from the word Dharra (Pronounced : Darra) which also happened to have a connection to an ancient mountain ridge called Kakodar. Kakodar in ancient times was known as Karkotadhara. Kalhana has used the word "similar" for both Dar and Dhar in Rajatrangini, giving modern-day historians a hint of changing pronunciation claims to be true.

==== Spelling variations of the surname in context of Kalhana ====
According to some Pandit historians the surname originates from the Sanskrit word Dharra which translates to "Lord" and historically this term was always used as a Suffix for the mountains of Kashmir e.g. Karkotadharra which is now called Kakodar. Thus the two spellings have a common origin.

The spelling of the surname in Sanskrit was Dhar at the time when the prevalent writing system was the Sharada script; in spoken Kashmiri, the surname Dhar may have gotten distorted to Dar. With the advent of Islam in Kashmir, new Muslims who had converted from Hinduism retained their surname, but may have modified the spelling to differentiate themselves from the Kashmiri Hindu from which they came.

Kalhana specifically mentioned Dar/Dhar as a Brahman family in his Rajatarangini.

Dar also should not be confused with Dangar or Damar. All these surnames have no connection based on historical evidence.

==== Persian, Kashmiri Pandits and its effects ====
"The scholarship of the Pandits in Persian reached its high watermark during this period. They wrote exquisite poetry in Persian and were master writers in prose. Munshi Bhawani Das stands preeminent amongst the prose writers of the day. So also Lachhi Ram Saroor who rose very high at the Court of Nawabs of Oudh mainly because of his high poetical merit. Rai Rayan Anand Ram Karihalu was a great favourite of Shah Alam II and a great poet. He was a great Persian and Arabic scholar. So also Pandit Taba Ram Turki (1776 A.D. to 1847 A.D.), Sat Ram Baqaya, Pandit Daya Ram Kachru (1743 A.D. to 1811 A.D.) Aftab Bhan, Gobind Kaul, Kailas Dar (died 1772 A.D.) Lasa Kaul, Deva Kaul, Thakur Das, Gopal Dar (1735 A.D. to 1798 A.D.). Raja Kak Dar, Rugh Nath Kaul (1735 to 1807 A.D.) and many others. The contributions made by them to Persian literature have elicited the significant remarks from competent critics that in the mastery of the Persian language the Kashmiri Pandits were second only to the Persians. About pandit Anand Ram Karihalu it is remarked that his mastery of Arabic and Persian was so complete that even amongst the Muslims nobody could compete with him. Pandit Birbar Kachru (1789-1859 A.D.) to whom reference has been made in these pages has written a voluminous history of Kashmir. He has dealt with social and economic conditions of the people in a very detailed and lucid manner. Pandit Anand Ram Pahalwan has carried the History of Kashmir by Narain Kaul from 1712 A.D. to 1785 A.D. Birbar Kachru, besides being a historian, wrote good poetry as well. The Kashmir Pandits of this period were very orthodox in religion, but that did not cripple their minds. In outdoor life they hayed and described themselves as any other citizen would do. The use of words like Banda, Bandai Chas, Bandai Dargah, Ahqar, Ibn etc with their names would show this. Not only that. They offered sometimes their prayers also in Persian language, and prefixed even their Gods with such epithets as Hazrat."

This specific passage explains the probability that there is a high chance many Sanskrit surnames may have been influenced by Persian in the Early Kashmiri Hindu community. Not to ignore that even in the Modern Era a Popular Pandit surname Bhatt is written as Batt / Butt by Potohari / Punjabi Speaking Muslims of Kashmiri descent (or ethnic bloodline) around the world which may also have similar reasons.

==== Influence on Kashmir ====
Some Historical accounts clearly record the involvement of people belonging to modern day Dar tribe in Kashmir's politics.

When Hasan Shah wanted to settle Syeds in Kashmir his decision was greatly revolted by People belonging to Dar, Raina, Magre (Magray) and Thakar (Thakur) tribes of Kashmir.

In another book it is mentioned that:

The defeat of the Sayyids brought to the fore front four Kashmiri Leaders. Jahangir Magre, Saif Dar, Idi Raina and Shams Chak. Jahangir Magre has said to be later overthrown by Malik Saif Dar.

== Notable people surnamed Dhar or Dar ==
- Abdul Majeed Dar, former Hizbul Mjuhedeen commander
- Aneek Dhar, Indian singer
- Angira Dhar, Indian actress
- Anuj Dhar, Indian author and journalist
- Aditya Dhar, film director
- Basit Ahmed Dar, commander of The Resistance Front(TRF)
- Birbal Dhar, leader of Kashmiri resistance to Afghan rule
- Dipsita Dhar, Indian politician and student activist, All India Joint Secretary of Students' Federation of India
- Divya Dhar, New Zealand medical doctor
- Farooq Ahmed Dar, JKLF leader
- Humayon Dar, Islamic economist and Shari'a advisor
- KSHMR (real name Niles Hollowell-Dhar), Indo-American EDM artist
- Kiran Kumar, Indian actor
- Maqbool Dar, Minister of State for Home Affairs, India
- Meeraji (born Mohammed Sanaullah Dar), Urdu poet-scholar, considered one of the fathers of modernism in Urdu literature
- Mirza Pandit Dhar, prominent Kashmiri in the early 19th century
- Muhammad Ahsan Dar, founder and former Hizbul Mujahideen commander
- Muhammad Nasir Dar, PAF Shaheed
- Ratan Nath Dhar Sarshar, Urdu novelist
- Sandeepa Dhar, Bollywood actress
- Sheila Dhar, Kashmiri Indian author and singer
- Sudhir Dar (1932–2019), cartoonist

=== Sportspeople ===
- Aleem Dar, Pakistani cricket umpire
- Asif Dar, boxer
- Haroon Rasheed, former Pakistani test cricketer and manager
- Munir Ahmed Dar, field hockey
- Nida Dar, female Pakistani test cricketer
- Raza Ali Dar, Pakistani Cricketer
- Rumeli Dhar, Indian cricketer
- Tabarak Dar, Hong Kong cricketer
- Tanvir Dar, field hockey

=== Politicians ===
- Javid Ahmad Dar, minister of Jammu Kashmir and NC leader
- Abdul Rashid Dar, Politician from Jammu and Kashmir
- Ali Mohammad Dar, MLA Jammu Kashmir
- Durga Prasad Dhar, ambassador of India to the Soviet Union
- Ishaq Dar, Deputy Prime Minister and Foreign Minister of Pakistan
- Kiran Imran Dar, politician and MNA for women from Punjab
- Maqbool Dar, politician from JK
- P. N. Dhar, Principal Secretary to Indira Gandhi in India
- Padma Nidhi Dhar, former CPIM MLA from Domjur Assembly in West Bengal
- Shaikh Rohale Asghar, Pakistani Member of Parliament
- Usman Dar, politician from Sialkot
- Virendra Mohan Dar (1758-1821) Kashmiri Pandit King and Jagirdar of Dar Village (Akhnoor Tehsil)

== See also ==
- Kashmiri Muslim tribes from Hindu lineage
