= Mohan Lal Kashmiri =

Indian diplomat (1812–1877)

Mohan Lal Kashmiri KLS
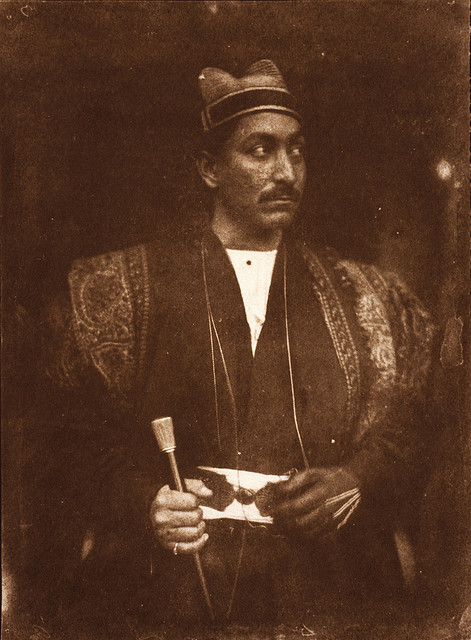
- Photo of Mohan Lal in 1844 by Robert Adamson and David Octavius Hill
- Born: 1812
- Died: 1877 (aged 64–65); Delhi, British Raj
- Other name: Ram Nath
- Occupations: Persian secretary (munshi), traveller and author
- Notable work: Life of the Amir Dost Mohammed Khan
- Spouse: Hyderi Begum

Mohan Lal Zutshi KLS (popularly known as Mohan Lal Kashmiri; 1812 – 1877) was an Indian traveler, diplomat, and author. He is credited as being an important player in the so-called Great Game—possibly the first notable Indian one. He also played a central role in the First Anglo-Afghan War of 1838–1842. His biography of Dost Mohammad Khan, the Emir of Afghanistan in Kabul, is a primary source on the war.

Mohan Lal's wife, Hyderi Begum, was a Muslim scholar. During the Indian Rebellion of 1857, she was said to have maintained a diary of events in Delhi.

== Early life and family ==
Mohan Lal (also called Ram Nath) was from a Zutshi family of Kashmiri Pandits. His great grandfather, Pandit Mani Ram, had a high rank at the Mughal Court in the reign of Shah Alam II. His father, Rai Brahm Nath, also known as Rae Budh Singh, worked for a time for Mountstuart Elphinstone on a diplomatic mission to Peshawar (1808–1809). Mohan Lal studied at the Delhi College, one of the first Indian students to be educated in the English curriculum there.

His only brother, Kedar Nath Zutshi, was a Deputy Collector in Ambala, Panjab Province, and died in 1855.

== Travels with Burnes ==
In 1831 Lieutenant (later Captain) Sir Alexander Burnes of the East India Company's service was deputed by the British Government to gather information in the countries lying between India and the Caspian. He was directed to appear as a private individual with a small retinue maintaining a character of poverty. Mohan Lal was engaged by Burnes primarily to assist him in his Persian correspondence and also because Burnes believed that his youth and creed would free him from all danger of his entering into intrigues with the people among whom he was going to travel. Mohan Lal's official title was munshi, but Mohan Lal preferred the title "Persian secretary".

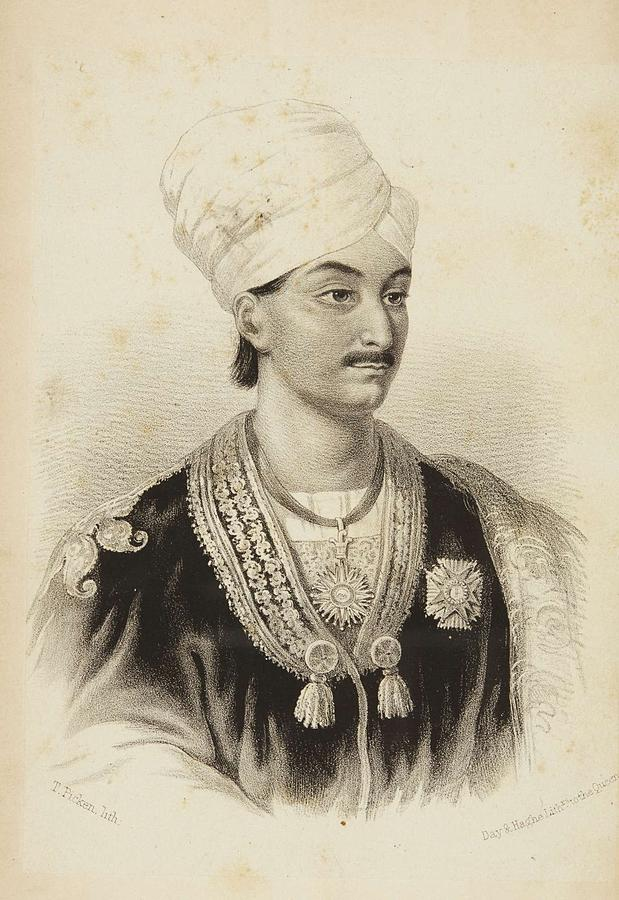
Mohan Lal, lithograph by Thomas Ashburton Picken

Alexander Burnes and Mohan Lal led an expedition to Central Asia in 1832–1834 for procuring political and military intelligence and became firm friends.

== First Anglo-Afghan War ==
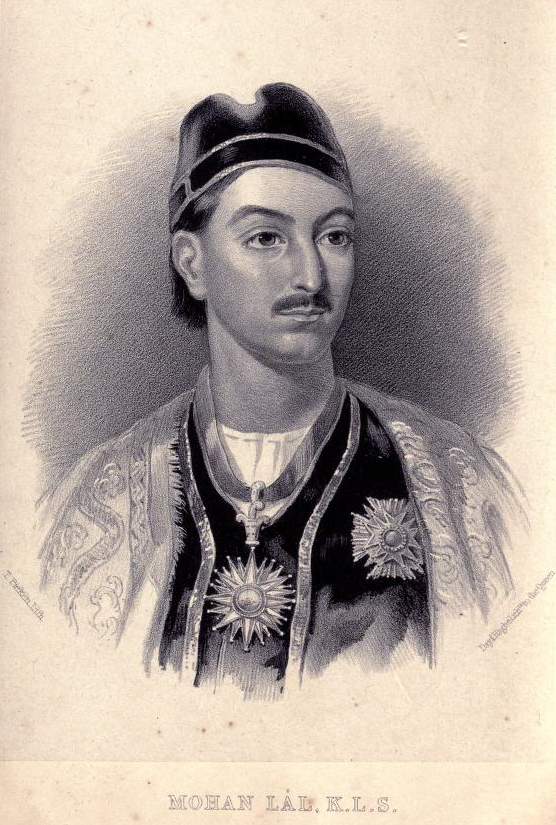
Etching of Mohan Lal by T. Picken (1846)

Later, Mohan Lal was the Commercial Agent for the British on the Indus and Political Assistant to Burnes in Kabul during the First Anglo-Afghan War. He witnessed the killing of Burnes by an angry mob in Kabul at the start of the war, which he described in a book he later wrote describing the Life of Amir Dost Mohammed Khan. He survived the massacres of 1841 and continued to keep Calcutta informed of events in the Afghan capital from the house of a merchant where he had taken refuge. His reports contained many strong and cogent criticisms of the behaviour of British Officers, and particularly Sir William Hay Macnaghten and General William Elphinstone.

Mohan Lal had learned Persian in Delhi and travelled in the garb of a Muslim, under the pseudonym of "Aga Hasan Jan" or as "Mirza Quli Kashmiri" in Persia and Afghanistan collecting information vital for his British superiors.

During the First Anglo-Afghan War, he was instrumental in setting up and expanding the British intelligence network in Afghanistan and is also alleged to have had a major hand in arranging the assassination, by poisoning, of Mir Masjidi Khan, a major Afghan resistance leader. He found out and handed over to the British authorities secret letters written by the rulers of Kandahar to Mehrab Khan, the ruler of Kalat, exhorting him not to allow passage to the invading British army. He managed to obtain the services of very important functionaries like Mohammed Tahir, Haji Khan Kakari, Abdul Majeed Khan, Akhundzada Ghulam and Mullah Nasooh in Kandahar and Sardar Abdul Rashid Khan, a nephew of the Emir Sardar Dost Mohammad Khan in Ghazni. He played a major role in securing the release of British prisoners held hostage in Bamiyan. He tried to bring peace between the British and the Afghans during such inflammatory situations.

== Later life ==
After the war, Mohan Lal travelled to Europe: In 1844 he sailed from Bombay via Egypt to Britain. During his time in Europe he met Queen Victoria, Prince Albert and Frederick William IV of Prussia, the latter gifting Mohan Lal an inscribed ivory carving of himself.

During his travels in Europe, Mohan Lal was photographed in 1844 by Robert Adamson and David Octavius Hill. Today his photo is contained in the Scottish National Portrait Gallery. While in Scotland, Mohan Lal was also portraited by the famous Scottish painter William Allan. The painting was exhibited by the Royal Scottish Academy in 1845 under the title "Mirza Mohun Lal, Persian secretary to the British Mission at Cabool, and who had previously accompanied Sir Alexander Burnes on his journey to Bokhara". The current location of the painting, which was sold on 18 April 1850, is unknown. In 1846 he attended the burial of Dwarkanath Tagore in London.

Mohan Lal retired at the age of 32, disappointed that he had not been properly rewarded for his contributions to the British cause in the First Anglo-Afghan War. His later years were spent in obscurity and financial troubles. His marriage to Hyderi Begum is said to have taken place in 1857. His wife was portraited by Paul Fischer.

Mohan Lal died in Delhi in 1877 in obscurity. According to his biographer Hari Ram Gupta, Mohan Lal is reported to have written an extensive diary until his death, but by 1943 its location was no longer known.

== Publications ==
- Lal, Mohen (1834). Journal of a tour through the Punjab, Afghanistan, Turkistan, Khorasan and part of Persia in company with Lt Burnes, and Dr Gerard. Calcutta.
- Lal, Mohan (1834). "A Brief Description of Herat". Journal of the Asiatic Society of Bengal. 3: 9–18.
- Lal, Mohan (1834). "Further Information regarfing the Siah Posh Tribe, or reputed descendants of the Macedonians". Journal of the Asiatic Society of Bengal. 3: 76–79.
- Lal, Mohan (1838). "Account of Kálá Bágh on the right bank of the Indus". Journal of the Asiatic Society of Bengal. 7: 25–27.
- Lal, Mohan (1838). "A brief account of the Origin of the Dáúd Putras, and of the power and birth of Baháwal Kha´n their Chief, on the bank of the Ghara and Indus". Journal of the Asiatic Society of Bengal. 7: 27–33.
- Mohan, Lal (1839). "On the trade of Khairpoor in Sinde". Reports and Papers, Political, Geographical, & Commercial Submitted to Government. Calcutta: Huttmann. pp. 36–38.
- Lal, Mohen (1846). Travels in the Panjab, Afghanistan, & Turkistan, to Balk, Bokhara, and Herat; and a visit to Great Britain and Germany. Calcutta: Wm. H. Allen & Co. Reprinted (1979): Lahore: Al Biruni, 1979
- Lal, Mohen (1846). Life of the Amir Dost Mohammed Khan, of Kabul: with his political proceedings towards the English, Russian, and Persian governments, including victory and disasters of the British Army in Afghanistan. London: Longman, Brown, Green and Longmans.

== Honours ==
- Knight of the Order of the Lion and the Sun (1833).
- Order of the Durrani Empire
