= Birbal Dhar =

19th-century Kashmiri noble

Birbal Dhar was a Kashmiri Pandit and noble in the early 19th century who led a deputation which persuaded Sikh ruler Maharaja Ranjit Singh to invade Kashmir Valley in 1819, effectively ending the Afghan and Muslim rule in Kashmir.

Birbal Dhar was the leading tax collector under the Afghan government from 1813 to 1819. After suffering from mistreatment on the hands of the Afghan governor Jabbar Khan Barakzai, he left for Punjab to sought help from Ranjit Singh in freeing Kashmir from Afghan rule. He was accompanied with several other Kashmiri nobles, most notably Mirza Pandit Dhar. He guided the Sikh army into Kashmir leading to the Sikh victory in the Battle of Shopian. After the Sikh conquest he was appointed on his earlier position again, but was dismissed on the allegations of corruption in 1821 which are said to be politically motivated and spent the rest of his life in obscurity.
