= Kuldeep Handoo =

Indian Wushu player

Personal information
- Full name: Kuldeep Kumar Handoo
- Nationality: Indian
- Citizenship: Indian
- Born: Srinagar, India
- Occupation(s): Wushu coach, former Wushu player, Police officer
- Employer: Jammu and Kashmir Police
- Spouse: Bhavneet Handoo

Sport
- Country: India
- Sport: Wushu
- Team: Indian Wushu team
Medal record
Wushu
Representing India
South Asian Wushu Championship
Gold medal – first place	2000 Kathmandu
South Asian Wushu Championship
Gold medal – first place	2003 New Delhi
Asian Wushu Championships
Bronze medal – third place	2004 Myanmar
National Games of India
Gold medal – first place	2007 Assam

Kuldeep Handoo is an Indian coach and a former Wushu player, who is the current national chief coach of the Wushu team in India. He was honored with the Dronacharya Award, becoming the first person to receive it from Jammu And Kashmir.

In December 2020, he was nominated by the Prime Minister of India as the Ambassador of Fit India Movement. He was born in Srinagar, India, and is a Kashmiri Pandit.

== Career ==
Kuldeep Handoo represented Jammu and Kashmir (state) at various national sports events. He won gold medals at the National Wushu Championship from 1995 to 2005. He had won a gold medal at the National Wushu Championship, which was held in Mizoram in the year 1995. In 1998, Kuldeep Handoo received a job as a sub-inspector in Jammu and Kashmir Police through sports quota. In 2000, he also won a bronze medal in boxing for the Jammu and Kashmir Police in the All India Police Games. He won a gold medal in the 2007 National Games. He won gold medals at the South Asian Wushu Championship in 2000 and 2003. In 2004, he won a bronze medal at the Asian Wushu Championships, held in Myanmar.

In 2006, he became a coach and was first appointed as the coach of the junior national Wushu team, later in the year 2010, he became the national chief coach of the Indian Wushu team. Under his guidance, India won three gold medals in the World Championships and one in the World cup, 27 silver and 57 bronze medals at various Wushu competitions including the Asian Games, World Wushu Championships, and World Cup.

== Personal life ==
Handoo is married to Bhavneet and has a son named, Bhavkul Born in 2012.

== Awards and recognition ==
- Dronacharya Award, by Government of India, 2020
- Sher-I-Kashmir Sports Award by the Government of Jammu and Kashmir
- Jammu and Kashmir Police Medal for meritorious service
- The Parshuram Award, the highest award in the field of sports given by the J&K State Sports Council
