= Kapil Kak =

Indian Air Force air marshal

Kapil Kak is a retired officer of the Indian Air Force, who rose to the rank of Air Vice Marshal. Kak is a Kashmiri Pandit. He was the Deputy Director at the Centre for Air Power Studies. He was awarded the Vishisht Seva Medal in 1981. Air Vice Marshal Kapil Kak is one of the many petitioners, who have moved the Supreme Court challenging the J&K Reorganisation Bill & the abrogation of Article 370.
