= Hrazdan (disambiguation) =

Hrazdan may refer to:

- Hrazdan, a city in Armenia
- Hrazdan (river) in Armenia
- Hrazdan stadium, a soccer stadium in Yerevan, Armenia
- Geghashen, Armenia
- Masis (village), Armenia
