= All India Kashmiri Samaj =

All India Kashmiri Samaj (AIKS) is an organisation for Kashmiri Pandits created to voice the issues associated with the Kashmiri Pandit diaspora Globally .

== Formation ==
All India Kashmiri Samaj is an independent organisation, a federal setup, constituting affiliated units throughout the globe. Kashmiri Samiti was one of the affiliated unit a few years back and disaffiliated because of certain reasons. The role of the Samaj was to create a nationwide awareness campaign about the communal violence against the pandits of Kashmir.

The AIKS has also been campaigning for adequate representation of Kashmiri Pandit community in state legislation and civic bodies of Jammu and Kashmir.

== Current activities ==
Amongst other activities, the AIKS has been working towards highlighting the suffering of the Kashmiri Pandit community, working towards providing timely and adequate relief for the migrants outside Jammu and Kashmir, implementation of the employment package for KP youth as well as providing a special package for Kashmiri Pandits that stayed behind in Kashmir during the exodus of the 1990s. In November 2012, the AIKS President Moti Kaul has made a demand to the Government of India for immediate enhancement of cash relief, implementation of employment package and better living conditions at migrant camp at Jagti in Jammu region of the Indian state of Jammu & Kashmir. Kaul has also accused the Indian Central Government and the J&K State government for being insensitive to the requirements of the displaced Kashmiri Pandit community and for not taking adequate action for 22 years.

AIKS has youth wing called AIKS GeNext & encourages youth of the community to join the organization to be the second line leaders to take over the leading role in due course of time.

Youth All India Kashmiri Samaj or YAIKS is a separate entity and has no links with AIKS.
