= Handoo =

Kashmiri Pandit surname

Handoo, also spelled as Handu, is a Kashmiri surname native to the Kashmir Valley in Jammu and Kashmir, India. It is found among Kashmiri Pandits and Kashmiri Muslims .

== Notable people ==
- Kuldeep Handoo, Indian wushu player
- Piyare Lal Handoo, Indian politician
- Tej Handu, Indian cricket umpire
