= Kak (surname) =

Kashmiri Pandit surname

Kak (Kashmiri: Sharada : 𑆑𑆳𑆑, Devanagari : काक, Nastaliq : کاک, romanized: kāk) is a Kashmiri Pandit surname originating in the Kashmir Valley of Jammu and Kashmir, India.

== Notable people ==
- Amar Nath Kak- Indian lawyer
- Bina Kak- Indian politician and actress
- Kapil Kak- Indian air force veteran
- Mushtaq Kak- Indian actor and director
- Ram Chandra Kak- Indian politician and archaeologist
- Sanjay Kak- Indian author, activist and filmmaker
- Siddharth Kak- Indian documentary filmmaker and producer
- Subhash Kak- Indian-American historian
