= Kachru =

Kashmiri Pandit surname

Kachru or Kachroo (Kashmiri: कचरू, کچرو) is a Kashmiri Pandit surname and clan. Kachrus originate from the Kashmir Valley of Jammu and Kashmir, India. Plenty of Kachrus retained their Hindu last name after they converted to Islam.

Notable people with the surname include:

- Braj Kachru (1923–2016), Indian linguist
- Shamit Kachru (born 1970), American theoretical physicist, son of Braj and Yamuna
- Yamuna Kachru (1933–2013), Indian linguist, wife of Braj
