= Haksar =

Haksar is a Kashmiri Pandit surname. They are native to the Kashmir Valley within the Indian state of Jammu and Kashmir and they have a long tradition of Indian administrative service based on fluency in a link language - Persian under the Mughuls and English under the British. In light of this fact, the Haksar family historically became a prominent administrative family in other parts of India, namely in Indore and Gwalior.

== Notable people ==
- Sir Kailash Narain Haksar (1878–1953), Indian minister
- P. N. Haksar (1913–1998), Indian minister
- Ajit Narain Haksar (1925–2005), Indian businessman
- A. N. D. Haksar (born 1933), Indian diplomat and prominent translator of Sanskrit classics
- Rajan Haksar, Indian actor
- Nandita Haksar (born 1955), Indian human rights activist, advocate, and writer
