= Kashmiri Pandits =

Hindu community native to the Kashmir Valley

- Kashmiri Pandits in Srinagar, c. 1895 CE

Total population
- 300,000 to 600,000 (est. living in the Kashmir Valley prior to 1990)

Regions with significant populations
- Kashmir Valley • Jammu • National Capital Region • Ladakh • Uttar Pradesh • Himachal Pradesh • Uttarakhand • Haryana • Rajasthan • Indian Punjab

Languages
- Sacred languages Sanskrit Ethnic language Kashmiri Other languages Hindi, Dogri, English

Religion
- Hinduism

Related ethnic groups
- Kashmiris (Kashmiri Hindus, Kashmiri Muslims), Saraswat Brahmins

The Kashmiri Pandits (also known as Kashmiri Brahmins) are a group of Kashmiri Hindus and a part of the larger Saraswat Brahmin community of India. They belong to the Pancha Gauda Brahmin group from the Kashmir Valley, located within the Indian union territory of Jammu and Kashmir. Kashmiri Pandits are Hindu Kashmiris native to the Kashmir Valley, and the only remaining indigenous Hindu population in the region after the large-scale conversion of the Valley's population to Islam beginning in the medieval period, comprising about 6% of the total Kashmiri population on the eve of Indian independence. Prompted by the growth of Islamic militancy in the valley, large numbers left in the exodus of the 1990s. Even so, small numbers remain.

== History ==
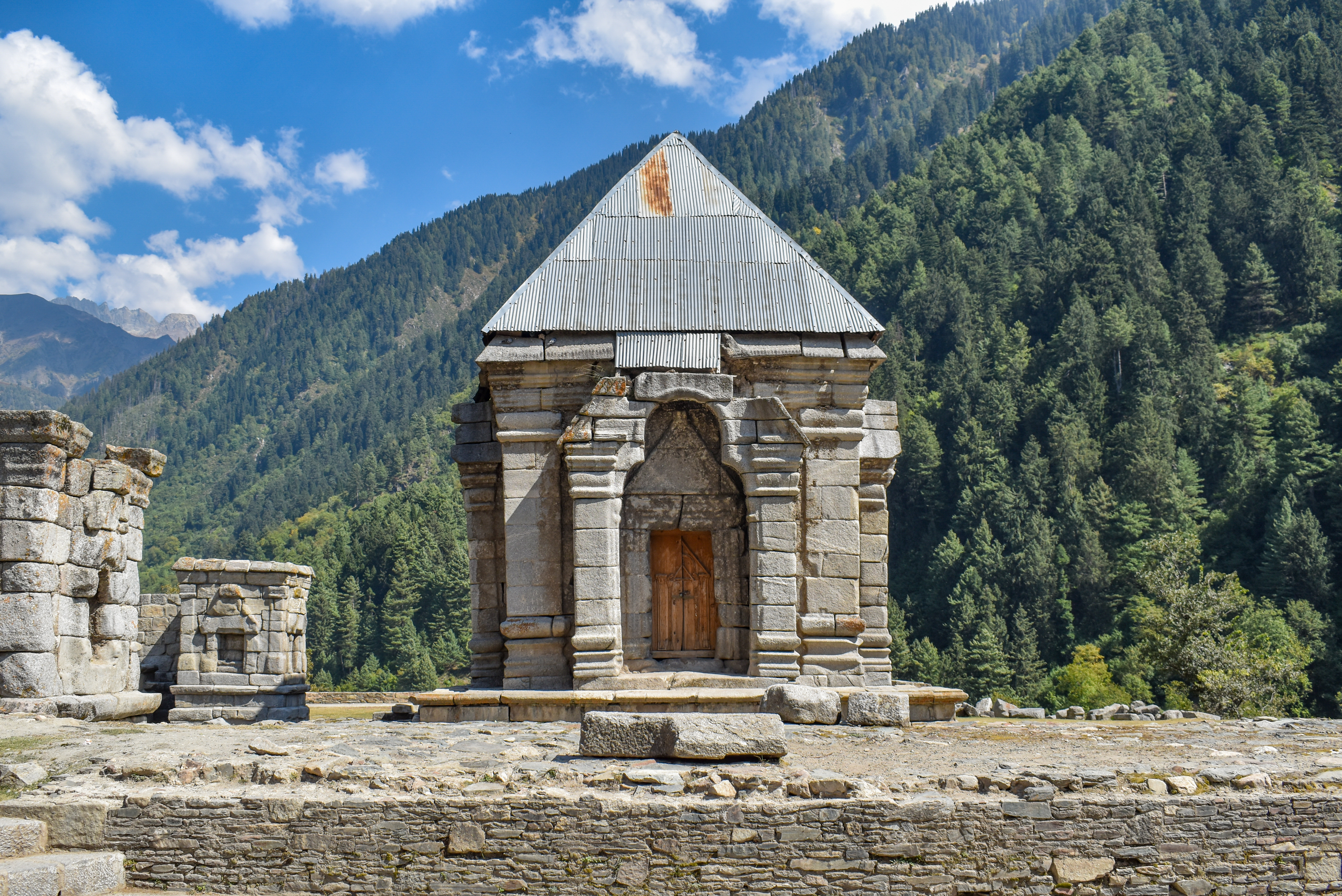
A c. 8th century CE Shaiva Hindu temple complex in the Himalayas of Kashmir

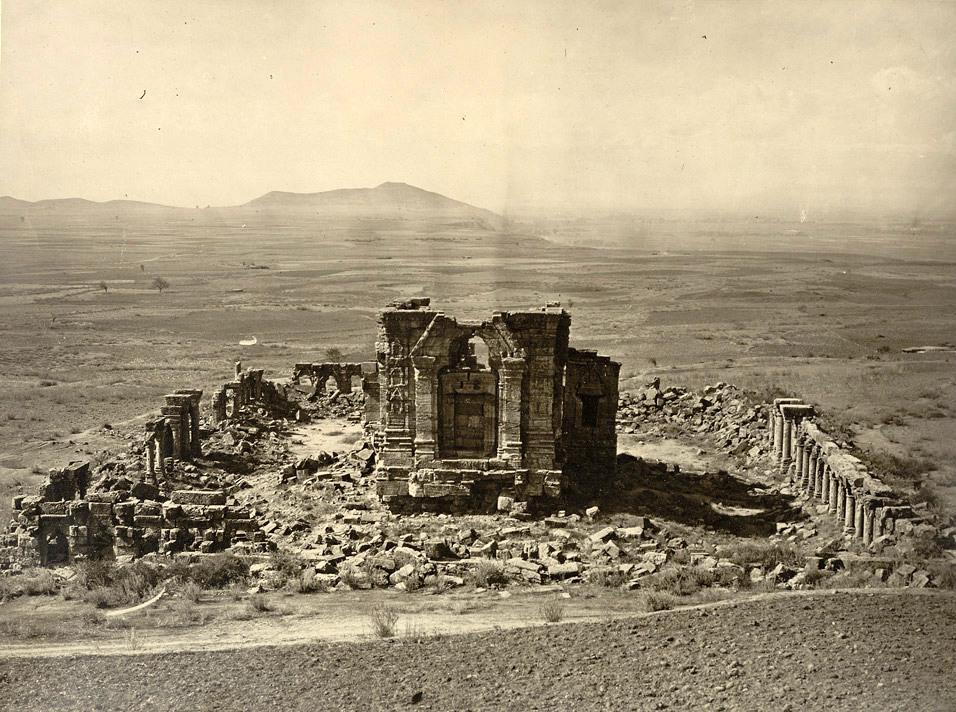
1869 photograph of the ruins of the Martand Sun Temple, built during Karkota rule

=== Early history ===
The Hindu caste system of the Kashmir region was influenced by the influx of Buddhism from the time of Asoka, around the third century BCE, and a consequence of this was that the traditional lines of varna were blurred, with the exception of that for the Brahmins. Another notable feature of early Kashmiri society was the relative high regard in which women were held when compared to their position in other communities of the period.

A historically contested region, Northern India was subject to attack from Turkic and Arab regimes from the eighth century onwards, but they generally ignored the mountain-circled Kashmir Valley in favour of easier pickings elsewhere. It was not until the fourteenth century that Muslim rule was finally established in the Valley and when this happened it did not occur primarily as a consequence of invasion so much as because of internal problems resulting from the weak rule and corruption endemic in the Hindu Lohara dynasty. Mohibbul Hasan describes this collapse as

The Dãmaras (feudal chiefs) grew powerful, defied royal authority, and by their constant revolts plunged the country into confusion. Life and property were not safe, agriculture declined, and there were periods when trade came to a standstill. Socially and morally too the court and the country had sunk to the depths of degradations.

The Brahmins had something to be particularly unhappy about during the reign of the last Lohara king, for Sūhadeva chose to include them in his system of onerous taxation, whereas previously they appear to have been exempted.

=== Medieval history ===
Zulju, who was probably a Mongol from Turkistan, wreaked devastation in 1320, when he commanded a force that conquered many regions of the Kashmir Valley. However, Zulju was probably not a Muslim. The actions of Sultan Sikandar Butshikan (1389–1413), the seventh Muslim ruler in Kashmir were also significant to the area. The Sultan has been referred to as an iconoclast because of his destruction of many non-Muslim religious symbols and the manner in which he forced the population to convert or flee. Many followers of the traditional religions who did not convert to Islam instead migrated to other parts of India. The migrants included some Pandits, although it is possible that some of this community relocated for economic reasons as much as to escape the new rulers. Brahmins were at that time generally being offered grants of land in other areas by rulers seeking to utilise the traditionally high literacy and general education of the community, as well as the legitimacy conferred upon them by association. The outcome of this shift both in population and in religion was that the Kashmir Valley became a predominantly Muslim region. It was during the 14th century that the Kashmiri Pandits likely split into their three subcastes: Guru/Bāchabat (priests), Jotish (astrologers), and Kārkun (who were historically mainly employed by the government). The majority of Kashmiri Brahmins are Kārkuns, and this is likely due to the conversion of the majority of Kashmiris to Islam, which led to a decrease in demand for Hindu priests, which led most Kashmiri Brahmins to seek secular employment.

Butshikan's heir, the devout Muslim Zain-ul-Abidin (1423–74), was tolerant of Hindus to the extent of sanctioning a return to Hinduism of those who had been forcibly converted to the Muslim faith, as well as becoming involved in the restoration of temples. He respected the learning of these Pandits, to whom he gave land as well as encouraging those who had left to return. He operated a meritocracy and both Brahmins and Buddhists were among his closest advisors.

=== Modern history ===
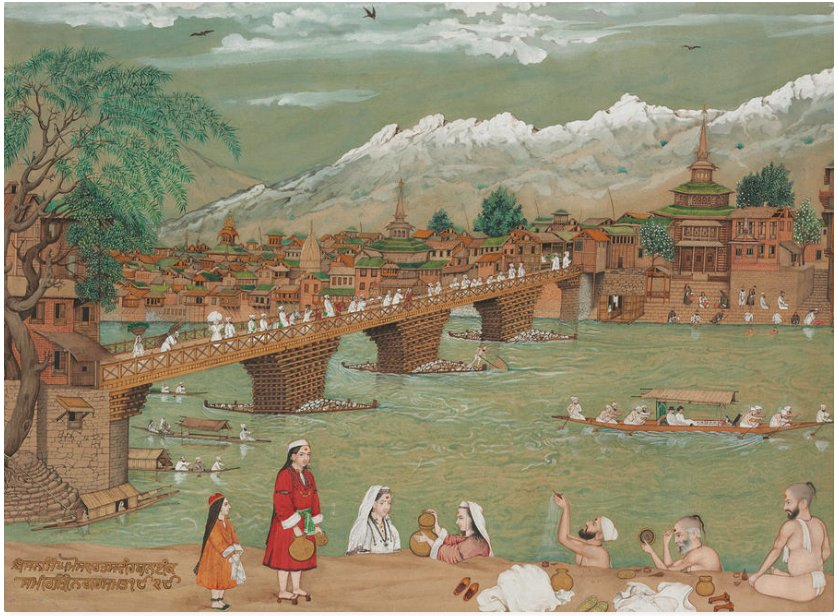
1872 painting depicting Srinagar, with Pandits in the foreground

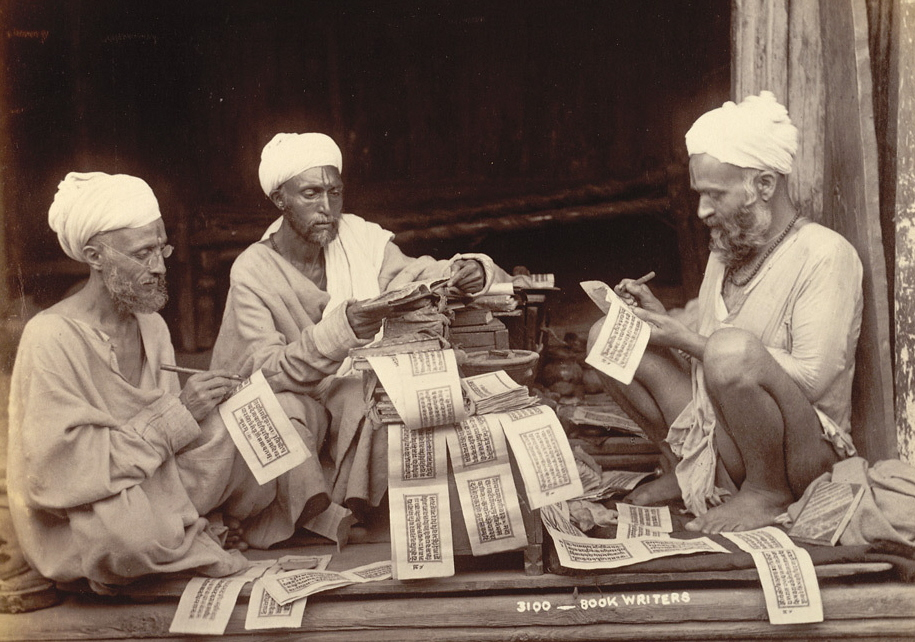
Three Hindu priests writing religious texts – 1890s, Jammu and Kashmir

==== Modern ====
D.L. Sheth, the former director of the Center for the Study of Developing Societies in India (CSDS), lists Indian communities that constituted the middle class and were traditionally "Urban and professional" (following professions like doctors, lawyers, teachers, engineers, etc.) immediately after Independence in 1947. This list included the Kashmiri Pandits, the Nagar Brahmins from Gujarat; the South Indian Brahmins; the Punjabi Khatris, and Kayasthas from northern India; Chitpawans and CKPs (Chandraseniya Kayastha Prabhus) from Maharashtra; the Probasi and the Bhadralok Bengalis; the Parsis and the upper crusts of Muslim and Christian communities. According to P.K. Verma, "Education was a common thread that bound together this pan Indian elite" and almost all the members of these communities could read and write English and were educated beyond school.

== Recent events ==
=== Exodus from Kashmir (1989–1995) ===
The Kashmiri Pandits had been a favoured section of the population of the valley during Dogra rule (1846–1947). 20 per cent of them left the valley as a consequence of the 1950 land reforms, and by 1981 the Pandit population amounted to 5 per cent of the total.

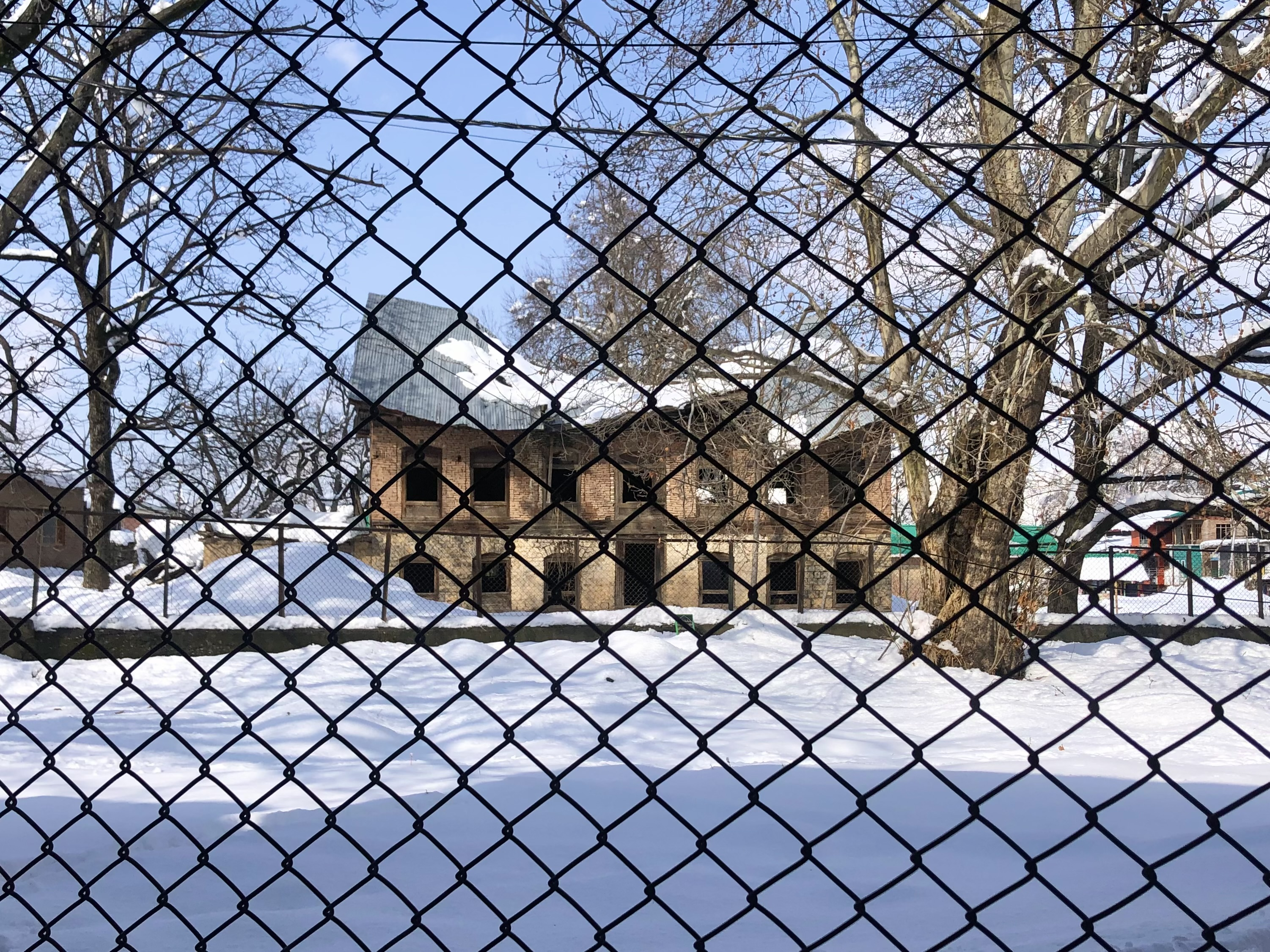
Ruins of a house abandoned by Kashmiri Hindus during the exodus in southern Kashmir Valley

They began to leave in much greater numbers in the 1990s during the eruption of militancy, following persecution and threats by radical Islamists and militants. The events of 19 January 1990 were particularly vicious. On that day, mosques issued declarations that the Kashmiri Pandits were Kafirs and that the males had to leave Kashmir, convert to Islam or be killed. Those who chose to the first of these were told to leave their women behind. The Kashmiri Muslims were instructed to identify Pandit homes so they could be systematically targeted for conversion or killing.

According to a number of authors, approximately 100,000 of the total Kashmiri Pandit population of 140,000 left the valley during the 1990s. Other authors have suggested a higher figure for the exodus, ranging from the entire population of over 150,000, to 190,000 of a total Pandit population of 200,000, to a number as high as 800,000. Many of the refugee Kashmiri Pandits have been living in abject conditions in refugee camps of Jammu. The government has reported on the terrorist threats to Pandits still living in the Kashmir region.

Some Hindus across India tried to help the Pandits. Bal Thackeray from Maharashtra got seats reserved in engineering colleges for the children of these Pandits. He was one of the first persons to help them after which Punjab also followed suit.

In 2009 the Oregon Legislative Assembly passed a resolution to recognise 14 September 2007, as Martyrs Day to acknowledge ethnic cleansing and campaigns of terror inflicted on non-Muslim minorities of Jammu and Kashmir by terrorists seeking to establish an Islamic state.

In 2010, the Government of Jammu and Kashmir noted that 808 Pandit families, comprising 3,445 people, were still living in the Valley and that financial and other incentives put in place to encourage others to return there had been unsuccessful. According to a J&K government report, 219 members of the community had been killed in the region between 1989 and 2004 but none thereafter. The local organisation of pandits in Kashmir, Kashmir Pandit Sangharsh Samiti after carrying out a survey in 2008 and 2009, said that 399 Kashmiri Pandits were killed by insurgents from 1990 to 2011 with 75% of them being killed during the first year of the Kashmiri insurgency.

The exiled community had hoped to return after the situation improved. They have not done so because the situation in the Valley remains unstable and they fear a risk to their lives.

As of October 2015, only 1 Kashmiri Pandit family returned to the Kashmir valley since 1990 according to the Jammu & Kashmir government despite the financial assistance being given for rehabilitation. As of 2016, a total of 1,800 Kashmiri Pandit youths have returned to the valley since the announcing of Rs. 1,168-crore package in 2008 by the UPA government.

=== PRC and the JKMIP Acts ===
There are zones set up with offices for relief. Many Orders, Circulars and recommendations have been issued for relief of Kashmiri Pandits.

The Jammu And Kashmir Migrant Immovable Property (Preservation, Protection And Restraint on Distress Sales) Act, 1997, provides that "Any person who is an unauthorised occupant or recipient of any usufruct of any immovable property of the migrant shall pay to the migrant such compensation for the period of unauthorised occupation and in such a manner as may be determined by the District Magistrate."

=== Socio-political organisations ===
Following the migration of the Kashmiri Pandit community, various socio-political organisations have sprung up to represent the cause of the displaced community. The most prominent among these are the All India Kashmiri Samaj or AIKS, All India Kashmiri Pandit conference, Panun Kashmir & Kashmiri Samiti. These organisations are involved in rehabilitation of the community in the valley through peace negotiations, mobilisation of human rights groups and job creation for the Pandits.

Panun Kashmir has made demands for a separate homeland for the community in the southern part of Kashmir. Ikkjutt Jammu, a political party in Jammu and Kashmir, advocates for two Union Territories in Kashmir, one being Panun Kashmir for Kashmiri Hindus.

== Population distribution ==
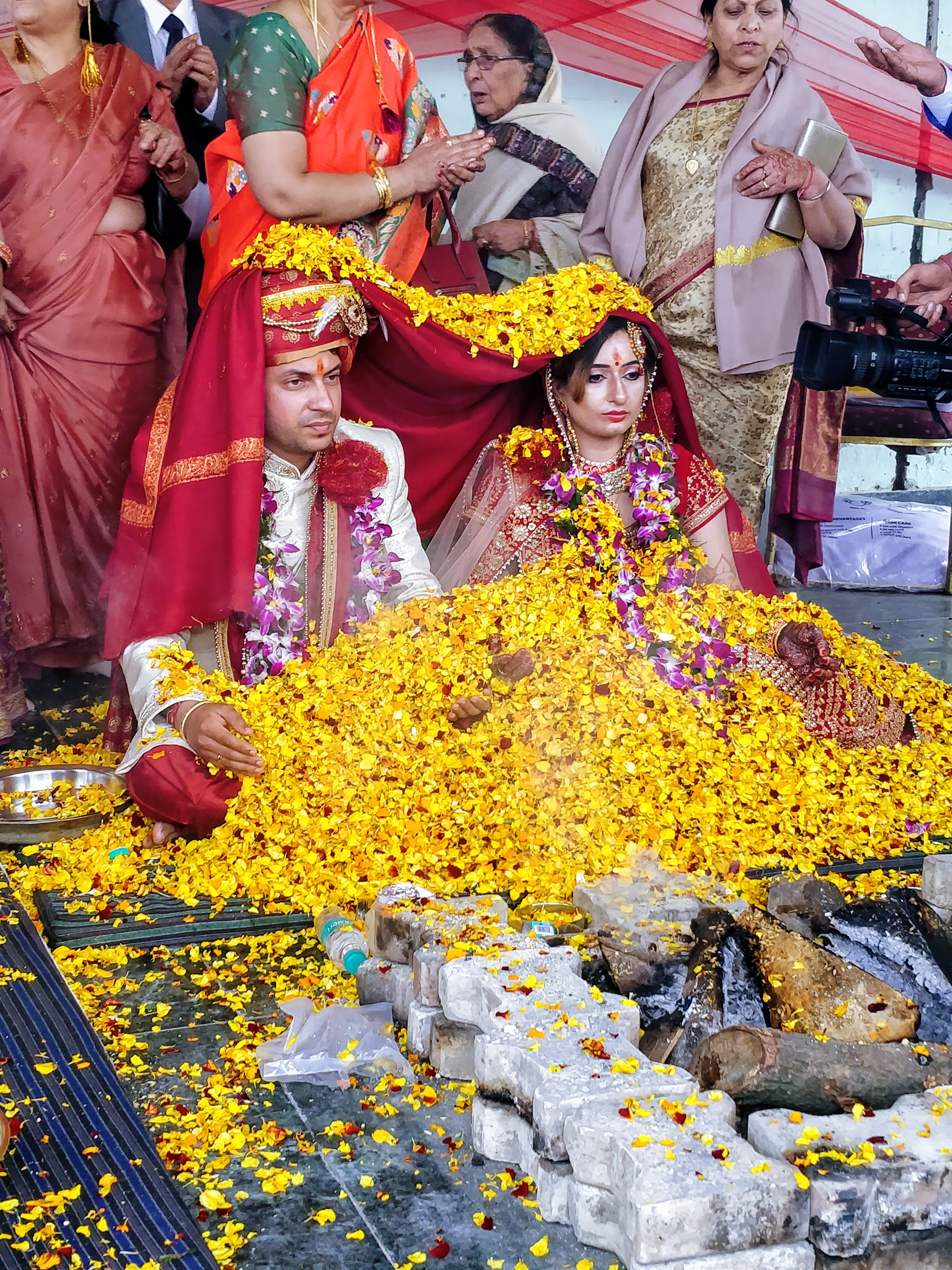
Kashmiri couple getting married in a traditional ceremony at Jammu

According to the 1941 census, there were 78,800 Kashmiri Pandits in the Kashmir Valley. They were distributed into the two districts of Valley, the Baramulla district, where Hindus constituted 2.1 per cent of the population; 12,919 Hindus out of 612,428 total. and the Anantnag district, where they were 7.84 per cent of the population.

Scholar Christopher Snedden states that the Pandits made up about 6 per cent of the Kashmir Valley's population in 1947. By 1950, their population declined to 5 per cent as many Pandits moved to other parts of India due to the uncompensated land redistribution policy, the unsettled nature of Kashmir's accession to India and the threat of economic and social decline.

In the 1981 census, the Kashmir Division had 124,078 Hindus, the majority of whom were Pandits. Scholar Alexander Evans estimates by 1990, there would have been 160,000–170,000 Pandits in the Kashmir Valley.

Following the 1989 insurgency, a great majority of Pandits felt threatened and left the Kashmir Valley for other parts of India. A large number settled in the Jammu Division of the State and the National Capital Region of India. Some emigrated to other countries entirely. By 2011, only an estimated 2,700-3,400 Pandits remained in the Kashmir Valley.

According to Indian government, more than 60,000 families are registered as Kashmiri migrants including some Sikh and Muslim families. Most families were resettled in Jammu, NCR and other neighbouring states.

== Society and culture ==
=== Religious beliefs ===
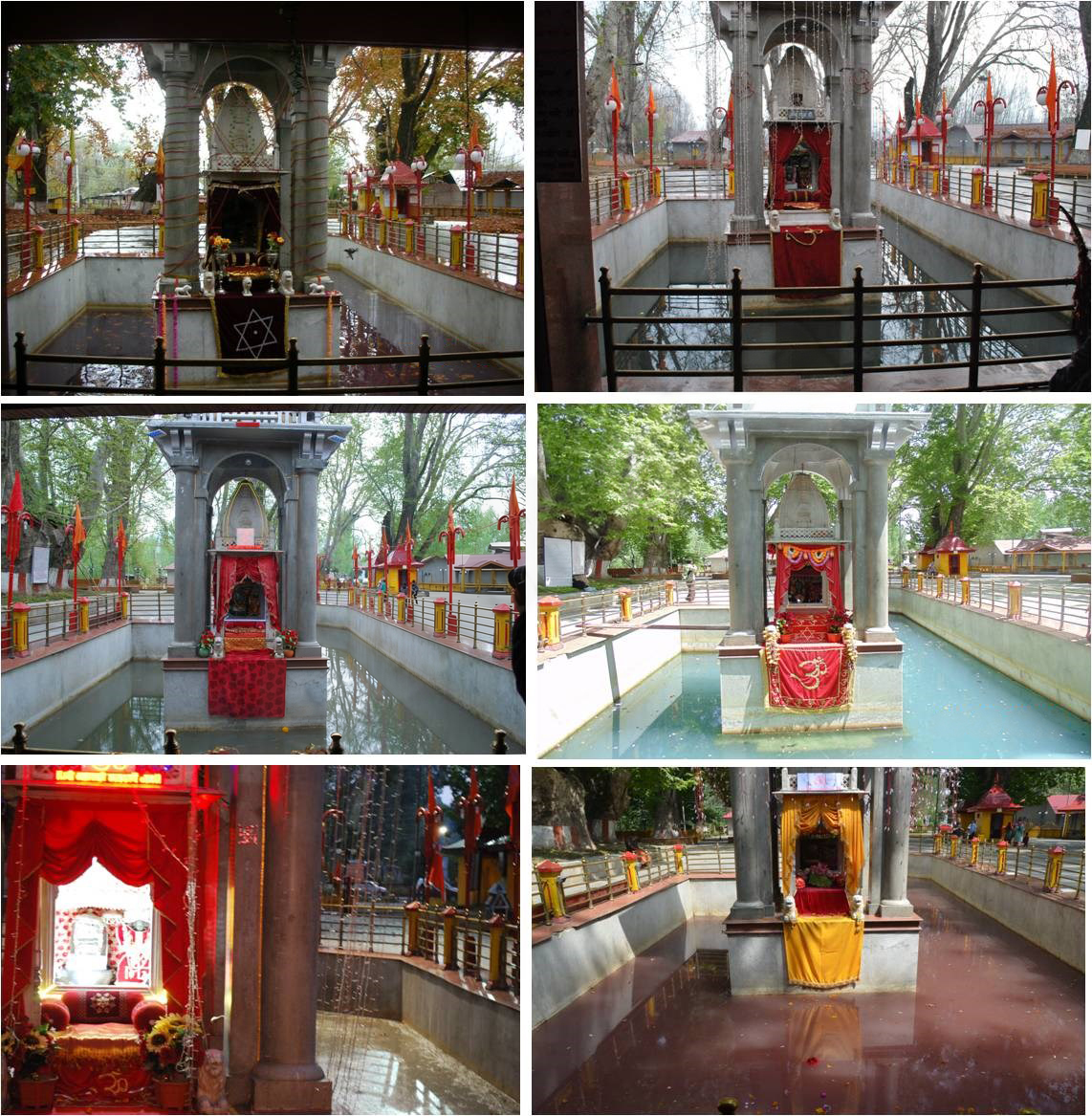
Divine Colours of the Divine Spring

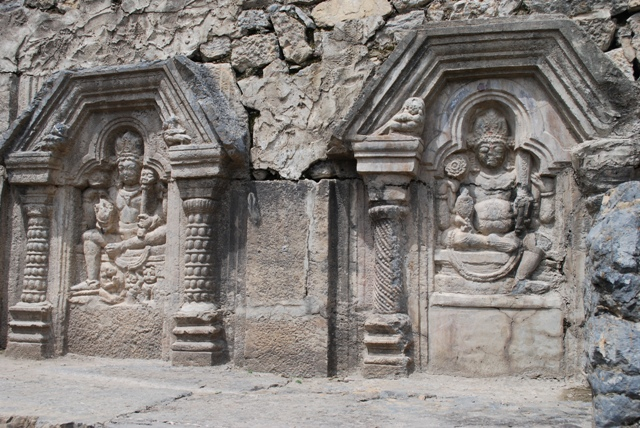
Ruins of Martand temple

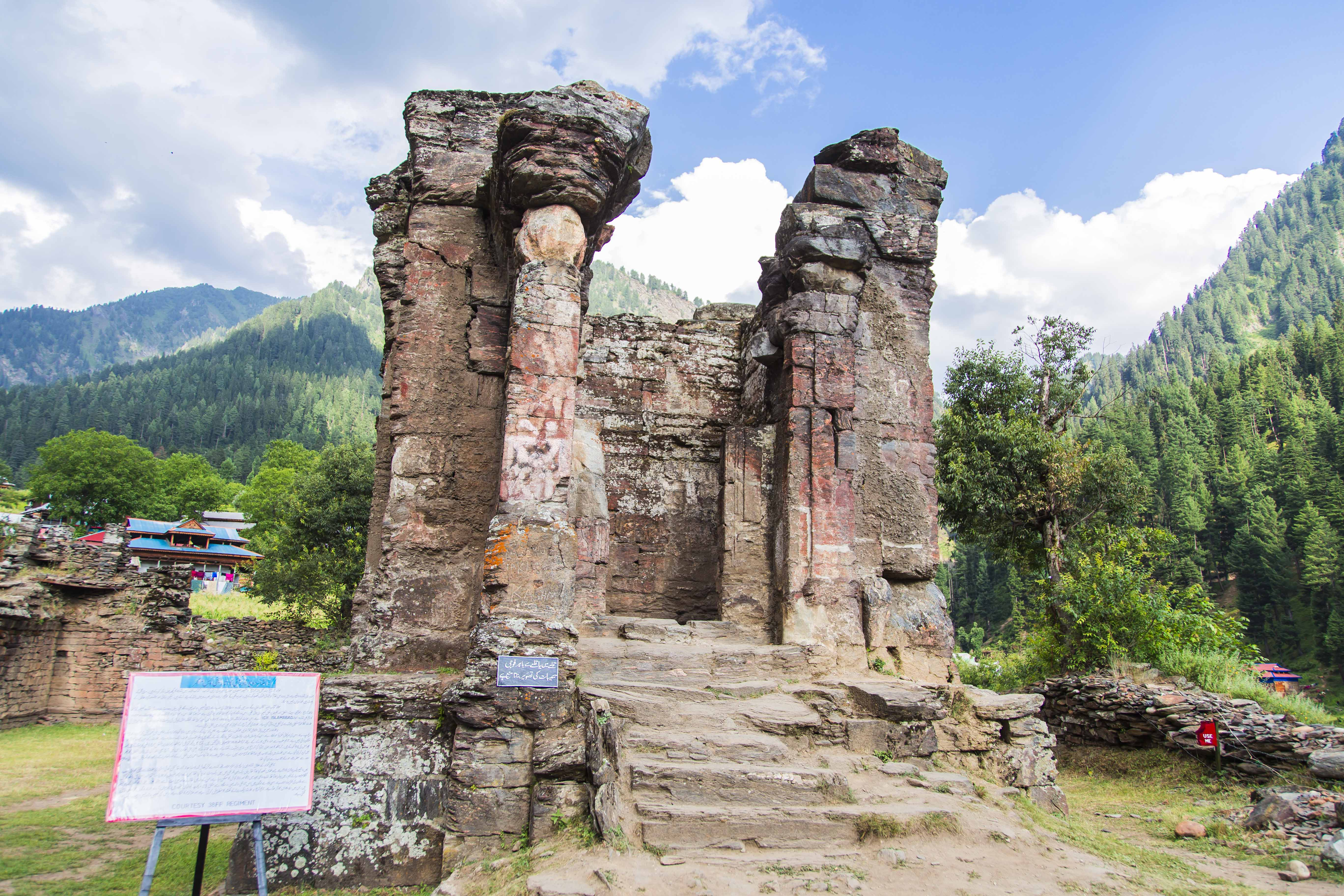
Sharda Peeth

Kashmir has also been a land of Sun worship with shrines such as Martand Sun Temple established by Lalitaditya Muktapida. Sun worship is believed to have been brought into Kashmir by Kushan kings from Iran. Lalitaditya's predecessor, Ranaditya, is said to have built the first sun temple. Wanvun singing is an integral part of Kashmiri Pandit religious ceremonies.

==== Pilgrimage sites ====
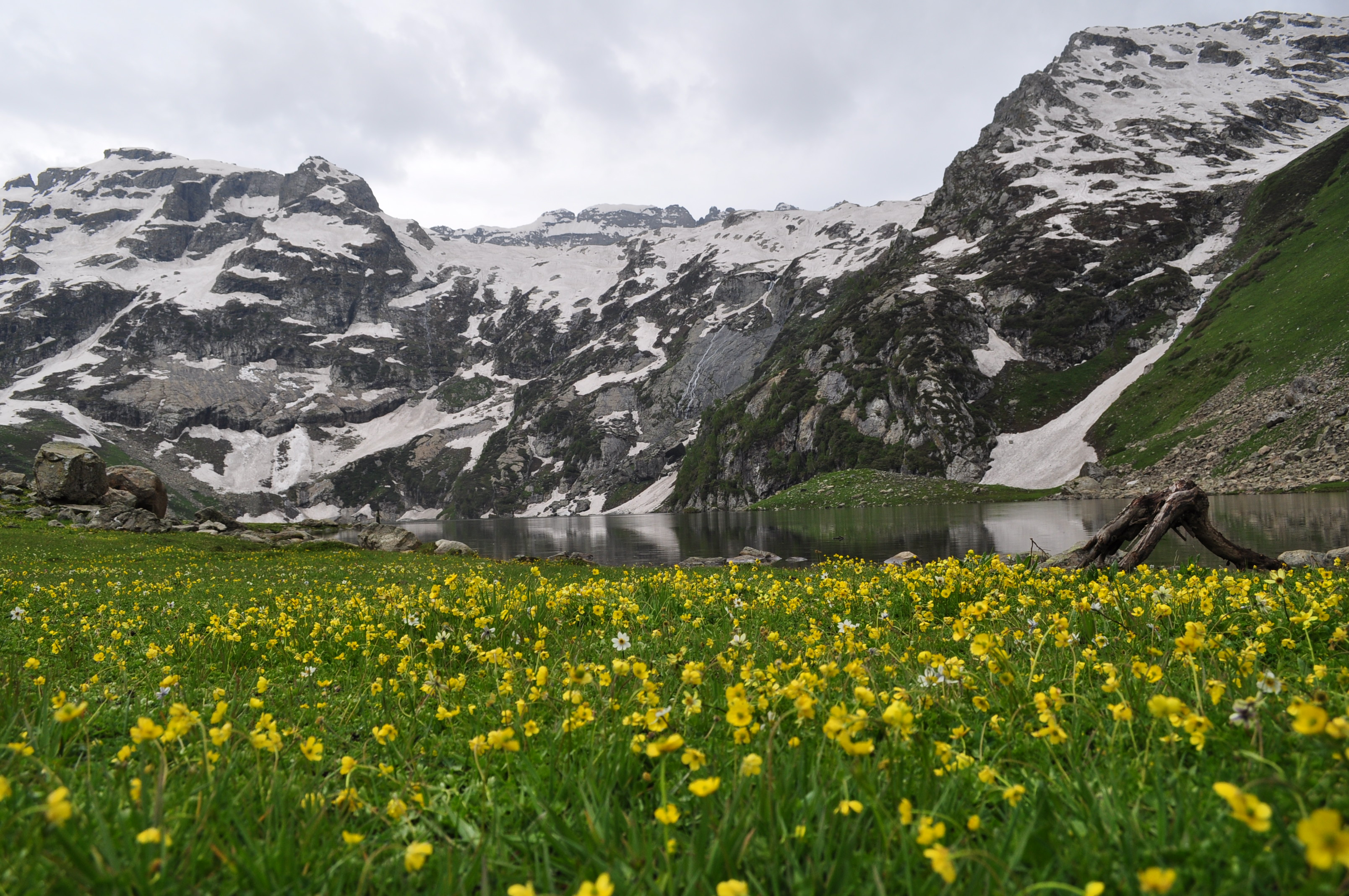
Mount Harmukh

Harmukh is traditionally revered by Kashmiri Pandits and in 2009 there was an attempt by them to revive pilgrimages to the site. The Mata Kheerbhawani temple shrine in Srinagar, considered one of the holiest Hindu shrines, saw the largest gathering of Kashmiri Pandits in the Kashmir valley in 2012. The shrine is located in Tullamulla village, 24 km from Srinagar in Ganderbal district.

==== Festivals ====
The Kashmiri Pandits festivals include Shivratri (or Herath in the Kashmiri language) which is one of the major festivals of Kashmiri Pandits. Navreh or the Kashmiri lunar new year is also an important Pandit festival.

=== Culture ===
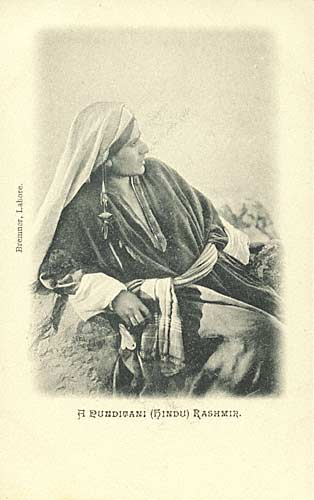
A Kashmiri pandit woman, photograph by Fred Bremner, circa ~1900

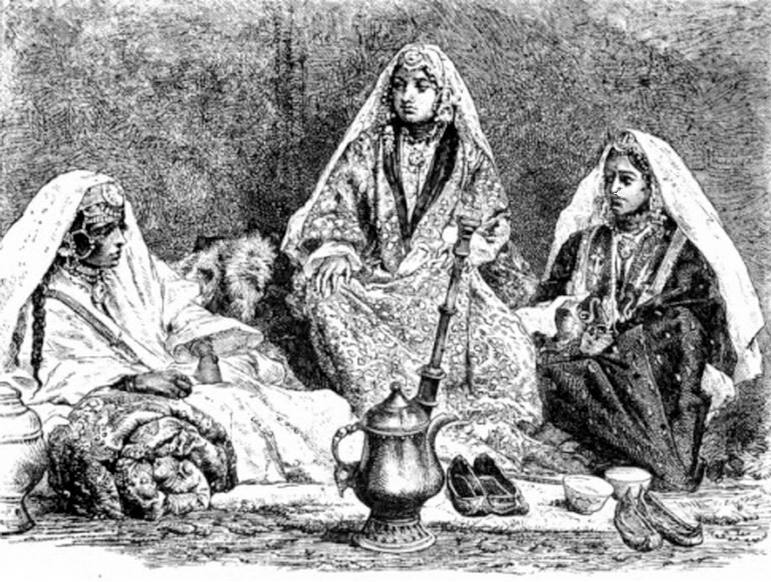
An artpiece of three Kashmiri Pandit women

==== Dress ====
Kshemendra's detailed records from the eleventh century describe many items of which the precise nature is unknown. It is clear that tunics known as kanchuka were worn long-sleeved by men and in both long- and half-sleeved versions by women. Caps were worn, as well as a type of turban referred to as a shirahshata, while footwear consisted of leather shoes and boots, worn with socks. Some items were elaborate, such as the peacock shoes – known as mayuropanah – worn by followers of fashion, and steel-soled shoes adorned with floral designs, lubricated internally with beeswax. They also wear the mekhalā, which is a type of girdle.

There are many references to the wearing of jewellery by both sexes, but a significant omission from them is any record of the dejihor worn on the ear by women today as a symbol of their being married. Kaw has speculated that this item of jewellery may not have existed at the time. The texts also refer to both sexes using cosmetics, and to the women adopting elaborate hairstyles. Men, too, might adopt stylish arrangements and wear flowers in their hair, if they had the financial means to do so.

==== Music ====
Henzae is an ancient traditional form of singing practised by Kashmiri Pandits at their festivals. It appears to have archaic features that suggest it is the oldest form of Kashmiri folk singing.

==== Diet ====
The Kashmiri Pandits have a tradition of consuming meat, including mutton and fish, but they obey restrictions laid down by the shastras of not eating the meat of forbidden animals such as beef and pork. Frederick J. Simoons says that according to some reports, Kashmiri Pandits also consume fish as part of their diet.

==== Subcastes ====
The Kashmiri Pandits are divided into three subcastes: Guru/Bāchabat (priests), Jotish (astrologers), and Kārkun (who were historically mainly employed by the government). All three subcastes interdine and interteach, but only the Jotish and Kārkun subcastes intermarry.

=== Krams ===
Kashmiri Hindus are Saraswat Brahmins and are known by the exonym Pandit. Kashmiri Hindus society reckons descent patrilineally. Certain property and titles may be inherited through the male line, but certain inheritances may accrue through the female line.

Some prominent Kashmiri Pandit krams include:

- Bhat (or Bhatt)
- Dhar
- Lone
- Kaul
- Raina
- Kher
- Kak
- Kachru
- Kichlu
- Mantu (or Mantoo/Mintoo)
- Haksar
- Handoo
- Ganai
- Tikoo
- Tantray
- Trisal
- Mattoo
- Pandit
- Rajguru
- Bhan
- Bakshi
- Bazaz
- Rather
- Razdan
- Munshi
- Sapru
- Zutshi
- Magre (or Magray)
- Yatoo
- Wali
- Wazir
- Madan
- Wain

== Notable Kashmiri Pandits ==
- Nehru family, Indian political family (Note: Motilal Nehru was expelled from the caste in 1899 for travelling to England and refusing to perform the purification ceremony. The Nehrus were stigmatised by other Kashmiri Pandits as late as 1919 and there were controversies about Nehru women dining with other Kashmiri pandit women.)
- P. N. Haksar, bureaucrat and diplomat
- Tej Bahadur Sapru, freedom fighter, lawyer, and politician
- Tapishwar Narain Raina, ninth Chief of the Army Staff of Indian Army
- Sanjiv Bhatt, Indian Police Service officer of the Gujarat-cadre
- Jeevan, actor
- Raaj Kumar, actor
- Anupam Kher, actor
- Kunal Khemu, actor
- Mohit Raina, actor
- Rajendranath Zutshi, actor
- Manav Kaul, actor
- Rahul Pandita, Indian author and journalist
- Sandeepa Dhar, actor
- Ashoke Pandit, filmmaker, social activist
- Suresh Raina, Indian cricketer
- R. N. Kao, founder and first secretary of R&AW
- Triloki Nath Kaul, Indian diplomat
- Mohan Lal Zutshi, traveller, diplomat, and author, and an important player in the Great Game
- Sampat Prakash, trade union leader
- Samay Raina, Indian stand-up comedian
- Aditya Dhar, Indian film director, screenwriter, and producer

== See also ==
- Buddhism in Kashmir
- Kashmir Shaivism philosophy
- Dardic people
- Hari Parbat
- List of Jammu and Kashmir related articles

== Bibliography ==
- Census of India, 1941, Volume XXII – Jammu and Kashmir, Parts I & II, The Ranbir Government Press, 1943
- Census of India, 1941, Volume XXII – Jammu and Kashmir, Part III (PDF), The Ranbir Government Press, 1943
- Bose, Sumantra (1997), The Challenge in Kashmir: Democracy, self-determination, and a just peace, New Delhi: Sage Publications, in association with The Book Review Literary Trust, ISBN 978-0-8039-9350-1
- Evans, Alexander (2002). "A departure from history: Kashmiri Pandits, 1990-2001". Contemporary South Asia. 11 (1): 19–37. doi:10.1080/0958493022000000341. S2CID 145573161.
- Madan, T. N. (2008), "Kashmir, Kashmiris, Kashmiriyat: An Introductory Essay", in Rao, Aparna (ed.), The Valley of Kashmir: The Making and Unmaking of a Composite Culture?, Delhi: Manohar. Pp. xviii, 758, pp. 1–36, ISBN 978-81-7304-751-0
- Malik, Iffat (2005), Kashmir: Ethnic Conflict, International Dispute, Karachi and Oxford: Oxford University Press. Pp. xxvi, 392, ISBN 0-19-579622-5
- Metcalf, Barbara; Metcalf, Thomas R. (2006), A Concise History of Modern India (Cambridge Concise Histories), Cambridge and New York: Cambridge University Press. Pp. xxxiii, 372, ISBN 0-521-68225-8.
- Rai, Mridu (2004), Hindu Rulers, Muslim Subjects: Islam, Rights, and the History of Kashmir, Princeton University Press/Permanent Black. Pp. xii, 335., ISBN 81-7824-202-8
- Zutshi, Chitralekha (2004), Languages of Belonging: Islam, Regional Identity, and the Making of Kashmir, C. Hurst & Co. Publishers, ISBN 978-1-85065-700-2
