= Mattoo =

Kashmiri surname

Mattoo, also spelled Mattu, is a Kashmiri clan and surname. They are native to the Kashmir Valley within the Jammu & Kashmir, India.

Notable people who bear the name, but are not necessarily associated with the clan, include:

- Amitabh Mattoo, academic
- Mehraj Mattoo, banker
- Priyadarshini Mattoo, murder victim
- Leenesh Mattoo, actor
- Junaid Azim Mattu, politician
- Sanna Irshad Mattoo, photojournalist
