= Razdan (surname) =

Kashmiri Pandit surname

Razdan (Kashmiri: Sharada : 𑆫𑆳𑆘𑇊𑆢𑆳𑆤, Devanagari : राज़दान, Nastaliq : رازدان, romanized: rāzdān) is a Kashmiri Pandit surname of old Kashmir, now the Kashmir Valley of Jammu and Kashmir, India. Razdan, along with Kak, is the oldest surname in Kashmir's history.

== Notable people ==
- Karan Razdan (b. 1961) - an Indian actor, writer and director, who works in Bollywood
- Nidhi Razdan (b. 1977) - an Indian journalist and television personality.
- Rajni Razdan - was an Indian Administrative Service Officer of 1973 batch of Haryana cadre.
- Shefali Razdan Duggal (b. 1971) -an Indian-born American political activist.
- Soni Razdan (b. 1956) - a British actress and film director who works in Hindi films.
- Virendra Razdan (1950 – 2003) - was an Indian actor.
- Vivek Razdan (b. 1969) - a former Indian cricketer.
