= Madan (surname) =

Madan/Madaan/Madhan is a Hindu surname, and can indicate various castes including Vaishya. In India, it is found among Parsis, Kashmiri Pandits, Punjabi Aroras and Sindhi Lohanas. It is also found among Europeans.

== Notable people ==
Notable people with the surname include:

- Arthur Cornwallis Madan (1846–1917), British linguist of African languages (Swahili and others) and UMCA missionary (Zanzibar, Rhodesia)
- Barkha Madan, Indian model, actress and producer
- Chandan Madan (born 1982), Indian cricketer
- Dilip Madan, American financial economist
- Disha Madan, Indian actress and influencer
- Falconer Madan (1851–1935), librarian of the Bodleian Library of Oxford University
- Frances Maria Cowper (née Madan; sometimes known as Maria Frances; 1726–1797), British poet
- Geoffrey Madan (1895–1947), English belletrist and collector of aphorisms
- Jamshed Madan (1915–1986), Indian cricketer
- Jamshedji Framji Madan (1856–1923), Indian film and theatre magnate, one of the pioneers of film production in India
- J.J. Madan, Indian cinema owner and director
- José Óscar Sánchez Madan (born 1961), Cuban journalist
- Judith Madan (1702–1781), English poet
- Martin Madan (1726–1790), English barrister, clergyman and writer
- Martin Madan (politician) (1700–1756), groom of the bedchamber to Frederick, Prince of Wales
- Mohit Madaan (born 1988), Indian actor
- Moti Lal Madan (born 1939), Indian biotechnology researcher, veterinarian, academic and administrator
- Parakh Madan (born 1983), Indian actress
- Paaras Madaan, Indian actor
- Pessie Madan (1916–2015), Indian Army officer and defence technology advocate
- Radhika Madan (born 1995), Indian actress
- Spencer Madan (1729–1813), English churchman
- Triloki Nath Madan (born 1933), Indian academic
- Nikhil Madaan Politician, Former Mayor and currently serving as MLA of Sonipat District of Haryana State
