= Kichlu =

Kashmiri Pandit surname

Kichlu, also spelt Kichloo, Kitchlu, Kitchloo or Kitchlew is a Kashmiri last name and clan, originating in the Kashmir Valley of the Indian union territory of Jammu and Kashmir.

== Notable people ==
- Vijay Kichlu- Indian classical music singer
- Saifuddin Kitchlew- Indian independence movement activist
