= Zutshi =

Kashmiri Pandit surname

Zutshi is a Kashmiri Pandit clan and surname, originating from the Kashmir Valley of Jammu and Kashmir, administered by India.

== Notable people ==
- Geeta Zutshi (born 1956), Indian athlete
- Prithvi Zutshi, Indian actor
- Rajendranath Zutshi (born 1961), Indian actor
- Mohan Lal Kashmiri (1812–1877), Indian traveler
- Chitralekha Zutshi, Indian historian
