= Lone (surname) =

Lone ( Kashmiri = لون ) is a Kashmiri surname found among Kashmiri Muslims.

== Notable people ==
- Abdul Ghani Lone (1932–2002), Kashmiri politician and separatist leader
- Ghulam Nabi Lone, Kashmiri politician from the Jammu and Kashmir Peoples Democratic Party
- John Lone (born 1952), Hong Kong-born American actor
- Lars Lone, American politician from Wyoming
- Mohammad Akbar Lone Kashmiri politician from the National Conference party
- Sajjad Gani Lone (born 1967), Kashmiri politician and MLA
- Salim Lone, Kenyan journalist
- Steinar Lone (born 1955), Norwegian translator
- Austin de Lone (born 1956), American musician
- Erika deLone (born 1972), American tennis player
- William H. DeLone (born 1946), American organizational theorist
- Hugh O'Lone (ca 1836 – 1871), American-born saloon keeper and political figure in Canada
