= Rajguru =

Rajguru, also spelled as Rajaguru or Rajyaguru, is an ancient title and surname of the Indian subcontinent which means "royal priest".

== Notable people ==
- Rajguru Aggavamsa Mahathera, Bangladeshi Buddhist
- Rajguru Priyo Ratana Mahathera, Buddhist guru
- Rajaguru Subramanian, Indian Kabaddi player
- Basavaraj Rajguru (1917–1991), Hindustani singer
- Hari Rajguru (born 1939), Indian cricketer
- Jayi Rajaguru (1739–1806), Indian independence activist
- Prakash Rajguru (1939—2006), Indian cricketer
- Rinku Rajguru (born c. 2000), Indian film actress
- Saranga Rajaguru (born 1992), Sri Lankan cricketer
- Satyanarayana Rajguru, Indian litterateur, epigraphist and historian
- Shaktipada Rajguru (1922–2014), Indian Bengali writer
- Shivaram Rajguru (1908–1931), Indian revolutionary
- Wickremasinghe Rajaguru (born 1938), Inspector General of the Sri Lanka Police
