= Wani (surname) =

Family name

Wani/Vani (or Wanie, Wyne, Wain) is a surname found throughout India and Pakistan, especially in Jammu and Kashmir, Punjab and Maharashtra. Both Wain (pronounced like wine with a nasal 'n') and Wani/Vani are acceptable pronunciations.

Historians agree that the Wani/Wain belong to the merchant caste Bania and were originally Kashmiri Hindus. Even among those Wani/Wain who converted from Hinduism to Islam, the profession of these people remained primarily in trade and commerce. Wani caste has been associated with trade and business and therefore assigned with Vaishya order. Tareekh-e-Hassan has mentioned that Wani Muslims are one of the highest castes in the region. Wanis also use Khawaja as their prefix and Wains are well respected and have one of the top pedigrees among tribes.

Wains are divided into several sub-castes such as Kesar-Wani (those who sell saffron), Tal-Wain (those who sell oil), Pui-Wani, Baand-Wani, Bas-Wani, Tarangar-Wani, Kakar-Wani, and Par-Wani. Because of the adoption of different trades by members of the tribe, various branches of the tribe have come into existence. In the 1931 census about 72,311 people were identified with Wani caste. Some Wanis have migrated from the Kashmir Valley to Punjab region, as well as Uttar Pradesh, Madhya Pradesh and Bihar.

== People with the surname ==
- Ashfaq Majeed Wani (1966–1990), separatist militant
- Burhan Wani (1994–2016), Kashmiri militant
- Ghulam Nabi Wani (1916–1981), Indian politician
- Jagannath Wani (1934–2017), Indo-Canadian statistician and philanthropist
- Khawaja Abdul Samad Wani (1935–2001), Kashmiri journalist, Chief Editor, politician, Secretary General and advisor to Prime Minister
- Mansukh Wani (died 2020), Indian-American scientist
- Mohan R. Wani (1965–2024), Indian biologist and immunologist
- Nasir Aslam Wani, Indian politician
- Nazir Ahmad Wani (died 2018), Indian soldier
- Rangnath Wani, Indian politician and Member of the Shiv Sena

== See also ==
- Vaishya Vani
