= 1986 Kashmir riots =

Violence against Hindus in Indian Kashmir in 1986

1986 Kashmir Riots/1986 Anantnag Riots
- Part of the Insurgency in Jammu and Kashmir
- Map showing Indian-administered Kashmir within the larger Kashmir region, with the Kashmir Valley highlighted in green
- Location: 34.0333°N 74.6667°E; Anantnag, Kashmir, J&K, India
- Date: February 1986 – March 1986
- Target: Kashmiri Hindus
- Attack type: Arson, riots, vandalism, looting
- Deaths: Unknown
- Perpetrator: Kashmiri Muslims

The 1986 Kashmir Riots, also commonly referred to as the 1986 Anantnag Riots, were a series of attacks targeting Kashmiri Hindus in the Kashmir Valley of Jammu and Kashmir, India, particularly in Anantnag district.

== Background ==
The JK Land Estates Abolition Act of 1950 allowed the govt to unilaterally confiscate private land owned by landlords, which adversely affected thousands of Kashmiri Hindus overnight. This also led to some Kashmiri Hindus leaving the state.

In 1982, Sheikh Abdullah died, with his son Farooq Abdullah taking over soon after. Despite winning the 1983 election, Farooq was replaced by Ghulam Mohammad Shah, also known as Gul Shah. In Anantnag Mufti Mohammad Sayeed, who later founded the PDP, was the elected representative at the time.

In early 1986, Gul Shah announced the construction of a mosque inside the location of an ancient Hindu Temple in the Jammu Civil Secretariat. This move sparked widespread criticism and protests in Jammu. In February, Gul Shah then went to Kashmir and provocatively said, "Islam khatre mein hain" (Translation: "Islam is in danger"). These incendiary statements by Gul Shah are believed to have been partially to blame for the breaking out of riots. Subsequently, Muslim rioters attacked Hindu-owned businesses and places of worship.

== Rioting ==
After the Indian government allowed the Babri Masjid (the location of the present Ram Mandir, the temple believed to be the birthplace of the deity Rama) to be opened for Hindu worship, protests erupted. 8 cities in Jammu and Kashmir had curfews in place. Hindu temples were burned down and destroyed in towns including Vanpoh, Anantnag, Sopore, Luk Bawan, Salar (Pahalgam Tehsil), Fatehpur, and Akura.

Anantnag, which saw much of the violence, had multiple attacks on Hindu temples. Many Kashmiri Hindu-owned shops, homes and properties were attacked and targeted. These developments led to a large number of Kashmiri Hindus shifting to places including Udhampur and Jammu.

== See also ==
- Persecution of Hindus
- Anti-Hindu sentiment
- Exodus of Kashmiri Hindus
- Panun Kashmir
- Human rights abuses in Jammu and Kashmir
- Insurgency in Jammu and Kashmir
- Timeline of the Kashmir conflict
- Kashmir conflict
- Revocation of the special status of Jammu and Kashmir
