= The Diplomat (2025 film) =

2025 Indian film by Shivam Nair

- Theatrical release poster
- Directed by: Shivam Nair
- Written by: Ritesh Shah
- Produced by: Bhushan Kumar; Krishan Kumar; John Abraham; Sameer Dixit; Jatish Varma; Vipul D. Shah; Ashwin Varde; Rajesh Bahl; Rakesh Dang
- Starring: John Abraham; Sadia Khateeb; Jagjeet Sandhu; Kumud Mishra; Sharib Hashmi; Revathy; Ashwath Bhatt
- Cinematography: Dimo Popov
- Edited by: Kunal Walve
- Music by: Songs: A. R. Rahman; Manan Bhardwaj; Anurag Saikia; Score: Ishaan Chhabra
- Production companies: T-Series Films; JA Entertainment; Wakaoo Films; Fortune Pictures
- Distributed by: Panorama Studios
- Release date: 14 March 2025
- Running time: 137 minutes
- Country: India
- Language: Hindi
- Budget: ₹20 crore
- Box office: est. ₹53.14 crore

The Diplomat is a 2025 Indian Hindi-language political film directed by Shivam Nair and written by Ritesh Shah. The film, starring John Abraham and Sadia Khateeb, is set against the backdrop of India–Pakistan relations, exploring themes of diplomacy and the personal conflicts faced by diplomats.

== Plot ==
The film, based on a true story, follows J. P. Singh, an Indian diplomat stationed at the Indian High Commission in Pakistan, whose life is upended by the arrival of Uzma Ahmed on 5 May 2017. Uzma, a distressed woman seeking refuge, claims to be an Indian citizen abducted to Buner, Khyber Pakhtunkhwa (KPK), and forced into marriage with Tahir, a Pakistani man of Pathan origin. She reveals a harrowing tale of abuse, including physical and sexual assault, at Tahir's hands. Uzma, a mother to a daughter with thalassemia from a previous marriage, had initially believed Tahir's intentions were genuine, meeting him in Malaysia before being taken to a remote village. Her entry into Pakistan without police reporting or an immigration record, orchestrated by Tahir, raises suspicions about her story.

The narrative begins in KPK, where Uzma arrives at the Indian Embassy accompanied by Tahir and his brother Basheer. Seizing a moment when the men step outside to smoke, Uzma pleads with the embassy staff for help, claiming she is in danger. Singh, initially skeptical and suspecting Uzma might be a spy or a terrorist, interrogates her to ascertain the truth. As Uzma recounts her ordeal, Singh grapples with the moral and ethical dilemmas of her case.

Singh's efforts to secure Uzma's safety lead him to engage with Pakistani authorities, including Faraz, the Foreign Secretary of Pakistan, and Malik, the Director General of Inter-Services Intelligence (ISI). The Pakistani officials are convinced Uzma is an Indian spy, alleging she traveled to KPK to establish contact with insurgents and now seeks safe passage back to India. This accusation complicates Singh's mission, as he navigates the Pakistani legal systems, international diplomatic tensions, and pressure from both Indian and Pakistani governments. The film explores the intricate interplay of personal conviction and state affairs (also including Singh explaining to Uzma about how he survived the attack at the Indian Embassy of Kabul in 2008), culminating in Singh's determined efforts to help Uzma cross the Wagah Border to safety on 25 May 2017, highlighting the challenges diplomats face when personal lives intersect with geopolitical conflicts.

== Cast ==
- John Abraham as J. P. Singh, Deputy High Commissioner of India in Pakistan
- Sadia Khateeb as Uzma Ahmed, the woman seeking repatriation to India
- Kumud Mishra as N. M. Syed, a senior diplomat advocate in Pakistan
- Sharib Hashmi as Tiwari, Indian Foreign Service official in Pakistan
- Revathy as Sushma Swaraj, Union Minister of External Affairs of India
- Ashwath Bhatt as Malik, Director General of Inter-Services Intelligence (character based on general Naveed Mukhtar)
- Benjamin Gilani as Foreign Affairs Minister of Pakistan (character based on Sartaj Aziz)
- Jagjeet Sandhu as Tahir Ali, Uzma Ahmed's Pakistani-origin husband and kidnapper
- Vishal Vashishtha as Aayush, Indian Foreign Service official in Pakistan
- Amitoj Mann as Paramjeet Gill
- Bhawani Muzamil as Basheer, Tahir's brother
- Vidhatri Bandi as Seerat
- Suman Rana as Shaheen, Uzma's friend in Malaysia
- Jeet Raidutt as Aamir, Uzma's brother
- Darius Chinoy as Faraz, Foreign Secretary of Pakistan (character based on Tehmina Janjua, the character for this position in movie is male, despite being female character for this position in real life)
- Manoj Chaddha as Public Prosecutor Humayun
- Shriswara as Naina, J. P. Singh's wife

== Production ==
=== Development ===
The film was announced in 2024 with John Abraham as the lead actor. The film was developed under the banner of T Series in collaboration with JA Entertainment. It was inspired by the real-life incident involving Uzma Ahmed, a woman who fled from Pakistan to India in 2017, after being forced into marriage. This true story formed the basis for the film's narrative. Director Shivam Nair was chosen for his previous work in the thriller genre. Ritesh Shah, known for his writing in films like Pink (2016) and Kahaani (2012), was hired to pen the screenplay.

=== Casting ===
John Abraham was cast to play J. P. Singh, a role that would depict the nuanced and often stressful life of a diplomat. Sadia Khateeb, who gained recognition for her performance in Shikara (2020), was cast to portray Uzma Ahmed. The supporting cast includes Kumud Mishra and Sharib Hashmi, to bring depth to the political and personal dynamics within the film.

=== Filming ===
Principal photography began in November 2022. The film was primarily shot in Delhi, with several sequences filmed in actual embassy settings. Some parts of the film also required international locations to depict Islamabad accurately. Shivam Nair focused on ensuring authenticity by working closely with diplomatic consultants to recreate the nuances of a high-pressure diplomatic environment. The film wrapped by late 2024.

== Music ==
The Diplomat

Soundtrack album by A. R. Rahman, Manan Bhardwaj and Anurag Saikia
- Released: 13 March 2025
- Recorded: 2024
- Genre: Bollywood
- Length: 11:02
- Language: Hindi
- Label: T-Series

Official audio
- The Diplomat Full Album on YouTube

The music for The Diplomat was composed by A. R. Rahman, Manan Bhardwaj and Anurag Saikia with lyrics written by Manoj Muntashir, P. K. Mishra and Kausar Munir. The film score is composed by Ishaan Chhabra. The soundtrack features a mix of emotional ballads and intense instrumental tracks that complement the political thriller theme. The music also includes patriotic undertones, reflecting the nationalistic sentiments explored in the story.

The song "Bharat," from the 1992 film Roja, sung by Hariharan and composed by A. R. Rahman is recreated for the film.

"Melma", by Afghanistan-born UK-based singer, Alia Ansari, was used as background score without credit.

Track listing
No.	Title	Lyrics	Music	Singer(s)	Length
1.	"Ghar"	Kausar Munir	Anurag Saikia	Varun Jain, Romy, Anurag Saikia	3:52
2.	"Bharat"	Manoj Muntashir, P. K. Mishra	Manan Bhardwaj, A. R. Rahman	Hariharan, Prajakta Shukre, Himani Kapoor, Natraj Kshericha, Swapnomoy Chowdhury, Kamal Bharti	3:18
3.	"Naina"	Kausar Munir	Anurag Saikia	Varun Jain, Romy, Anurag Saikia	3:52
Total length:					11:02

== Release ==
=== Theatrical ===
After initial postponement from January 2024, it was planned to release in theatres on 7 March 2025, but was eventually postponed by a week to 14 March 2025 (Holi Day). The film was banned across several of the Arab countries in the Persian Gulf region, including Saudi Arabia, Oman, and Qatar.

=== Home media ===
The film's satellite rights were acquired by Sony MAX, where it will be coming soon. The film began streaming on Netflix from 9 May 2025.

== Marketing ==
The marketing campaign for The Diplomat began with the release of the first look poster in January 2025, followed by a teaser and the official trailer, which was dropped on 14 February 2025.

== Reception ==
=== Box office ===
The Diplomat concluded its theatrical run with worldwide gross estimated to be ₹53.14 crore

=== Critical reception ===
On the review aggregator website Rotten Tomatoes, 50% of 16 critics' reviews are positive, with an average rating of 6.2/10.

A critic for Bollywood Hungama rated the film 3.5 out of 5, and wrote "On the whole, The Diplomat is a nail-biting thriller that brings a shocking and heroic true story to life. At the box office, the film may start slow, but with strong word of mouth, it has the potential to grow and make a lasting impact."

Sukanya Verma of Rediff.com gave the film 2.5 out of 5 and observed that "The possibilities of this serviceable thriller are immense but the makers prefer to play it safe and hold back the daredevil in the diplomat's clothing".
