= Agnishekhar =

Kashmiri Pandit writer and political activist, Convenor of Panun Kashmir

- Born: Kuldeep Sumbli; 3 May 1956 (age 70); Srinagar, Jammu and Kashmir
- Occupations: Kashmiri Pandit activist; Writer
- Years active: 1990–present
- Movement: Panun Kashmir
- Spouse: Kshama Kaul
- Children: 2, including Bhasha
- Writing career
- Occupations: Author and Poet
- Pen name: Agnishekhar
- Language: Kashmiri; Hindi
- Subject: Exodus of Kashmiri Hindus
- Notable works: Kisi Bhi Samay (1992); Mujhse Chheen Li Gayi Meri Nadi (1996); Kaal Vriksh Ki Chhaya Mein (2002); Jawahar Tunnel (2010)

Kuldeep Sumbli (born 3 May 1956), better known by his pen name Agnishekhar, is a Kashmiri Pandit writer and political activist. He is the founder of Panun Kashmir ("Our Kashmir") organization, a group that advocates for the cultural rights of Pandits and a homeland. As a poet, he has contributed to the development of a Hindi poetry of exile from a distinctly Kashmiri perspective. He views pre-Islamic culture as a source for contemporary Pandit identity.

== Works ==
Agnishekhar is the author of Kisi Bhi Samay (At Any Moment), a collection of poetry published in 1992. The book is organized into two sections: the 49 poems of "Kram" ("Sequence"), and the ten poems of "Visthapit Kashmir" ("Displaced Kashmir") which differ from "Kram" in being labeled by place of composition (always Jammu) and a date ranging from mid-1990 to early 1991. The poem "Mahavipada" ("Great Trouble"), from the "Displaced Kashmir" section, criticizes the camps into which displaced Pandits were settled.

Agnishekhar also contributed to the screenplay for the "Bollywood-style" movie Sheen, which uses Pandit displacement as the context of a love story.

Athrot is an organization of displaced artists and writers organized its first ever Kashmiri Poetry day on 27 August 2018 and Agnishekar presided over the poetic session.

Mohammed Ayub Betab's poems in original Kashmiri are translated to Hindi by Agni Shekhar.
