= Tika Lal Taploo =

Indian politician (1930–1989)

- Born: October 6, 1930; Srinagar, J&K, British India (now in J&K, India)
- Died: 13 September 1989 (aged 58); Srinagar, J&K, India
- Education: Panjab University (BA); Aligarh Muslim University (MA, LLB)
- Known for: Political activism
- Political party: Bharatiya Janata Party
- Spouse: Sarla Taploo

Tika Lal Taploo (6 October 1930 – 13 September 1989) was an Indian advocate and politician from Jammu and Kashmir, who was shot dead by Islamist militants.

== Early life and education ==
Taploo was born on 6 October 1930 in Srinagar into a Kashmiri Pandit family. He graduated from Panjab University and done his Masters in Arts and LLB from Aligarh Muslim University.

In later life, he practised as an advocate in Jammu and Kashmir High Court and engaged in political activity. He was the vice-president of Bharatiya Janata Party in Jammu and Kashmir and also an active member of the Rashtriya Swayamsevak Sangh. He stood for several elections to the Jammu and Kashmir Legislative Assembly, however he was never elected, reportedly due to the gerrymandering of his electoral constituency. He had a large following as a social and political activist.

== Death ==
On 13 September 1989, Taploo was assassinated by the JKLF militants at his home in Srinagar. His funeral was held on 14 September 1989, attended by many senior leaders including BJP leader Lal Krishna Advani and Kidar Nath Sahani.

In September 2022, the Supreme Court of India declined to consider a petition requesting an investigation into the murder of Tika Lal Taploo in the Kashmir valley in 1989. The bench of Justices Bhushan Ramkrishna Gavai and C. T. Ravikumar declined to hear the matter, stating that they had not entertained a similar case recently. The petition was submitted by Ashutosh Taploo, the son of Tika Lal Taploo.

== In popular culture ==
Tika Lal Taploo's story is featured in the 2022 Hindi film The Kashmir Files directed by Vivek Agnihotri, which revisits the killings of Kashmiri Pandits in 1989.

In March 2022, a North Delhi municipal school was renamed after Taploo. Amid raging debate across the country after the movie The Kashmir Files screening, BJP-led Delhi Municipal Corporation renamed a school as 'Shaheed Tika Lal Taploo' in the Rohini area in sector 7-B.

== See also ==
- 1986 Anantnag Riots
- Exodus of Kashmiri Hindus
