= Riddhima Kapoor Sahni =

Indian fashion designer and actress

- Born: Mumbai, India
- Occupation: Actor
- Spouse: Bharat Sahni (m. 2006)
- Children: 1
- Parents: Rishi Kapoor (father); Neetu Singh (mother)
- Family: Kapoor family

Riddhima Kapoor Sahni is an Indian jewelry designer, entrepreneur, and actress. She is the daughter of actors Neetu Singh and Rishi Kapoor and the elder sister of actor Ranbir Kapoor. She founded the jewelry brand Riddhima Kapoor Sahni Jewellery in 2016 and made her acting debut in the 2026 Hindi film Daadi Ki Shaadi.

== Biography ==
Despite being born into a film family on both sides, Kapoor Sahni initially pursued a career in fashion and jewelry design rather than acting. She has been married to Bharat Sahni since January 25, 2006. The couple has one daughter, Samara Sahni, who was born in 2011.

Riddhima Kapoor Sahni officially joined the cast of Fabulous Lives vs Bollywood Wives (formerly Fabulous Lives of Bollywood Wives) for its third season. Her addition to the reality television series was announced in February 2024. She appeared in episodes of The Kapil Sharma Show and The Great Indian Kapil Show alongside family members.

Kapoor Sahni made her acting debut in the 2026 Hindi film Daadi Ki Shaadi, directed by Ashish R. Mohan. She appeared alongside her mother, Neetu Singh, as well as Kapil Sharma, Sadia Khateeb, and R. Sarathkumar. The film received attention for marking Kapoor Sahni's acting debut. Actor Aamir Khan praised her debut performance.

== Filmography ==
=== Television ===
Year	Title	Role
2021	The Kapil Sharma Show	Self
2024	The Great Indian Kapil Show	Self
2024	Fabulous Lives vs Bollywood Wives	Self

=== Film ===
Year	Title	Role	Language
2026	Daadi Ki Shaadi	Sunaina Bharadwaj	Hindi

=== Awards ===
- Top 5 entrepreneurs in Delhi in 2017
- March 6, 2017 - Femina Powerlist Award (North) in 2017
- Apr 8, 2018 - FICCI FLO Delhi Award for RKS Jewellery in 2018
- March 22, 2206 - OTT Awards (2025) — Won Best Ensemble Cast for Fabulous Lives vs Bollywood Wives (shared with the cast)
