= Akura =

Akura may refer to several places:

- Akura, India
- Akura, Georgia
