= Abhay Sopori =

Abhay Rustum Sopori
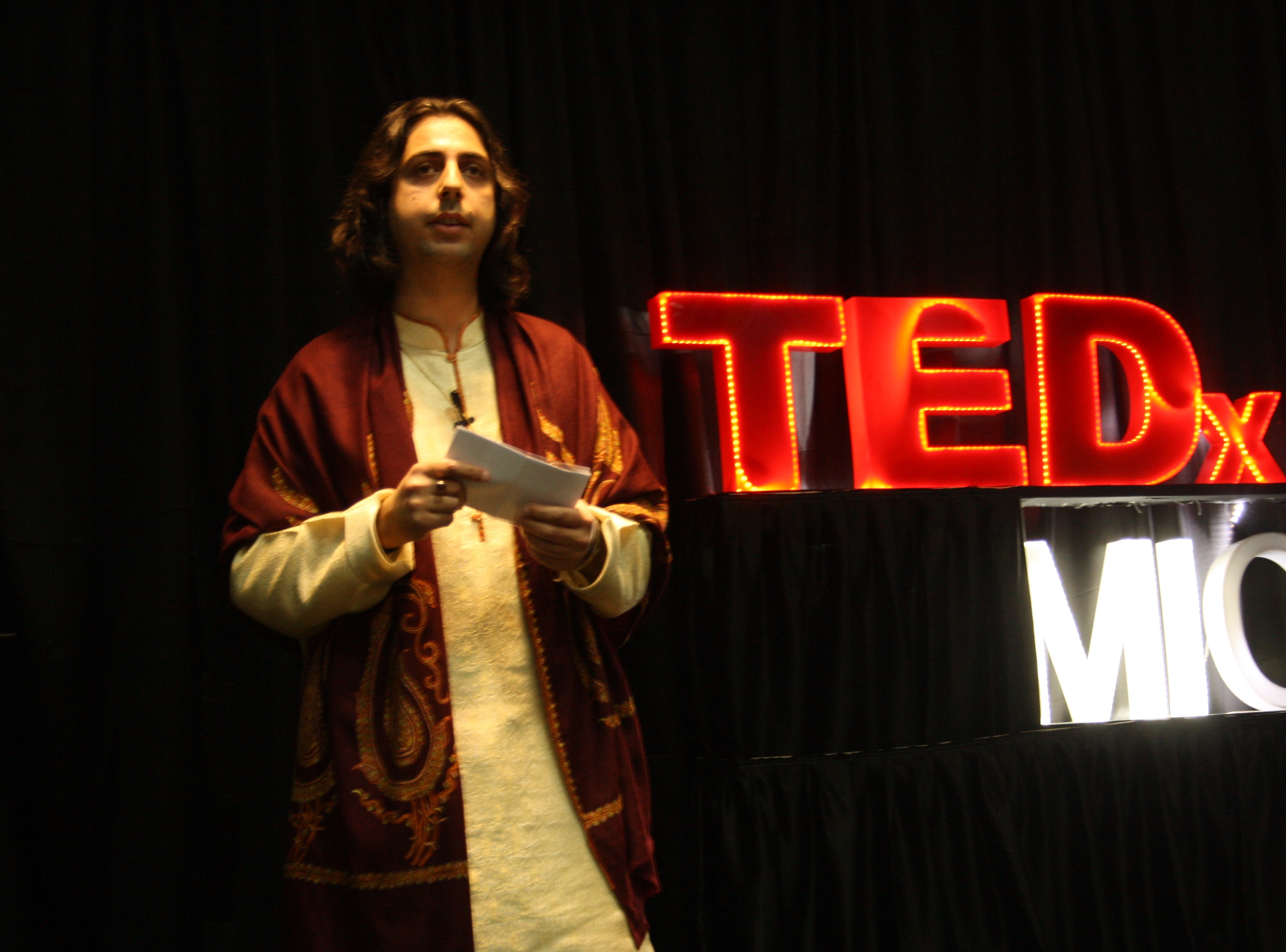
- Born: Abhay Rustum Sopori; 7 June 1979 (age 47); Srinagar, Jammu and Kashmir, India
- Occupations: Musician, Composer
- Relatives: Bhajan Sopori (father)
- Musical career
- Origin: Kashmiri
- Genres: Fusion music, Hindustani classical music
- Instrument: Santoor
- Website: abhaysopori.com

Abhay Rustum Sopori (born 7 June 1979) is an Indian Santoor player, music composer and conductor. He is the son of Santoor player Pandit Bhajan Sopori, known for his versatility, innovations and experimentation. Sopori has received awards in recognition of his contribution in the field of music, and is one of the youngest recipients of awards such as 'Bharat Shiromani Award' & 'Ustad Bismillah Khan Yuva Puraskar'. Abhay was invited to speak at the international conference TEDx.

== Life and career ==
=== Early life and family ===
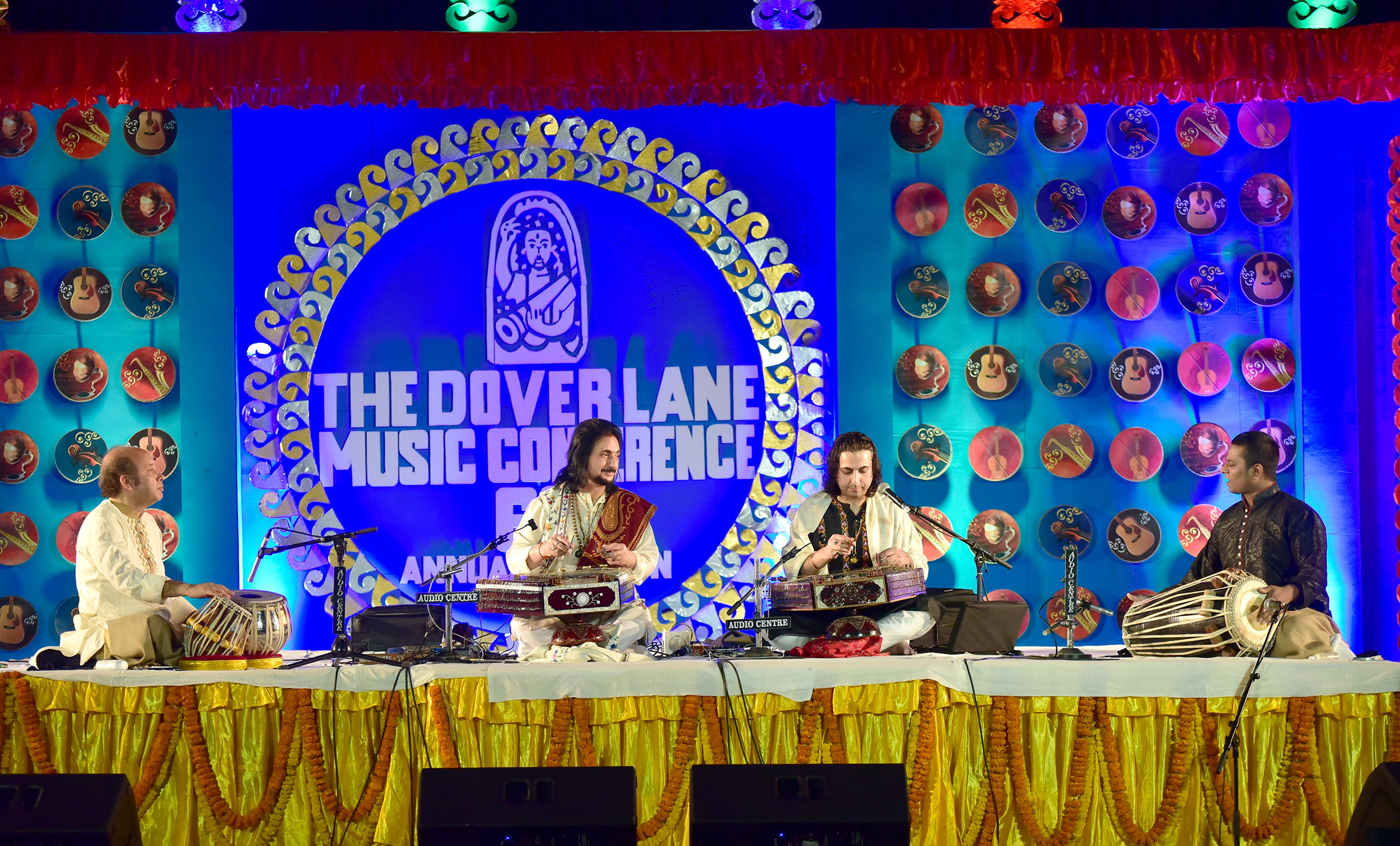
2020: Abhay performing with Pt. Bhajan Sopori ji

Abhay Rustum Sopori was born on 7 June 1979 in the city of Srinagar situated in the Kashmir Valley of Jammu and Kashmir, India into a Kashmiri Pandit family. His parents were musician Bhajan Sopori and Aparna Sopori, a professor of English literature. He learned Santoor under the traditional Guru-Shishya Parampara of his mystic Shaivite-Sufi tradition from his grandfather Shamboo Nath Sopori, hailed as the "Father of Classical Music" in Jammu and Kashmir and his father Bhajan Sopori.

Abhay represents the Sufiana Gharana of Kashmir, coming from a family of traditional Santoor players, spanning over nine generations spread over more than 300 years.

Sopori has a bachelor's and master's degree in Music from Pracheen Kala Kendra, Chandigarh, India and holds bachelors in Commerce from Delhi University and Computers from Indira Gandhi National Open University.

=== Career ===
Sopori was trained in Indian classical music from his childhood, as well as Western and Sufiana music. Apart from santoor, he also learned vocals, Indian classical sitar, Sufiana sitar and piano. He recorded his first song at the age of 3 for a musical feature for All India Radio composed by his father and was also part of his father's grand choral presentation featuring over 8000 voices in Srinagar Kashmir in 1985.

He presented his first Choral presentation featuring over 100 singers in October 2005 in Kashmir organised by Sopori Academy of Music And Performing Arts (SaMaPa). Abhay's J&K Folk Music Ensembles (Soz-o-Saaz) have also been presented at various other festivals and conferences, which include the 'Jammu & Kashmir Festival' presented at the Indira Gandhi National Center for the Arts in New Delhi in 2009 and Ganesh Kala KridaRangmanch in Pune in 2010, which left the audiences captivated and mesmerized. Abhay's Classical fusions have also received rave reviews.

In 2000, Abhay started his musical work in Kashmir performing for the youth across the Valley promoting Indian classical music and culture and is credited with changing the entire cultural scenario of Jammu & Kashmir bringing the youth together through music. His concerts in border areas of J&K have been attended by over 20,000 people.

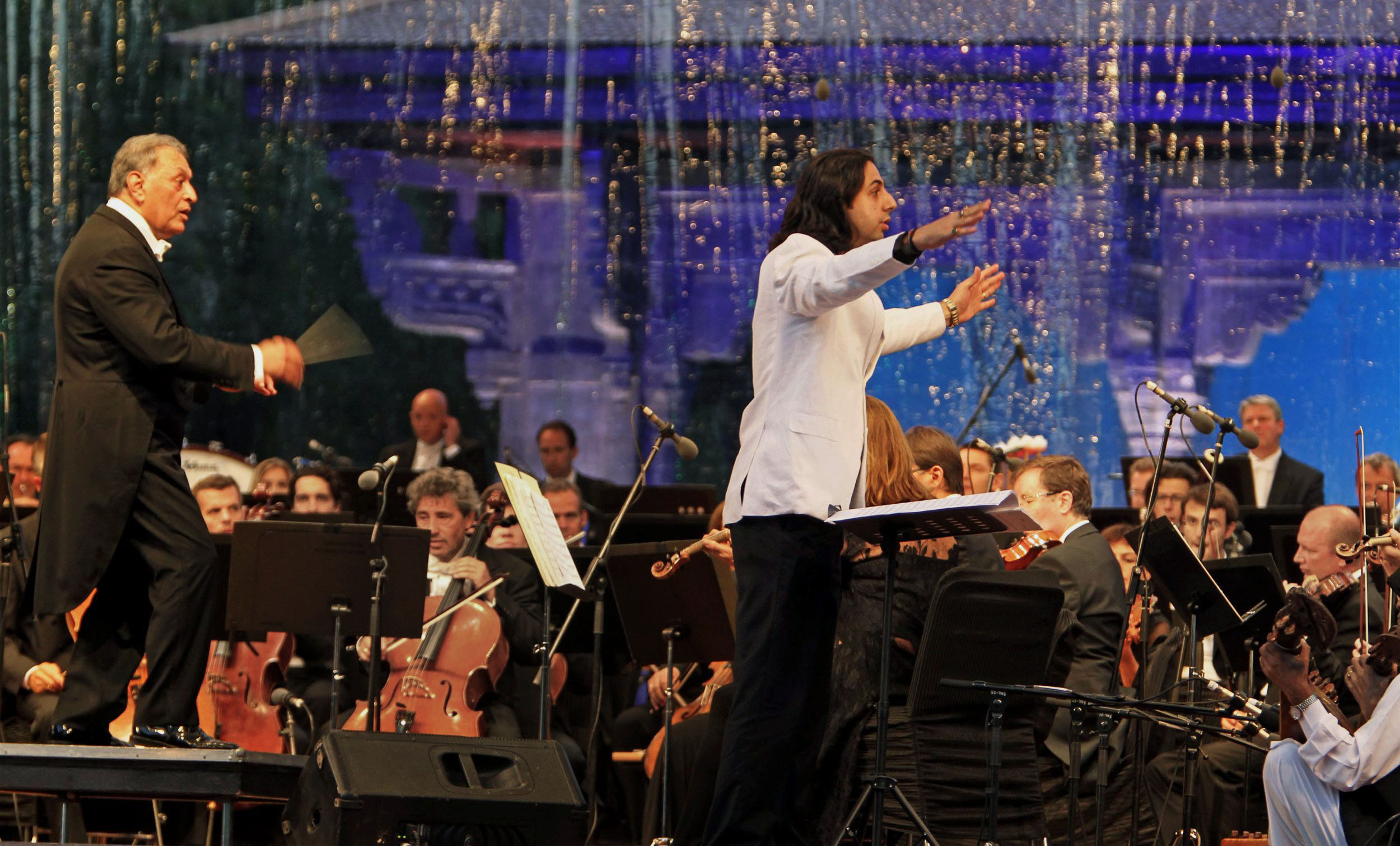
Abhay Rustum Sopori conducting along with Zubin Mehta in Kashmir 2013

Since his debut as a Classical Santoor player in mid 1990s, Abhay has performed in prestigious festivals across India and around the world in countries like the United States, Russia, Brazil, Mauritius, Japan, South Korea, Singapore, Germany, France, Italy, Slovakia, Czech Republic, Hungary, Sweden, Switzerland, Spain, Slovenia, Ukraine, Thailand, Malaysia, Vietnam, Morocco, Iran, Israel, Bahrain, Dubai, etc.

Sopori introduced the concept of 'Sufi Music Ensemble' titled 'Sufi Kinship®’ in 2011 featuring 35 musicians and Santoor led an Indian Classical Music Ensemble in 2014 featuring 25 musicians and performed at various concerts across India.

He scored the music for the fusion composition titled Haftrang (seven colors in Kashmiri) in 2013 performed by the Bavarian State Orchestra of Germany, together with his Kashmiri folk music ensemble Soz-o-Saaz, giving international recognition to Kashmiri music. The concert was telecast live in more than 100 countries. The orchestra consisted of around 100 musicians.

Sopori has also done international collaborations including presentations with the Austrian Vienna Boys Choir, Moroccan Lutist Haj Younis, Iranian santoor player Darius Saghafi, American dulcimer player Malcom Dalgish, French clarinetist Laurent Clouet & others.

He has held various cultural positions like:

- General Secretary, SaMaPa (Sopori Academy of Music And Performing Arts) (SaMaPa), one of the most prominent and prestigious music academies and organizations of India (2005 onwards)
- Member of Central Committee, J&K Academy of Art, Culture & Languages, Govt. of J&K (2016 onwards)
- Member of General Council, J&K Academy of Art, Culture & Languages, Govt. of J&K (2016 onwards)
- Member, Editorial Board, JK Music Initiative, Music Journal by Department of Higher Education, Govt. of J&K (2018 onwards)
- Visiting Faculty, University of Massachusetts, Amherst USA (2004)

== Artistry ==
=== Style of Santoor ===
Sopori's Classical Santoor performance is marked by smooth playing, fast tempo, accuracy of Indian Classical Raga exposition and the adoption of the Sopori Baaj (style), the unique and systematic format of Santoor playing created by his father.

Presentation of Dhrupad system along with the accompaniment of the Pakhawaj is also a special characteristic of his Sopori Baaj and performance. He sings the compositions along with their instrumental rendering reviving his traditional Shaivaite - Sufi Santoor Parampara.

=== Innovations and creations ===
Sopori continues to innovate and experiment with Santoor to further extend its dimensions. He has introduced the Open String Concept, together with the Enhanced Sustain Technique, giving a new dimension to the sound. He also established the concept of ‘'Gayan-Vadan Baaj'’ (vocal-instrumental system) and ‘'Been Ang' for the Santoor'. He invented, designed and introduced a 30-stringed instrument in 2004 named as Sur-Santoor.

Sopori has been instrumental in reviving the old Sufiana compositions of his predecessors and adopted them in the Indian Classical scenario and also composed and introduced new Khayal compositions. Raga Nirmalkauns named after Shri Mataji Nirmala Devi and Raga MahaKali named after Goddess Mother Kali are Abhay's newly composed Ragas.

=== Composer ===
Abhay has composed music for Films, Telefilms, Short Films, Serials (TV & Radio) and Documentaries. He recently debuted as a composer in Bollywood commercial cinema with Shikara movie and composed the Love theme song Dilbar Lagyo and the Wedding Song titled Shukrana Gul Khile.

His other work includes Mahatma, a documentary film by Government of India on Mahatma Gandhi, presented at the United Nations marking the first International Non-violence Day, the Kashmiri film Bub, and the film Ziyarat.

== Filmography ==
Year	Song	Project	Role
2022	Mannum Niranje	Malayankunju	Santoor player
2020	Dilbar Lagyo	Shikara, Bollywood	Composer
2020	Shukrana Gul Khile	Shikara, Bollywood	Composer
2018	Soundtrack	To my Brother, Short film	Composer
2011	Sana Kim Lole	Ziyarat, film	Co-composer
2011	Manzil Manzil	Ziyarat, film	Co-composer, Singer
2011	Sapne Ke Meet	Ziyarat, film	Co-composer
2011	Soundtrack	Kab Tak, Short film on child labor	Composer
2007	Soundtrack	Mahatma, Documentary film	Composer
2001	Khaus Rauz Sunderi	Bub, Kashmiri feature film	Singer, Assistant Music Director

== Television ==
- Sailaab (Flood) - Composer, Singer, Doordarshan
- Guldasta (Flower Bouquet) - Composer, Doordarshan
- Tabla ka Itihas (History of Table instrument) - Composer, Radio
- Roshni (Light) - Composer, Doordarshan
- Do Sheheron Ki Kahani (Tale of Two Cities) - Composer, Doordarshan
- Bazm-E-Chiraghan - Singer, Composer, Doordarshan (Urdu)
- Aaj Tak news channel title music, Santoor music

== Compositions ==
=== Albums ===
- Vishuddha 1, SaMaPa, Classical Santoor
- Vishuddha 2, SaMaPa, Classical Santoor
- Triveni, SaMaPa, Santoor Fusion
- Sopori Legacy, SaMaPa, Classical Santoor
- Dancing Dewdrops, Virgin EMI Records, Santoor Fusion (Classical)
- The Urban Grooves – Kashmir, Virgin EMI Records, Santoor Fusion (Kashmiri)
- Tum Jo Mile, Virgin EMI Records, Santoor Fusion
- Voyage au coeur de l'Inde, Virgin EMI Records, Santoor Fusion
- Spirit of Doon, Virgin EMI Records, Composer
- Fragrances of Cabella, SaMaPa, Classical Santoor
- Voice of Strings, Mars Music, Classical Santoor
- New Strings, Mars Music, Classical Santoor
- Santoor Vadan, NITL India, Classical Santoor
- Shehjaar, Saregama& SaMaPa, Composer
- Aalav, Saregama & SaMaPa, Co-composer
- Runjhun, Saregama & SaMaPa, Co-composer
- Kabir Bani, SaMaPa, Composer & Singer
- Meera Bhajans, SaMaPa, Composer & Singer
- Ma Haro Meri Peer, SaMaPa, Co-composer
- Ajab Nain Tere, SaMaPa, Co-composer
- Anwari Muhammadi^{SAW}, SaMaPa, Composer
- Jai Baba Barfani (Shri Amarnath Ji Shrine Board), Co-composer & Singer
- Amarnath Yatra, Times Music, Co-composer & Singer

=== Singles ===
- Vaishno Janto Folk Instrumental version, Doordarshan, Govt. of India, Co-composer
- Ek Bharat Shresth Bharat, All India Radio, Co-composer & Singer
- Challa, T-Series (company), Composer
- Aao Kadam Badhayain (SaMaPa), Composer
- Dua (SaMaPa), Composer & Singer
- Wohi Khuda Hai (SaMaPa), Composer
- Nai Subha - Kashmiri (SaMaPa), Composer & Singer
- Nai Subha - Dogri (SaMaPa), Composer & Singer
- Hazrat-e-Nabi^{SAW} (SaMaPa), Composer
- Jannat-e-Kashmir (SaMaPa), Co-composer & Singer

== Awards and accolades ==
- 2020: Mahatma Gandhi Seva Medal - Gandhi Global Peace Award by United Nations accredited Gandhi Global Family - Jammu and Kashmir (union territory)
- 2019: Top Grade Artist by All India Radio, Govt. of India - Delhi
- 2018: Raag Ranjani Sangeet Bhushan Award - Delhi
- 2018: Pt. Man Mohan Bhatt Award - Rajasthan
- 2017: Atal Shikhar Samman - Presented at the Parliament of India - Delhi
- 2017: Dr. S. Radhakrishnan National Media Award - Delhi
- 2016: State Icon - title by Election Commission of India - Jammu and Kashmir (union territory)
- 2016: Pride of Paradise Award - Jammu and Kashmir (union territory)
- 2015: Pride of India Award - Delhi
- 2015: Sangeet Gaurav Samman - Delhi
- 2014: Madras Music Academy Award - Chennai
- 2014: Sangeet Mani Award - Delhi
- 2013: Indian Fine Arts Society Award - Kingdom of Bahrain
- 2013: Sabzaar Award of Excellence - Jammu and Kashmir (union territory)
- 2012: Kashmir Kirti Samman - Pune.
- 2011: J&K Civil Award - Highest Civilian Award of Jammu & Kashmir by J&K Govt. - Srinagar
- 2011: Kashmir Educational, Cultural & Social Society (KECSS) Award - Delhi
- 2010: Glory of India Award - United Kingdom
- 2010: Best Citizens of India Award - Delhi
- 2010: Raag Ranjani Sangeet Shree Award - Delhi
- 2010: Bharat Shiromani Award - Delhi
- 2009: Ma Sharika Samman - Haryana
- 2008: National Dogri Award - Jammu and Kashmir (union territory)
- 2007: Pt. Gama Maharaj Sangeet Bhushan Samman - Delhi
- 2007: Excellence Award - Delhi
- 2006: Sangeet Natak Akademi’s first 'Ustad Bismillah Khan Yuva Puraskar - Delhi
- 2006: Young India Award - Jammu and Kashmir (union territory)
- 2005: Juenjo Korean International Heritage Award - Seoul, South Korea
- 2004: Kalawant Samman - Mumbai

== Philanthropic contributions ==
Sopori started working with the State Government of Jammu and Kashmir to expand and accomplish his grandfather's dream and after several years of hard work and dedication, he was able to introduce music as a formal subject in the educational setup of Jammu and Kashmir. The initiative also called The Music Initiative of Abhay Rustum Sopori has been a major step in the educational system of the state (now union territory) creating new streams in colleges and universities and, offering new job opportunities for the youth.

Sopori is a strong believer of peace and humanity and has been promoting the same ideology also preached by Mahatma Gandhi through music. He has introduced the concept of 'Common Song' aimed at providing a musical healing touch in Jammu and Kashmir under the banner of SaMaPa, which include musical hits like 'Aao Kadam Badhayain', 'Mere Jannet-e-Kashmir', 'Zameen', 'Nai Subha', 'Jammu-Ane', 'Wohi Khuda Hai', 'Dua', etc.

In 2005 Abhay, along with his father, founded the music academy and organization called SaMaPa (Sopori Academy of Music And Performing Arts), which is acclaimed for its work in Delhi and J&K. Post 2005, the programmes and events have been organized under the banner of SaMaPa. Some of the festivals include SaMaPa Sangeet Sammelan (Delhi) which is considered as the topmost music festival of Delhi; SaMaPa Aalap Festival (J&K) which is one of the biggest music festivals witnessed by over 50,000 people. SaMaPa Aalap Festival is held at a number of venues including border areas, cultural centers, jails, etc. at places like Sopore, Baramulla, Kupwara, Bandipora, Budgam, Anantnag, Ganderbal, Srinagar, Jammu, Samba, Khour, RS Pora, Rajouri, Poonch, Katra, Udampur, Akhnoor, etc. The festival was started in 2006 and over the years has presented thousands of young talents of Jammu and Kashmir.

Sopori has held charity concerts for various medical and social causes and also catastrophes like Kashmir earthquake in 2005 (over INR 10 million) & Jammu and Kashmir floods in 2014 (over INR 8 million).

== Gallery ==
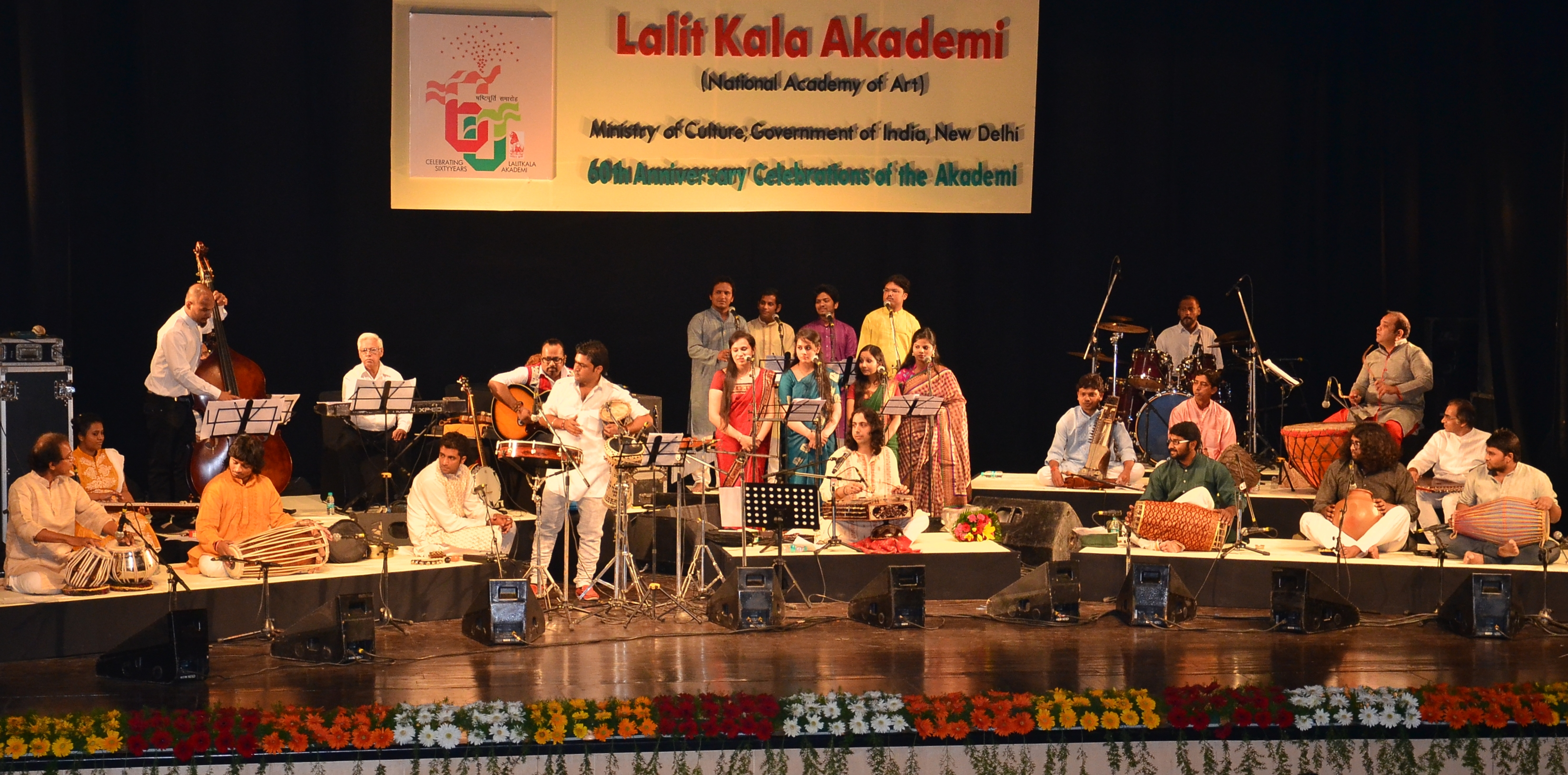
Abhay Rustum Sopori presenting his Classical Music Ensemble 2014 in Delhi

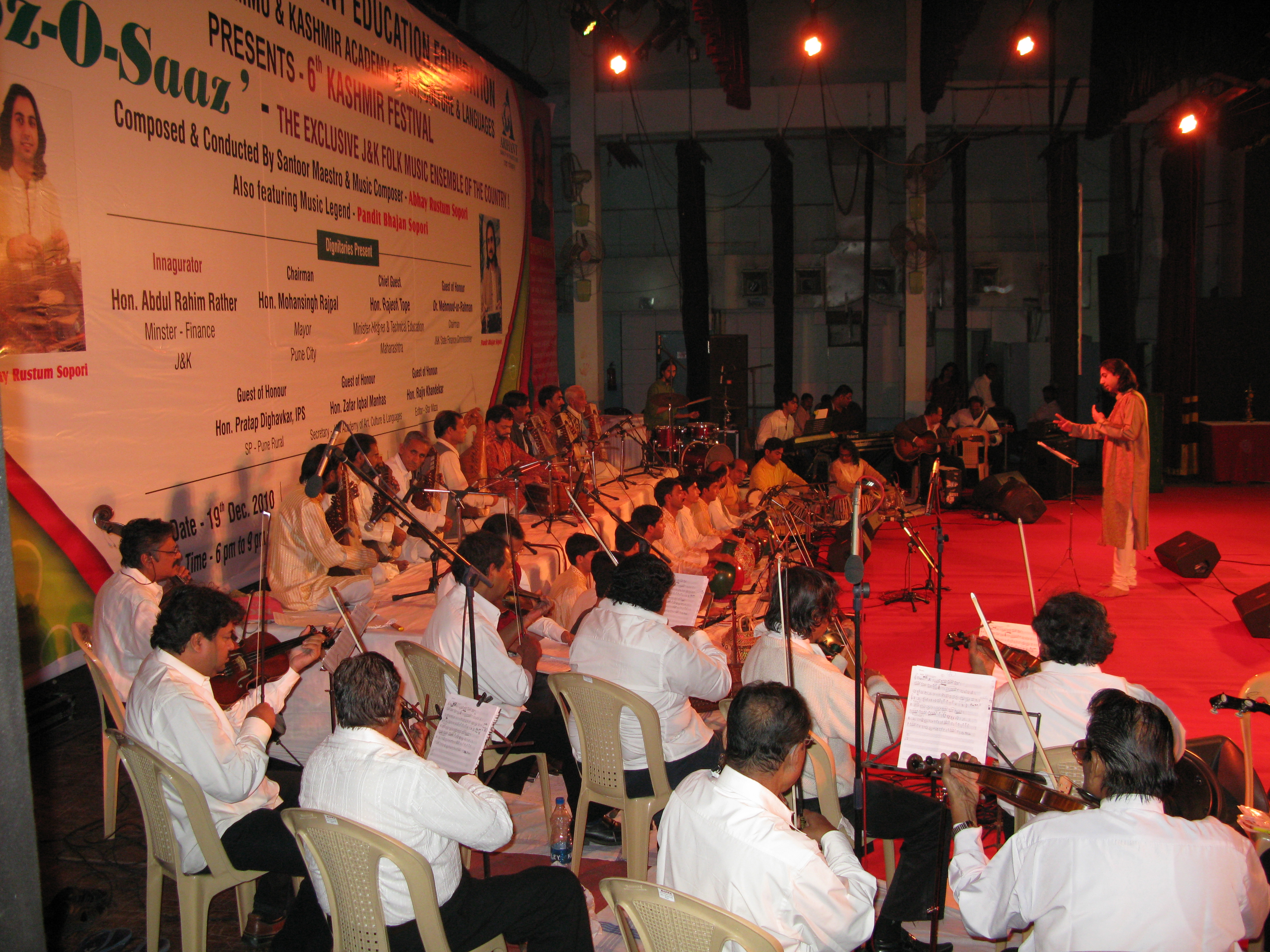
Abhay Rustum Sopori presenting his J&K Folk Music Ensemble in Pune

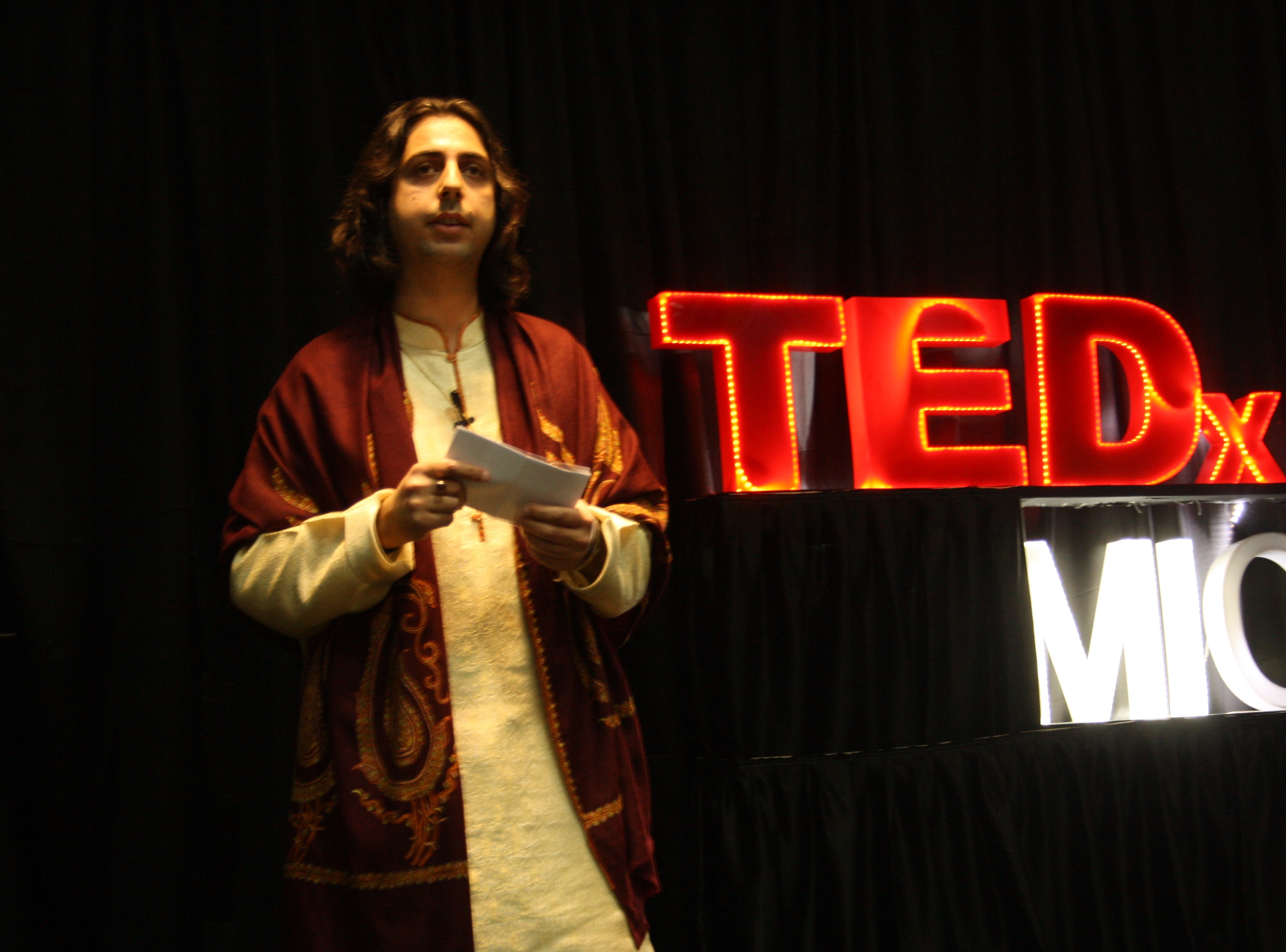
Abhay Rustum Sopori speaking at TEDx 2012
