= Sadia Khateeb =

Indian actress (born 1997)

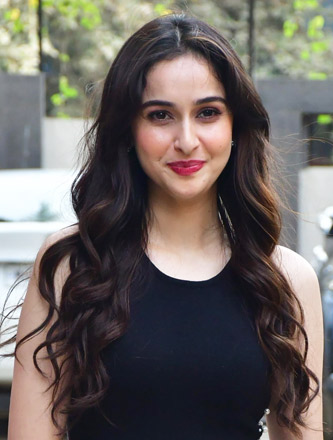
- Khateeb in 2025
- Born: 18 September 1997 (age 29); Bhaderwah, Jammu and Kashmir, India
- Occupation: Actress
- Years active: 2020–present
- Height: 1.74 m (5 ft 9 in)

Sadia Khateeb (born 18 September 1997) is an Indian actress who works in Hindi films. She made her acting debut with Vidhu Vinod Chopra's film Shikara (2020) for which she received Filmfare Award for Best Female Debut nomination. Khateeb has since starred in Raksha Bandhan (2022) and The Diplomat (2025).

== Early life ==
Khateeb was born in a in Bhaderwah town of Doda district of Jammu and Kashmir, India. Khateeb graduated from GCET Jammu, after which she moved to Mumbai to pursue her acting career.

== Career ==
Khateeb made her acting debut in Hindi films with the 2020 film Shikara, a drama by filmmaker Vidhu Vinod Chopra. The film narrates a love story at the peak of insurgency in Jammu and Kashmir and the subsequent Exodus of Kashmiri Hindus. She portrayed the role of Shanti Dhar, a Kashmiri Brahmin woman forced to flee her land with her husband during the 1990 insurgency in Kashmir. Pallabi Dey of The Times of India wrote "Sadia, with her infectious smile, is a natural in portions where she is playing the younger part".

Khateeb next appeared in Raksha Bandhan portraying. The film received mixed reviews. A critic for Bollywood Hungama rated the film 3.5 out of 5 stars and wrote "The Akshay Kumar starrer Raksha Bandhan is a touching family saga, with a highly emotional second half that uplifts the film". She received praises for her role, with critics stating "Sadia Khateeb leaves the maximum impact and looks quite stunning".

In 2025, Khateeb next appeared alongside John Abraham in The Diplomat.

== Filmography ==
=== Films ===
Key
| † | Denotes films that have not yet been released |

| Year | Title | Role | Notes | Ref. |
|---|---|---|---|---|
| 2020 | Shikara | Shanti Sapru Dhar | | |
| 2022 | Raksha Bandhan | Gayatri Agarwal Mishra | | |
| 2025 | The Diplomat | Uzma Ahmed | | |
| 2026 | Daadi Ki Shaadi | Kanika Ahuja | | |
| 2026 | Silaa † | Silaa | Filming | |

== Awards and nominations ==
| Year | Award | Category | Film | Result | Ref. |
|---|---|---|---|---|---|
| 2020 | Filmfare Awards | Best Female Debut | Shikara | Nominated | |
