= Rahul Pandita =

Indian author and journalist

- Born: 5 February 1976 (age 50); Srinagar, J&K, India
- Occupations: Journalist, author
- Awards: International Red Cross award (2010)

Rahul Pandita (Hindi pronunciation: [raːɦʊl pŋɖɪt̪aː]) is an Indian author and journalist.

== Early life ==
Pandita was born on 5 February 1976 in Srinagar, in the Kashmir Valley of the erstwhile Indian state of Jammu and Kashmir, into a Kashmiri Pandit family. In 1990, at the age of 14, he was forced to leave Kashmir along with his family during the forced Exodus of Kashmiri Pandits.

== Career ==
Pandita is the author of three best-selling and critically-acclaimed books: "Our Moon has Blood Clots: A memoir of a lost home in Kashmir" (Penguin Random House, 2013); "Hello, Bastar: The untold story of India's Maoist movement" (Westland, 2011), and "The Lover Boy of Bahawalpur: How the Pulwama case was cracked (Juggernaut, 2021). He is one of the founding members of the much-acclaimed Open magazine and has also previously worked with the Indian Express and the TV Today group. He was also the Opinion and Special Stories Editor of The Hindu, one of India's leading newspapers, which he quit citing frequent and childish interventions in edit pages by Malini Parthasarathy, the owner-editor of the paper. He is a conflict-writer, who has reported extensively from war zones, including Iraq and Sri Lanka. His vast experience in reporting on India's Maoist insurgency has resulted in two books: Hello, Bastar: The Untold Story of India's Maoist Movement and The Absent State.

Pandita is the author of the best-selling memoir on Kashmir, Our Moon Has Blood Clots, covering the ethnic cleansing of Kashmiri Hindus, which was described as the "most powerful non-fiction book of the year". The book inspired many parts of the 2020 Hindi film Shikara.

Pandita has worked as a war correspondent, and is known for his journalistic dispatches from the war hit countries like Iraq and Sri Lanka. He has also reported from North-Eastern India. In 2009, he was given a rare opportunity to interview the Maoist supreme commander, Ganapathi.

Pandita was also awarded the New India Fellowship. In 2015, he was also named a Yale World Fellow.

Pandita is currently writing a screenplay for a web series for Sony Liv, based on his book on Pulwama, to be directed by the filmmaker Onir. It is supposed to be out by 2023.

== Works ==
- The Absent State (2010)
- Hello, Bastar (2011)
- Our Moon Has Blood Clots (2013)
- The Lover Boy of Bahawalpur (2021)

=== Hello, Bastar ===
The book covers the Naxalite–Maoist insurgency in the Bastar district beginning the 1980s. The book includes several interviews and real life accounts and was published by Westland.

== Awards ==
Pandita was awarded the International Red Cross award for his reportage from the Maoist-affected areas in central and east India, in 2010. In 2015, he was named a Yale World Fellow.
