= Daadi Ki Shaadi =

2026 Indian film by Ashish R. Mohan

- Theatrical release poster
- Directed by: Ashish R Mohan
- Written by: Ashish R. Mohan; Bunty Rathore; Saahil S Sharma
- Produced by: Shraddha Agrawal; Gurjot singh; Akshit Lahoria; Komal Shahani
- Starring: Neetu Kapoor; Kapil Sharma; Riddhima Kapoor Sahni; Sadia Khateeb; R. Sarathkumar
- Cinematography: Suresh Beesaveni; Mark Nutkins
- Edited by: Protim Khaound
- Music by: Heer; Amaan Noor; Payal Dev; Aditya Dev; Gulraj Singh; Joi Barua
- Production companies: RTake Studios; BeingU Studios; Shimla Talkies
- Distributed by: Panorama Studios
- Release date: 8 May 2026
- Running time: 150 minutes
- Country: India
- Language: Hindi
- Budget: ₹20 crore
- Box office: ₹8.74 crore

Daadi Ki Shaadi (transl. Grandmother's Wedding) is a 2026 Indian Hindi-language family comedy drama film written and directed by Ashish R Mohan. Produced under R Take Studios, BeingU Studios and Shimla Talkies, the film stars Neetu Kapoor, Kapil Sharma, Riddhima Kapoor Sahni, Sadia Khateeb and R. Sarathkumar. It was released theatrically on 8 May 2026.

== Plot ==
72-year-old Vimla Ahuja lives a quiet, lonely life in Shimla, hoping her family would visit more often. Two days after posting on Facebook about a friend's wedding, she finds her children and grandchildren visiting her late at night, along with a guy named Tony Kalra. After overhearing her family, she learns that they believe Vimla will remarry due to an autocorrect error from the Facebook post.

Tony Kalra, grandson of Ponty Kalra, owner of Kalra Sweets, has been trying to marry for several years, but with no luck. The matchmaker offers one name to the Kalra family: Kanika "Kannu" Ahuja, whom Tony has had a crush on since college, but Kannu wants to wait at least two years between engagement and marriage. Despite this, the Kalra and Ahuja families agree to the engagement. However, before Tony and Kannu can be officially engaged, Vimla's Facebook post about marrying is publicly revealed, leading to the engagement being called off.

Kannu's father and Vimla's elder son, Jeevan Ahuja, tries to contact Vimla, but to no avail. He tries to contact his sister, Sunaina, and his brother, Naag. Jeevan is able to contact the latter, and the two decide to take their families to Shimla to confirm the situation. Tony still hopes to become engaged to Kannu and invites himself to join the Ahujas on their journey to Shimla, as his grandfather will not allow his engagement with Kannu if Vimla remarries.

While Vimla realizes why her family has come, she decides that rather than correct them, she will claim that she will remarry, if only to spend a few days of quality time with her family. Vimla works with her friends to sell the lie, while Tony works with the Ahujas to stop the wedding. Vimla claims she will marry Captain Adivishnu Reddy, a man who flirts with Vimla and his friends despite being married, but the day he's supposed to play the husband to-be, Reddy has a bicycle accident. Vimla asks Reddy's visiting friend, Col. Theeran Devarajan, to play the role. Devarajan is reluctant at first, but after being mistaken and berated by Tony and the Ahuja brothers as Captain Reddy, he changes his mind. Tony later reveals to the family that Reddy remains married to his second wife, but a police officer (who is Devarajan's friend) claims that the woman Tony said was Reddy's second wife was lying. The Ahuja family let Tony be taken by the police, and Kannu tells Tony that she never intended to marry him -- she planned to move to New Zealand alone during the two-year period.

After Tony is taken by the police, Vimla's daughter, Sunaina, arrives at the Ahuja household along with her own daughter, but not her husband. Later that night at dinner, Vimla is happy that all three of her children, along with her grandchildren, are with her, until Sunaina reveals the real reason she came was to protect her inheritance upon her mother's remarriage. This leads to Sunaina arguing with Jeevan and Naag about financial duties and what they believe they are owed as Vimla's children. Upset, Vimla writes her confession so her children will read it in the morning.

Later that night, Tony is released from jail and tells his grandfather he is in Shimla, but plans to return. However, when he goes to the Ahuja family to gather his luggage, he reads Vimla's confession letter, and goes to her friends to confirm the story. Tony changes his mind about leaving, and decides to help Vimla and Devarajan so her children will no longer take her for granted.

Tony helps ramp up the Ahujas' concerns about Vimla's marriage to "Captain Reddy" by having him move into the house, announce sharp meal times, sit at the head of the dinner table where Vimla's first husband sat, and prepare to discard the Ahuja's childhood clothes and trophies. The Ahujas discuss stopping the wedding with a lawyer, and the lawyer suggests obtaining a doctor's note claiming Vimla is mentally unfit to marry. Meanwhile, Kannu discovers that Devarajan is not Captain Reddy, and asks Tony to help investigate. Tony, Devarajan, Vimla, and her friends orchestrate a new lie: Vimla became addicted to gambling, and accrued a debt of 170 million rupees to Devarajan, whom she met as "Captain Reddy", and is marrying Devarajan in exchange for clearing her debt. The Ahujas are unsure what to do, but their children express disappointment in their parents' recent thoughts and actions.

Early the next day, the Ahujas try to sell their property and borrow money to eliminate Vimla's debt. Upon hearing that Vimla plans to permanently leave Shimla after the wedding, the Ahujas head to Vimla's house, meeting Tony's grandfather and the Kalra family en route. At Vimla's house, Vimla gives them the inheritance paperwork Sunaina brought her. The Ahujas hug her and beg her to stay, saying they can live without their money, but not without their mother. Vimla relents and tells the Ahujas the truth, with Tony giving them the confession letter. The Ahujas quickly forgive her, as they realized what she did was necessary for them to understand her feelings. As Tony plans to leave with his family, Kannu stops him, and asks him to marry her, to which he happily accepts. The movie ends with Vimla in her dining room, surrounded by her family, happy to be with her.

== Cast ==
- Neetu Kapoor as Vimla Ahuja
- Kapil Sharma as Tony Kalra
- Sadia Khateeb as Kanika "Kannu" Ahuja
- Riddhima Kapoor Sahni as Sunaina Ahuja
- R. Sarathkumar as Col. Theeran Devarajan
- Yograj Singh as Ponty "Bauji" Kalra
- Deepak Dutta as Jeevan Ahuja
- Tejaswini Kolhapure as Romal Jeevan Ahuja
- Jitender Hooda as Naag Ahuja
- Aditi Mittal as Baby Naag Ahuja
- Nikhat Khan as Shakti Kapoor
- Flora Jacob as Mrs. Malhotra
- Vidhaan Sharma as Bittu Ahuja
- Anukreethy Vas as Tina
- Praveen Kaour as Mrs. Chauhan
- Ishan Chadha as Bobby Ahuja
- Ali as Captain Adivishnu Reddy
- Nischay Ralhan as Gaggu

== Production ==
Principal photography of Daadi Ki Shaadi took place in 2025, with major portions of the film shot in Shimla. The filming schedule progressed through mid-2025, during which the cast and crew completed significant outdoor sequences. According to reports, the main shoot was largely completed by late 2025, with only patchwork and a final end-credit song remaining. The film was scheduled to wrap production by January 2026 following the completion of these remaining sequences.

== Soundtrack ==
Daadi Ki Shadi

Soundtrack album by Heer, Amaan Noor, Payal Dev, Aditya Dev Gulraj Singh and Joi Barua
- Released: April 24, 2026
- Genre: Feature film soundtrack
- Length: 27:03
- Language: Hindi
- Label: Warner Music India

Official audio

Track listing
No.	Title	Lyrics	Music	Singer(s)	Length
1.	"Sajda"	Youngveer	Heer, Amaan Noor	Romy, Goldboy	4:05
2.	"Senti"	Payal Dev, Aditya Dev, Mohsin Shaikh	Payal Dev, Aditya Dev	Payal Dev, Divya Kumar	3:45
3.	"Sweetheart Bole"	Manoj Yadav	Gulraj Singh	Sukhwinder Singh	5:09
4.	"Suno Naa Dil"	Manoj Yadav	Gulraj Singh	Sonu Nigam, Sunidhi Chauhan	3:40
5.	"Khudgarziyaan"	Jyotica Tangri	Joi Barua	Rekha Bharadwaj, Joi Barua	4:01
Total length:					27:03

== Release ==
The film was released theatrically on 8 May 2026.

== Reception ==
Anuj Kumar of The Hindu observed that the film "stops short of being a true joyful rebellion." Sreeju Sudharkaran of Rediff.com rated it 1.5/5 stars and commented that the film "offers an outdated plot that fails to deliver on humour or emotional depth. Shubhra Gupta of The Indian Express gave 2 stars out of 5 and writes that "Neetu Kapoor and daughter Riddhima Kapoor Sahni's debut is let down by weak writing, and flat TV sitcom treatment, which lectures instead of entertaining." Sana Farzeen of India Today rated it 2.5/5 stars and said that the film "has a few genuinely funny moments and heartfelt emotions, but it ultimately becomes a drag because it cannot decide what it truly wants to say."

Archika Khurana of The Times of India gave it 3 stars out of 5 and writes that the film "carries an important message about acceptance, companionship, and the emotional neglect of the elderly. It has sincerity, warmth, and a few genuinely touching moments." Devesh Sharma of Filmfare rated it 3/5 stars and said that "For all its over-the-top execution, the film’s compassion ultimately shines through. It may exhaust you with its noise but it also reminds you, quite movingly at times, that growing old should not mean becoming invisible within one’s own family." Bollywood Hungama gave 1.5 stars and said that the film "suffers from a flimsy script, ineffective humour and an emotional core that fails to connect."
