= Shikara (2020 film) =

2020 film directed by Vidhu Vinod Chopra

- Theatrical release poster
- Directed by: Vidhu Vinod Chopra
- Screenplay by: Vidhu Vinod Chopra; Rahul Pandita; Abhijat Joshi
- Story by: Vidhu Vinod Chopra
- Produced by: Vidhu Vinod Chopra
- Starring: Aadil Khan; Sadia Khateeb
- Cinematography: Rangarajan Ramabadran
- Edited by: Vidhu Vinod Chopra; Shikhar Misra
- Music by: Score: A. R. Rahman; Qutub-E-Kripa; Songs: Sandesh Shandilya; Abhay Sopori; Rohit Kulkarni
- Production company: Vinod Chopra Films
- Distributed by: Fox Star Studios
- Release date: 7 February 2020 (India)
- Running time: 120 minutes
- Country: India
- Language: Hindi
- Box office: est. ₹8.15 crore

Shikara is a 2020 Indian Hindi-language romantic drama film produced and directed by Vidhu Vinod Chopra. The film is based on the Exodus of Kashmiri Hindus of 1990. The story revolved around the love story of Shanti and Shiv Dhar, who are Kashmiri Pandits in the backdrop of the Exodus of Kashmiri Pandits from Kashmir. The book Our Moon Has Blood Clots by Rahul Pandita has inspired many parts of the movie. Upon its release, Shikara received widespread criticism, especially from the Kashmiri Pandit community. While it was praised for its cinematography and performances, it was considered a "sanitised take" on the exodus for leaving out the brutal details of its source material and focusing on a love story instead.

== Plot ==
=== September 2018 (present) ===
The movie starts with an aged teacher Dr. Shiv Kumar Dhar writing a letter to the President of the United States explaining to him the situation of Kashmiri Pandits who are living like refugees in their own country. It turns out that he has written several letters since the year 1990. His most recent letter received a response from POTUS and inviting him over to a presidential suite in Agra. He along with Shanti leave for Agra. In their palatial room they see a movie DVD, Love in Kashmir, and recalls their first meet, marriage in Kashmir and forced exodus to Jammu.

=== Flashback ===
==== 1987 and 1988 ====
On the set of Love in Kashmir, Shiv Kumar Dhar, then a young college professor and Ph.D student meets a nurse Shanti Sapru. They soon becomes friends with each other in their very first meet out of their love for poetry and Shiv being the author to newly published "Shikara". Soon they fall for each other and Shiv proposes to Shanti with the help of his best friend Lateef Lone, an aspiring cricketer and the son of a local politician who is like a fatherly figure to Shiv. Soon they get married in a traditional Kashmiri Pandit wedding and Lateef falls for Shanti's best friend Arti (another Kashmiri Pandit girl who is also her fellow nurse).

==== 1989 ====
They soon build a huge mansion with the help of Lateef's father and names it "Shikara" (owing to their first night spent on a shikara). The entire community including Hindus and Muslims live together in harmony. On their first marriage anniversary Shiv's cousin, Naveen, a doctor gifts him a typewriter to write his thesis on it. However their happiness was short lived as Lateef's father, a politician who is out for a rally is fatally injured and gets admitted at Naveen's clinic. It is stated that the police attacked him on the behest of the current central government. However he dies while being shifted to a multi-speciality hospital for his surgery. Lateef cannot bear the loss of his father and crosses the border to Lahore to get trained as a militant. This incident changes the peaceful valley.

==== 1990 ====
Shiv notices a lot of muslim students absent during his lectures. Shanti is also made to cover her head and remove her bindi by a group of militants while returning home from her clinic in a bus. It is there she finds out that there are illegal direct buses from Srinagar, India to Rawalpindi and Lahore in Pakistan. She even witnesses a shootout that kills 6 police officers trying to stop young men from boarding these buses to militancy. Shiv is kidnapped by a few of his missing students and taken to meet Lateef who is now leading a group of militants against the Kashmiri Pandits. He warns Shiv to leave the valley before it is too late, and he is only doing so since they were friends in the past. Shiv still believes that the Kashimiri Pandits are safe, and all these changes are temporary. However, he had misjudged the situation. A hit-list is released warning all Kashmiri Pandits to leave Kashmir valley in a month. Soon houses of Kashimiri Pandits are burnt down. Naveen is killed by millitants in front of Shiv's eyes leaving him shocked. Shiv and Shanti, along with the rest of their family manage to escape to Jammu where Arti's family breaks news of her murder by militants to them. The couple that once resided in a huge mansion is now reduced to living in tents. They see rich and affluent Kashmiri Pandits struggling to get something as simple as tomatoes. It is at this moment Shiv starts writing letters to the POTUS (George H. W. Bush then serving as the President) by the typewriter gifted by Naveen to tell them about the miserable conditions of refugees.

==== 1992 ====
Shiv completes his Ph.D. and decides to take a new job at Punjab University. However Shanti encourages him to teach the local refugee students. Soon he gets a call to sell his house "Shikara" at a hefty cost to the local Kashmiri Muslims to which he denies remembering Lateef's father and Naveen's deaths and takes back one of the broker wearing Naveen's coat which former promised to gift him after he completes his Ph.D.

==== 2008 ====
Over the years the Dhars get habituated to live in refugee quarters with Shiv continuing to teach local refugee students and writing letters to POTUS (now Barack Obama) while Shanti starts showing signs of having PTSD due to the horrible night prior to their exodus. One night, Shiv and Shanti are called upon by the Indian Army to meet with a now captured and terminally ill terrorist Lateef in Kashmir Valley. Shiv talks to Lateef, but Lateef dies soon after. Shiv and Shanti also visit their home "Shikara" which has now been taken over by their once trusted neighbour. Shiv and Shanti are shocked to see how their neighbour, who they treated like family, has changed everything they had built together.

==== 2018 (few months back to present) ====
Back in refugee towers, happiness comes their way when one of their neighbour's daughter is getting married. Shanti is excited to witness a Kashimiri Pandit wedding after three decades and wears her wedding sari for same. However, the wedding is nothing like what she imagined. There is a DJ, bright lights, loud music etc. The despair of losing not just her home but also her culture is evident on her face, and she soon collapses. It turns out that she is suffering from a neurological issue and needs surgery by one of the local refugee doctor who was once a student to Shiv in refugee quarters.

=== September 2018 and later on ===
It is before the surgery that the couple received a call from the POTUS and went to live in the presidential suite. There Shiv reveals to her that it was him who booked the hotel and the postman got confused by the term "presidential suite" assuming that the president had invited them over. It was their 30th wedding anniversary and he wanted to fulfill her long pending dream of seeing the Taj Mahal. Shanti asks him how he managed to pay for the suite which costs around 1.25 lakhs. Shiv reveals that he sold "Shikara" for her surgery and used some of the money to fulfill her wish. Shanti is dejected but doesn't say anything. Later Shiv takes her on a boat ride to Taj Mahal (just like their wedding night where he had taken her to Shikara). Shanti passes away in his arms on the boat.

Shiv takes Shanti's ashes to Kashmir like he had promised her and decides to stay in his ancestral home. He starts teaching young boys there hoping that they don't turn into terrorists like his best friend did.

== Cast ==
- Aadil Khan as Professor Dr. Shiv Kumar Dhar (Shanti's husband)
- Sadia Khateeb as Shanti Sapru Dhar (Shiv's wife; Deenanath's daughter; a nurse)
- Zamir Ashai as Khursheed Hassan Lone (Shiv's fatherly figure, Lateef's father; local politician who dies right before exodus paving way for Lateef to become a terrorist from an innocent aspiring cricketer)
- Zain Khan Durrani as Lateef Lone (Shiv's best friend; Khursheed's son; Arti's love interest; former local cricketer turned terrorist)
- Priyanshu Chatterjee as Dr. Naveen Zutshi (Shiv's cousin; a reputed doctor who gets murdered in the massacre)
- Vinay Raina as Shiv's Father
- Bhavana Chauhan as Arti (Shanti's best friend, Lateef's love interest; a nurse)
- Ashwin Dhar as Mohanlal
- Farid Azad Khan as Rehmana
- Saghar Sehrai as Haji Sahab
- Mushtaq Kak as Masood Sahab
- Anjana Sood as Shiv's mother
- Faiyaz Dilbar as Deenanath Sapru (Shanti's father)
- Shahid Lateef as Yunus
- Ajay Kaul as Manoharlal Kaul
- Sandeep Verma as Registration Officer
- Rahul Kilam as Raina's Son
- Ravi Braroo as Raina Sahab

== Production ==
In March 2018, it was reported that a film was shot under the title "Love and Letters" in Kashmir by Vidhu Vinod Chopra. In an interview later, he mentioned that almost entirely film was shot in Kashmir. Initially in Summer, then in autumn and again in Winter. Only refugee camps were recreated in Mumbai and some sequences in Agra, but this part of story is brief. Shots in Kashmir included several places such as the Lalit Hotel in Srinagar, on shikaras in the middle of a lake, on the backwaters of the Dal, in a desolate Hindu house, near Hazratbal and many more.

Some scenes were reported to be shot in Wandhama near Ganderbal, where one of the biggest massacres occurred in the Valley. Twenty-three Kashmiri Hindus – four children, nine women and ten men – were massacred in 1998.

Lead characters of Kashmiri birth, Aadil Khan and Sadia were cast to lend authenticity. Several Kashmiri Pandits were selected for principal cast. Also, to make refugee camps as similar as possible to the real ones 30 years ago (19 January 1990), actual refugees were cast. Approximately 4,000 out of 400,000 refugees, who are currently inhabitants of Jagti Nagrota Migrant Camp and other refugee camps agreed to take part. They were women, children and older people. Refugee camp scenes were shot for several days and nights in Bhagwati Nagar, Jammu.

== Music ==
Shikara

Soundtrack album by Sandesh Shandilya, Abhay Sopori and Rohit Kulkarni
- Released: 6 February 2020
- Recorded: 2019
- Genre: Feature film soundtrack
- Length: 24:07
- Language: Hindi
- Label: Zee Music Company
External audio
- Official Audio Jukebox on YouTube

The film score was composed by A. R. Rahman and his apprentice group Qutub-E-Kripa. This marked Rahman's first collaboration with Vidhu Vinod Chopra, 26 years after Rahman declined an offer by Chopra in 1994.

The film's songs are composed by Sandesh Shandilya, Abhay Sopori and Rohit Kulkarni with lyrics written by Irshad Kamil, Bashir Arif and Raqueeb Alam.

Track listing
No.	Title	Lyrics	Music	Singer(s)	Length
1.	"Mar Jaayein Hum"	Irshad Kamil	Sandesh Shandilya	Papon, Shradha Mishra	3:58
2.	"Ghar Bhara Sa Lage"	Irshad Kamil	Sandesh Shandilya	Papon, Shreya Ghoshal	3:47
3.	"Shukrana Gul Khile"	Bashir Arif	Abhay Sopori	Munir Ahmad Mir	2:36
4.	"Chattar Pattar"	Raqueeb Alam	Rohit Kulkarni	Mika Singh	3:38
5.	"Teri Arzoo Mein"	Irshad Kamil	Sandesh Shandilya	Papon, Kaushiki Chakraborty	4:07
6.	"Ae Wadi Shehzadi"	Irshad Kamil	Sandesh Shandilya	Papon	3:35
7.	"Umr Guzri"	Irshad Kamil	Sandesh Shandilya	Aadil Khan	2:26
Total length:					24:07

== Release ==
The film was released on 7 February 2020. It was released digitally on 4 April 2020, on Amazon Prime Video in India.

== Reception ==
=== Critical reception ===
On the review aggregator website Rotten Tomatoes, 55% of 11 critics' reviews are positive, with an average rating of 5.6/10. While the movie received mixed reviews from critics, the general audience and Kashmiri Pandits were critical of the film for failing to tell the story of the exodus, negative reactions were centered on unrealistic portrayals and for focusing on a love story than on the actual exodus.

The Times of India gave the movie 3 out of 5 stars, and called it largely a one-sided story which does cater to the cinematic appeal of certain movie-goers. Jyoti Kanyal of India Today also gives the movie 3 out of 5 stars and writes that the story "beautifully combines real incidents and a fictional love story". Both TOI and India Today praise debutantes Sadia and Aadil Khan. Newslaundry reviewed the film as a successful love story but a failed political drama. The Hindu gives a more critical review, saying that "Chopra buries politics under the garb of ‘love and hope’" and ends up making the movie simplistic. Livemint also comments on the 'simplification of politics behind the exodus' in the movie. Nandini Ramnath of Scroll.in also writes a similar review, weak in history, strong in love. Firstpost also gave the movie 3 out of 5 stars. According to The Wire, the film is "a poetically told tale that somewhere loses its way".

In a screening of the film especially for Kashmiri Pandits, a woman broke down and lashed out at director Vidhu Vinod Chopra (also present there) for not depicting the brutality of the exodus. The video went viral across social media.

=== Box office ===
Shikara earned ₹1.20 crore at the domestic box office on its opening day. On the second day, the film collected ₹1.85 crore. On the third day, the film collected ₹1.90 crore, taking total opening weekend collection to ₹4.95 crore. The lifetime collection of the film in net gross India was ₹8.15 crore.

== See also ==
- The Kashmir Files, 2022 Indian film also about the exodus
