= Bhajan Sopori =

Indian instrumentalist (1948–2022)

Pt. Bhajan Sopori
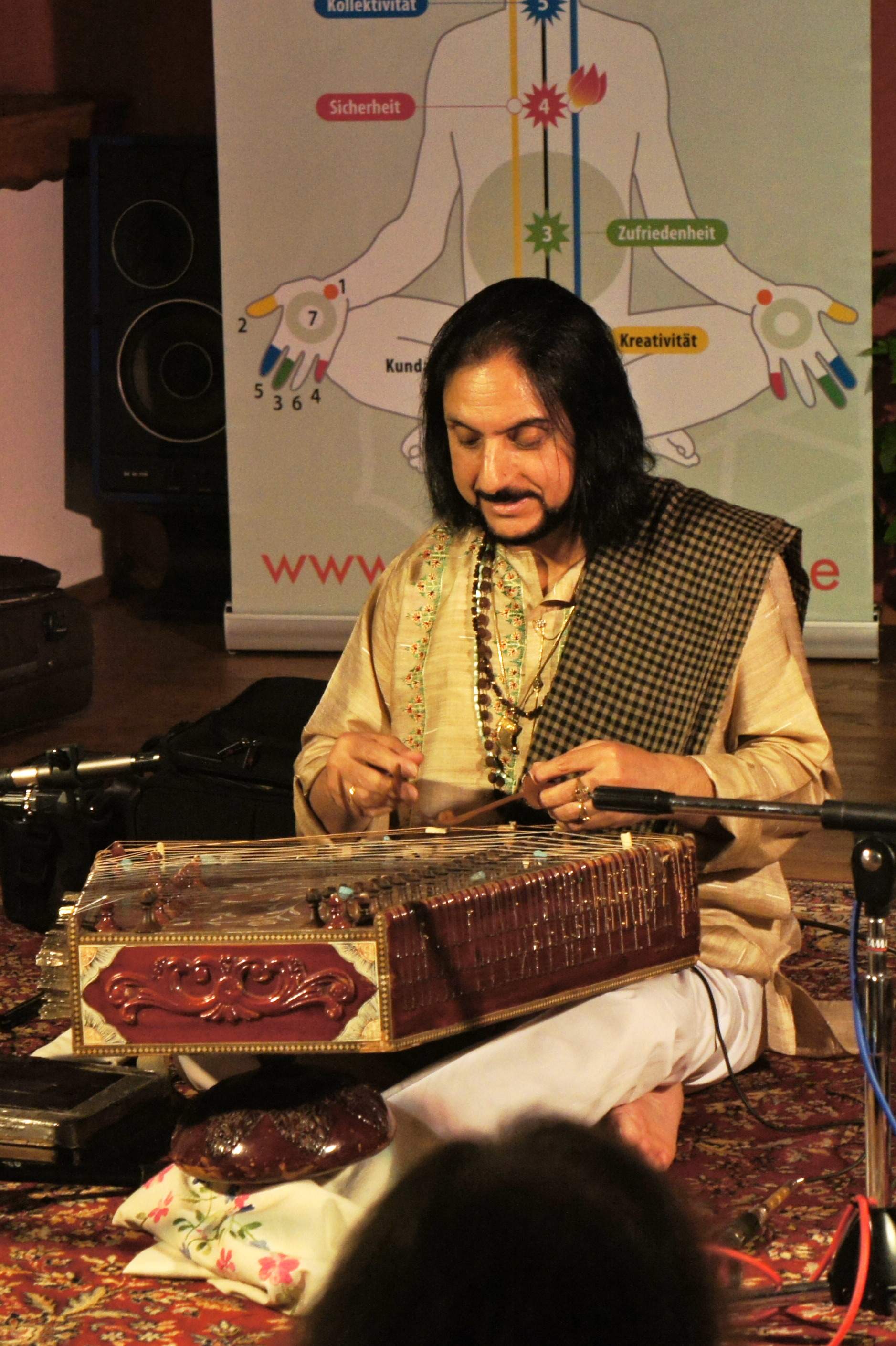
- Sopori in 2013

Background information
- Born: Bhajan Lal Sopori; 22 June 1948; Srinagar, Jammu and Kashmir, India
- Origin: Kashmiri
- Died: 2 June 2022 (aged 73) Gurugram, Haryana, India
- Genres: Hindustani classical music and Sufiyana Music
- Occupation: Musician
- Instrument: Santoor

Pandit Bhajan Sopori (22 June 1948 – 2 June 2022) was an Indian instrumentalist, musicologist, composer, and teacher. He was a player of the santoor, an ancient stringed musical instrument.

== Early life and family ==
Sopori was born in Srinagar into a Kashmiri Pandit family to Shambhu Nath Sopori on 22 June 1948. Sopori hailed from Sopore in the Baramulla district of the Kashmir Valley and traced his lineage to ancient Santoor experts. He belonged to the Sufiana gharana of Indian classical music. His family has played santoor for over six generations. His first public performance was at a conference organised by Prayag Sangeet Samiti & the University of Allahabad when he was 10 years old.

== Career ==
Sopori gave his first public performance in 1953, at the age of five. He learned western classical music from Washington University in St. Louis & Hindustani from his grandfather S.C. Sopori and father Shambhoo Nath. Sopori has taught music at Washington University. His performances have been broadcast in India and seen by both cultural associations there and by audiences in countries such as Belgium, Egypt, England, Germany, Norway, Syria and the USA. Sopori stated that "he worked with All India Radio in 1990, when he was transferred to Delhi," and that "no music was produced from the valley. There was not even a tabla player to accompany him" when he returned.

== Sopori Baaj ==
A result of decades of experimentation and innovation, Sopori's Santoor and its playing style (now known as 'Sopori Baaj') stands out for its further adoption of Dhrupad aesthetics, and its variety of kalam (wooden mallets).

Originating from the Santoor used in Sufiana Mausiqi, the Sopori Santoor is essentially an expanded version, covering more than 5 1/2 octaves, adorned with certain classical innovations including an attached tumba (goard) to enhance the posture and bass of the instrument (also used for Sitar and other Hindustani Classical instruments), sympathetic strings (or 'tarab', also found on many instruments in the Hindustani tradition), and thick strings that produce a singing glide when pressure is applied, an emulation of a technique that is essential in Indian music called Meend.

Like Dhrupad, the Sopori Baaj places much emphasis on the Raag Alaap (the elaboration of a Raga without percussion), using a heavier pair of kalam to enhance the sustain of a single note. Sopori's Santoor playing style is also unique in its consistent use of the Pakhawaj along with Tabla for accompaniment. During exploration of the composition, the Sopori style favors virtuosity on rhythm and the splitting of musical time, generously employing string muting and rapid movements throughout.

== Music Academy, SaMaPa ==
Pandit Sopori, considered as the cultural link between Jammu and Kashmir and rest of India, also ran a music academy called SaMaPa (Sopori Academy for Music and Performing Arts), which is actively involved in promoting Indian classical music. SaMaPa is involved in promoting music with jail inmates, with the objective of using music for healing the prisoners and creating an emotional bond between the society & the prisoners. The academy has trained several musicians and revived old instruments. It was presented the state government dogri award in 2011. Bhajan Sopori, in 2015, announced the SaMaPa awards for contribution to the field of music.

== Awards ==
Sopori was awarded the Sangeet Natak Akademi Award in 1992 and the Padma Shri in 2004. In 2009 he was honoured with the Baba Allaudin Khan Award. He was also awarded the M N Mathur award in 2011 for his contribution to Indian classical music and Jammu and Kashmir State lifetime achievement award.

== Personal life and death ==
Sopori was married and had two sons. His son Abhay Rustum Sopori is also a santoor player. Sopori died in Gurugram from colon cancer on 2 June 2022 at the age of 73.
