= Batt Koch =

2025 Indian film by Siddharth Koul and Ankit Wali

- Directed by: Siddharth Koul; Ankit Wali
- Written by: Siddharth Koul
- Produced by: Vinayak Razdan
- Starring: M. K. Raina; Anil Koul Chingari; Kusum Tikoo; Sakshi Bhat; Kusum Dhar; Ravin Bhat
- Cinematography: Anant Jain
- Edited by: Akanksha Zadoo
- Music by: Saurabh Zadoo
- Release dates: November 2025 (International Film Festival, Srinagar)
- Country: India
- Language: Kashmiri

Batt Koch (The Lost Lane; transl. Pandit Street) is a 2025 Indian Kashmiri-language drama film directed by Siddharth Koul and Ankit Wali. The film portrays the everyday life of a displaced Kashmiri Hindu family in Jammu, decades after the 1990s forced displacement of their community from their homeland in the Kashmir Valley due to militant violence, and their eventual visit back to their crumbling abandoned ancestral neighbourhood in Anantnag. Produced by Vinayak Razdan, the film stars M. K. Raina, Anil Koul Chingari, Kusum Tikoo, Sakshi Bhat, Kusum Dhar and Ravin Bhat. It premiered at the International Film Festival in Srinagar in November 2025 and had a theatrical release later in March 2026.

== Cast ==
- M. K. Raina as Poshkar Nath Koul, the Koul family patriarch
- Kusum Dhar as Jai Kishori Koul, Poshkar Nath's wife and the Koul family matriarch
- Anil Koul Chingari as Rajesh Koul, Poshkar Nath's son
- Kusum Tikoo as Neelam Koul, Rajesh's wife
- Sakshi Bhat as Osheen Koul, granddaughter
- Ravin Bhat as Nitin Koul, grandson

== Production ==
=== Development ===
The film is written by Siddharth Koul, who co-directed it with Ankit Wali. The directors were inspired by their own experiences growing up in displaced Kashmiri Hindu households. Koul was also inspired by "the emotional relationship" of Amitabh Bachchan's character with his ancestral home in the 2015 film Piku to "explore a similar emotional truth" in Koul's own language, Kashmiri. It is produced by Vinayak Razdan.

=== Filming ===
The film was shot entirely in Jammu and Kashmir, on locations in Jammu in the Jammu region, and Anantnag, Pahalgam and Mattan in the Kashmir Valley. The Mattan temple also features in the film. The film's climax was shot in the house of a relative of director Ankit Wali.

Most of the cast and crew of the film consisted Kashmiri Pandits, many of whom were born after the 1990s forced displacement of their community from the Kashmir Valley and were visiting their homeland for the first time while shooting for the film. M. K. Raina, who plays the protagonist and lived through the displacement, has been visiting and working with youth in the region since 2000. On realising that the younger people in the team had never visited their homeland before, Raina noted that "driving up from Jammu, the mountains started looming into view and they seemed to be in such awe." The family of Sakshi Bhat, one of the actors in the main cast, had fled their village in Kulgam in 2000; Sakshi had attended school there before their displacement.

=== Music ===
The film's musical score was composed by Saurabh Zadoo. The soundtrack includes two original songs composed for the film, while several old Kashmiri folk songs also feature in the film. Ravi Bhat wrote the lyrics for the original songs.

=== Post-production ===
The film received 'U' certification from the Central Board of Film Certification (CBFC) of India on 30 December 2025. While beginning the certification process earlier in October, the film's directors realised that CBFC did not have a separate language category for Kashmiri films, which they decided to challenge. With the intervention of Information and Broadcasting minister Ashwini Vaishnaw, Kashmiri as well as all remaining languages from the 8th Schedule of the Indian Constitution were added to the portal, and the film became the first to be certified as a Kashmiri-language film by CBFC.

== Release ==
The film premiered at the International Film Festival in Srinagar in November 2025. It was screened in Jammu in February 2026. In May 2026, it was selected and screened at the New York Indian Film Festival, where it was nominated for best debut feature film with M. K. Raina being nominated for best actor for his role.

=== Theatrical ===
The film had a theatrical release in March 2026 across several Indian cities. It was also screened in several cities in America.

== Reception ==
Reviewing the film for Frontline, Rayan Naqash found the film to be 'authentically Kashmiri' and wrote that the film "uses memory as a tool against forgetfulness" and "invites the viewer to pause and consider the weight of a displaced family planning a trip to Kashmir as tourists." Sagarika Kissu of The Print wrote that the film "brings to the screen the lives of a forgotten community living in the bylanes of Jammu" and "captures its enduring connection to Kashmir". Ayushya Kaul, reviewing for High on Films, rated the film 4.5 stars out of 5 and wrote that it "does an undeniable job of talking about the pain, loss, suffering, and trauma of Kashmiri Pandits sensitively and gently." Rohini Vaishnavi of Daily Excelsior wrote that the film "treats its sensitive themes with remarkable restraint, compassion and emotional clarity." Ravinder Kaul, also writing for Daily Excelsior, praised the acting by the film's cast as well as the film's direction, soundtrack and production. He wrote that the film "resists making experience into statement" and asks the audience to "to dwell - within confusion, within memory, within the uncomfortable space between past and present."
