= M. K. Raina =

Indian theatre actor and director

- Raina at IGNCA, Delhi in 2015
- Born: Maharaj Krishna Raina; 1948 (age 77–78); Srinagar, Jammu and Kashmir, India
- Education: National School of Drama
- Years active: 1969–present
- Awards: Sangeet Natak Akademi Award - Direction 1995

Maharaj Krishen Raina (born 1948), popularly known as M. K. Raina, is an Indian theatre actor and director. Raina graduated from National School of Drama in 1970 with the Best Actor award.

== Early life ==
Maharaj Krishna Raina was born in 1948 in the city of Srinagar of the princely state of Jammu and Kashmir, Union of India. Maharaj completed his college in Srinagar and then moved to NSD in Delhi on a state scholarship. Raina, born into a Kashmiri Pandit family, comes from a family background of doctors and engineers. His father was a political activist this influenced Raina into social activism.

== Career and work ==
=== Theatre and drama ===
After graduating from the National School of Drama in 1970, Raina commenced on his work in Indian parallel cinema 27 Down, in which he also plays the lead role of "Sanjay". He has produced over 150 plays in 12 languages.

As an actor, he has worked in more than a hundred plays. He has directed several memorable productions like Kabira Khada Bazar Mein, Karmawali, Pari Kukh, Kabhi Na Chooden Khet and The Mother, Bhanbhatt Ki Atmakatha, Godan, Muavze, Tum Saadat Hasan Manto Ho, Badshah Pather, Stay Yet A While, Baaki Itihaas, Hiroshima, Hatya Ek Aakar Ki, The Great Trial. His production encompass the works of Sanskrit classic plays, folk theatre and classic international playwrights like Shakespeare, Ibsen, Chekov, Lorca, Brecht. Andha Yug, which he directed, was performed in Berlin and the Festival of India in the USSR. He was a Fellow and also produced Jasma Odan at Hawaii University in 1986. His films as actor include 27 Down, Satah Se Uthta Aadmi, Ek Ruka Hua Faisla, Tamas, Titli, Genesis, Tarang, Ankur Maina aur Kabootar, Taare Zameen Par, Rab Ne Banadi Jodi, Aisha, Noor, Lakshya, Teen Aur Aadha, Exchange Offer (short). He has also acted in the acclaimed web series The Forgotten Army for Amazon Prime.

=== Cultural activist ===
Besides being a practising actor/director in theatre and media, he is known also as a cultural activist. Raina believes that culture is a counterpoint to the violence and terrorism around us.

=== Academia ===
He has been a visiting director at the National School of Drama, Hyderabad Central University, IIT Hyderabad and Chhattisgarh among others.

He was the Scholar in Residence at Jamia Milia Islamia. He was also Fellow at the Stanford University (USA).

== Awards ==
He has received the Sanskriti Samman in 1980, the Sahitya Kala Parishad Award in 1981, Best Director of the year by West Bengal Government 1982 and the Best Director's award of Punjabi Akademi, Delhi in 1987.

M. K. Raina received the Sangeet Natak Akademi award in 1995 and the Swarna Padak from the Govt. of Jammu and Kashmir in 1996 for his contribution to Indian Theater.

He was also awarded one of India's highest theatre awards, the B. V. Karanth award for lifetime achievement in 2007.

The Delhi Government awarded him the Hindi Akademi Shikhar Samman in 18.

== Filmography ==
- Everybody Loves Sohrab Handa (2026)
- Batt Koch (2025)
- Tanaav (2022)
- Gangubai Kathiawadi (2022)
- Prassthanam (2019) as Jaiprakash Kedar
- Three and Half/Teen Aur Aadha (2018) as Old Man
- Noor (2017) as Noor's father
- Aisha (2010) as Aisha's father
- Rab Ne Bana Di Jodi (2008) as Taani's father (Special Appearance)
- Taare Zameen Par (2007) as Headmaster
- Lakshya (2004) as Romi's father (Special Appearance)
- Main Azaad Hoon (1989) as Newspaper employee
- Genesis (1986) as The trader
- Ek Ruka Hua Faisla (1986) as Juror #7
- New Delhi Times (1986)
- Aghaat (1985)
- Giddh: The Vulture (1984) as Masterji
- Tarang (1984) as Abdul
- Tasveer Apni Apni (1984) (TV) as Office Manager
- Satah Se Uthata Aadmi (1980) as Keshav
- 27 Down (1974) as Sanjay
- Kasba (1991) as Kashinath
