= Siddhartha Gigoo =

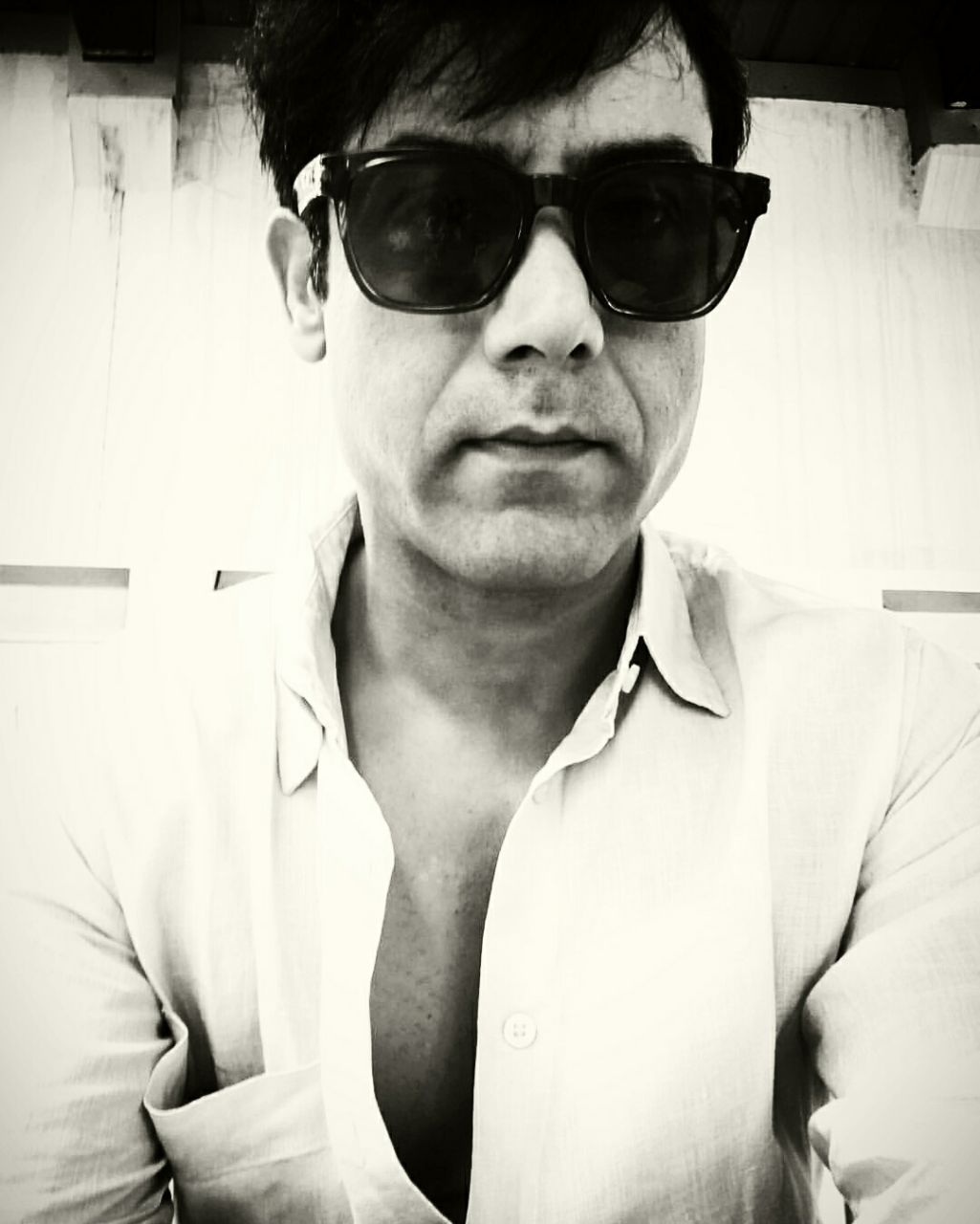
- Born: 1974 (age 51–52); Srinagar, State of Jammu & Kashmir (now Union Territory of Jammu & Kashmir), India
- Education: English Literature at Jawaharlal Nehru University
- Occupations: Filmmaker and Novelist
- Notable credit(s): Author of The Garden of Solitude & A Fistful of Earth and Other Stories

Siddhartha Gigoo is an Indian author and filmmaker. He studied English literature at Jawaharlal Nehru University, New Delhi, India. He is the author of two books of fiction, The Garden of Solitude (2011), and A Fistful of Earth and Other Stories (2015), which was longlisted for the Frank O'Connor International Short Story Award in 2015. His short story The Umbrella Man won the Commonwealth Short Story Prize (2015) for Asia. Two books of his poems, Fall and Other Poems and Reflections, were published by Writer's Workshop, Kolkata. ⁣⁣ His writings have appeared in several literary magazines.

Gigoo has also written and directed two short films. The Last Day, set against the backdrop of the exodus and exile of Kashmiri Pandits from their homeland Kashmir in 1990s. He was selected for the 6th International Documentary and Short Film Festival of Kerala, the 7th Annual FilmAid Film Festival (Kenya), the International Film Festival of Cinematic Arts–Short and Micro Cinema (Los Angeles), the 11th International Exile Film Festival (Sweden), the Kala Ghoda Arts Festival (Mumbai) and the Lucerne International Film Festival (Switzerland). The 8th International Documentary and Short Film Festival of Kerala (2015) selected his film "Goodbye, Mayfly" for the Competition section.
