= Our Moon Has Blood Clots =

2013 memoir by Rahul Pandita

Our Moon has Blood Clots : The Exodus of the Kashmiri Pandits
- Author: Rahul Pandita
- Language: English
- Publication date: 1 January 2013
- Publication place: India
- Media type: Print (Paperback)
- Pages: 258
- ISBN: 9788184000870

Our Moon has Blood Clots : The Exodus of the Kashmiri Pandits is a 2013 memoir by Indian author Rahul Pandita about the exodus of Kashmiri Hindus in the late 1989 and early 1990, as well as fleeing of Kashmiris a generation earlier as a result of raids by Pashtun tribesman.

== Reception ==
Manjula Narayan of Hindustan Times wrote: "The form contributes to much of the power of this book that speaks of the pain of fleeing a beloved home, incorporates moving descriptions of rituals specific to the Shaivite Pandits, and weaves in oral histories and snatches of poetry from, among others, Lal Ded and Agha Shahid Ali". Soutik Biswas of Mint gave a positive review and said, "Pandita writes evocatively about passing trucks filled with scared Pandits escaping to Jammu, the women “herded like cattle”, and a man showing the family his fist and wishing them death." He however felt that journalism was the "weakest link in what is a largely engaging memoir."

Amberish K Diwanji of Daily News and Analysis wrote that the book "Our Moon Has Blood Clots makes for difficult reading. Not only did the refugees suffer from government neglect, even their religious kindred in Jammu cared little for them and exploited them. Entire families, with five or six members, were put up in small rooms. There was no privacy, rents were exorbitant and water was rationed."
