= Panun Kashmir =

Proposed union territory of India

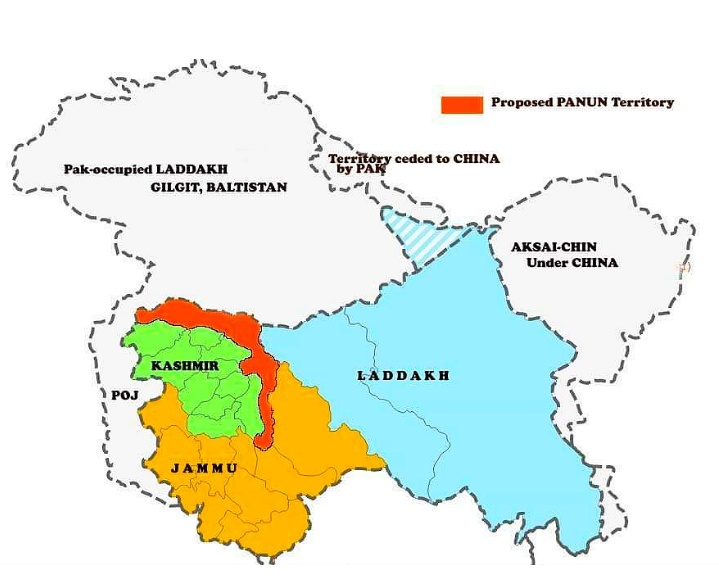
Proposed Panun Kashmir territory in Red

Panun Kashmir (English: Our Kashmir) is a proposed union territory of India in the Kashmir Valley, which is intended to be a homeland for Kashmiri Hindus. The demand arose after the Exodus of Kashmiri Hindus in 1990. The vision of the homeland was elucidated in the Margdarshan Resolution of 1991.

- Panun Kashmir is also the name of an eponymously named organization.

== Origin and etymology ==
Panun Kashmir is derived from Kashmiri panun kaśīr, which means "our own Kashmir". The Panun Kashmir organisation was founded by Kashmiri Hindus (known as Kashmiri Pandits) in 1990 after their exodus from Kashmir under the threat of militants. Approximately 90,000–100,000 Pandits of an estimated population of 120,000–140,000 left the Valley between January and March 1990, according to several scholarly estimates. However, Panun Kashmir estimates nearly 700,000 refugees.

Dr. Agnishekhar was the founder of the Panun Kashmir organisation.

== Proposed union territory of Panun Kashmir ==
The Panun Kashmir organisation passed "Margdarshan Resolution" ("Pathfinder Resolution") in Jammu in December 1991 with the following demands:

(a) the establishment of a Homeland for the Kashmiri Hindus in the Valley of Kashmir comprising the regions of the Valley to the East and North of Jhelum River.

(b) that the Constitution of India is made applicable in letter and spirit in this Homeland to ensure the right to life, liberty, freedom of expression and faith, equality, and the rule of law.

(c) that the Homeland be placed under the Central administration with a Union Territory status; and

(d) that all the seven hundred thousand Kashmiri Hindus, including those who have been driven out of Kashmir in the past and yearn to return to their homeland and those who were forced to leave on account of terrorist violence in Kashmir, be settled in the homeland on an equitable basis with dignity and honor.

Some advocates for Panun Kashmir wish that the majority of the valley of Kashmir and cities such as Srinagar, Anantnag, Sopore, Baramulla, and Awantipora be included in the proposed union territory. However, the organization claims that it does not seek a Hindu homeland. Instead, it seeks a homeland for Kashmiri Hindus who are ready to live peacefully with their Muslim neighbors assuming the conditions are met for resettlement.

== Support ==
The Panun Kashmir organization has consistently pushed for a separate UT. The organization also strongly supported the abrogation of Article 370 and Article 35a.

Ikkjutt Jammu, a former political party in Jammu and Kashmir, supported the creation of a separate Panun Kashmir, as well as the separation of Jammu Division from Kashmir.

== Opposition ==
After the murder of Rakesh Pandit by unidentified militants in June 2021, several members of the Panun Kashmir group proposed a military campaign to establish a separate Hindu region, where Kashmiri Pandits would be armed against local militants. That meeting and their proposed Union Territory have been opposed by Muslim activists, who compared the proposal to Israeli actions against the Palestinians.

== See also ==
- Hinduphobia
- Insurgency in Jammu and Kashmir
- List of districts of Jammu and Kashmir
- Persecution of Hindus
- Politics of Jammu and Kashmir
- Women's rights in Jammu and Kashmir
