= Exodus of Kashmiri Hindus =

Exodus of Hindus from the Kashmir Valley in the 1990s

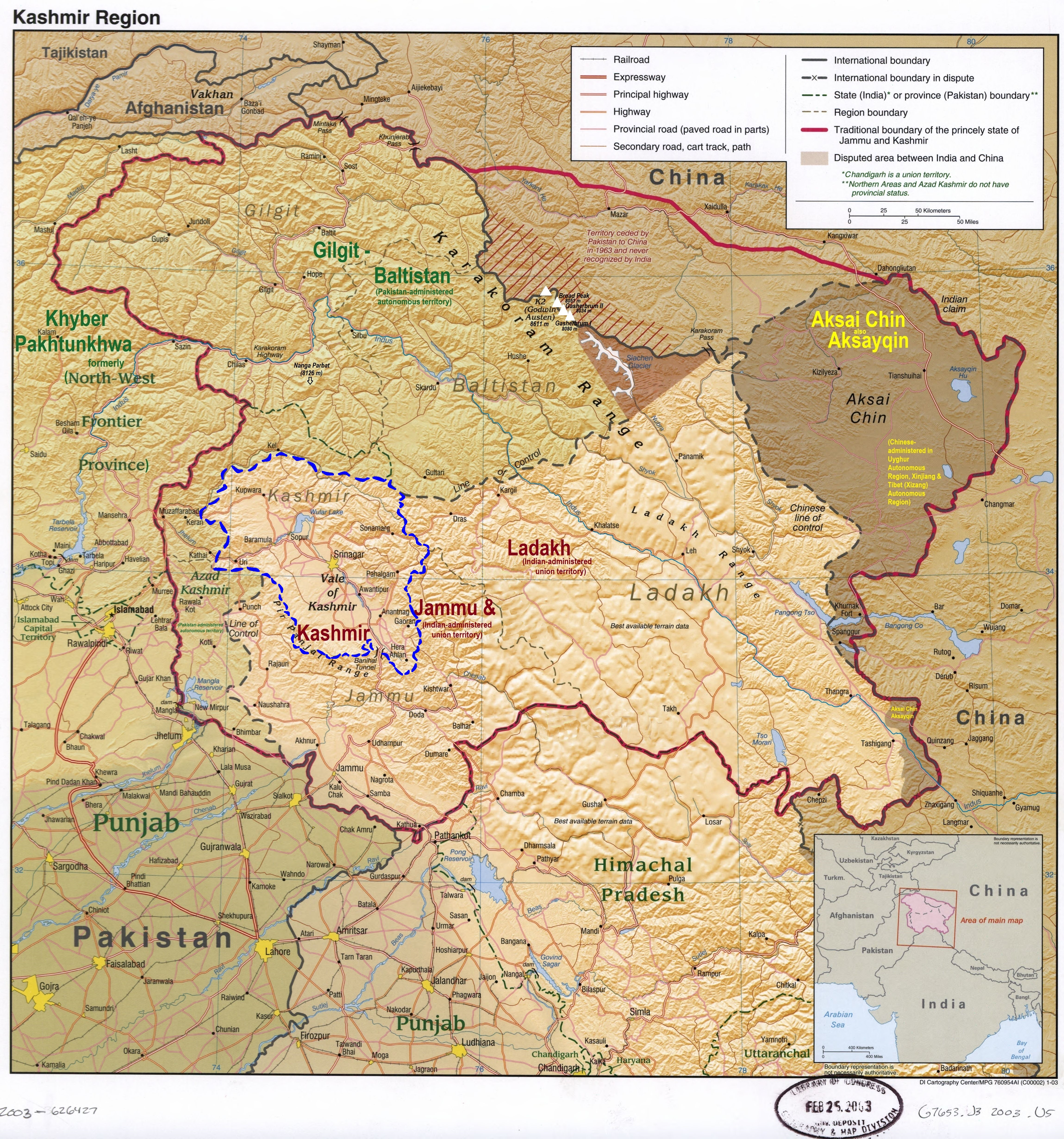
- Political map of the disputed Kashmir region showing the Kashmir Valley or Vale of Kashmir, in the Indian-administered Kashmir division (in neon blue), from which a large proportion of Hindus have migrated out
- Date: Early 1990
- Location: Kashmir Valley, Indian-administered Kashmir; 34.0333°N 74.6667°E
- Outcome: 90,000–100,000 Pandits of an estimated population of 120,000–140,000 fled the Valley between January and March 1990, according to several scholarly estimates.; Other scholars have suggested a higher figure of approximately 150,000 for the exodus. (Note: Still another estimates it to be 190,000 of a total population of 200,000. The CIA Factbook estimated the number to be 300,000.)
- Deaths: 30–80 Kashmiri Pandits had been killed by insurgents by mid-year 1990 when the exodus was largely complete, according to several scholars.; Indian Home Ministry data records 217 Hindus civilians fatalities during the four-year period, 1988 to 1991; another scholar estimates 228 Pandit civilian fatalities. Government of Jammu and Kashmir recorded 219 Pandit fatalities between 1989 and 2004.; According to Kashmiri Pandit Sangharsh Samiti (KPSS), an organisation representing those Pandits who have remained in the Valley, 650 Pandits were killed between 1989 and 2008.

The Exodus of Kashmiri Hindus, (Note: Oxford English Dictionary Online defines exodus as – "The departure or going out, usually of a body of persons from a country for the purpose of settling elsewhere. Cf. 'emigration n. 2': The departure of persons from one country, usually their native land, to settle permanently in another.) or Pandits, is their early-1990 migration, or flight, from the Muslim-majority Kashmir Valley in Indian-administered Kashmir following rising violence in an insurgency. Of a total Pandit population of 120,000–140,000 some 90,000–100,000 left the valley or felt compelled to leave by the middle of 1990, (Note: Kashmiri Pandits are not considered "refugees" as they have not crossed an international border. Many Pandits would like to be considered Internally Displaced Persons (IDPs), but the Indian government has denied them that status, fearing international involvement in Kashmir, which it considers to be its internal affair. The Indian government considers Kashmiri Pandits to be 'migrants.') by which time about 30–80 of them are said to have been killed by militants.

During the period of substantial migration, the insurgency was being led by a group calling for a secular and independent Kashmir, but there were also growing Islamist factions demanding an Islamic state. The Pandits, who believed that Kashmir's culture was tied to India's, experienced fear and panic set off by targeted killings of some members of their community—including high-profile officials among their ranks—and public calls for independence among the insurgents. The accompanying rumours and uncertainty together with the absence of guarantees for their safety by the state government might have been the latent causes of the exodus. (Note: Though some Hindu nationalist publications describe the violence as "genocide" or "ethnic cleansing", scholars such as Mohita Bhatia and Alexander Evans say these labels are incorrect or aggressive, that claims of destruction of Hindu temples are exaggerated, or that such labels are opportunistically appropriated by the Hindu nationalist Bhartiya Janata Party (BJP) for political means.)

The reasons for this migration are vigorously contested. In 1989–1990, as calls by Kashmiri Muslims for independence from India gathered pace, many Kashmiri Pandits, who viewed self-determination to be anti-national, felt under pressure. The killings in the 1990s of a number of Pandit officials, may have shaken the community's sense of security, although it is thought some Pandits—by virtue of their evidence given later in Indian courts—may have acted as agents of the Indian state. The Pandits killed in targeted assassinations by the Jammu and Kashmir Liberation Front (JKLF) included some high-profile ones. Religiously charged slogans in protest processions and from mosque loudspeakers, including some anti-Hindu calls asking the Pandits to leave Kashmir, caused panic among the Hindus. (Note: According to political scientist Reeta Tremblay, anti-Hindu declarations were made from local mosques. Political scientist Christopher Snedden says that while some slogans were certainly targeted at the Pandits, these may have been overemphasized; sociologist Goldie Osuri says that such sloganeering was irregular. Political scientist Rekha Chowdhary states that religious places were used for threatening and intimidating the minorities. According to social anthropologist Ankur Datta, slogans referred to by the Pandits were not reported or officially recorded at the time, and Muslims deny ever hearing such slogans. Political scientist Bilal Mir calls Pandit assertions of slogans from mosques asking people to leave unconfirmed.) News of threatening letters created fear, though in later interviews the letters were seen to have been sparingly received. There were disparities between the accounts of the two communities, the Pandits and the Muslims. Many Kashmiri Pandits believed they were forced out of the Valley either by Pakistan and the militants it supported or the Kashmiri Muslims as a group. Many Muslims in the Valley believed that the then Governor, Jagmohan had encouraged the Pandits to leave so as to have a free hand in more thoroughly pursuing reprisals against Muslims. Many Kashmiri Pandits felt increasingly targeted by the insurgents, and their mass flight split the valley along strict religious lines, ultimately staining a popular political uprising with the stigma of radicalism and crime. Many Kashmiri Muslims did not support violence against religious minorities, but they felt the departure of the Kashmiri Pandits offered an excuse for casting Kashmiri Muslims as Islamic radicals; (Note: Following the 1990 designation of Jammu and Kashmir as a disturbed area, intense militarisation altered the region's landscape as armed forces took over forests, temples, sports grounds, and cinemas for tactical bases, while checkpoints and village sieges restricted daily life.) some Kashmiri Muslims felt betrayed by the Pandits' flight. Several scholarly views attribute the migration to widespread panic among the Pandits, triggered by the violent environment and extremist religious rhetoric among some insurgents, alongside the absence of safety guarantees from the Governor.

Many Kashmiri Pandits initially moved to the Jammu Division, the southern half of Jammu and Kashmir, where they lived in refugee camps that were tented and lacked clean toilets, privacy, or daily needs like water. At the time of their exodus, very few Pandits expected their exile to last beyond a few months. As exile lasted longer, many displaced Pandits in the urban elite found jobs elsewhere in India, but those in the lower-middle class, especially from rural areas, languished longer in the camps, with some experiencing extreme poverty. The camps grew into cramped, single-room brick homes with basic shared amenities, housing a younger generation that struggled to find work or build a life in Jammu while remaining cut off from their past. This generated tensions with host communities—whose social and religious practices, although Hindu, differed from those of the brahmin Pandits—and rendered assimilation more difficult. Many displaced Pandits in the camps succumbed to emotional depression and a sense of helplessness. The cause of the Kashmiri Pandits was quickly taken up by right-wing Hindu groups in India, which also preyed on their insecurities and further alienated them from Kashmiri Muslims. Some displaced Kashmiri Pandits formed an organization called Panun Kashmir ("our own Kashmir"), which has called for a separate homeland for Kashmiri Hindus in the Valley, but has opposed autonomy for Kashmir on the grounds that it would encourage the formation of an Islamic state. The return to the homeland in Kashmir also constitutes one of the main points of the ruling Bharatiya Janata Party's election platform. (Note: Kashmiri Pandits are not considered "refugees" as they have not crossed an international border. Many would like to be considered Internally Displaced Persons (IDPs), but the Indian government has denied them that status, fearing international involvement in Kashmir, which it considers to be its internal affairs. The Indian government considers Kashmiri Pandits to be 'migrants.') Dialogue between Pandits and Muslims has been hindered by each community's emphasis on its own suffering and its reluctance to acknowledge the other's; displaced Pandits have reported feelings of isolation and loss of identity. Kashmiri Pandits in exile have written autobiographical memoirs, novels, and poetry to record their experiences and to understand them. 19 January is observed by Kashmiri Hindus as Exodus Day.

== Background ==
The Kashmir Valley, which is a part of the larger Kashmir region that has been the subject of a dispute between India and Pakistan from 1947, has been administered by India from approximately the same time. Before 1947, during the period of British Raj in India when Jammu and Kashmir was a princely state, Kashmiri Pandits, or Kashmiri Hindus, had stably constituted between 4% and 6% of the population of the Kashmir valley in censuses from 1889 to 1941; the remaining 94% to 96% were Kashmir valley's Muslims, overwhelmingly followers of Sunni Islam. These Muslims had the self-assured awareness of a predominant community; their support was considered consequential in a determination of Kashmir's future. By 1950, in the face of Kashmir's unresolved accession to India, the land reforms planned by the incoming administration of Sheikh Abdullah, and the threat of socio-economic decline, a large number of Pandits—whose elite owned over 30% of the arable land in the Valley—moved to other parts of India.

In 1989 a persisting insurgency began in Kashmir. It was fed by Kashmiri dissatisfaction with India's federal government over rigging an assembly election in 1987 and disavowing a promise of greater autonomy. The dissatisfaction overflowed into an ill-defined uprising against the Indian state. The Jammu and Kashmir Liberation Front (JKLF), an organization that had generally secular antecedents and the predominant goal of political independence, led the uprising but did not abjure violence. In early 1990, the vast majority of Kashmiri Hindus fled the valley in a mass-migration. (Note: According to several scholars, approximately 90,000–100,000 Pandits of an estimated population of 120,000–140,000 left in early 1990. Other scholars have suggested a higher figure of approximately 150,000 for the exodus.) (Note: Still another estimates it to be 190,000 of a total population of 200,000. The CIA Factbook estimated the number to be 300,000.) More of them left in the following years so that, by 2011, only around 3,000 families remained. 30 or 32 Kashmiri Pandits had been killed by insurgents by mid-March 1990 when the exodus was largely complete, according to some scholars. Indian Home Ministry data records 217 Hindu civilian fatalities during the four-year period, 1988 to 1991. (Note: Alexander Evans estimates 228 Pandit civilian fatalities, or 388 if the deaths of officials are included, but considers the higher figure of 700 to be gravely undependable The 20-year Hindu civilian fatalities following 1990 have been reported by scholars quoting Kashmiri Pandit organizations within the Kashmir valley to be 650, the tally including those who were suspected by the militants to have been Indian intelligence agents.)

Under the 1975 Indira–Sheikh Accord, Sheikh Abdullah agreed to measures previously undertaken by the central government in Jammu and Kashmir to integrate the state into India. Farrukh Faheem, a sociologist at the University of Kashmir, states that it was met with hostility among the people of Kashmir and laid the groundwork for the future insurgency. Those opposed to the accords included Jamaat-e-Islami Kashmir, People's League in Indian Jammu and Kashmir, and the Jammu Kashmir Liberation Front (JKLF) based in Pakistani-administered Azad Jammu and Kashmir. Since the mid-1970s, communalist rhetoric was being exploited in the state for votebank politics. Around this time, Pakistan's Inter-Services Intelligence (ISI) tried to spread Wahhabism in place of Sufism to foster religious unity within their nation, and the communalization aided their cause. Islamization of Kashmir began in the 1980s when Sheikh Abdullah's government changed the names of about 300 places to Islamic names. (Note: Other sources claim that he changed 2,500 place names.) Sheikh also started delivering communal speeches in mosques that were similar to his confrontational pro-independence speeches in the 1930s. Additionally, he referred to Kashmiri Hindus as mukhbir (Hindustani: मुख़बिर, مخبر), or informants of the Indian military.

The ISI's initial attempts to sow widespread unrest in Kashmir against the Indian administration were largely unsuccessful until the late-1980s. The American- and Pakistani-backed Afghan mujahideen's armed struggle against the Soviet Union in the Soviet–Afghan War, the Islamic Revolution in Iran and the Sikh insurgency in Indian Punjab against the Indian government became sources of inspiration for large numbers of Kashmiri Muslim youth. Both the pro-independence JKLF and pro-Pakistan Islamist groups including Jamaat-e-Islami Kashmir mobilized the rapidly-growing anti-Indian sentiments amongst the Kashmiri population; the year of 1984 saw a pronounced rise in terrorist violence in Kashmir. Following the execution of JKLF militant Maqbool Bhat in February 1984, strikes and protests by Kashmiri nationalists broke out in the region, where large numbers of Kashmiri youth participated in widespread anti-India demonstrations and consequently faced heavy-handed reprisals by state security forces.

Critics of the then chief minister, Farooq Abdullah, charged him with losing control of the situation. His visit to Pakistani-administered Kashmir during this time became an embarrassment, where according to JKLF's Hashim Qureshi, he shared a platform with the JKLF. Abdullah asserted that he went on behalf of Indira Gandhi and his father, so that sentiments there could "be known first hand", although few people believed him. There were also allegations that he had allowed Khalistani militants to train in Jammu, although these were never proved to be true. On 2 July 1984, Ghulam Mohammad Shah, who had support from Indira Gandhi, replaced his brother-in-law Farooq Abdullah and assumed the role of chief minister after Abdullah was dismissed, in what was termed a "political coup".

G. M. Shah's administration, which did not have people's mandate, turned to Islamists and opponents of India, notably the Molvi Iftikhar Hussain Ansari, Mohammad Shafi Qureshi and Mohinuddin Salati, to gain some legitimacy through religious sentiments. This gave political space to Islamists who previously lost overwhelmingly in the 1983 state elections. In 1986, Shah decided to construct a mosque within the premises of an ancient Hindu temple inside the New Civil Secretariat area in Jammu to be made available to the Muslim employees for 'Namaz'. People of Jammu took to streets to protest against this decision, which led to a Hindu-Muslim clash. In February 1986, Shah on his return to Kashmir valley retaliated and incited the Kashmiri Muslims by saying Islām khatre mẽ hai (transl. Islam is in danger). As a result, this led to the 1986 Kashmir riots where Kashmiri Hindus were targeted by the Kashmiri Muslims. Many incidents were reported in various areas where Kashmiri Hindus were killed and their properties and temples damaged or destroyed. The worst hit areas were mainly in South Kashmir and Sopore. During the Anantnag riot in February 1986, many houses and other properties belonging to Hindus were looted, burnt or damaged. An investigation of Anantnag riots revealed that members of the 'secular parties' in the state, rather than the Islamists, had played a key role in organising the violence to gain political mileage through religious sentiments. Shah called in the army to curb the violence, but it had little effect. His government was dismissed on 12 March 1986, by Governor Jagmohan following communal riots in south Kashmir, and led to Governor's rule in the state. The political fight was hence being portrayed as a conflict between "Hindu" New Delhi (Central Government), and its efforts to impose its will in the state, and "Muslim" Kashmir, represented by political Islamists and clerics.

For the 1987 state elections, various Islamist groups, including Jamaat-e-Islami Kashmir, organised themselves under the banner of Muslim United Front, with a manifesto to work for Islamic unity and against political interference from the centre. The two mainstrain parties (NC and INC) were allied together and won the election, However, the elections are widely believed to have been rigged in favour of the mainstream alliance and thus the government formed by Farooq Abdullah lacked legitimacy. The corruption and alleged electoral malpractices were the catalysts for an insurgency. The Kashmiri militants killed anyone who openly expressed pro-India policies. Kashmiri Hindus were targeted specifically because they were seen as presenting Indian presence in Kashmir because of their faith. Though the insurgency had been launched by JKLF, groups rose over the next few months advocating for establishment of Nizam-e-Mustafa (administration based on Sharia) on Islamist groups proclaimed the Islamicisation of socio-political and economic set-up, merger with Pakistan, unification of ummah and establishment of an Islamic Caliphate. Liquidation of central government officials, Hindus, liberal and nationalist intellectuals, social and cultural activists was described as necessary to rid the valley of un-Islamic elements. The relations among the mainstream parties and Islamist groups were generally poor and often hostile. The JKLF had also utilized Islamic formulations in its mobilization strategies and public discourse, using Islam and independence interchangeably. It demanded equal rights for everyone, however this had a distinct Islamic flavour as it sought to establish an Islamic democracy, protection of minority rights per Quran and Sunnah and an economy of Islamic socialism. The pro-separatist political practices at times deviated from their stated secular position.

== Insurgency activity ==
In July 1988, the Jammu Kashmir Liberation Front (JKLF) began a separatist insurgency for secession of Kashmir from India. The group targeted a Kashmiri Hindu for the first time on 14 September 1989, when they killed Tika Lal Taploo, an advocate and a prominent leader of Bharatiya Janata Party in Jammu and Kashmir, in front of several eyewitnesses. This instilled fear in the Kashmiri Hindus especially as Taploo's killers were never caught which also emboldened the terrorists. The Hindus felt that they were not safe in the valley and could be targeted any time. The killings of Kashmiri Hindus, including many prominent ones, instilled more fear.

In order to undermine his political rival Farooq Abdullah who at that time was the Chief minister of Jammu and Kashmir, the Indian home minister Mufti Mohammad Sayeed convinced prime minister V.P. Singh to appoint Jagmohan as the governor of the state. Abdullah resented Jagmohan who had been appointed as the governor earlier in April 1984 as well and had recommended Abdullah's dismissal to Rajiv Gandhi in July 1984. Abdullah had earlier declared that he would resign if Jagmohan was made the Governor. However, the Central government went ahead and appointed him as Governor. In response, Abdullah resigned on 18 January 1990, and Jagmohan suggested the dissolution of the State Assembly.

Most of the Kashmiri Hindus left Kashmir valley and moved to other parts of India, particularly to the refugee camps in Jammu region of the state.

=== Attack and threats ===
On 14 September 1989, Tika Lal Taploo, who was a lawyer and a BJP member, was murdered by the JKLF in his home in Srinagar.

On 4 November, a judge Neelkanth Ganjoo, was shot dead near the Srinagar High court. He had sentenced Kashmiri separatist Maqbool Bhat to death in 1968.

In December, members of JKLF kidnapped Dr. Rubaiya Sayeed, daughter of the-then Union Minister Mufti Mohammad Sayeed, demanding release of five militants, which was subsequently fulfilled.

On 4 January 1990, Srinagar-based newspaper Aftab released a message, threatening all Hindus to leave Kashmir immediately, sourcing it to the militant organization Hizbul Mujahideen. On 14 April 1990, another Srinagar based newspaper Al-safa republished the same warning. The newspaper did not claim ownership of the statement and subsequently issued a clarification. Walls were pasted with posters with threatening messages to all Kashmiris to strictly follow Islamic rules which included abidance by the Islamic dress code, a prohibition on alcohol, cinemas, and video parlors and strict restrictions on women. Unknown masked men with Kalashnikovs forced people to reset their time to Pakistan Standard Time. Offices buildings, shops, and establishments were colored green as a sign of Islamic rule. Shops, factories, temples and homes of Kashmiri Hindus were burned or destroyed. Threatening posters were posted on doors of Hindus asking them to leave Kashmir immediately. During the middle of the night of 18 and 19 January, a blackout took place in the Kashmir Valley where electricity was cut except in mosques which broadcast divisive and inflammatory messages, asking for a purge of Kashmiri Hindus.

On 21 January, two days after Jagmohan took over as governor, the Gawkadal massacre took place in Srinagar, in which the Indian security forces had opened fire on protesters, leading to the death of at least 50 people, and likely over 100. These events led to chaos. Lawlessness took over the valley and the crowd with slogans and guns started roaming around the streets. News of violent incidents kept coming and many of the Hindus who survived the night saved their lives by traveling out of the valley.

On 25 January, the Rawalpora shooting incident took place, wherein four Indian Air Force personnel, Squadron Leader Ravi Khanna, Corporal D.B. Singh, Corporal Uday Shankar and Airman Azad Ahmad were killed and 10 other IAF personal were injured, while they were waiting at Rawalpora bus stand for their vehicle to pick them up in the morning. Altogether around 40 rounds were fired by the terrorists, apparently from 2 to 3 automatic weapons and one semi-automatic pistol. The Jammu and Kashmir Armed Police post located nearby, with 7 armed constables and one head constable, did not react. Jammu Kashmir Liberation Front (JKLF), with its leader Yasin Malik in particular, were allegedly involved in the killings. Incidents like these further expedited the exodus of Hindus from Kashmir. Several intelligence operatives were assassinated, over the course of January.

On 2 February, Satish Tikoo, a young Hindu social worker was murdered near his own house in Habba Kadal, Srinagar.

On 13 February, Lassa Kaul, Station Director of Srinagar Doordarshan, was shot dead.

On 29 April, Sarwanand Koul Premi, a veteran Kashmiri poet and his son were shot and hanged.

On 4 June, Girija Tickoo, a Kashmiri Hindu teacher was gang raped by terrorists, who ripped her abdomen and chopped her body into two pieces with a saw machine while she was still alive.

Many Kashmiri Pandit women were kidnapped, raped and murdered, throughout the time of exodus. The local organisation of Hindus in Kashmir, Kashmiri Pandit Sangharsh Samiti (KPSS), after carrying out a survey in 2008 and 2009, estimated 357 Hindus were killed in Kashmir in 1990.

== Aftermath ==
Militancy in Kashmir increased after the exodus, and militants targeted properties of Kashmiri Hindus. The Jammu and Kashmir government stated that 219 members of the Hindu Pandit community had been killed between 1989 and 2004 and none thereafter. The local organisation of Hindus in Kashmir, Kashmir Pandit Sangharsh Samiti (KPSS) after carrying out a survey in 2008 and 2009, said that 399 Kashmiri Hindus were killed by insurgents from 1990 to 2011 with 75% of them being killed during the first year of the Kashmiri insurgency, and that during the last 20 years, about 650 Hindus have been killed in the valley.

In response to the exodus, an organisation Panun Kashmir, a political group representing the Hindus who fled Kashmir, was formed. In late 1991, the organisation adopted the Margdarshan Resolution, which stated the need for a separate Union Territory in Kashmir division, Panun Kashmir. Panun Kashmir would serve as a homeland for Kashmiri Hindus and would resettle the displaced Kashmiri Pandits.

In 2009 Oregon Legislative Assembly passed a resolution to recognise 14 September 2007, as Martyrs Day to acknowledge ethnic cleansing and campaigns of terror inflicted on non-Muslim minorities of Jammu and Kashmir by militants seeking to establish an Islamic state.

Kashmiri Hindus continue to fight for their return to the valley and many of them live as refugees. The exiled community had hoped to return after the situation improved. Most have not done so because the situation in the Valley remains unstable and they fear a risk to their lives. Most of them lost their properties after the exodus and many are unable to go back and sell them. Their status as displaced people has adversely harmed them in the realm of education. Many Hindu families could not afford to send their children to well regarded public schools. Furthermore, many Hindus faced institutional discrimination by predominantly Muslim state bureaucrats. As a result of the inadequate ad hoc schools and colleges formed in the refugee camps, it became harder for Hindu children to access education. They suffered in higher education as well, as they could not claim admission in PG colleges of Jammu university, while getting admitted in the institutes of Kashmir valley was out of question.

An organisation called Roots of Kashmir filed a petition in 2017 to reopen 215 cases of more than 700 alleged murders of Kashmiri Hindus, however the Supreme Court of India refused its plea. They have also demanded the creation of a "special crimes tribunal" to look into the ethnic cleansing and crimes committed. They also demanded a one time compensation for displaced Kashmiri Hindus who are not able to apply for government jobs.

=== Post-exodus intimidation and violence ===
Human rights organisation Asia Watch documented that militant groups continued threatening Hindus in Kashmir even after most of them had left the valley. Militant groups such as the Hizbul Mujahideen (HM), Harkat-ul-Ansar and Al Jehad played a crucial role in preventing the return of the Pandits to Kashmir; HM chief Syed Salahuddin warned displaced Pandits against returning in July 1990, and when militant group Ikhwan-ul-Muslimin appealed to the Hindus to return to Kashmir in 1992, two other militant groups Al Jehad and Al Umar promptly issued press releases warning the Hindus against returning.

A number of Kashmiri Pandits who had stayed back in the villages of Kashmir were killed in several massacres by militants in the late 1990s and early 2000s, (Note: Instances of massacres of Hindu civilians by militants became frequent across Jammu and Kashmir in the late 1990s and early 2000s, with an increased role of Pakistan-based fanatic militant groups in the insurgency.) further deteriorating the community's sense of security, and ending hopes of an early return of displaced Kashmiri Hindus. These massacres followed several state government proposals and schemes to rehabilitate and resettle displaced Kashmiri Pandits back in Kashmir, effectively halting their implementation. After the newly elected state government announced an intent to facilitate the return of displaced Kashmiri Pandits, militants killed seven Pandits in March 1997 in the village of Sangrampora, and shot dead three Kashmiri Hindu schoolteachers in June 1997 after segregating them from Muslims in a local bus in Gool. These massacres caused further displacement of Hindus from these areas. In January 1998, militants massacred 23 Hindus in the village of Wandhama, and set fire to the village temple and a house, after the state government announced a scheme to resettle displaced Kashmiri Pandits in Kashmir. This massacre was widely discussed among displaced Kashmiri Hindus and discouraged them from returning. In March 2003, 24 Pandits were massacred in the village of Nadimarg by Lashkar-e-Taiba militants, following a state government proposal to rehabilitate displaced Kashmiri Pandits, which could not be implemented due to the massacre.

During the 2016 Kashmir unrest, transit camps housing Kashmir Hindus in Kashmir were attacked by mobs and posters threatening Hindus to leave Kashmir or be killed were put up near such camps in Pulwama by a militant group. Over 1300 Kashmiri Hindu government employees fled the region during the unrest. Since 2019, as the government began rehabilitating some displaced Hindus in Kashmir following the revocation of the state's special status, several Kashmiri Hindus and other Hindu civilians living in Kashmir have been killed in targeted killings by new hybrid factions of longstanding Pakistan-based jihadist militant groups. These targeted killings renewed a climate of fear for the Kashmiri Hindus who had hesitantly returned to Kashmir under government schemes, with militants pursuing to intimidate and expel them.

== Rehabilitation ==
The Indian Government has tried to rehabilitate the Hindus and the separatists have also invited the Hindus back to Kashmir.

As of 2016, a total of 1,800 Kashmiri Hindu youths have returned to the Valley since the announcing of Rs. 1,168-crore package in 2008 by the UPA government. However, R.K. Bhat, president of Youth All India Kashmiri Samaj criticised the package to be a mere eyewash and claimed that most of the youths were living in cramped prefabricated sheds or in rented accommodation. He also said that 4,000 posts have been lying vacant since 2010 and alleged that the BJP government was repeating the same rhetoric and was not serious about helping them. The apathy on the part of the government and the sufferings of the Kashmiri Hindus have been highlighted in a play titled 'Kaash Kashmir'. Such efforts or claims have lacked political will as journalist Rahul Pandita writes in a memoir.

In an interview with NDTV on 19 January, Farooq Abdullah created controversy when he stated that the onus was on Kashmiri Hindus to come back themselves and nobody would beg them to do so. His comments were met with disagreement and criticism by Kashmiri Hindu authors Neeru Kaul, Siddhartha Gigoo, Congress MP Shashi Tharoor and Lt. General Syed Ata Hasnain (retd.). He also said that during his tenure as Chief Minister in 1996, he had asked them to return but they refused to do so. He reiterated his comments on 23 January and said that the time had come for them to return.

The issue of separate townships for Kashmiri Hindus has been a source of contention in the Kashmir valley, with Islamists, separatists, as well as mainstream political parties, all opposing it. Hizbul Mujahideen militant, Burhan Muzaffar Wani, had threatened of attacking the "Hindu composite townships" which were meant to be built for the rehabilitation of the non-Muslim community. In a 6-minute long video clip, Wani described the rehabilitation scheme as resembling Israeli designs. Kashmiri Hindus residing in the Valley also mourned Burhan Wani's death. Burhan Wani's self-styled successor in the Hizbul Mujahideen, Zakir Rashid Bhat, also asked the Kashmiri Hindus to return and ensured them protection.

In 2010, the Government of Jammu and Kashmir noted that 808 Hindus families, comprising 3,445 people, were still living in the Valley and that financial and other incentives put in place to encourage others to return there had been unsuccessful. The employment package was also extended to Hindus who did not migrate out of the valley with an amendment to J&K Migrants (Special Drive) Recruitment Rules, 2009 in October 2017. The Indian Government has taken up the issue of education of the displaced students from Kashmir, and helped them get admissions in various Kendriya Vidyalayas and major educational institutions & universities across the country.

Some consider the now-abrogated Article 370 as a roadblock in the resettlement of Kashmiri Hindus as the Constitution of Jammu and Kashmir does not allow those living in India outside Jammu and Kashmir to freely settle in the state and become its citizens.

== In popular culture ==
=== Books ===
- Katha Satisar, 2001 Hindi novel by Chandrakanta (translated into English in 2018 as The Saga of Satisar by Ranjana Kaul)
- The Tiger Ladies: A Memoir of Kashmir, 2002 English memoir by Sudha Koul
- The Garden of Solitude, 2011 English semi-autobiographical novel by Siddhartha Gigoo
- Our Moon Has Blood Clots, 2013 English memoir by Indian journalist Rahul Pandita is based on the firsthand account of the exodus.
- A Long Dream of Home – The persecution, exile and exodus of Kashmiri Pandits, 2015 English anthology, edited by Siddhartha Gigoo and Varad Sharma.

=== Movies ===
- Bub, 2001 Kashmiri film directed by Jyoti Sarup
- Sheen, 2004 Hindi film directed by Ashok Pandit
- I Am, 2010 anthology film directed by Onir
- Shikara, 2020 Hindi film directed by Vidhu Vinod Chopra
- The Kashmir Files, 2022 Hindi film directed by Vivek Agnihotri
- Baramulla, 2025 Hindi film directed by Aditya Suhas Jambhale
- Batt Koch, 2025 Kashmiri film directed by Siddharth Koul and Ankit Wali

== See also ==
- Partition of India
- Panun Kashmir
- Insurgency in Jammu and Kashmir
- Jammu Kashmir Liberation Front

== Bibliography ==
Secondary sources

- Bose, Sumantra (1997), The Challenge in Kashmir: Democracy, self-determination, and a just peace, New Delhi: Sage Publications, ISBN 978-0-8039-9350-1
- Bose, Sumantra (2003), Kashmir: Roots of Conflict, Paths to Peace, Harvard University Press, ISBN 978-0-674-01173-1
- Bose, Sumantra (16 September 2013). Transforming India: Challenges to the World's Largest Democracy. Harvard University Press. ISBN 978-0-674-72820-2.
- Datta, Ankur (2023). "The Blank Space Between Nationalisms: Locating the Kashmiri Pandits in Liberal and Hindu Nationalist Politics in Relation to Kashmir and India". In Duschinski, Haley; Bhan, Mona; Robinson, Cabieiri deBergh (eds.). The Palgrave Handbook of New Directions in Kashmir Studies. pp. 365–380. ISBN 9783031285202.
- Datta, Ankur (2017). On Uncertain Ground: Displaced Kashmiri Pandits in Jammu and Kashmir. Oxford University Press. ISBN 978-0-19-908737-2.
- Evans, Alexander (2002). "A departure from history: Kashmiri Pandits, 1990–2001". Contemporary South Asia. 11 (1): 19–37. doi:10.1080/0958493022000000341. ISSN 0958-4935. S2CID 145573161.
- Faheem, Farrukh (2018), "Interrogating the Ordinary: Everyday Politics and the Struggle for Azadi in Kashmir", in Haley Duschinski; Mona Bhan; Ather Zia; Cynthia Mahmood (eds.), Resisting Occupation in Kashmir, University of Pennsylvania Press, pp. 230–247, ISBN 978-0-8122-9496-5
- Hussain, Shahla (2015), "Kashmiri Visions of Freedom: The Past and the Present", in Chitralekha Zutshi (ed.), Kashmir: History, Politics, Representation, Cambridge University Press, ISBN 978-1107181977
- Madan, T. N. (2008), "Kashmir, Kashmiris, Kashmiriyat: An Introductory Essay", in Rao, Aparna (ed.), The Valley of Kashmir: The Making and Unmaking of a Composite Culture?, pp. 1–36
- Metcalf, Barbara; Metcalf, Thomas R. (2006), A Concise History of Modern India (Cambridge Concise Histories), Cambridge and New York: Cambridge University Press. Pp. xxxiii, 372, ISBN 978-0-521-68225-1
- Osuri, Goldie (2026). Settler/colonialism in Kashmir: Sovereignty, catastrophe, and indigeneity. Manchester University Press. ISBN 9781526196064.
- Rai, Mridu (2004), Hindu Rulers, Muslim Subjects: Islam, Rights, and the History of Kashmir, Princeton University Press/Permanent Black. Pp. xii, 335., ISBN 978-81-7824-202-6
- Sawhney, Charu (2019). "Internally Displaced Kashmiri Pandits: Negotiation and Access to Cultural Capital". South Asia: Journal of South Asian Studies. 42 (6): 1062–1077. doi:10.1080/00856401.2019.1670412.
- Swami, Praveen (2007), India, Pakistan and the Secret Jihad: The Covert War in Kashmir, 1947–2004, Routledge, ISBN 978-1-134-13752-7
- Zutshi, Chitralekha (2003), Languages of Belonging: Islam, Regional Identity, and the Making of Kashmir, C. Hurst & Co. Publishers, ISBN 978-1-85065-700-2
- Zutshi, Chitralekha (2019). Kashmir. Oxford India Short Introduction Series. Oxford University Press. ISBN 978-0-19-012141-9.

Primary sources

- Gigoo, Siddhartha; Sharma, Varad, eds. (2016). A Long Dream of Home: The persecution, exile and exodus of Kashmiri Pandits. Bloomsbury Publishing. ISBN 9789386250254.
- Tikoo, Colonel Tej K (2013). Kashmir: Its Aborigines and Their Exodus. Lancer Publishers LLC. ISBN 978-1-935501-58-9.
