= Akura, Jammu and Kashmir =

Village in Jammu and Kashmir, India

Coordinates: 24°41′N 87°56′E

Akura is a village in Anantnag sub district in Anantnag district in the Indian state of Jammu and Kashmir. It is located on the bank of river lidder in Anantnag district India union territory of Jammu and Kashmir. There is a power receiving station, Anmt (nursing college) EIDGAH located on the banks of lidder. High schools of the district include Anantnag M.I.E (Model Institute of Education) Akura

== Demographics ==
According to the 2011 Census of India, the village has a population of 3,048; 1,493 are male and 1,555 female.
