= Maharaja Agrasen College (disambiguation) =

Maharaja Agrasen College may refer to these colleges in India named after the legendary Indian king (maharaja) Agrasen:

- Maharaja Agrasen College, a college situated in East Delhi
- Maharaja Agrasen College of Engineering and Technology, Uttar Pradesh, India
- Maharaja Agrasen Medical College, Agroha a medical college in Agroha, Haryana, India

== See also ==
- Maharaja Agrasen Hospital (disambiguation)
