= Baidaulagarh =

Village in Uttar Pradesh, India

Coordinates: 27°11′N 82°39′E

Baidaulagarh is a village in Domariaganj, Uttar Pradesh, India. It is largely populated by the Agrahari.
