= Agrasen Jayanti =

Birth anniversary celebration of Maharaja Agrasen

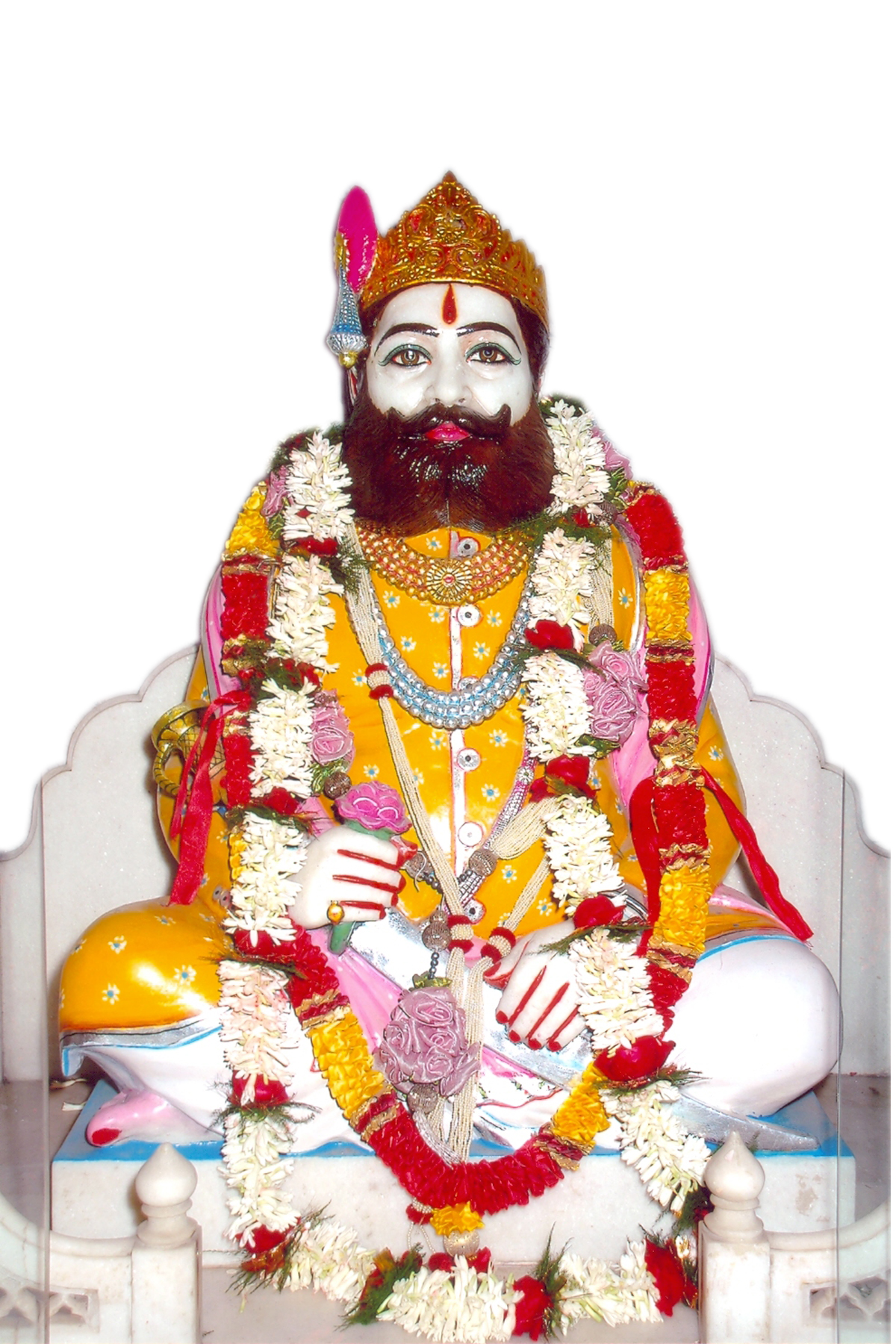
- Idol of Maharaja Agrasen
- Also called: Translation: Birth Anniversary of Agrasen; Agarsain Jayanti, Agrasen Maharaj Jayanti
- Observed by: Hindu, Jain, Agrahari, Agrawal
- Type: Indian, Religious (Government holiday in Uttar Pradesh, Rajasthan, Punjab and Haryana)
- Significance: Birth Anniversary of Agrasen
- Date: First day of Navaratri
- Frequency: Annual

Agrasen Jayanti (literally "Agrasen's birthday") is the birth anniversary celebration of a legendary Hindu king Agrasen Maharaj. He was king of Agroha, and it was from him that the Agrawal caste originated. Agrasen Jayanti is observed on the fourth day of Ashwin month of Hindu calendar.

The Government of India issued a postage stamp in honor of Maharaja Agresen in 1976 on occasion of his 5100th Jayanti.

== Public holiday ==
The UP state Government has officially declared holiday on the occasion of Agrasen Jayanti in Uttar Pradesh. In North Indian state of Haryana, there is also a public holiday on Agrasen Jayanti. This day is a gazetted holiday in the state of Punjab and Haryana.

== Celebration ==
Maharaja Agrasen has taught us the lesson of unity and to help each other in the society.”

— Hamid Ansari, Vice President of India said on the occasion of Agrasen Jayanti in September, 2008

Devotees make special preparations to make Maharaja Agrasen Jayanti special. The birth anniversary of divine leader Maharaja Agrasen with colorful procession and various cultural programmes which is conducted throughout the day at different places of the India. The Jayanti is celebrated by the Vaishya community with full religious devotion. Agrasena jayanti is celebrated in across India among Agrahari, Agrawal, Barnwal and Jain. On this day, descendants of Agrasena busy themselves in social welfare activities. Free medical camps, food distribution and several cultural functions and program are taken up to spread the message of equality and brotherhood. They honor Agrasen for his ideals in life and try to follow his footsteps.

== See also ==
- Hemu, Samrat Hem Chandra Vikramaditya the last Hindu ruler of Delhi
- Hemu's Samadhi Sthal, encroached by Muslims
- History of Haryana
- Vedic era
