= Ilai Vaniyar =

Tamil-speaking caste from Tamil Nadu

Ilia Vaniyar
- Religions: Hinduism, Christianity
- Languages: Tamil
- Region: Indian state of Tamil Nadu
- Related groups: Vaniyar traders

Ilia Vaniyar is a Tamil-speaking caste mainly from south Tamil Nadu. Other names they are referred are Senaiyar, Senaithalaivar, Moopanar(In Tirunelveli District) Mudaliar, Pillai. They belong to the Vaishya varna.

== Distribution ==
Ilia Vaniyar are mainly populated in Tirunelveli District, Tiruvarur District, Chennai, Kanyakumari District, Nagapattinam District, Thanjaur District and Madurai District, including places like Tenmalai, Kayatharu and Seevalapperi.

== Society and caste organisation ==
They are included in the Tamil Nadu state's list of Backward castes.
