= Maharaja Agrasen Hospital =

Maharaja Agrasen Hospital may refer to these hospitals in India named after the legendary Indian king (maharaja) Agrasen:

- Maharaja Agrasen Hospital (Bangalore)
- Maharaja Agrasen Hospital (New Delhi)

== See also ==
- Maharaja Agrasen College (disambiguation)
