= History of Delhi =

Historical Region of North India; Delhi
Language	Hindustani (Hindi and Urdu), Punjabi, Bengali, English
Battles	Battle of Delhi (1303); Mongols vs Khiljis; Sack of Delhi (1398); Timurids vs Tughlaqs; Battle of Delhi (1556); Hemu vs Mughals; Battle of Delhi (1737); Marathas vs Mughals; Sack of Delhi (1757);Mughals vs Durrani Empire; Battle of Delhi (1757); Marathas vs Mughals; Capture of Delhi (1760) Marathas vs Durrani Empire; Battle of Delhi (1764); Marathas vs Mughals; Battle of Delhi (1771); Marathas vs Mughals; Battle of Delhi (1783); Sikhs vs Mughals Capture of Delhi (1788); Marathas vs Rohilla-Mughal Alliance Battle of Delhi (1793); Marathas vs Sikhs; Battle of Delhi (1803); British East India Company vs Marathas; Battle of Delhi (1804); British East India Company vs Marathas; Battle of Delhi (1857); British East India Company vs Mughals
Dynasties	Kuru kingdom (c. 1200 BCE – c. 500 BCE); Tomars (736–1179); Chauhan (1180–1192); Ghurids (1193–1206); Mamluks (1206–89); Khaljis (1290–1320); Tughlaqs (1320–1413); Sayyids (1414–51); Lodis (1451–1526); Mughals (1526–1540); Suris (1540–55); Hemchandra (1556); Mughals (1556–1764); Jats (1764–1770); Mughals (1770–1771); Marathas (1757–1803); British (1803–1947); Government of India (1947–present)

Delhi has been an important political centre of India as the capital of several empires. The recorded history of Delhi begins with the 8th century Tomar Rajput dynasty. It is considered to be a city built, destroyed and rebuilt several times, as outsiders who successfully invaded the Indian subcontinent would ransack the existing capital city in Delhi, and those who came to conquer and stay would be so impressed by the city's strategic location as to make it their capital and rebuild it in their own way.

In the medieval era, Delhi was ruled by the Tomara dynasty and Chauhan from 736 to 1193. The Delhi Sultanate is the name given for a series of five successive dynasties, which remained as a dominant power of Indian subcontinent with Delhi as their capital...

During the sultanate period, the city became a center for culture. The Delhi Sultanate came to an end in 1526, when Babur defeated the forces of the last Lodi sultan, Ibrahim Lodi at the First Battle of Panipat, and formed the Mughal Empire.

19th-Century Delhi painting of the Qutb Minar

The Mughals ruled the area for more than two centuries. During the 16th century, the city declined as the Mughal capital was shifted. The fifth Mughal Emperor Shah Jahan built the walled city of Shahjahanabad within Delhi, and its landmarks, the Red Fort, Jama Masjid, and Lal Mandir. His reign would be considered the zenith of the empire. After the death of his successor Aurangzeb, the Mughal Empire was plagued by a series of revolts. They lost major portions to the Marathas, Sikhs and many governors of erstwhile Mughal provinces like Bengal, Awadh and Hyderabad. Delhi was sacked and looted by Nader Shah. The Rajputs captured many important towns of Mughal heartland south of Delhi. The Marathas captured Delhi in the Battle of Delhi in 1757 and continued to control it until 1803 when they were defeated by the British during the Second Anglo-Maratha War. In 1803, Delhi was captured by the British East India Company.

During Company Rule in India, the Mughal Emperor Bahadur Shah II was reduced to merely a figurehead. The Indian Rebellion of 1857 sought to end company rule and declared Bahadur Shah II the Emperor of Hindustan. However, the British soon recaptured Delhi and their other territories, ending the short-lived rebellion. This also marked the beginning of direct British Rule in India. In 1911, the capital of British India was shifted from Calcutta to New Delhi, the last inner city of Delhi designed by Edwin Lutyens.

After India's independence from the British, New Delhi became the capital of the newly formed Republic of India.

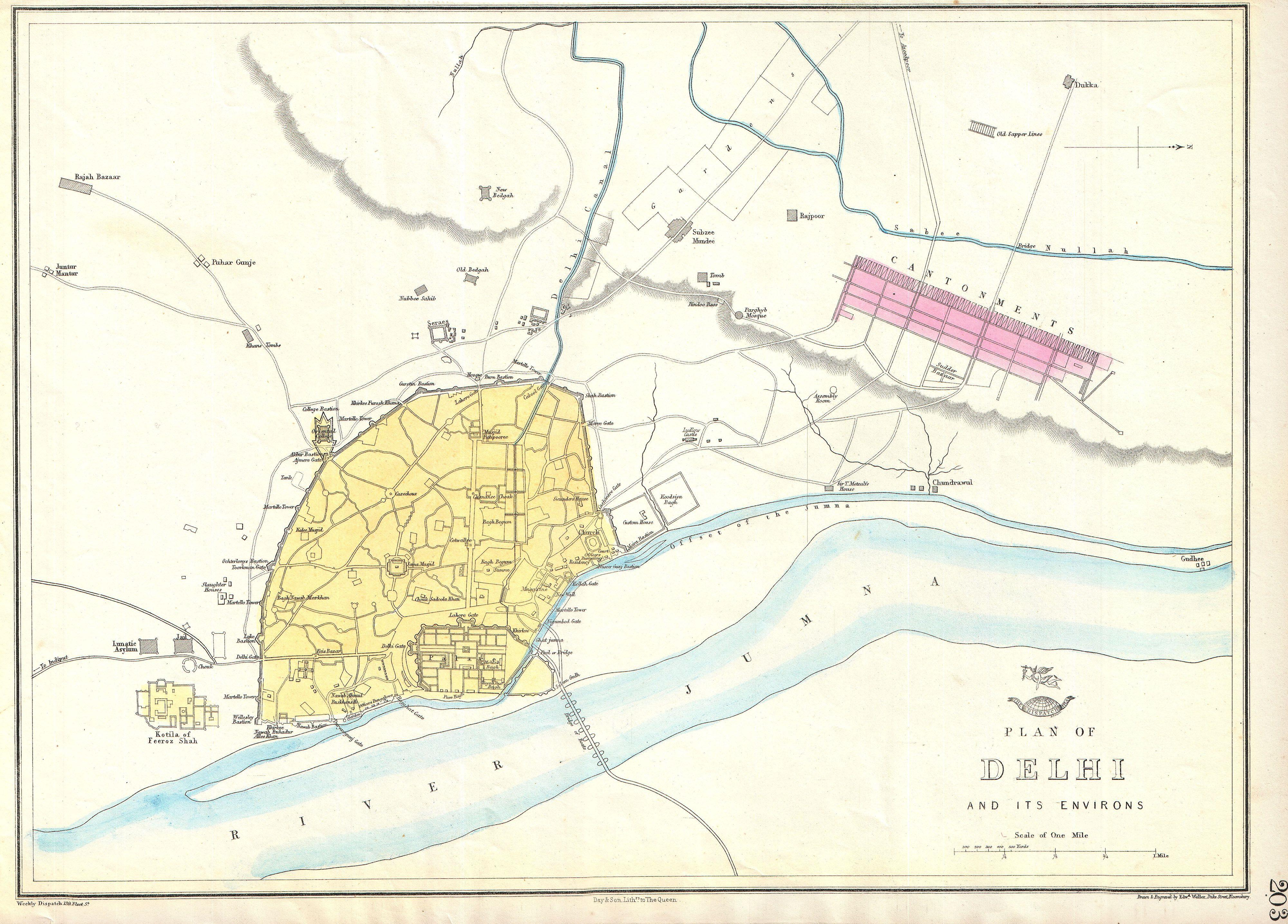
Historic map of Shahjahanabad (now known as Old Delhi), in 1863

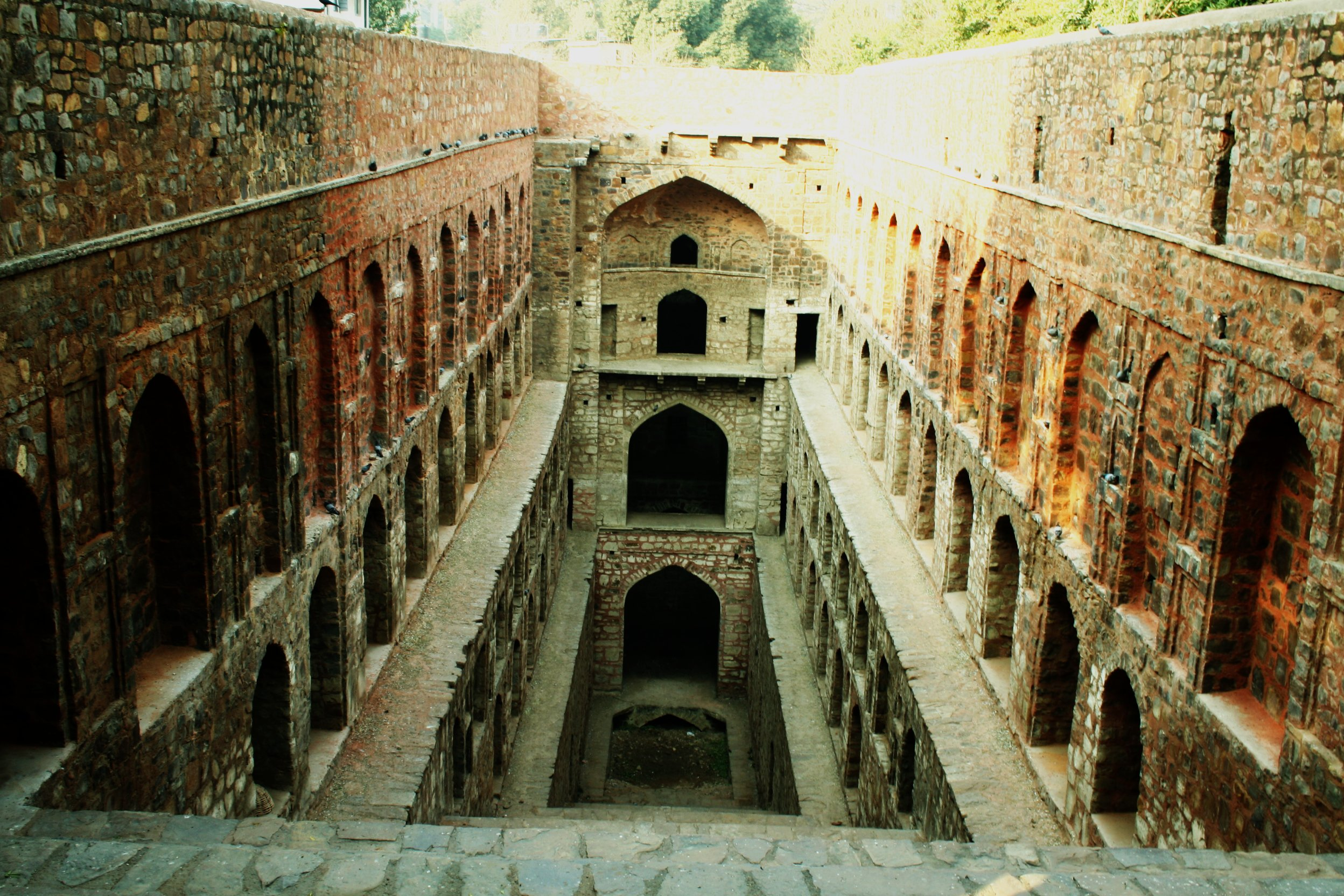
Agrasen ki Baoli is believed to be originally built by the legendary king Agrasen.

== Pre-historic period ==
There was the Ochre Coloured Pottery culture in the Red fort area, which began around c. 2000 BCE according to carbon dating. Around c. 1200 BCE, the region was inhabited by people of the Painted Grey Ware culture which corresponds to the Vedic period. Significant prehistoric sites in Delhi include Anangpur (in the Badarpur region), as well as Harappan excavations near Narela and Nand Nagari.

== In mythology ==
A long-standing tradition associates Delhi with Indraprastha and identifies the legendary city with the village Indarpat, which survived until the early 20th century within the Purana Qila. There is no tangible archeological evidence, however, which links the excavated 'painted greyware' at Purana Qila with the Bharata Khanda site. The legendary ancient city of Indraprastha is mentioned in the ancient Indian epic Mahabharata probably compiled between the 3rd century BCE and the 3rd century CE, with the oldest preserved parts not much older than around 400 BCE. During the Mauryan period, Indraprastha was known as Indapatta in Buddhist literature. The location of Indraprastha is uncertain but Purana Qila in present-day New Delhi is frequently cited. (Note: For instance, Indologist J. A. B. van Buitenen, who translated the Mahabharata, wrote in 1973 that "there can be no reasonable doubt about the locations of Hastinapura, of Indraprastha (Delhi's Purana Qila [...]), and of Mathura)

== Medieval period ==
=== Tomara ===
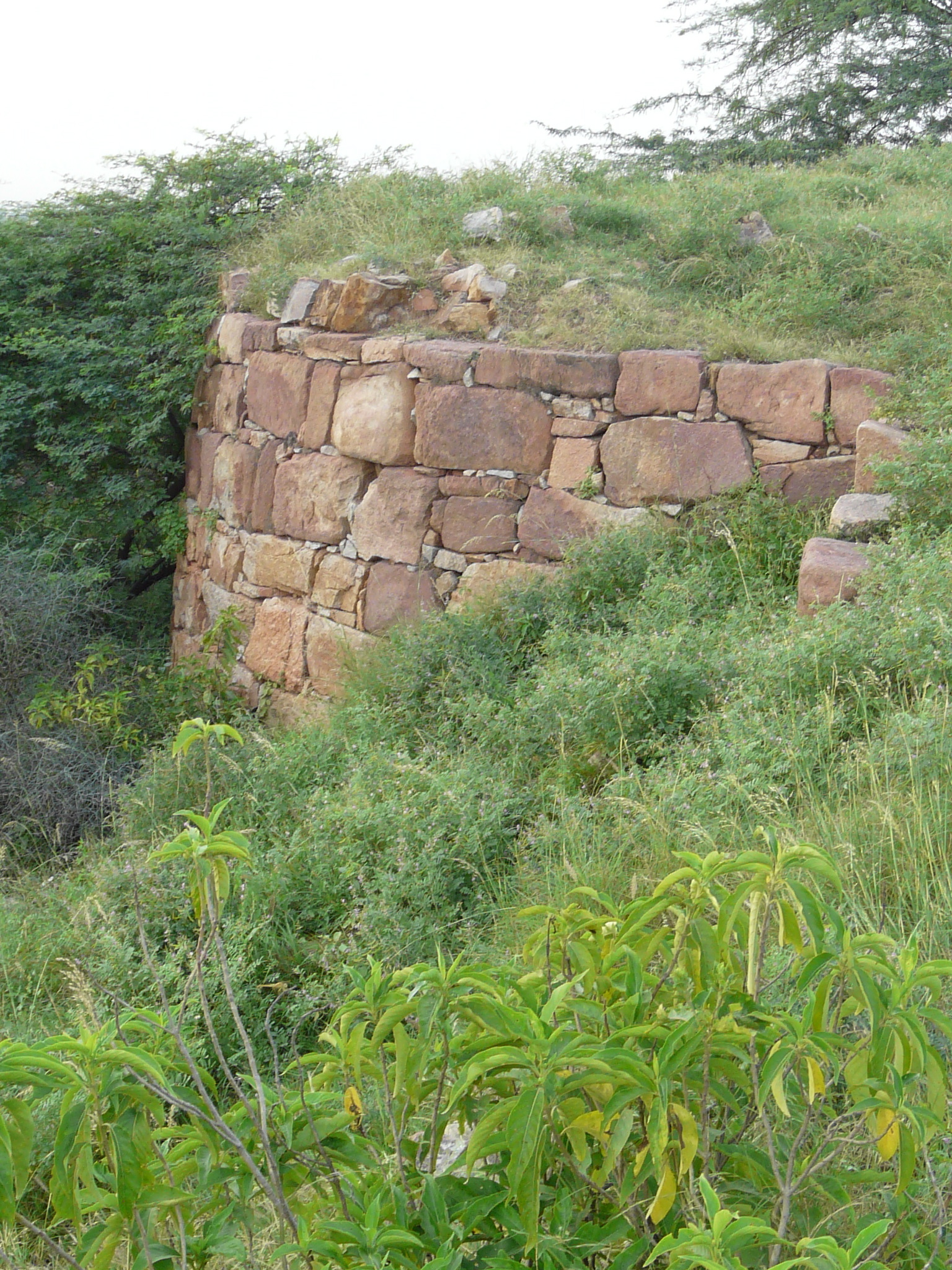
The bastion of Lal Kot fort in Delhi's Mehrauli built by Tomara Rajput ruler, Anangpal Tomar in c. 1052 CE.

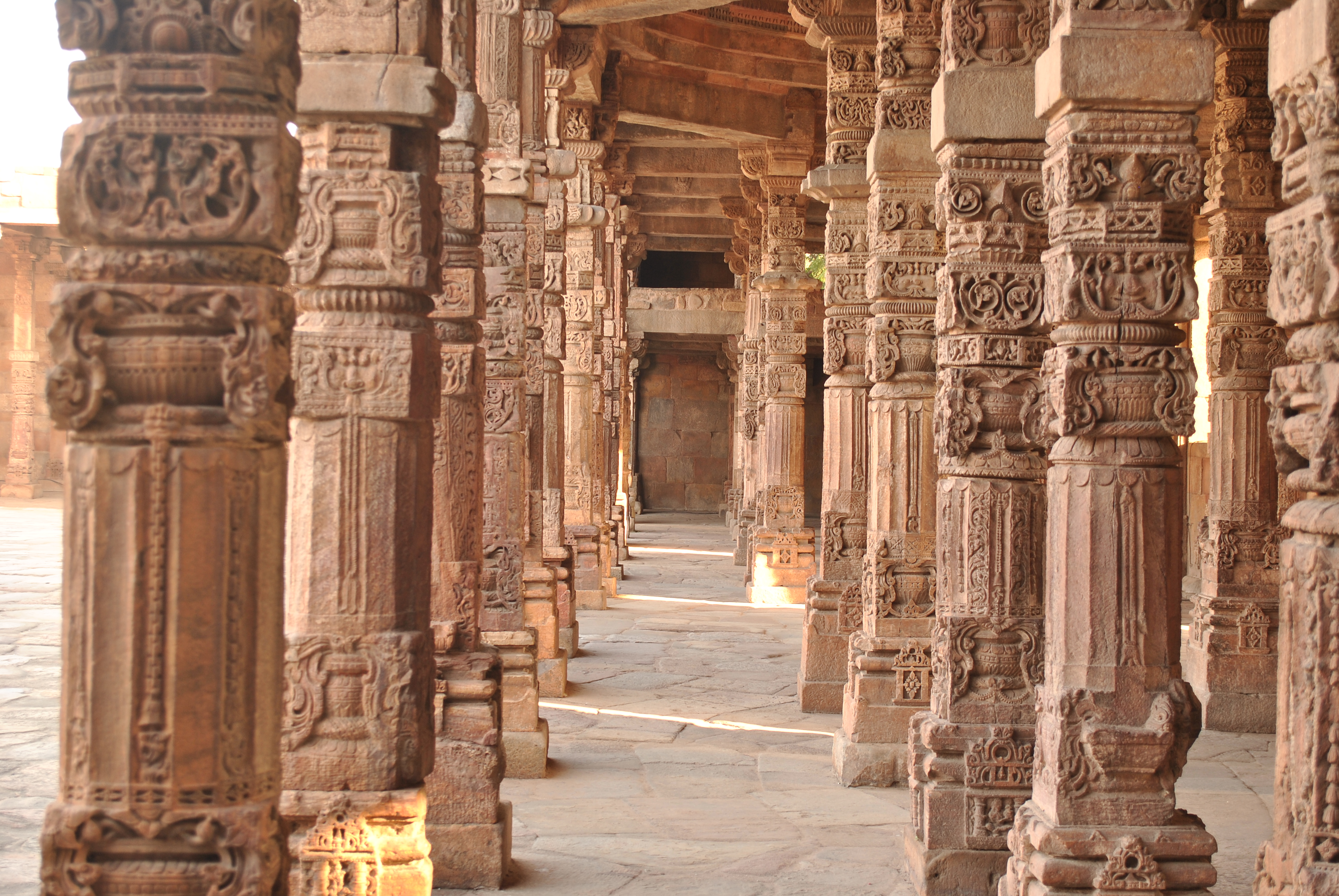
Sculptures of ancient temple in Qutb Minar complex.

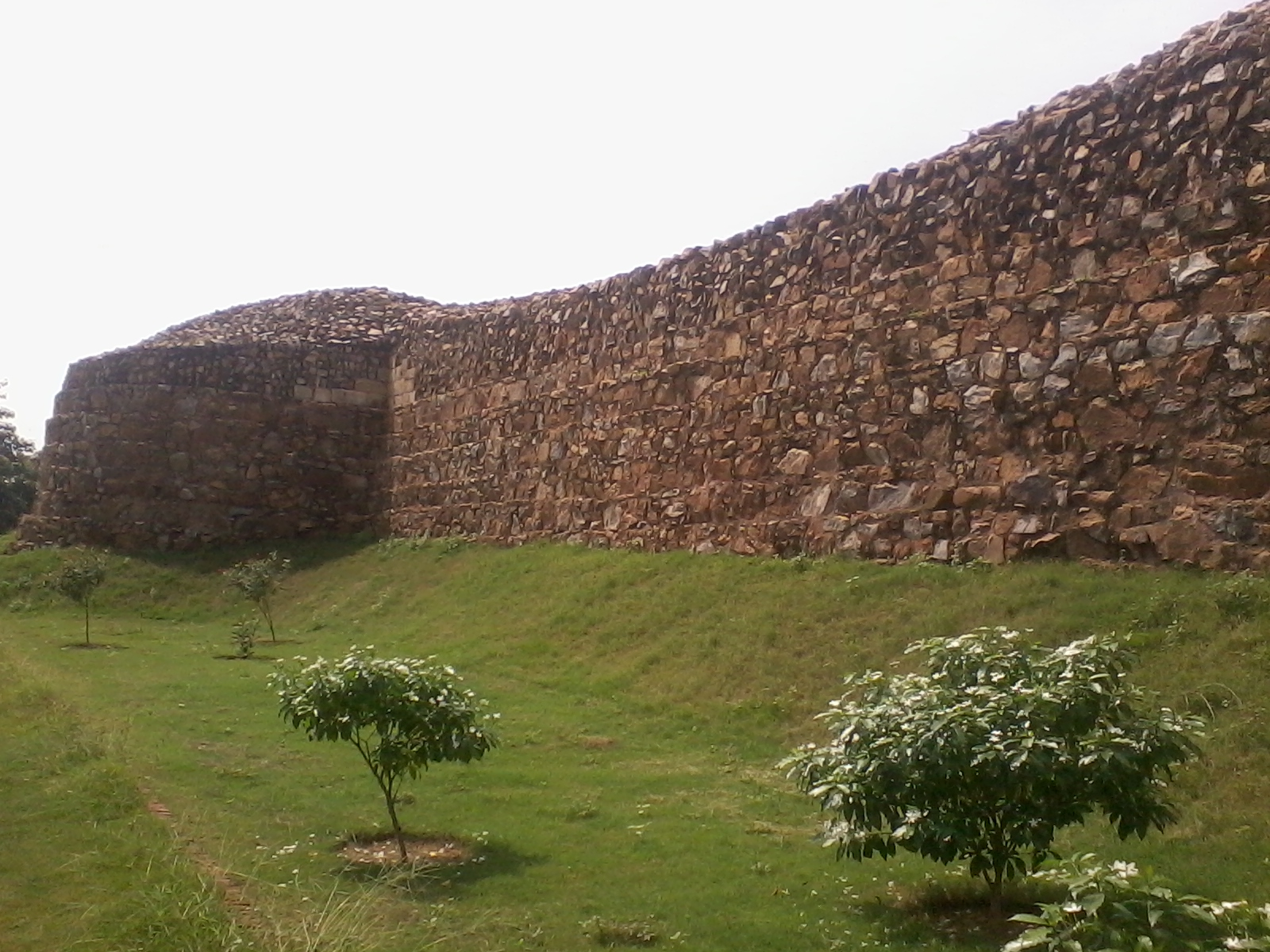
Lal Kot, built by Anangpal Tomar II

Anangpal Tomar founded Delhi in 1052. A VS 1383 inscription in Delhi Museum confirms the founding of Delhi by the Tomars.

He established the Tomar Dynasty of Delhi in the early 8th century and built his capital at the Anangpur village in Haryana. The Anangpur Dam was built during his reign; the Surajkund during the reign of his son Surajpal.

=== Chauhan Rajputs ===
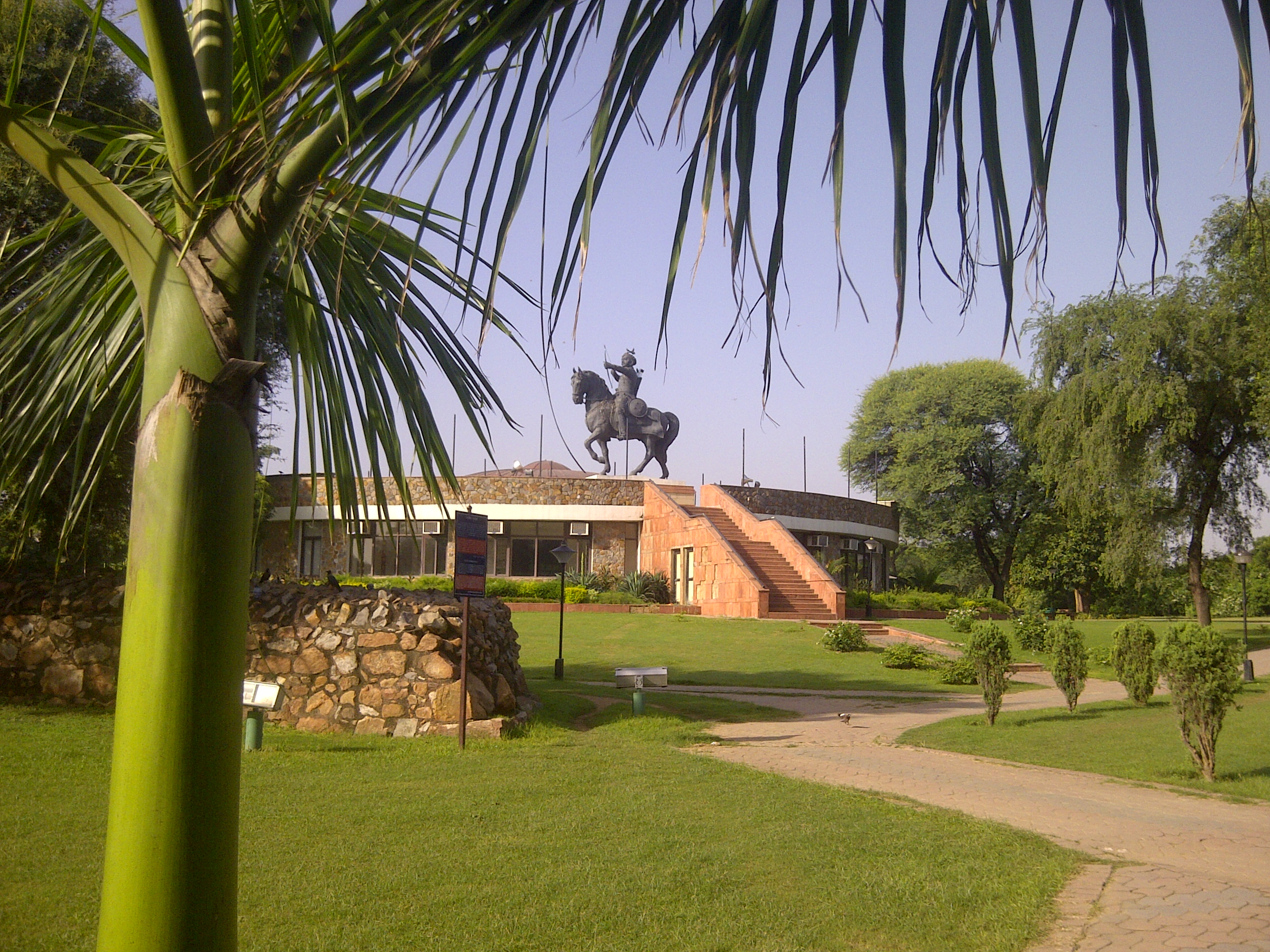
Museum and remnants of the walls of Qila Rai Pithora, the second city of Delhi.

The Rajput Chahamana (Chauhan) kings of Ajmer conquered Lal Kot in 1180 and renamed it Qila Rai Pithora. The Chauhan king Prithviraj III was defeated in 1192 by Muhammad Ghori in the Second Battle of Tarain, solidifying Muslim presence in northern India and shattering Rajput power in the Indo-Gangetic Plain.

== Late Medieval period (13th–16th centuries CE) ==
=== Delhi Sultanate ===
From 1206, Delhi became the capital of the Delhi Sultanate under the Mamluk dynasty. The first Sultan of Delhi, Qutb-ud-din Aybak, was a former slave who rose through the ranks to become a general, a governor and then Sultan of Delhi. Qutb-ud-din started the construction of the Qutub Minar, a recognisable symbol of Delhi, to commemorate his victory but died before its completion. In the Qutb complex he also constructed the Quwwat-al-Islam (might of Islam), which is the earliest extant mosque in India. He was said to have destroyed twenty-seven Jain temples initially housed in the Qutb complex and pillaged exquisitely carved pillars and building material from their debris for this mosque, many of which can still be seen. After the end of the Mamluk dynasty, a succession of Turkic Central Asian and Afghan dynasties, the Khalji dynasty, the Tughluq dynasty, the Sayyid dynasty and the Lodi dynasty held power in the late medieval period and built a sequence of forts and townships in Delhi.

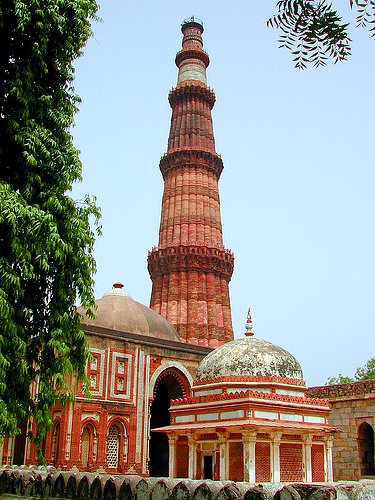
The Qutub Minar is the world's tallest brick minaret at 72.5 metres, built by Qutb-ud-din Aibak of the Slave dynasty in 1192 CE.

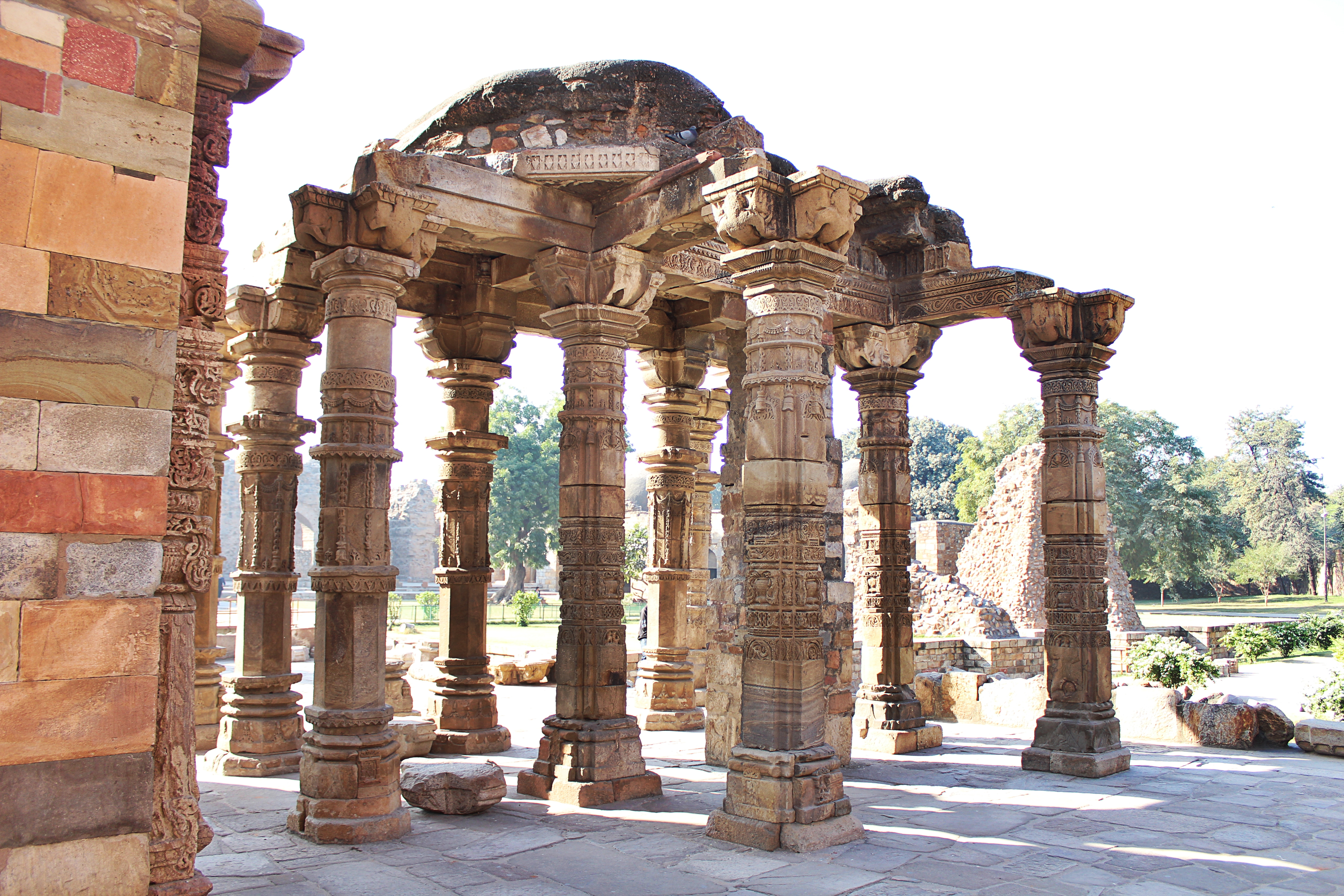
Mosque tomb over ancient temple structure in Qutb Minar complex

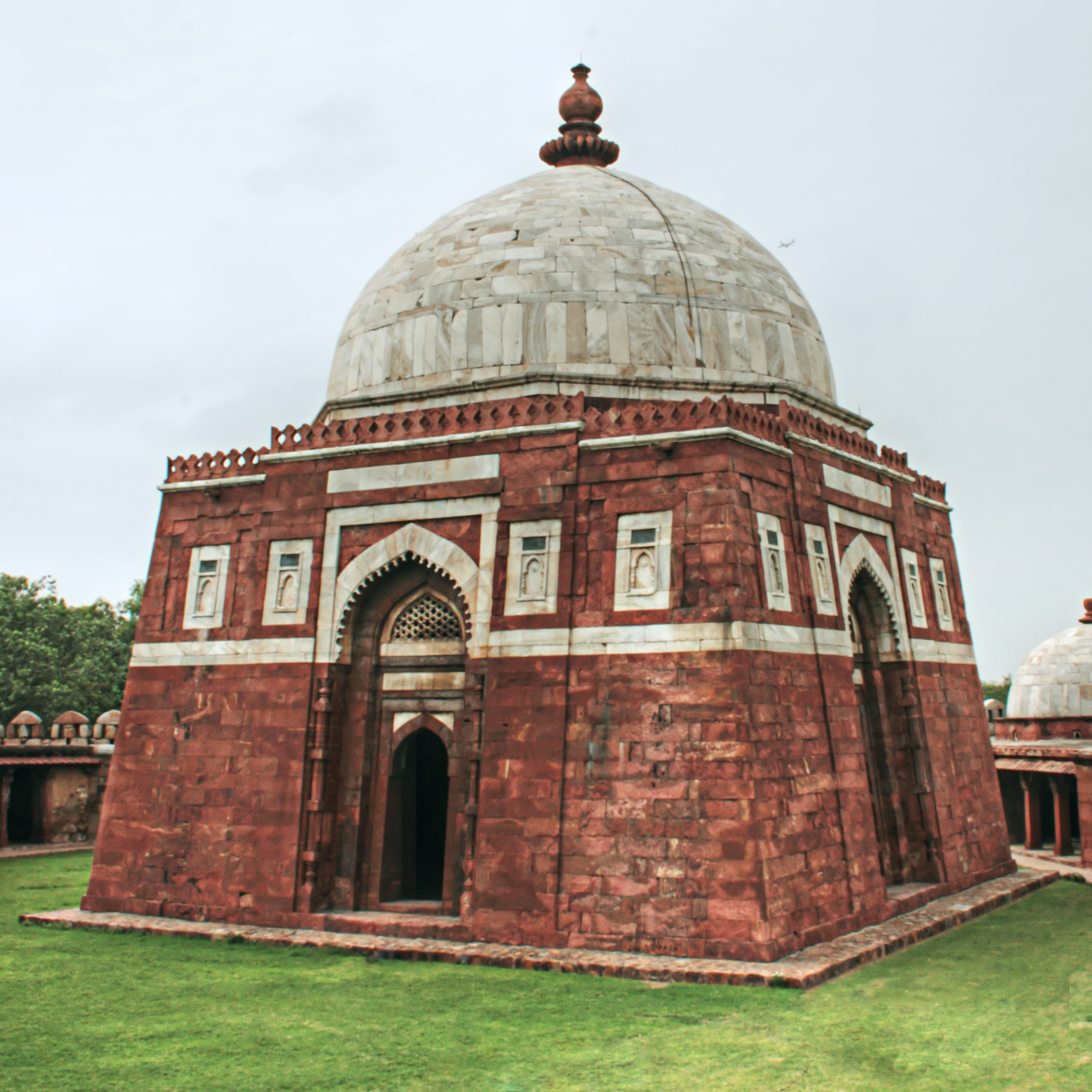
Tomb of Ghiyasuddin Tughluq

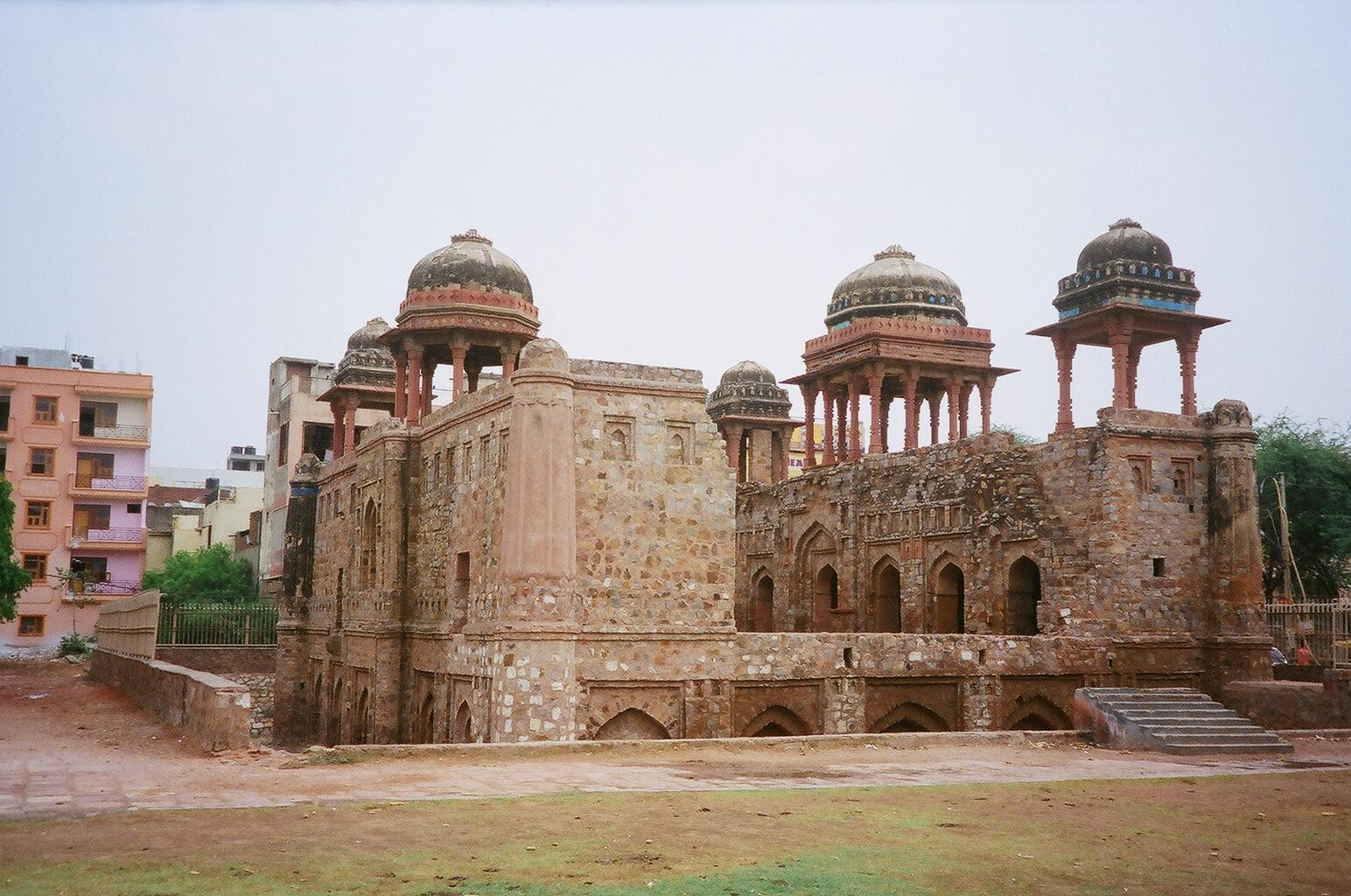
Jahaz Mahal is built during the Lodi dynasty period (1452–1526) as a pleasure resort.

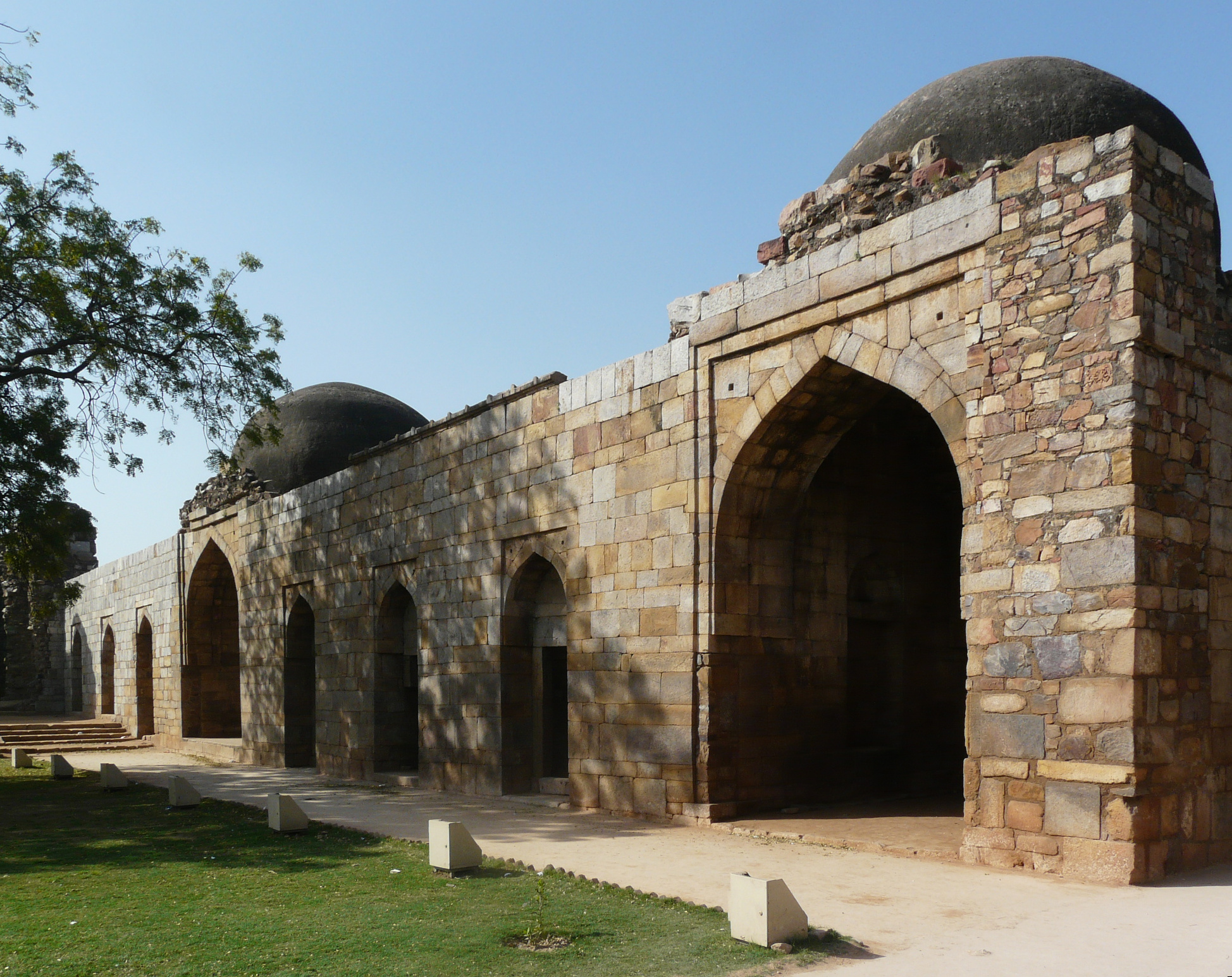
Alauddin Khilji's madrasa and Tomb in the Qutb complex.

=== Timur ===
In 1398, Timur invaded India on the pretext that the Muslim sultans of Delhi were too tolerant of their Hindu subjects. After defeating the armies of Nasiruddin Mahmud of Tughlaq dynasty, on 15 December 1398, Timur entered Delhi on 18 December 1398, and the city was sacked, destroyed, and left in ruins, and over 100,000 war prisoners were killed as well.

=== Defeat of the Lodi sultans ===
In 1526, following the First Battle of Panipat, Zahiruddin Babur, the former ruler of Fergana, defeated the last Afghan Lodi sultan and founded the Mughal dynasty which ruled from Delhi, Agra and Lahore.

== Mughal Rule ==
The early modern period in Indian history is marked with the rise of the Mughal Empire between the 16th and 18th centuries. After the fall of the Delhi Sultanate, the Mughals ruled from Agra, Sikri and Lahore, but the city once became the capital in 1648 during the rule of Shah Jahan, and remained the capital until the fall of the empire. During this time, Delhi became a center for culture, and poets such as Ghalib, Dard, Dagh and Zauq lived in the city and sought patronage of the emperor. The Mughals also built several monuments in the city including Humayun's Tomb, Red Fort, and Jama Masjid.

=== Babur and Humayun (1526–1556) ===
The first Mughal Emperors Babur (1526–1530) and Humayun (1530–1540, restored 1556–57) ruled from Agra, unlike the preceding Delhi Sultans.

In the mid-16th century there was an interruption in the Mughal rule of India as Sher Shah Suri defeated Humayun and forced him to flee to Persia. Sher Shah Suri built the sixth city of Delhi, as well as the old fort known as Purana Qila, even though this city was settled since the ancient era. After Sher Shah Suri's death in 1545, his son Islam Shah took the reins of north India from Delhi. Islam Shah ruled from Delhi. Then Humayun was briefly restored; but meanwhile in 1553 the Hindu Hemu became the Prime Minister and Chief of Army of Adil Shah.

Hemu fought and won 22 battles in all against rebels and (twice) against the Mughal Akbar's army in Agra and Delhi, without losing any. After defeating Akbar's army on 7 October 1556 at Tughlaqabad fort area in Battle of Delhi, Hemu acceded to Delhi throne and established Hindu Raj in North India for a brief period, taking the title 'Vikramaditya' at his coronation in Purana Quila, Delhi. Hemu was defeated at the second battle of Panipat by Mughal forces led by Akbar's regent Bairam Khan, thus reinstating Mughal rule in the region.

=== Akbar to Aurangzeb (1556–1707) ===
The third and greatest Mughal emperor, Akbar (1556–1605), continued to rule from Agra, resulting in a decline in the fortunes of Delhi.

In the mid-17th century, the Mughal Emperor Shah Jahan (1628–1658) built the city that sometimes bears his name Shahjahanabad, the seventh city of Delhi that is now commonly known as the old city or old Delhi. This city contains a number of significant architectural features, including the Red Fort (Lal Qila) and the Jama Masjid. The city served as the capital of the later Mughal Empire from 1638 onward, when Shah Jahan transferred the capital back from Agra.

Aurangzeb (1658–1707) crowned himself as emperor in Delhi in 1658 at the Shalimar garden ('Aizzabad-Bagh) with a second coronation in 1659.

After 1680, the Mughal Empire's influence declined rapidly as the Hindu Maratha Empire rose to prominence.

=== Decline of Mughals ===
The Mughal Empire suffered several blows due to invasions from Marathas, Jats, Afghans and Sikhs. In 1737, Bajirao I marched towards Delhi with a huge army. The Marathas defeated the Mughals in the First Battle of Delhi. The Maratha forces sacked Delhi following their victory against the Mughals. In 1739, the Mughal Empire lost the huge Battle of Karnal in less than three hours against the numerically outnumbered but military superior Persian army led by Nader Shah during his invasion after which he completely sacked and looted Delhi, the Mughal capital, followed by massacre for 2 days, killing over 30,000 civilians and carrying away immense wealth including the Peacock Throne, the Daria-i-Noor, and Koh-i-Noor. Nader eventually agreed to leave the city and India after forcing the Mughal emperor Muhammad Shah I to beg him for mercy and granting him the keys of the city and the royal treasury.

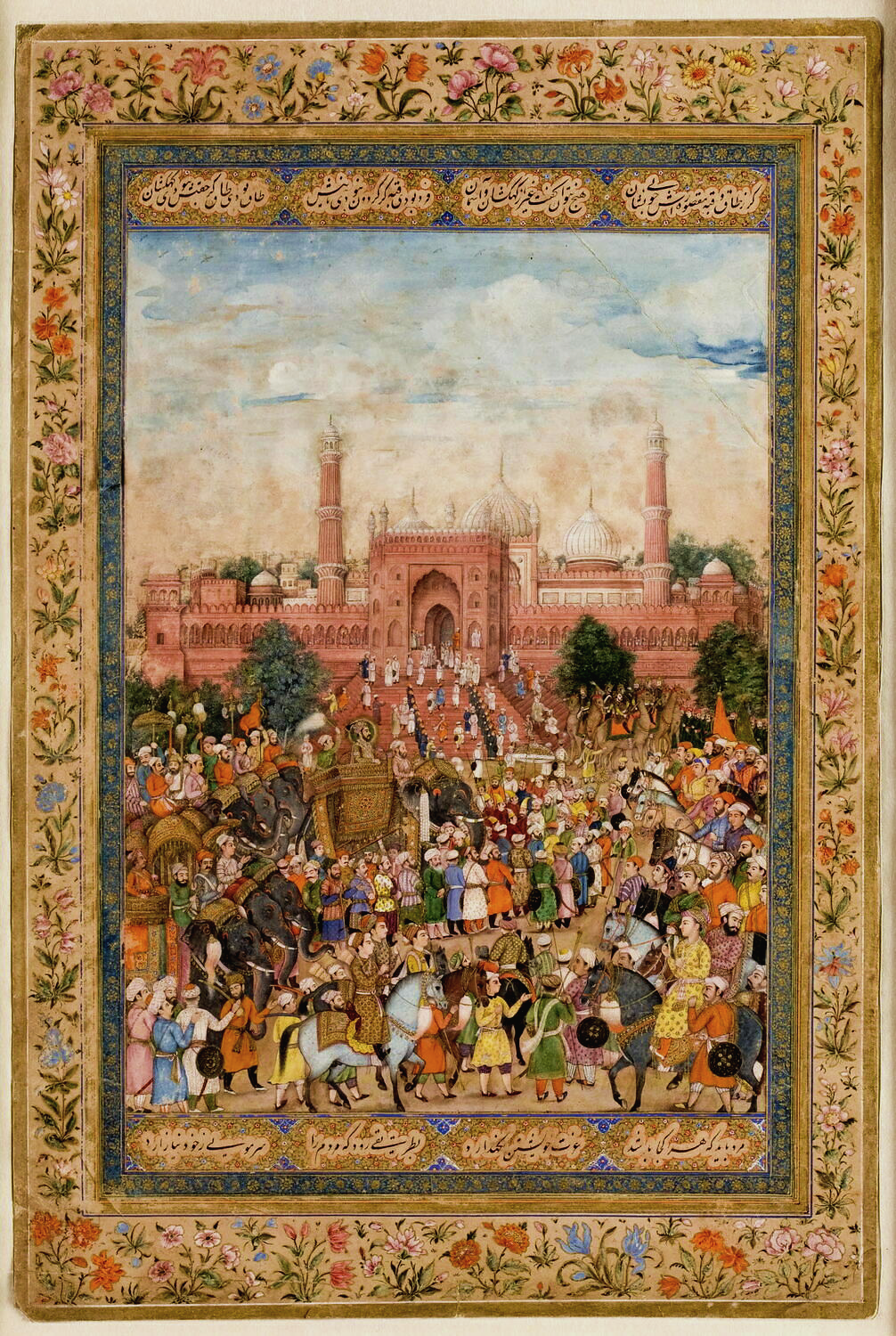
The Mughal Emperor Farrukhsiyar visits the Great Mosque of Delhi for the Friday prayers

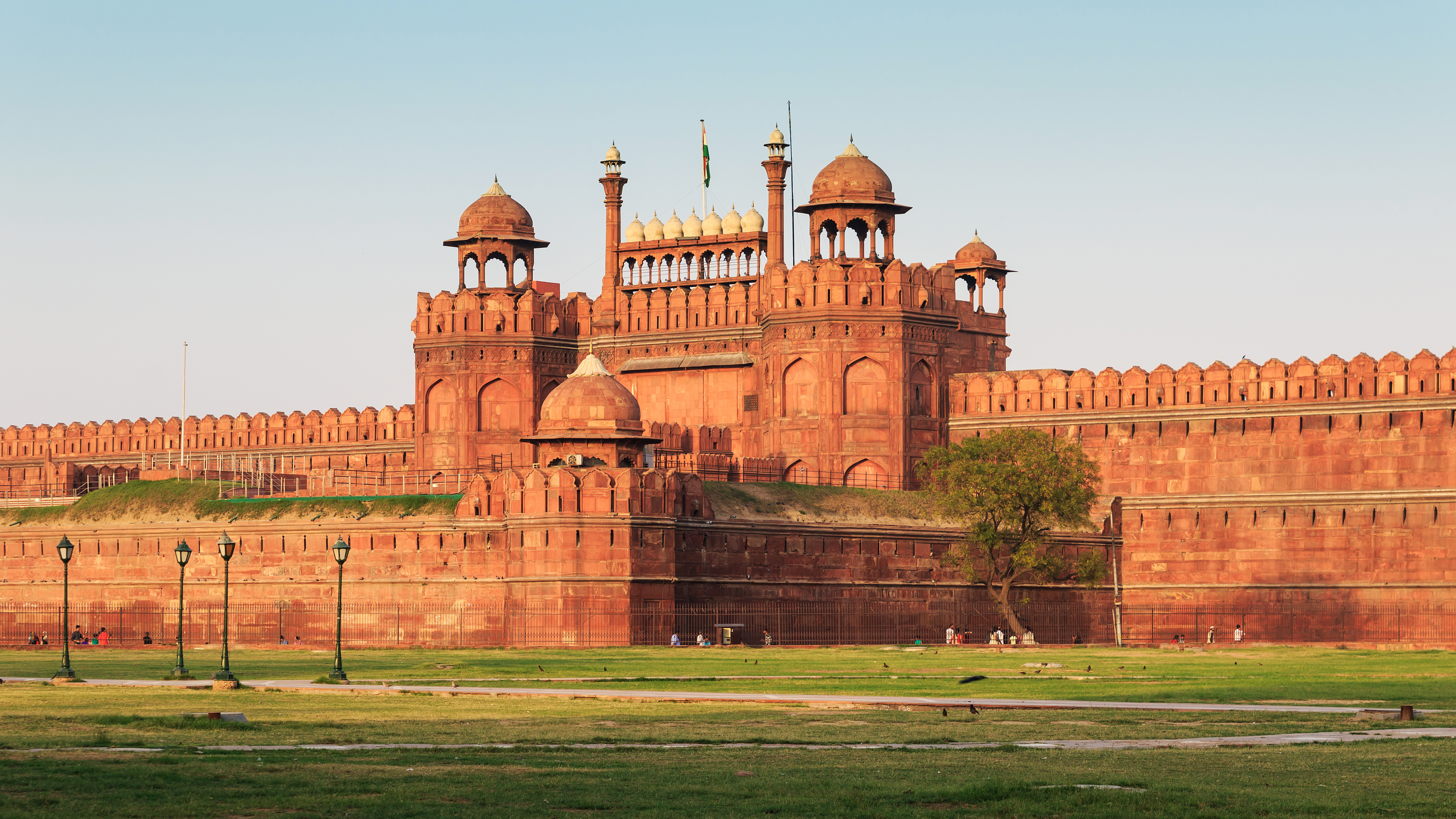
The Red Fort was commissioned by Mughal Emperor Shah Jahan in the 17th century, it was the main residence of the Mughal emperors for nearly 200 years.

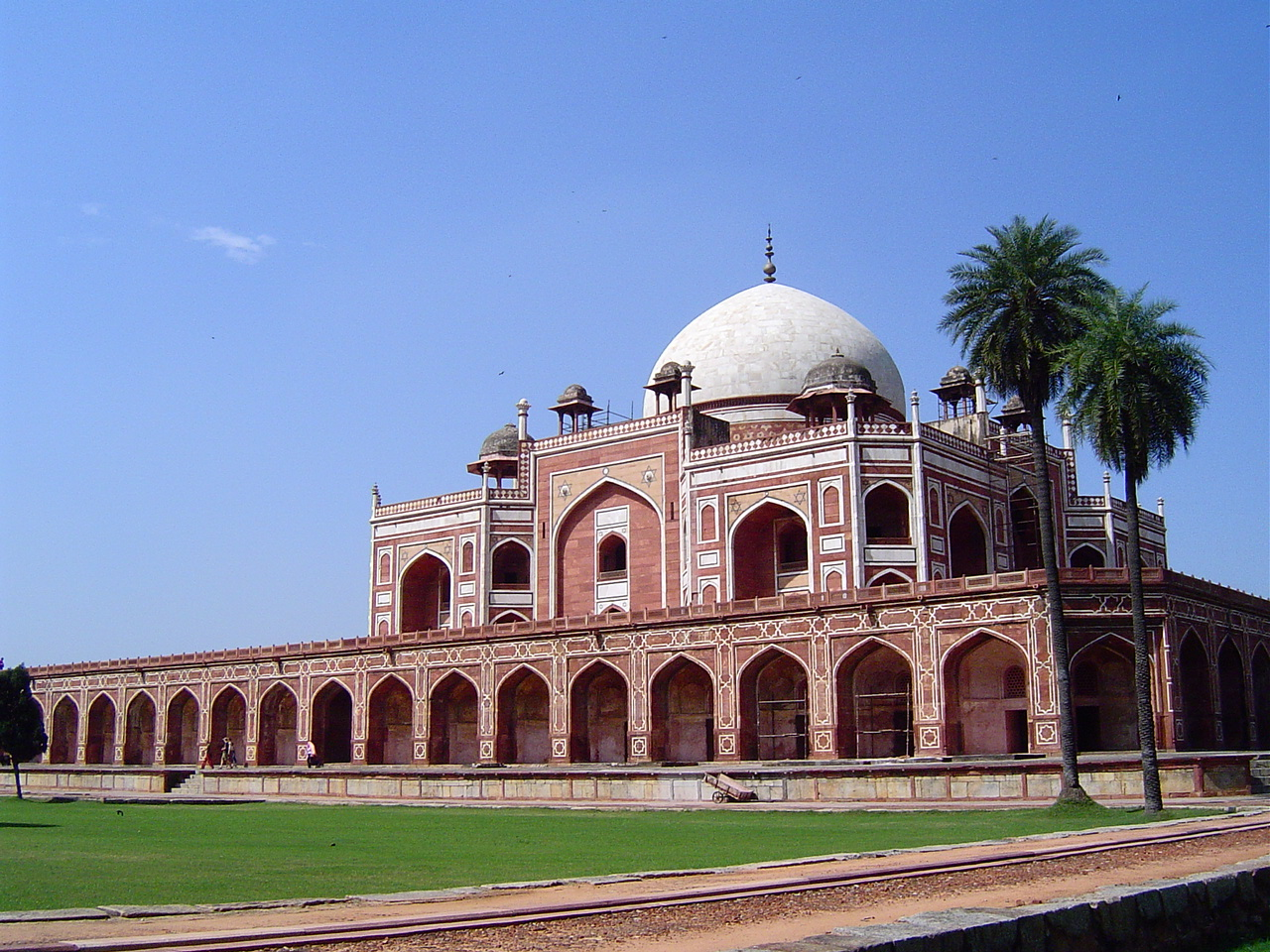
Humayun's Tomb is considered a predecessor to the Taj Mahal.

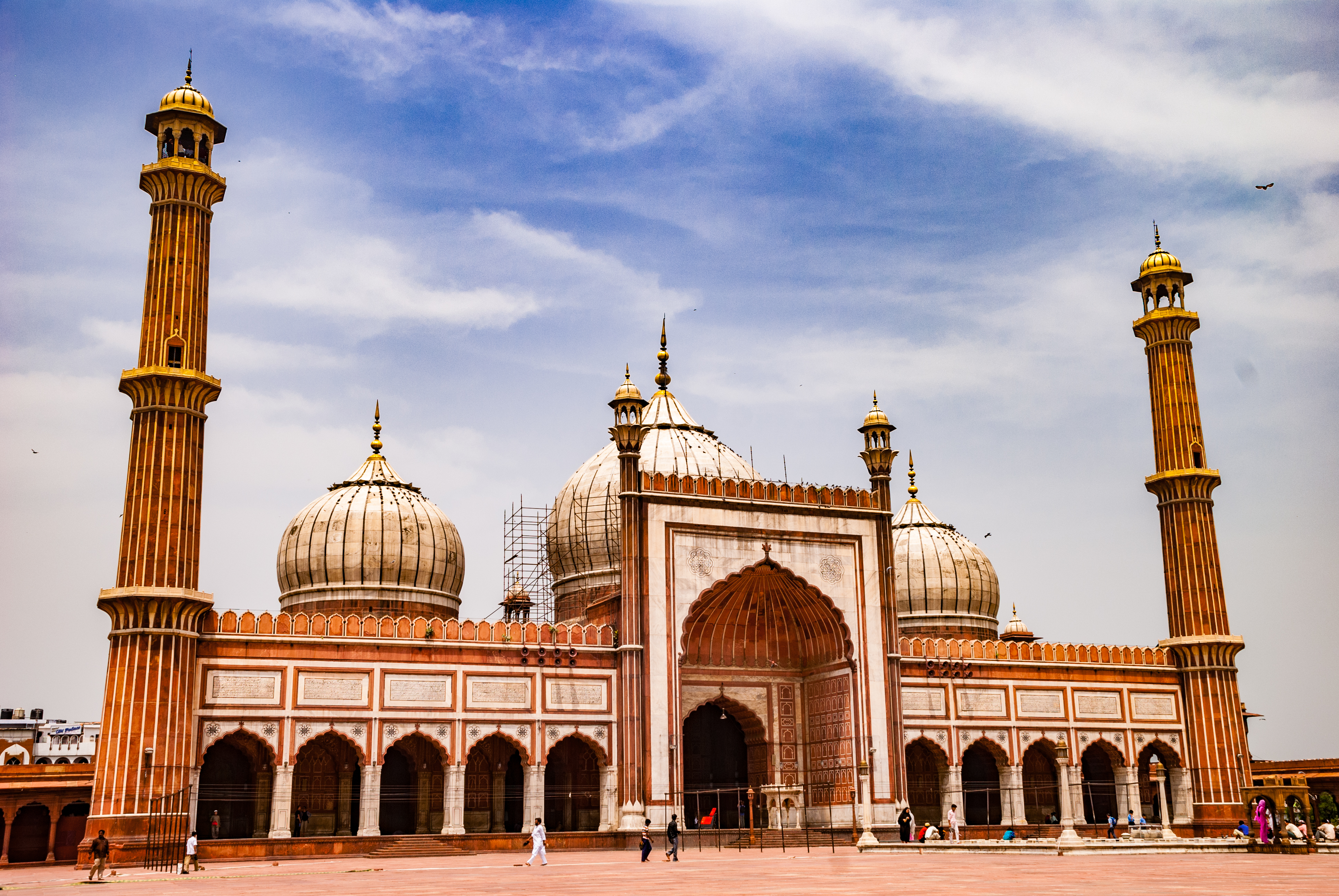
The Jama Masjid is one of the largest mosques in India.

== Maratha Rule ==
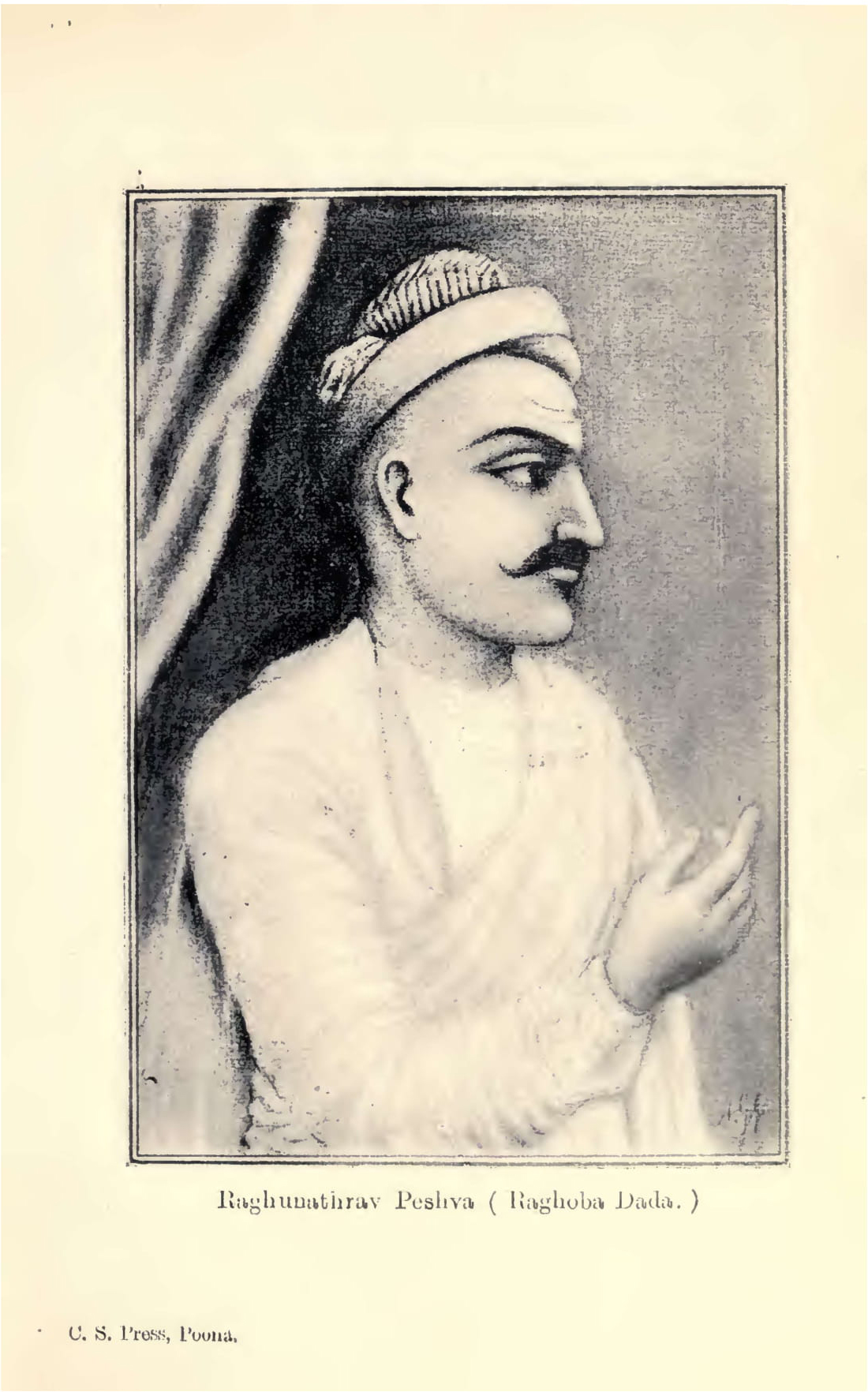
Raghunath Rao, the younger brother of Peshwa Balaji Bajirao, led the Battle of Delhi in 1757.

=== Maratha Protectorate ===
A treaty signed in 1752 made Marathas the protector of the Mughal throne at Delhi. In 1753 Jat ruler Suraj Mal attacked Delhi. He defeated Nawab of Delhi Ghazi-ud-din (second) and captured Delhi in the Capture of Delhi. Jats sacked Delhi from 9 May to 4 June. Ahmad Shah Durrani invaded North India for the fourth time in early 1757. He entered Delhi in January 1757 and kept the Mughal emperor under arrest. In August 1757, the Marathas once again attacked Delhi, decisively defeating Najib-ud-Daula and his Rohilla Afghan army in the Battle of Delhi (1757). Later, Ahmad Shah Durrani conquered Delhi in 1761, after the Third Battle of Panipat in which the Marathas were decisively defeated. Later, a treaty was made between the Marathas and Afghans that the Marathas would have all the lands east of the Sutlej river. Thus, the Marathas established full control over the city. Under the leadership of Jassa Singh Ahluwalia and Baghel Singh, Delhi was briefly conquered by the Sikh Empire in early 1783 in the Battle of Delhi (1783).

=== Decline of the Marathas ===
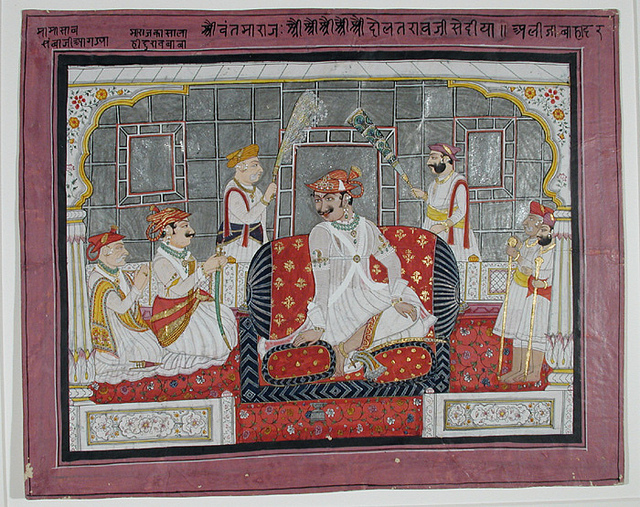
After losing the Battle of Delhi (1803) to the British, under Maratha ruler Daulat Rao Scindia, the Marathas lost control of Delhi and the right to collect chauth from the Mughals

In 1803, during the Second Anglo-Maratha War, the forces of British East India Company defeated the Maratha forces in the Battle of Delhi (1803), ending the Maratha rule over the city. As a result, Delhi came under the control of British East India Company, and became a part of the North-Western Provinces. The Mughal Emperor Shah Alam II remained a mere figurehead.

== British Rule ==
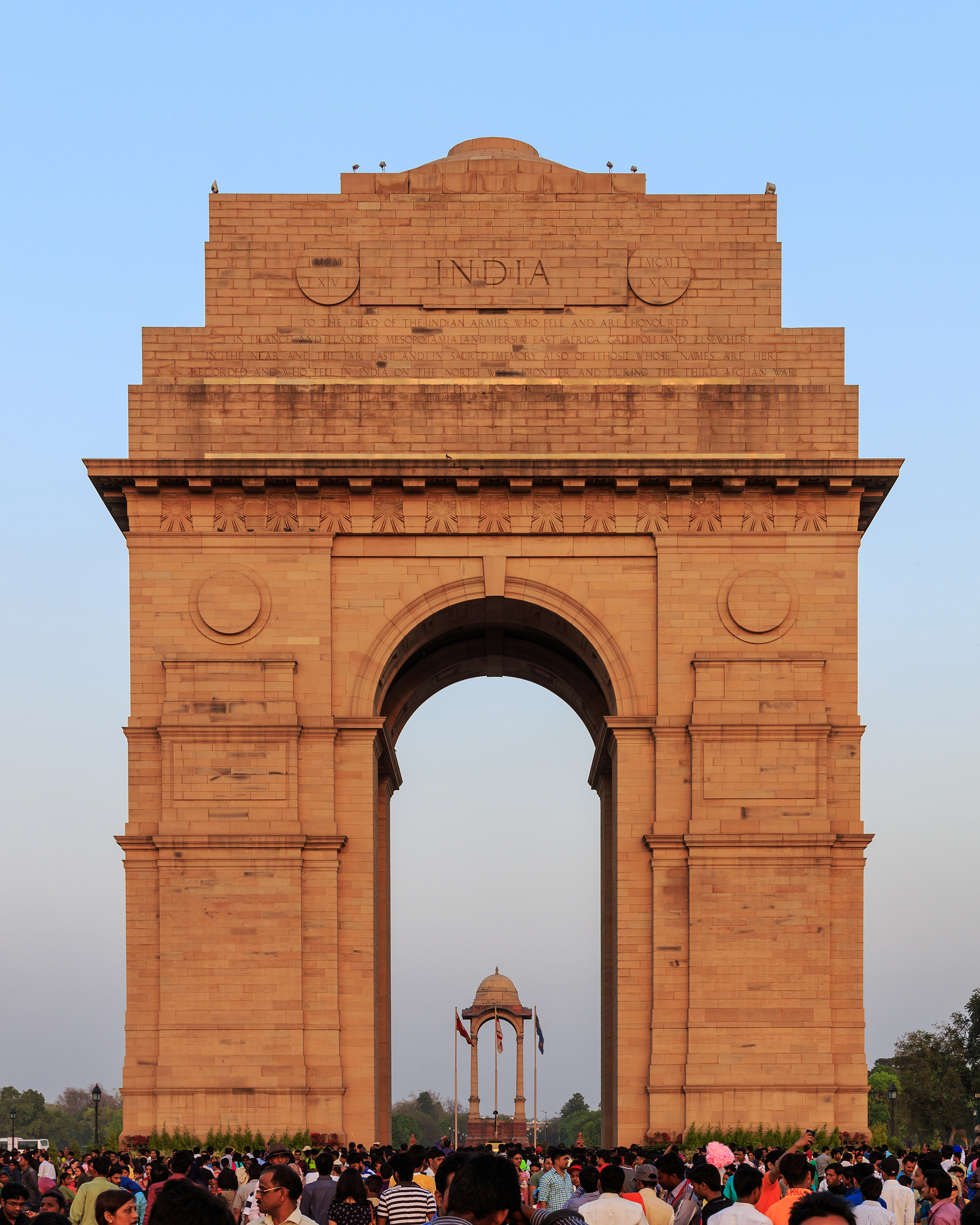
India Gate commemorates Indian soldiers who died in World War I and the Third Anglo-Afghan War.

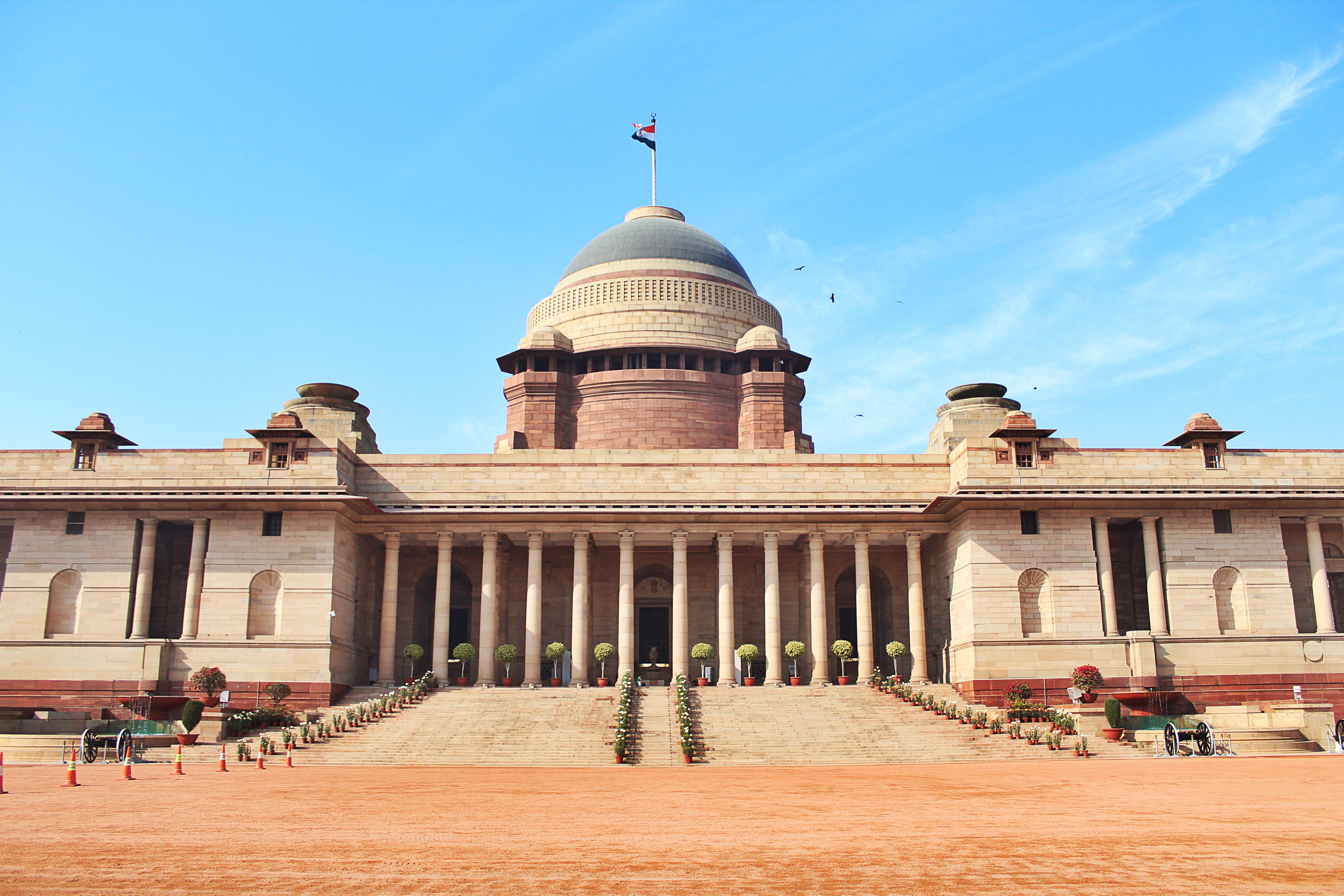
The Rashtrapati Bhavan (President's Palace) is the official residence of the President of India. Before independence, it used to be a residence for the British Viceroy.

=== Revolt of 1857 ===
The Indian Rebellion of 1857 sought to end Company Rule in India. On 11 May, the mutineers reached and captured Delhi, and declared Bahadur Shah Zafar II the Emperor of India, and the Emperor held his first court in many years. However, the British returned and laid siege to Delhi on 8 June 1857. On 21 September, Delhi finally fell into the hands of British troops. The city received significant damage during the battle. Afterwards, the last titular Mughal Emperor Bahadur Shah Zafar II was captured and exiled to Rangoon.

Delhi passed into the direct control of British Government in 1857 after the Indian Rebellion of 1857 and the remaining Mughal territories were annexed as a part of British India.

=== British Raj ===
Calcutta was the capital of British India till 1911 but in 1911 at the Delhi Durbar of 1911, held at the Coronation Park, King George V announced the shifting of the capital to Delhi. New Delhi designed by the British architect Edwin Lutyens was inaugurated in 1931 after its construction was delayed due to World War I. Originally King George V and Queen Mary announced the project, although it did receive major opposition from the European business community of Calcutta, along with Lord Curzon and Mahatma Gandhi. The project was fulfilled by a team of architects, engineers and contractors, namely Sir Edwin Lutyens, Sir Herbert Baker, Sir Teja Singh Malik, Walter Sykes George, Robert Tor Russell, Arthur Shoosmith, Sir Sobha Singh, Basakha Singh, Ram Singh Kabli, Narain Singh and Dharam Singh Sethi.

New Delhi was officially declared as the seat of the Government of India after independence in 1947.

== Post-Independence (1947–present) ==
During the partition of India, around five lakh Hindu and Sikh refugees, mainly from West Punjab fled to Delhi, while around three lakh Muslim residents of the city migrated to Pakistan. Ethnic Punjabis are believed to account for at least 40% of Delhi's total population and are predominantly Hindi-speaking Punjabi Hindus. Migration to Delhi from the rest of India continues (as of 2013), contributing more to the rise of Delhi's population than the birth rate, which is declining.

The States Reorganisation Act, 1956 created the Union Territory of Delhi from its predecessor, the Chief Commissioner's Province of Delhi. The Constitution (Sixty-ninth Amendment) Act, 1991 declared the Union Territory of Delhi to be formally known as the National Capital Territory of Delhi. The Act gave Delhi its own legislative assembly along Civil lines, though with limited powers. In 1985 the National Capital Region of India, a much larger area, was established, centered on Delhi.

After 1967 relations between Hindus and Muslims deteriorated to the level that there was a significant uptick in the number of riots and other disruption of civil life. One of the most significant was the 1973 riot in Bao Hindu Rao area, which resulted in the injury of 18 police officers and financial losses estimated to be around 500,000 Rupees, according to police sources. Another significant riot happened on 5 May 1974 in the Sadar Bazar area between Hindus and Muslims in which 11 people were killed and 92 were injured. This riot was the worst in Delhi since independence. The Centre for the Study of Developing Societies carried out a survey in nearby areas that showed significant division between Hindus and Muslims who saw each other negatively.

In 1966, an inscription of the Mauryan Emperor Ashoka (273-236 BCE) was discovered near Sriniwaspuri. Two sandstone pillars inscribed with the edicts of Ashoka were brought to by Firuz Shah Tughluq in the 14th century already exist in Delhi.

The 2020 Delhi riots took place in February 2020 in Northeast Delhi during protests against the Citizenship Amendment Act. The violence led to over 50 deaths and hundreds of injuries, along with damage to property. The clashes involved groups both supporting and opposing the CAA, and affected Hindu and Muslim communities. Following the riots, investigations were conducted and multiple court cases were filed.

In 2026 Delhi Jantar Mantar Protests, students across Delhi participated in protests over issues including exam transparency, paper leaks, high coaching fees, and admission policies. The demonstrations involved school and college students, particularly those preparing for competitive exams like JEE and NEET. Protesters demanded education reforms, affordable coaching, and better mental health support for students.

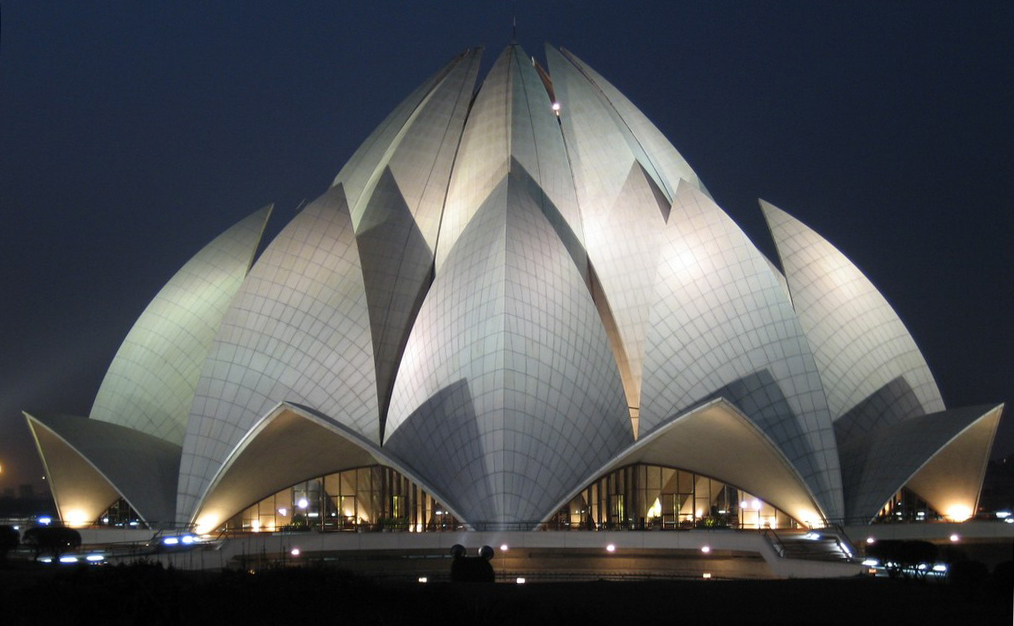
The Lotus Temple

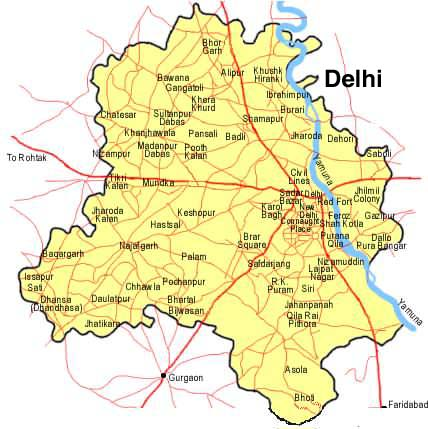
Delhi today.

The Raj Ghat, where Mahatma Gandhi was cremated.

== See also ==
- Agrasen ki Baoli
- Gates of Delhi
- Mehrauli Archaeological Park

== Bibliography ==
- Kishore, Raghav (2016). "Planning, traffic and the city: railway development in colonial Delhi, c. 1899–1905". Urban History. 44 (2): 1–17. doi:10.1017/S0963926816000353. S2CID 151717699.
- "History of Delhi District". The Imperial Gazetteer of India. Vol. 11. Oxford: Clarendon Press. 1909. p. 225. Archived from the original on 10 April 2022.
- Kapoor, Pramod; Singh, Malvika; Mukherjee, Rudrangshu (2009). New Delhi: Making of a Capital. Lustre Press. ISBN 978-81-7436-574-3.
- Byron, Robert (1931). New Delhi. Westminster: The Architectural Review.
- Hartcourt, A. (1873). The New guide to Delhi. Lahore: Victoria Press.
- Fanshawe, H. C. (1902). Delhi – Past and Present. London: J. Murray.
- Fraser, Lovat (1903). At Delhi (An account of the Delhi Durbar, 1903). Bombay: Times of India Press and Thacker.
- Bardiar, Nilendra. Urban, Cultural, Economic and Social Transformation: History of New Delhi (1947-65). New Delhi: Ruby Press. Archived from the original on 15 April 2014.
- Hearn, Gordon Risley (1906). The Seven Cities of Delhi. London: W. Thacker & Co.
