= Geetanjali Babbar =

Indian social reformer

Geetanjali Babbar is the founder and director of a non-profit named Kat-Katha that works to empower and liberate sex workers in brothels of the largest red light area known as G.B. Road of Delhi.

== Education and early years ==
Geetanjali graduated with honours from Maharaja Agrasen College, Delhi University with a degree in journalism and has a post-graduation in development communications from Jamia Milia Islami University. She received a Gandhi Fellowship in 2010, a two-year leadership program. and 2013 Laureate Global Fellowship.

While studying, she was involved with National AIDS Control Organisation (NACO) where she got a chance to closely work with eunuchs.

== Kat-Katha ==
While working with the National AIDS Control Organisation, she visited Delhi's GB Road for the first time and got an opportunity to meet sex workers. She learned that these sex workers were made to serve 20-40 customers in a day, and that the women urgently needed a support system to talk about their personal lives and issues apart from gaining safe sex information. She refused high-profile job offers to set up Kat-Katha that aims to improve the lives of the sex workers in Delhi's infamous GB Road red light area.

She helps them nurture their dreams, educate, and enrich their community. She encourages them to join mainstream life by helping them learn arts like stitching, embroidery, painting and motivates them to explore alternate life choices.

Today, Kat-Katha serves 3,600-4,000 sex workers and teaches them a new way of life. Her organisation has 12 teachers from well-known colleges for its educational program and is taking care of 10-12 brothels. With the help of Kat-katha, 3 women are successfully working as tailors, along with 26 sex workers and 21 children who are being given quality education.

In addition to the training, the center also provides safe zones for the women and their children. Kat-Katha also helps children of these women to spend their childhood out of the gloomy world. She believes that community participation is at the very core of this initiative.

She spoke at TEDx Talk and was the on-air contest winner (Theme-Delhi ke Heroes) at Radio Mirchi 98.3 FM's 'FLAT 983'.
