= Agrasen Ki Baoli =

Stepwell in New Delhi, India

Agrasen ki Baoli
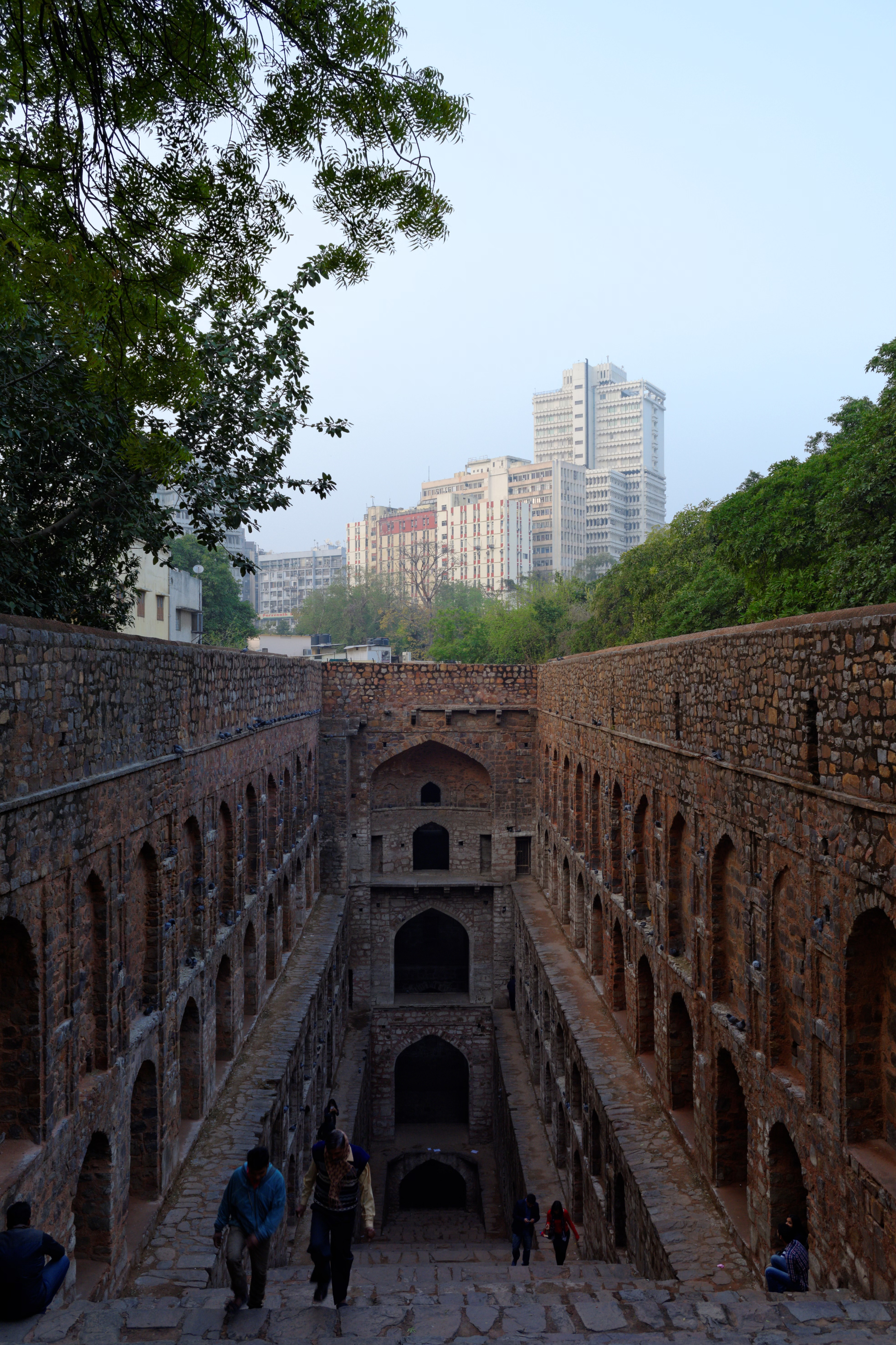
- Agrasen ki Baoli, in 2014
- Interactive map of Agrasen ki Baoli
- 28°37′34″N 77°13′30″E
- Type: Stepwell
- Location: Hailey Road, Delhi, India

History
- Built: 1506; 520 years ago

Monument of National Importance
- Official name: Uggar Sain's Baoli
- Reference no.: N-DL-52

Agrasen Ki Baoli (also known as Ugrasen Ki Baoli; transl. Baoli of Agrasen) is a 60-meter long and 15-meter wide historical stepwell in New Delhi, India.

Located on Hailey Road, (Note: Named after administrator Malcolm Hailey.) (Note: The connecting road between Kasturba Gandhi Road and Barakhamba Road.) near Connaught Place, Jantar Mantar, it was designated a protected monument by the Archaeological Survey of India (ASI) under the Ancient Monuments and Archaeological Sites and Remains Act of 1958.

Although there are no known historical records to prove who built the stepwell, it is believed that it was originally built by members of the Aggarwal community in the name of their ancestor Agrasen, and the present architecture hints at it being rebuilt in the 14th century during the Tughlaq or Lodi period of the Delhi Sultanate. The baoli is open daily from 9 am to 5:30 pm.

== Toponymy ==
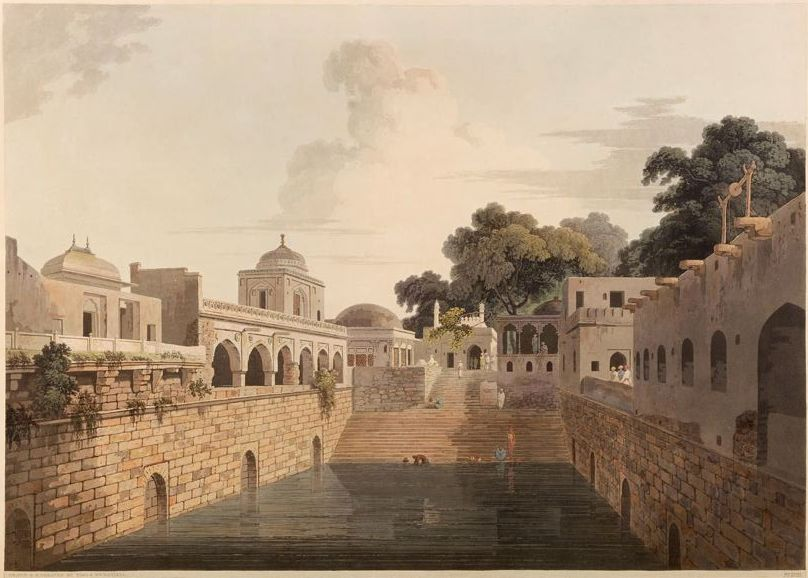
A baoli in Delhi from the book Oriental Scenery, 1816 resembling, Agrasen Ki Baoli.

Baoli or bawdi, also referred to as baori or bauri, is a Hindi word (from Sanskrit wapi or vapi, vapika). In Rajasthan and Gujarat the words for stepwell include baoli, bavadi, vav, vavdi and vavadi. Water temples and temple stepwells were built in ancient India. The earliest forms of stepwell and reservoir were also built in India in places like Dholavira as far back as the Indus Valley Civilisation.

== Architecture ==
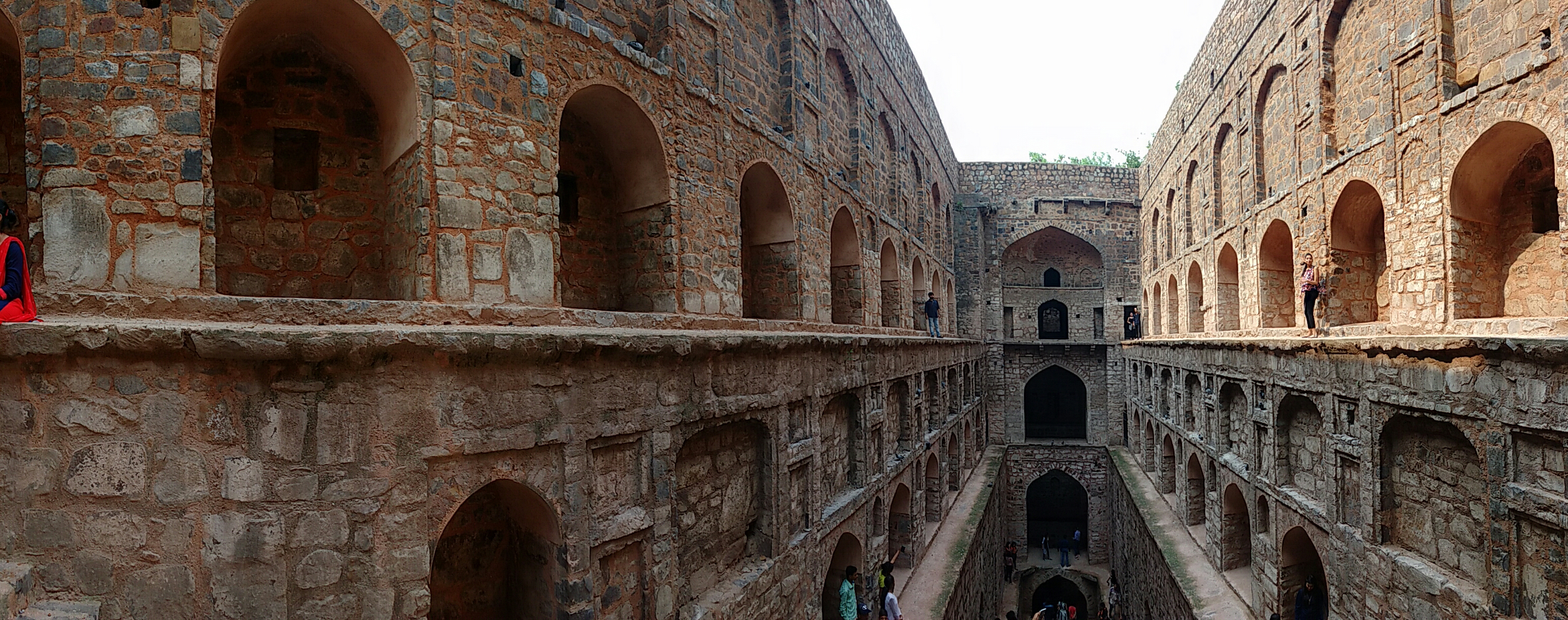
Panoramic view of Agrasen Ki Baoli

This baoli, with 108 steps, is among a few of its kind in Delhi. Three levels of the historic stepwell are visible. Each level is lined with arched niches on both sides. From an architectural perspective, this stepwell was probably rebuilt during the Tughlaq or Lodi period and is flanked by a small three-sided mosque towards the west. a very clear Persian-style architecture – bioclimatic architecture

== In popular culture ==
The location has been used to shoot scenes from various Bollywood films, such as Kabhi Alvida na Kehna, Shubh Mangal Savdhan. Blockbuster film PK starring Aamir Khan and Sultan starring Salman Khan were also shot here. It was also featured in the 2017 Sridevi thriller Mom . The stepwell also appeared on the second episode of The Amazing Race Australia 2 in 2012.

There are also urban legends of the stepwell being haunted.

== Gallery ==
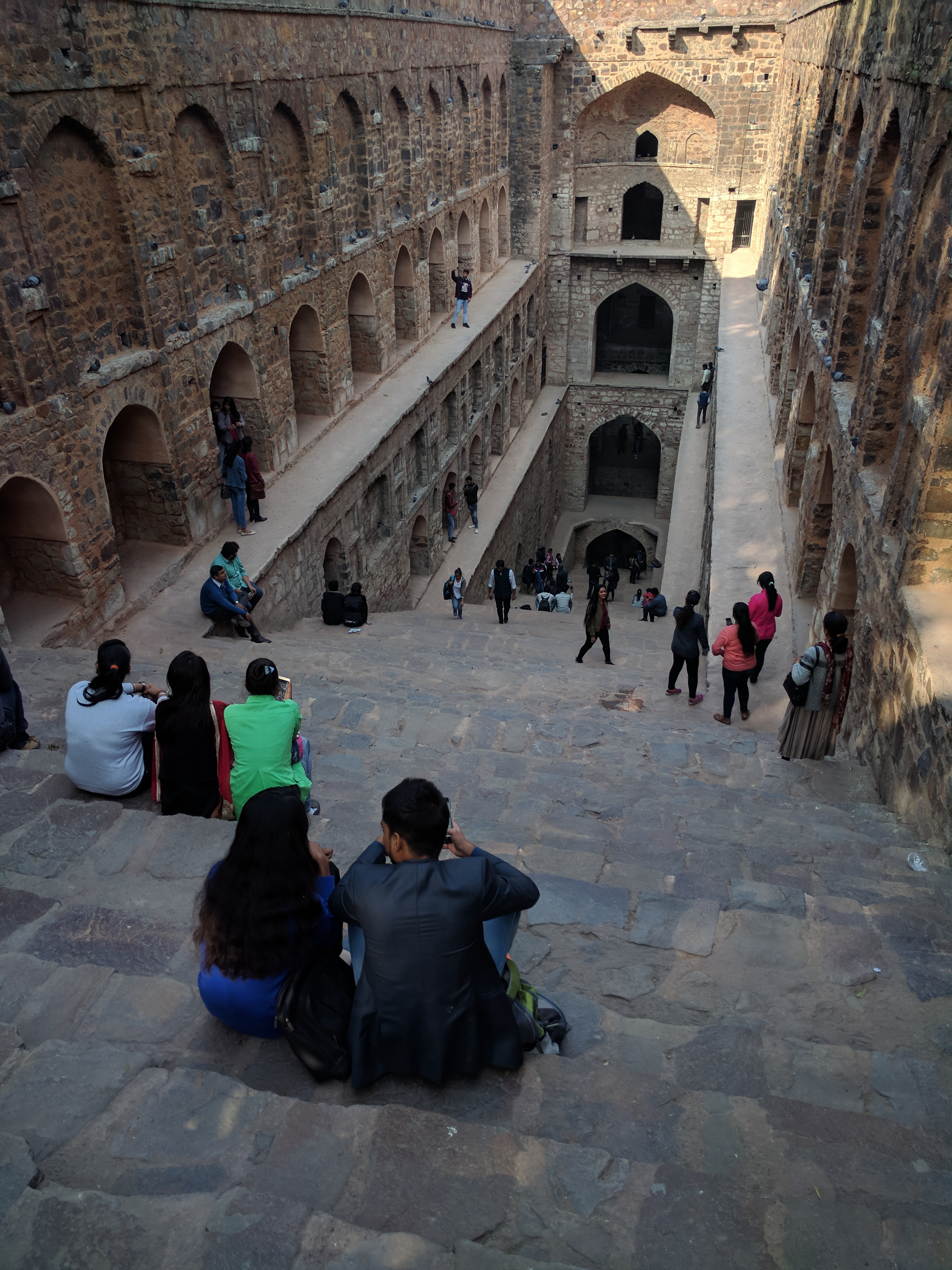
Agrasen Ki Baoli is a popular tourist destination.

== See also ==
- History of Delhi
  - Paleolithic sites in & around Delhi
  - Forts and palaces of Delhi used as the capital
  - Stepwells of Delhi
- Stepwells of India
  - Rani ki vav, UNESCO heritage listed
  - List of stepwells in India by states
- History of water supply and sanitation
  - Water supply and sanitation in the Indus-Saraswati Valley Civilisation
  - Ancient water conservation techniques
