= Agrasen =

Legendary Indian king of Agroha

- Maharaja
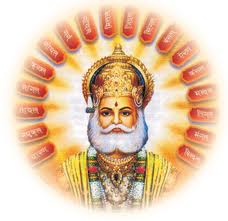
- Predecessor: Maharaja Vallabhsen
- Successor: Shail
- Consort: Nandini
- Issue: Vibhu
- House: Raghuvansham
- Dynasty: Suryavamsha /Ikshvaku; Raghuvamsha
- Father: Maharaja Vallabh
- Mother: Bhagwati Devi

Agrasen, most commonly known as Maharaja (literally, great king) Agrasen, was a legendary Indian king of Agroha, a city of traders in the district of Hisar, Haryana. He is claimed to be a descendant of the Hindu deity, Shri Ramchandra. He is credited with the establishment of a kingdom of traders in Northern India named Agroha, and is known for his compassion in refusing sacrificial slaughter of animals in yajnas. Goddess Mahalakshmi bestowed prosperity for him and his descendants.

The Agrawals, a community of traditional traders from northern India, regard Maharaja Agrasen as their forefather and a historical figure who established the foundations of their community in the Kingdom of Agroha. In fact, the term Agrawal means "descendants of Agrasen" or "people of Agroha". The Agraharis also claim descent from him.

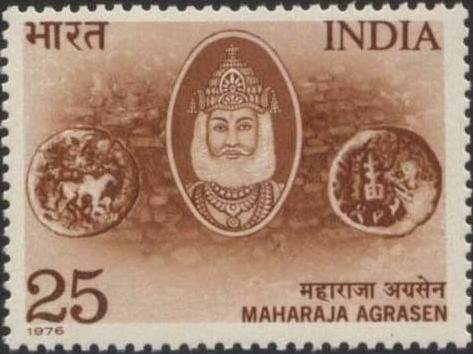
Postage stamp issued by the Government of India in 1976, commemorating Maharaja Agrasen's 5100th birth anniversary.

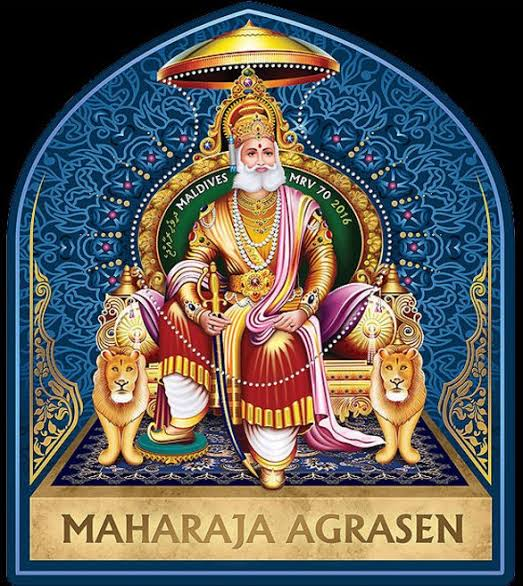
Postage stamp issued by the Maldives in 2016 on Maharaja Agrasen's birth anniversary.

The occasion of his birth anniversary called Agrasen Jayanti is celebrated in the Indian states of Haryana, Punjab, Rajasthan, and Uttar Pradesh where it is recognized as a public or a gazetted holiday. The Government of India in 1976 commemorated the 5100th birth anniversary of Maharaja Agrasen by issuing a postage stamp depicting him, and so did Maldives in 2016 as a tribute to the contributions of the Agrawal community, a prominent business group in India, in the growing trade relationship between the Maldives and India. The eastern wing of the modern day Agroha Dham temple is dedicated to Maharaja Agrasen, serving as a significant cultural and heritage center for the Agrawal community.

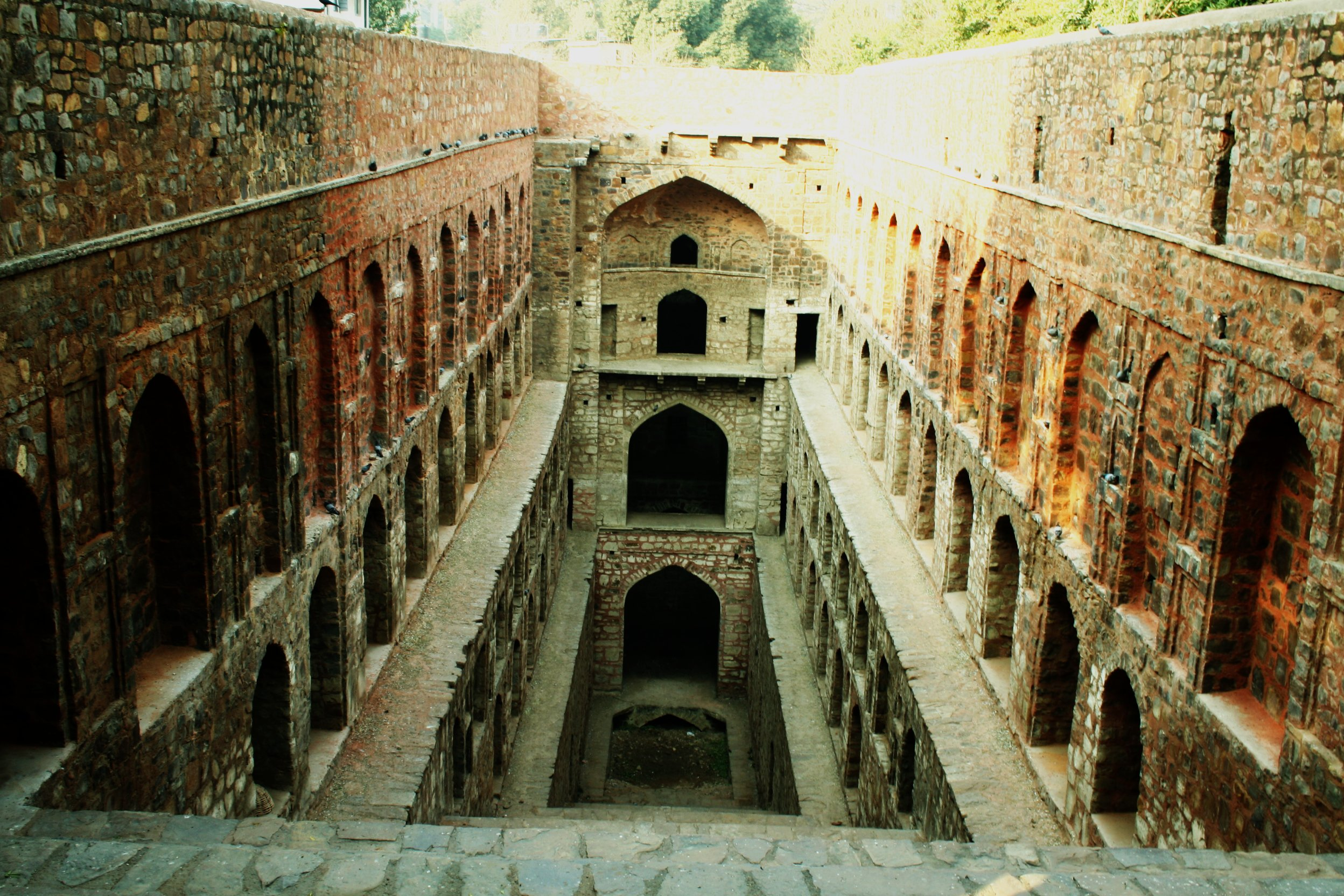
Agrasen ki Baoli in Delhi. The current structure was built in the 14th century by the Agrawal community, which traces its origin to King Agrasen. It is believed that the original structure was built by the king Agrasen during the Mahabharat epic era.

== History ==
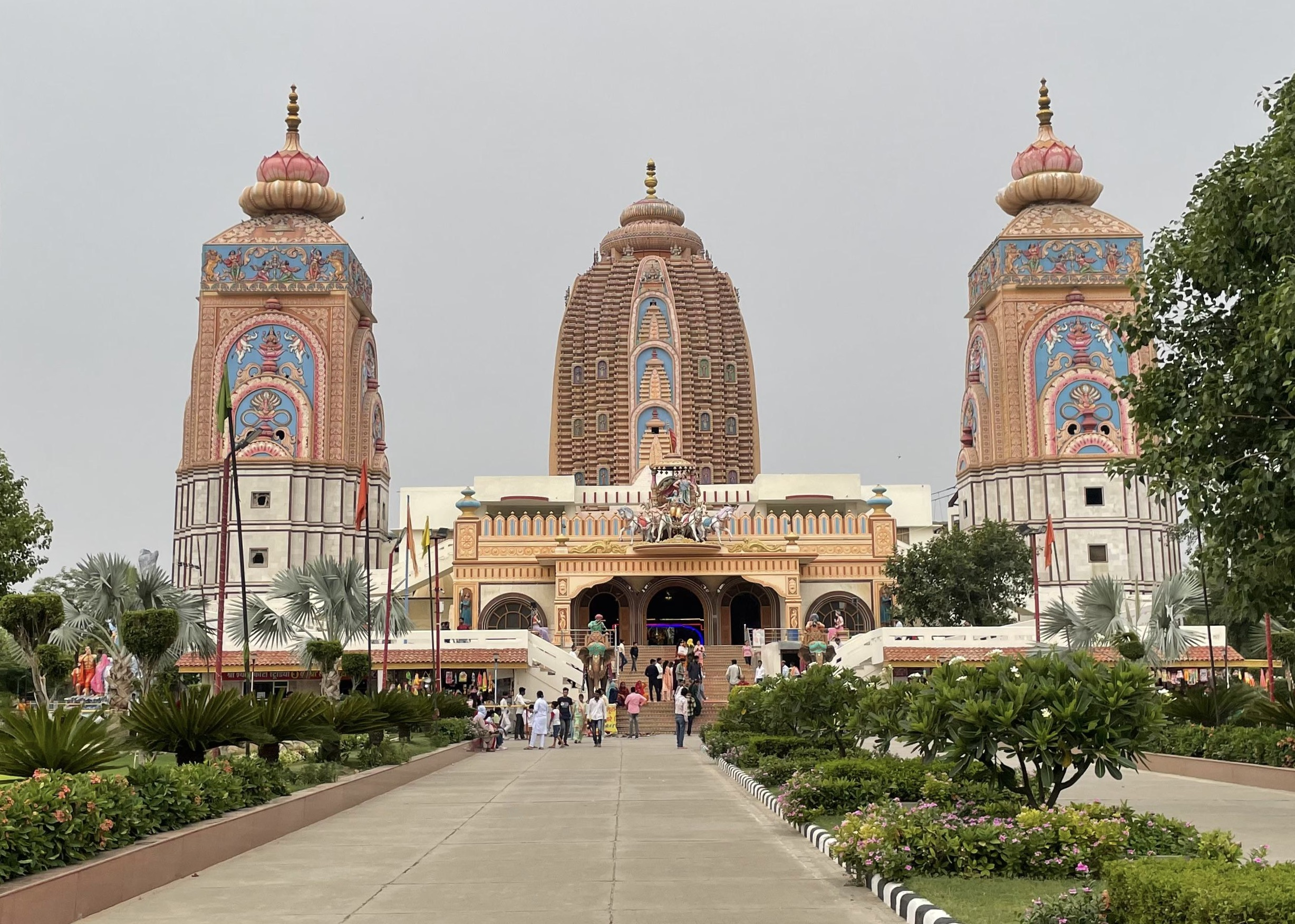
The grand entrance of the Agroha Dham Hindu temple located in Agroha, Hisar district, Haryana. The temple is dedicated to goddess Mahalakshmi, the Kuladevi of the Agrawals, who trace their origins to Agroha, whose foundations were laid by the great king Maharaja Agrasen.

Bharatendu Harishchandra (1850-1885), a renowned Agrawal author and poet, compiled the legend of Maharaja Agrasen in his 1871 essay Agarwalon ki Utpatti ("Origins of Agrawals and Agrahari"). Bhartendu is not clear about his sources, stating that he compiled the legend from "tradition" and "ancient writings", naming one of these texts as Sri Mahalakshmi Vrat Ki Katha ("The Story of the Fast for Goddess Mahalakshmi"). He claimed to have found this text in a "later" part of the Bhavishya Purana, which exists in several recensions. However, subsequent researchers were unsuccessful in tracing this text in any published version of the "Bhavishya Purana. In 1976, the Agrawal historian Satyaketu Vidyalankar published a copy of the Mahalakshmi Vrat Ki Katha in his Agrwal Jati Ka Prachin Itihas ("Ancient History of the Agrawal caste"). He states that he had found this copy in the personal library of Bharatendu Harishchandra; some academics note that this copy does not contain any clue about its origin.

== Legend ==
Agrasen was a Kshatriya king of the Sūryavaṃśi dynasty who promoted the Vanika dharma for the benefit of his people. He was the ruler of Khandavprasth, Ballabhgarh, and Agr Janapada (present-day Delhi, Ballabhgarh, and Agra).

According to Bharatendu Harishchandra's account, Maharaja Agrasen was born on 15th September 3082 BC, or in 4250 BC on the first day of Ashvin Shukla Paksha, in the last stages of Dvapara Yuga, or the beginning of Kali Yuga. He was the eldest son of Sūryavaṃśi Maharaja Vallabhsen and Queen Bhagwati Devi of Pratapnagar (in present-day Rajasthan) and the elder brother of Shursen. Maharaja Agrasen was claimed to be a 34th-generation descendant of the lineage of Lord Rama's elder son, Kush. At the age of 15, Agrasen fought in the Mahabharata war alongside the Pandavas. Lord Krishna proclaimed that Agrasen would be a yug purush, or "man of the age," and an avatar in the Kali Yuga.

=== Marriage to Madhavi ===
He was married to Madhavi, the daughter of the serpent king Nagaraja Kumud, with whom Indra was also smitten. When she chose Agrasen as her husband, Indra, the lord of thunderstorms and rain could not bear her loss and created a drought in Pratapnagar. The famine in Agrasen's kingdom forced him to go to war against Indra, but sage Narada brokered peace.

=== Agrasen's Austerities ===
Maharaja Agrasen went to the city of Kāshi and performed intense tapasya (austerity) for the welfare of his subjects. Pleased with his devotion, Lord Shiva advised him to perform tapasya for Goddess Lakshmi. Goddess Lakshmi, pleased with his selfless austerities, granted him a boon: “Establish a new kingdom and, while following the principles of Kshatriya dharma, nurture and protect your kingdom and subjects! Your kingdom will always be filled with wealth and abundance.” Goddess Lakshmi is the kuldevi of (many) Agrawals.

== Agrawal gotras ==
Per Bharatendu Harishchandra, the Agarwals are organized into seventeen and a half gotras (exogamous clans), which came into being from seventeen and a half sacrifices performed by Agrasen. The last sacrifice is considered "half" because it was abandoned after Agrasen expressed remorse for the violent animal sacrifices. Bharatendu also mentions that Agrasen had 17 queens and a junior queen, but does not mention any connection between these queens and the formation of the gotras. Neither does he explain how sacrifices led to the formation of the gotras.

Historically, due to regional differences there has been no single unanimous list of these seventeen and a half gotras. In 1983, The Akhil Bhartiya Aggarwal Sammelan, a major organization of Agrawals (also Baranwals), ratified a list of Agarwal gotras. To avoid classification of any particular gotra as "half", the Sammelan provides a list of following 18 gotras:

1. Garg
2. Goyal
3. Kucchal (Agrahari)
4. Kansal
5. Bindal
6. Dharan
7. Singhal
8. Jindal
9. Mittal
10. Tingal
11. Tayal
12. Bansal
13. Bhandal
14. Nangal
15. Mangal
16. Airan
17. Madhukul
18. Goyan

The list does not include several existing clans such as Kotrivala, Pasari, Mudgal, Tibreval, and Singhla.

== Legacy ==
- Anniversary
  - Agrasen Jayanti
- Education
  - Delhi
    - Maharaja Agrasen College of the University of Delhi in Vasundhara Enclave
    - Maharaja Agrasen Institute Of Technology of Guru Gobind Singh Indraprastha University in Rohini
  - Haryana
    - Maharaja Agrasen Institute of Management and Technology at Yamunanagar
    - Maharaja Agrasen College, Jagadhri at Yamunanagar
    - Maharaja Agrasen Medical College, Agroha in Hisar in Haryana
  - Himachal Pradesh
    - Maharaja Agrasen University at Solan district
  - Uttar Pradesh
    - Maharaja Agrasen College of Engineering and Technology
- Hospital
  - Maharaja Agrasen Hospital (Bangalore)
  - Maharaja Agrasen Hospital (New Delhi) at Palam
- Other
  - Agrasen ki Baoli
  - Maharaja Agrasen International Airport, Hisar

== See also ==
- Agroha development plan
- List of Hindu empires and dynasties
