= Maharaja Agrasen Hospital (New Delhi) =

Medical college in New Delhi, India

Coordinates: 28°40′26.24″N 77°07′54.59″E

Maharaja Agrasen Hospital is a hospital in New Delhi, India with 400 beds. It is located in West Punjabi Bagh.

The hospital is named after Maharaja Agrasen, a king of Agroha (Haryana).
