= Agrahari =

Family name

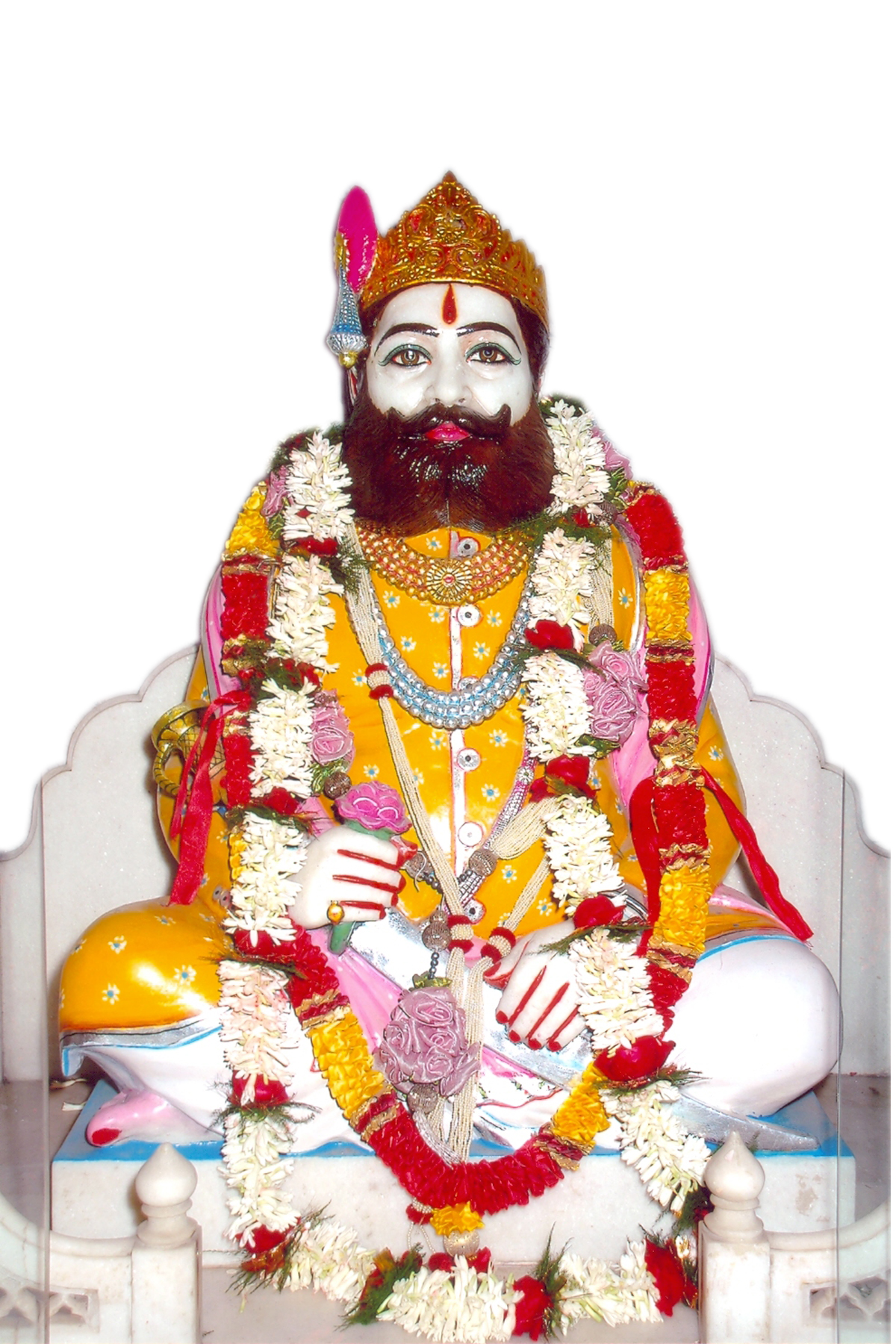
Maharaja Agrasena from whom the Agraharis claim descent.

Agrahari, Agraharee or Agarhari is an Indian caste or community. They claim to be the descendants of legendary king Agrasena. Predominantly, they are found in the Indian states of Uttar Pradesh, Madhya Pradesh, Jharkhand, Bihar, Chhattisgarh, and the Terai region of Nepal.

== History ==
In 1916, Robert Vane Russell, an ethnologist of the British Raj period wrote, Agrahari, found chiefly Jubbulpore district and Raigarh State. Their name connected with the cities with Agra and Agroha.

William Crooke states that Agrahari claim partly a Brahmin and partly a kshatriya descent, and wear the sacred thread. Like that of the Agarwāla their name has been connected with the cities of Agra and Agroha. There is no doubt that they are closely connected with the Agarwālas.

In Chhattisgarh, Central Provinces of British India, some of few Agrahari were Malgujars/Zamindars. The ruler of Raigarh awarded the title Shaw to Agraharis. The title still continues.

== Agrahari Sikhs ==
Most of the Agraharis follow Hinduism, although some are Sikhs. The majority of Agrahari Sikhs are found in the Eastern Indian States of Bihar Jharkhand and West Bengal. Author Himadri Banerjee wrote in his book "The Other Sikhs: A View from Eastern India", that Agraharis converted to Sikhism during Mughal period by Guru Tegh Bahadur Ji, 9th Guru of the Sikhs. Mughal rulers were enforcing Hindus to convert to Islam, but Agraharis refused to convert to Islam and they accepted Khalsa Panth, led by Guru Tegh Bahadur Ji for protecting their life and religion. Other legend says that Agrahari Sikhs are a community of Ahom converts to Sikhism from the time of 9th Guru Tegh Bahadur Ji’s travel to Assam. They are also known as "Bihari Sikhs" having lived for centuries in Bihar. They are running several separate Gurudwaras in Bihar and West Bengal. The majority of these Sikhs are found in Sasaram, Gaya and Kolkata of Bihar and West Bengal. In Jharkhand they are found in Dumari Kalan and Kedli Chatti. They are also found in the Indian State of Uttar Pradesh. Agrahari Sikhs are of the non-Punjabi background.

== Surname, Gotra & title ==
Agrahari often use their community name as surname. However, many people use agravanshi, Singh,Shaw and,suryavanshi as their surname. They have a common gotra, the Kashyap.

== Reservation ==
The Mandal Commission designated the Agrahari's of Uttar Pradesh and other states as General, but Agrahari in Bihar and Jharkhand are designated as Other Backwards Class in the Indian caste system of positive discrimination.

== See also ==
- List of Agrahari people
- Agrasen Jayanti
- Agrahari Sikh
