= Maharaja Agrasen College =

College of the University of Delhi, India

Coordinates: 28.603193°N 77.321863°E

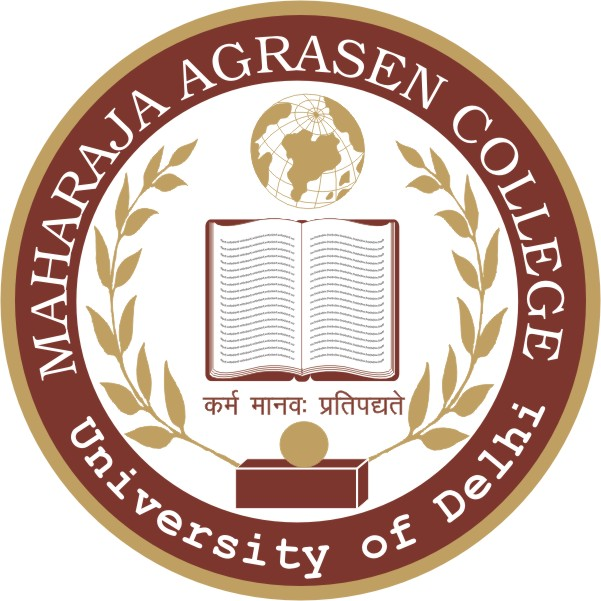
- Type: Public
- Established: 1994
- Academic affiliations: University of Delhi
- Principal: Prof. Sanjeev Kumari Tiwari
- Undergraduates: 2700 +
- Location: East Delhi, Delhi, India
- Campus: 10-acre (4.0 ha); Vasundhara Enclave 110096
- Website: mac.du.ac.in

Maharaja Agrasen College is a college of the University of Delhi, located in Vasundhara Enclave (East Delhi), Delhi.

== History ==
Maharaja Agrasen College was established in 1994 with the objective of catering to the educational requirements of a densely populated East Delhi. The college is fully funded by the Government of India. The college has now shifted to its building complex covering 10 acres (40,000 m^{2}) in Vasundhara Enclave, Delhi. It includes an auditorium, a computer centre, fully computerized library, laboratories, and a conference hall. The new building complex has acquired several new facilities like an Information and Communication Technology Center, a Language Laboratory, a Media Laboratory, an Indira Gandhi Open University Center, and a University Grants Commission Research Center among others. The college also provides residential facilities for girl students.

== Academics ==
=== Academic programs ===
The College offers admission to the following courses :

==== Undergraduate programs ====
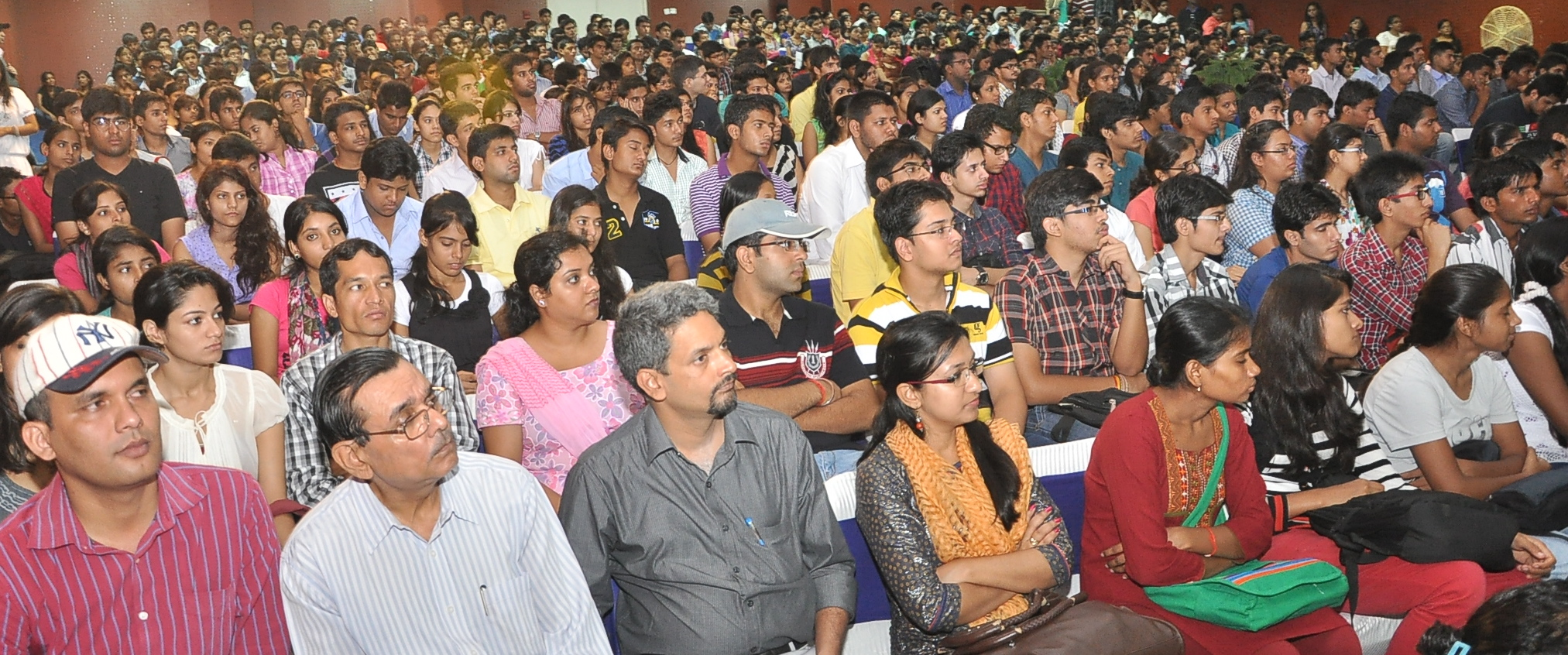
Maharaja Agrasen College

In 2013, Maharaja Agrasen College, as a constituent college of the University of Delhi, introduced a four-year undergraduate programme but in 2014, FYUP rolled back and Now College provides these Undergraduate Programs:

===== Bachelor of Arts (B.A.) =====
- Bachelor's in Business Economics
- Bachelor's of Arts (Programme)
- Bachelor's in Journalism
- Bachelor's in Hindi
- Bachelor's in Economics
- Bachelor's in English
- Bachelor's in Political Science

===== Bachelor of Science (B.Sc) =====
- Bachelor's with Mathematical science
- Bachelor's with Physical Science in Computer Science and chemistry

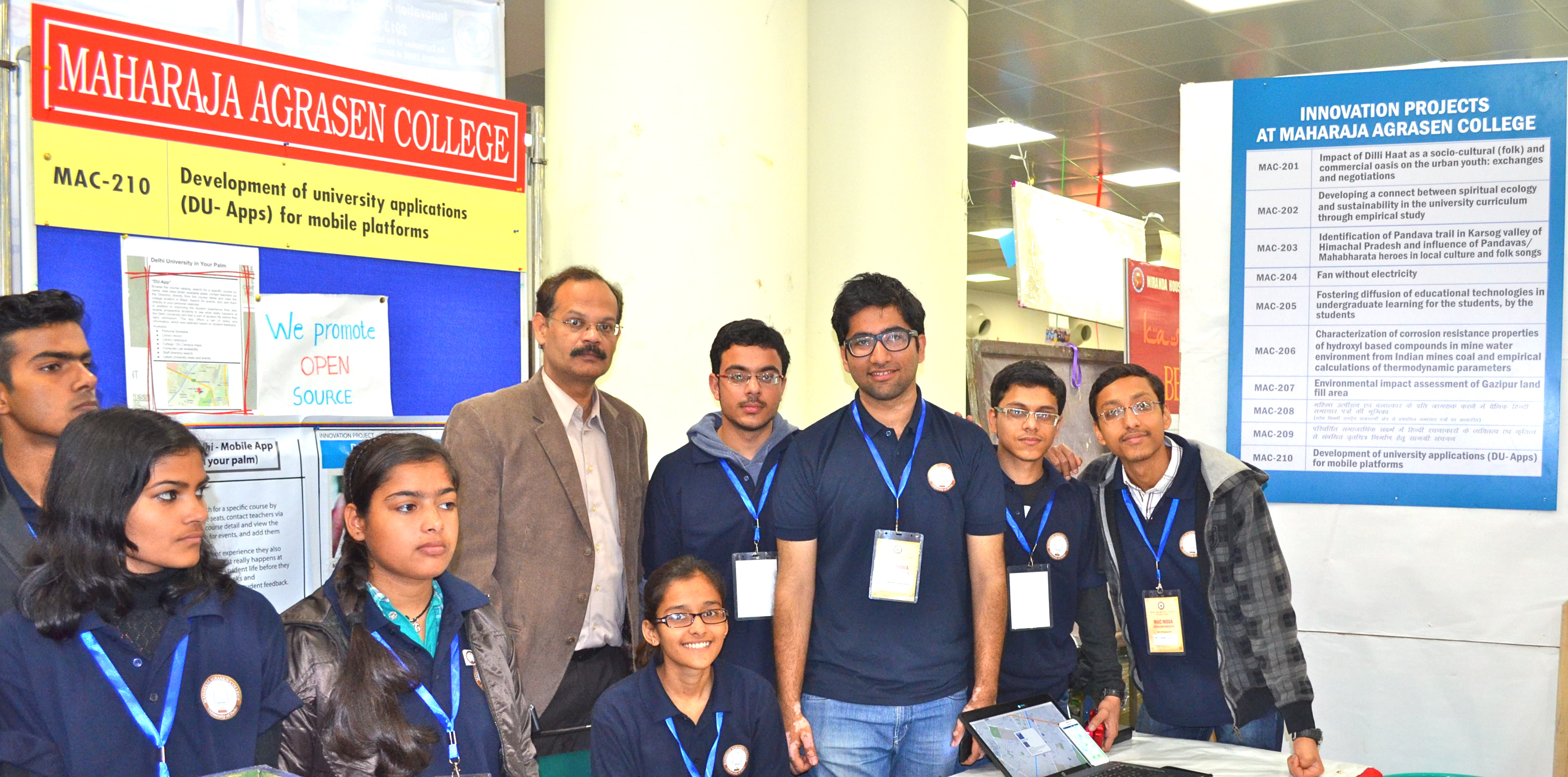
MACNOVA PROJECTS

===== Bachelor of Commerce (B.Com) =====
- Bachelor's with Honors in Commerce

===== Bachelor of Technology (B.Tech) AICTE Approved =====
[Formerly till 2014, currently not available]

- Bachelor's of Technology in Computer Science [Formerly till 2014, currently not available]
- Bachelor's of Technology in Electronics [Formerly till 2014, currently not available]

=== Rankings ===
The college is ranked 86th among colleges in India by the National Institutional Ranking Framework (NIRF) in 2024.

University rankings

General – India
- NIRF (Colleges) (2024): 86

=== Publications ===
- Indian Journal of Social Enquiry is the quarterly interdisciplinary journal of the college
- Agranika is the annual magazine of the college
- Macroscope is the monthly newsletter of the Dept. of Journalism of the college
- Agrasar is the magazine of NSS unit at Maharaja Agrasen College
- BEAM is the magazine of business economics and management studies department of college

== Notable alumni ==
- Shanky Singh, Professional wrestler
- Varun Singh Bhati, Para high jumper
- Geetanjali Babbar, founder and director of Kat-Katha organization
- Gaurav Kapoor, Stand Up comedian
- Medha Shankr, Actress
