= Vaishya =

One of the four classes of the Hindu varna system

Vaishya (Sanskrit: वैश्य, vaiśya) is one of the four varnas of the Vedic Hindu social order in India. Vaishyas are classed third in the order of Varna hierarchy.

The occupation of Vaishyas consists mainly of agriculture, taking care of cattle, trade and other business pursuits as mentioned in the Bhagavad Gita.

== Traditional duties ==
Hindu religious texts assigned Vaishyas to traditional roles in agriculture and cattle-rearing, but over time they came to be landowners, traders and money-lenders. They ranked third in the varna system below Brahmins and Kshatriyas and traditionally had the responsibility to provide sustenance or patronage for the higher varnas. The Vaishyas, along with members of the Brahmin and Kshatriya varnas, claim dvija status ("twice born", a second or spiritual birth) after sacrament of initiation as in Hindu theology. Indian traders were widely credited for the spread of Indian culture to regions as far as southeast Asia.

Historically, Vaishyas have been involved in roles other than their traditional pastoralism, trade and commerce. According to historian Ram Sharan Sharma, the Gupta Empire was a Vaishya dynasty that "may have appeared as a reaction against oppressive rulers".

Many Vaishyas are vegetarian due to the influence of Jainism and Buddhism which preaches the concept of ahimsa which forbade killing of animals for food.

== See also ==
- Bania (caste)
- Agrahari
- Lohana
