= Narsingpura =

- city
- Location in Rajasthan, India Narsingpura (India)
- Coordinates: 24.10°N 73.40°E
- Country: India
- State: Rajasthan
- District: Udaipur

Population (2001)
  - Total: 8,023

Languages
  - Official: Hindi
- Time zone: UTC+5:30 (IST)

Narsingpura is one of the Jain communities. It originated from the Mewar (Rajasthan) region. Many of them have migrated to Gujarat, MP, and recently to Maharashtra.

Narsingpura community follows Digambar Jain sect. According to tradition, it was founded by Acharya Ramasena who belonged to Kashtha Sangh order, at a town called Narsingpura Patan of Mewad, now Lunada in Dist Udaipur.

The last Bhattaraka of the Kashtha Sangh Naditat Gaccha at Pratapgarh was Bhattarak Yashkirtijee Maharaj ordained in Samvat 1974. His disciples Pandit Raamchandraji and Daadamchandji have compiled the historical account of the community. They follow the Bispanth traditions.

They have an organization All India Narsingpura Mahasabha. Kesariaji tirtha is of special significance to this community.

== See also ==
- Kashtha Sangh
- Mula Sangh
- Keshariaji
- Digambara Terapanth
- Humad
