= Taran Svami =

Jain monk and religious teacher

Personal life
- Born: c. 15th century CE Central India
- Died: c. 16th century CE Central India

Religious life
- Religion: Jainism
- Sect: Digambar

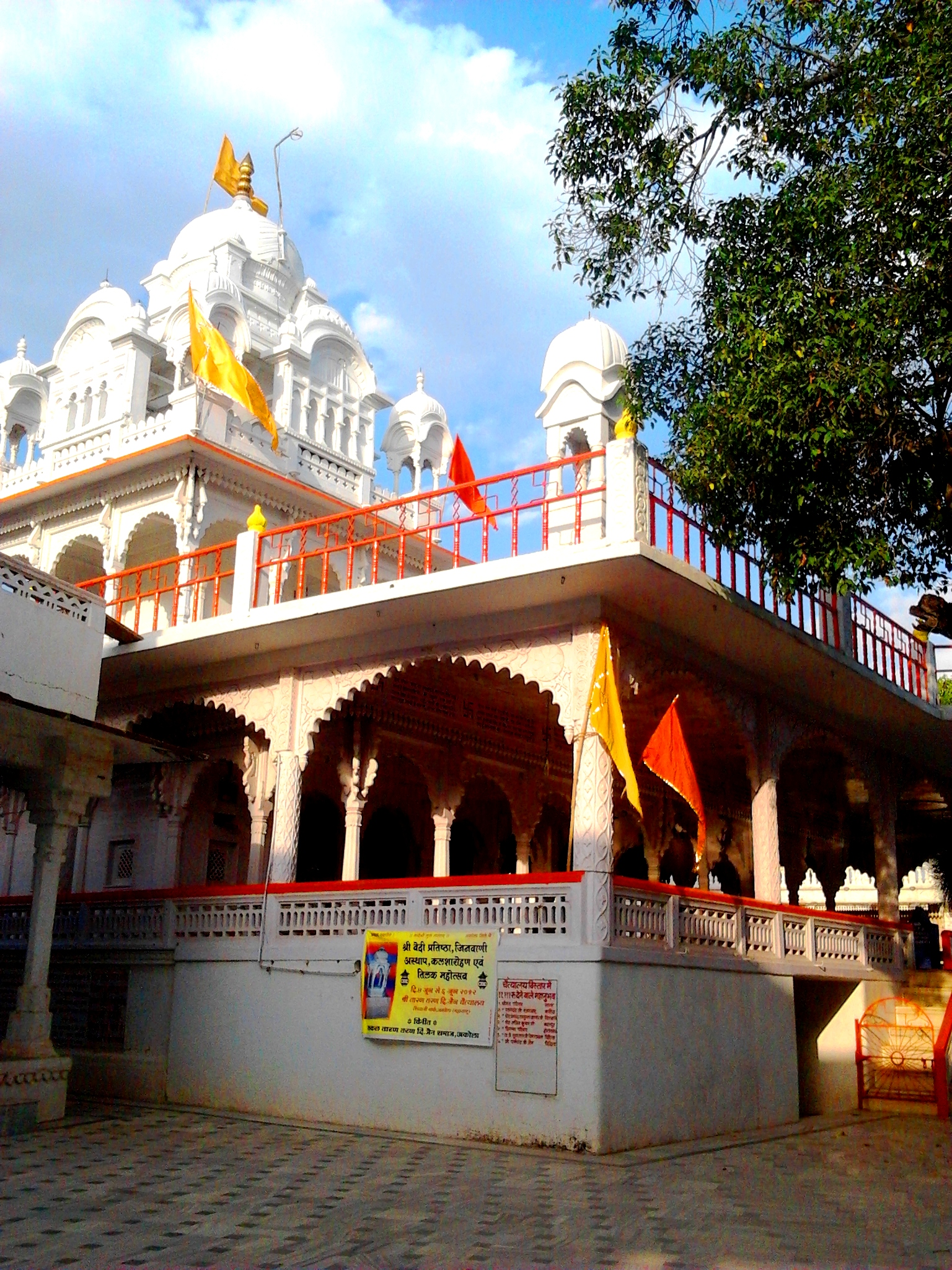
Nisaiji; Samadhi of Taran Svami, built by Tarachand Mallusav, 1817

Taran Svami, also spelled Taranswami, was a Jain monk and religious teacher of the Digambar Jainism, and the spiritual leader of the Taran Samaj. He lived in the 15th century central India. The traditional biographies consider him a ritual reformer for rejecting the authority of Bhattarakas and his emphasis on aniconism and inner realization. He was celibate (ब्रह्मचारी) and was initiated as a Digambar monk in his later life. He is credited for writing fourteen texts.

== Biographies ==
There is no scholarly biography of Taran Svami available. Taran Svami was celibate who got initiated as Digambar monk in his later life.

Biography by Phulcandra (1933)

Digambara Terapanthi scholar Pandit Phulcandra Siddhanta Shastri wrote a biography in 1933 based on his studies but is not accepted as scholarly biography.

Phulcandra has argued that the full name of Taran Svami, as used in the texts attributed to him, was Jin Taran Taran, literally "Jina Deliverer Deliverance." He also argued that the name indicates that he had liberated himself and can liberate others. The Thikanesara ("The essence of what is authentic") texts address him as Svamiji, "Reverend Master." He is commonly referred to as Taran Svami. There are no record of his birth name.

The Chadmastha Vani, a composition attributed to Taran Svami, records that he died on 7th Dark Half of Jyeshtha month in Vikram Samvat 1572 which corresponds to 5 May 1515 CE. Based on various manuscripts of Thikanesara and Nirvana Hundi (copied in late 19th and early 20th century), Phulcandra calculated that he was born on 7th Bright Half of Agahan month in Vikram Samvat 1505 which corresponds to 2 December 1448. Based on these texts, it is learned that Virasiri/Virashri was his mother and Garha Saha/Gudha Sahu was his father. He was born in Pushpavati village and into the Parvar caste, in the Vasalla gotra (clan) and Gaha mur (lineage). The village is identified with Bilhari near Katni in Jabalpur district, Madhya Pradesh, India by the followers and most authors.

An obscure passage of Chadmastha Vani is interpreted by Phulcandra, as accepted by the followers, which states that he started his studies when he was 11 years old and continued for ten years. He spent next nine years in spiritual practises and took vrata (lay vows) and became a celibate (Brahmachari) when he was 30 years old. He became a monk when he was sixty and died when sixty-six and half years old.

Phulcandra extrapolated the biography based on the history of medieval Jain Digambaras and the oral tradition of the followers. Phulcandra constructed that Taran Svami was taken to Garaula (or Garhaula), the village of his maternal uncle by his father when he was five years old. He was handed over to Bhattaraka Devendrakirti, heading the Canderi seat. Devendrakirti was the guru of the Parvar caste. He began studies under him. Shrutakirti, the author of Harivamsa Purana in 1495 CE, was either his fellow student or his teacher. At the age 21, he left his studies and went to Semarkheri, near Siroñj in Vidisha district where his maternal uncle lived. He spent another nine years there meditating and in religious practices. He overcame three spiritual obstacles, mithyatva (spiritual ignorance), maya (illusion) and nidana (seeking material benefit for religious practise) and took the vrata (vow) of a celibate (Brahmachari) at the age of thirty. Thus he is considered a partial renouncer. He continued his religious practise for another thirty years. He became a monk at the age of sixty on his own. He lived as a monk for more six-and-a-half years.

Biography by Nathuram Premi (1912–13)

Digambar scholar Nathuram Premi published a multi-part article in Jain Hitaisi, a Hindi language journal published from Bombay (now Mumbai) in 1912 and 1913. It was based on the oral tradition of other Digambara Jains of Bundelkhand and an unnamed "old book" given to him by a follower of Taran Svami. His biography proved controversial as it chiefly focused on his opposition to image-worship, his tales of use of magic and his Muslim followers. In subsequent part of the article, he defines him as a future Tirthankara. He connects him with king Shrenik, Bhadrabahu, Kundakunda as his past lives. He places his birth in Pohapavati (Puspavati), a village near Delhi. He also states that his father worked in the court of an unnamed Muslim king. He stated that his second part is also based on the oral tradition. He further adds that his version unlikely as there were no historical presence of Parvars in Delhi and the lack of the name of the king.

Biography by Brahmachari Sitalprasad (1932)

Digambar scholar Brahmachari Sitalprasad wrote a short biography in the introduction to his Modern Hindi rendition of Taran Svami's Shravakachara in 1932. It was based on the oral tradition of the followers in Sagar and the article of Premi.

According to him, Taran Svami was born at Puspavati; identified with Peshavar, a village near Delhi. His father was a wealthy merchant and worked for the Lodhi kings. He moved to Garaula, a village in Sagar district due to unknown reason. A Digambara monk suggested Taran Svami should study scriptures based on his body marks. So his father moved to Semarkheri where Taran Svami joined studies. Taran Svami never married and continued to his interest in religious practices and meditation for years. He finally left home and became a celibate or a monk. He settled in Malhargarh, a village now in Guna district. He travelled and preached there for years. Sitalprasad states that he converted 553,319 people to Jainism.

Biography by Kaluram Jain (1941)

In 1941, Kaluram Jain of Semarkheri published a biography based on Premi's article, contemporary oral tradition and an unnamed hand-written manuscript. He cited the lack of prior research and stated that his short biography is just a discussion on of Taran Svami's life as well as on the development of the Taran Panth. He also asked for more research in these aspects.

Other late biographies

Jaysagar (1990) has stated in his biography that Taran Svami must have been Mandalacharya based on Nama Mala but is considered unlikely as the title is used by Bhattarakas. He further stated that he had 1,100,000 direct followers and 4,200,000 had accepted his teachings. These figures are considered imaginative.

Brahmachari Jñananand, a modern Taran Panthi wrote a biography Taran Jivan Jyoti which is criticised for imaginative additions and contrary to tradition. Its publication was stopped in 1999. Brahmachari Basant, a collaborator of Jñananand, has stated that Taran Svami was a Mandalacharya heading 151 Mandalas. He also states that he had seven monks (Hemanandi, Candragupta, Samantabhadra, Citragupta, Samadhigupta, Jayakirti, and Bhuvananda), 35 nuns, 231 Brahmacharini (female celibates), 60 Brahmachari (males celibates) and large number of laity totaling of 4,345,331 followers. These figures are also considered imaginative.

=== Evaluation of biographies ===
Phulcandra and Sitalprasad's biographies frame Taran Svami within Digambara mystic tradition in continuum of Umaswati and Kundakunda. It is dominant narrative within the community. It also bridges Taran Svami's teaching with Digambara Terapanth. Taran Svami is also seen as a ritual reformer who rejected the authority of Bhattarakas and the necessity of rituals. Instead his teaching put emphasis on study of texts such as of Kundakunda and practise of meditation and other religious exercises. He is also sometime put together with other saints of Bhakti Movement such as Kabir who rejected outer rituals and emphasized on inner realization. His teachings emphasized on aniconism and indifference to idol worship which is also seen in earlier Digambara mystic tradition also. These biographies places him within the Jain spiritual framework. Only Premi's writing place him as a future Tirthankara.

Legends of miracles

These biographies also describes several magical incidents associated with him and his followers and even extending to his memorials. On such popular narrative is that, at Malhargadh, he was drowned in Betwa River three times by a boatman but he was miraculously saved each time. It was done in opposition to his teaching. It is also said that he can travel between places in minutes by powers. It is said that he used to attract people at fairs and later convert them to his teaching. One such magic included suspending texts in the air and then bringing them back to the earth. One story says that he had brought back burnt papers of his father, who working for the king, when he was a boy. He is also associated with jugglers (nat).

At Semarkheri, it is said that Taran Svami once met gypsies (Banjara) who had caravan of camels loaded with sugar. When asked by Taran Svami, they lied that it is salt as they suspected him as a thief. Later they found that the sugar had indeed turned into salt. They asked for forgiveness and the salt again turned into sugar. They later sold it in the city and built the temple at Semarkheri where there is a pillar commemorating its construction.

It is said that Taran Svami had Muslim followers too. Lukman Shah and Ruiya Rama, both Muslim followers, still has memorial shrines near Nisaiji. Taran Svami had Hindu followers too. Near Nisaiji, there is shrine dedicated to two Bundela Rajput brothers who are worshiped by Hindus and said to have protected Taran Svami during his oppression. Some tales also connects them with their devotion to Taran Svami.

The contemporary understanding of Taran Svami mostly rejects these legends.

== Works ==
Taran Svami is credited with writing fourteen texts. Scholars have expressed doubts about his authorship of the Chadmastha Vani as it cites his death and of the Nama Mala as it contains names of his disciples. These texts are classified in five systems mentioned in one manuscript of Thikanesara (now at Khurai temple).

They are as follows:

- Vicara mata (Reflections)
  - Malarohana ("Garland offering")
  - Pandita Puja ("Wise worship")
  - Kamala Battisi ("Lotus thirty-two [verses]")
- Acara mata (Conduct)
  - Shravakacara ("Lay conduct")
- Sara mata (Essential teachings)
  - Jñana Samuccaya Sara ("Collected essence of knowledge")
  - Tribhakgi Sara ("Essence in triads")
  - Upadesha Shuddha Sara ("Pure essence of the teachings")
- Mamala mata (Spiritual purity)
  - Mamala Pahuda ("Handbook on purity")
  - Caubisa Thana ("Twenty-four topics")
- Kevala mata (Enlightenment)
  - Chadmastha Vani ("Sayings of the unliberated")
  - Nama Mala ("Garland of names")
  - Khatika Vishesa ("Special uprooter")
  - Siddha Subhava ("Nature of the perfected soul")
  - Sunna Subhava ("Nature of emptiness")
