= Kesarwani =

Bania sub-caste originating in the Kashmir Valley

The Kesarwani, also known as Kesarvani, Keshri, Keshari or Kesri, are a Bania sub-caste found in India. They originated in the Kashmir region and are now found in other parts of northern India, to which they migrated during the Mughal era. In older books, they are referred to as "Kasarvani" Kesar refers to saffron, which they traded, and Wani refers to the Kashmiri caste to which they belong.

== History and origin ==
The Kesarwani were cultivators or traders of saffron (kesar in Hindustani) and originated from the Kashmir Valley of India. In the 12th century, many of the Kesarwani migrated to what today comprise the states of Bihar, Madhya Pradesh and Uttar Pradesh.

It is said that, as per a carved-engraved stone, found from Kashmir and presently available at the Pakistan Museum, that a group of people belonging to Kansal gotra of the Agrawal community from Punjab went to Kashmir in regard to Kesar trade and settled there. Gradually their population increased in the region and after the aforesaid incident, they migrated to Delhi and other parts of northern India. Considering this, Kesarwanis are nothing but Kansal-Gotri Agrawal Vaishy, who became Kesarwani because of their Kesar business in Kashmir. The Kesarwanis, also known as Keshri, are considered synonymous to Gupta/Agarwal/Garg.

== See also ==
- Vaishya
- Kashmiri Hindus
- Kansabanik
