= Lala Ratan Chand =

Raja Ratan Chand

Raja Ratan Chand (1665–1720) became the diwan of Mughal emperor Farrukhsiyar (1713–1719) in 1712, who gave him the title of Raja. He came to be regarded as a very effective administrator.

He was associated with the Saiyid Brothers, and was the brain behind the kingmaker team. He came to be trusted with the financial affairs of the state by Abdullah. He was even entrusted with appointment of kazis. Jazia tax imposed on the Non-Muslims was abolished due to his efforts. His influence was resented by some of the Muslim nobles. He became involved in the court intrigues.

Although Sayyid brothers are referred to as the Kingmakers but this is not the right statement in the history. Sayyid brothers with Raja Ratan Chand as a team were Kingmakers. Raja Ratan Chand represented wisdom in the team and Sayyid brothers represented valor. Many Agrawals did not like his progressive attitude; therefore, he and his group of Agrawals separated and formed the “Raja ki Biradari” section of the Agrawals, which later can be known as Rajvanshi.
