= Taran Panth =

Sect of Digambara Jainism

Founder
- Taran Svami

Regions with significant populations
- Central India

20,000-100,000

Religions
- Digambar Jainism

Scriptures
- see Texts

Website
- www.taranpanth.com

The Taran Panth, also known as Taran Svami Panth, Taran Samaj or Taranapanthi, is a sect of Digambara Jainism founded by Taran Svami in Bundelkhand in central India in c. 1505 CE.

== Taran Svami ==
Taran Svami was a Jain religious teacher and founder of the Taran Panth. He lived in the 15th century central India. The traditional biographies places him within the Digambara mystic tradition. They also consider him a ritual reformer for rejecting the authority of Bhattarakas and his emphasis on aniconism and inner realization. He is credited with writing fourteen texts.

== Texts ==
The following fourteen texts are credited to Taran Svami. These texts are classified in five systems mentioned in one manuscript of Thikanesara (now at Khurai temple). Scholars have expressed doubts about his authorship of the Chadmastha Vani as it cites his death and of the Nama Mala as it contains names of his disciples. These texts are classified in five systems mentioned in one manuscript of Thikanesara (now at Khurai temple).

- Vicara mata (Reflections)
  - Malarohana ("Garland offering")
  - Pandita Puja ("Wise worship")
  - Kamala Battisi ("Lotus thirty-two [verses]")
- Acara mata (Conduct)
  - Shravakacara ("Lay conduct")
- Sara mata (Essential teachings)
  - Jñana Samuccaya Sara ("Collected essence of knowledge")
  - Tribhangi Sara ("Essence in triads")
  - Upadesha Shuddha Sara ("Pure essence of the teachings")
- Mamala mata (Spiritual purity)
  - Mamala Pahuda ("Handbook on purity")
  - Caubisa Thana ("Twenty-four topics")
- Kevala mata (Enlightenment)
  - Chadmastha Vani ("Sayings of the unliberated")
  - Nama Mala ("Garland of names")
  - Khatika Vishesa ("Special uprooter")
  - Siddha Subhava ("Nature of the perfected soul")
  - Sunna Subhava ("Nature of emptiness")

The three texts in the Vicara mata category are thirty-two verse compositions. They are the most popular texts of Taran Svami. Malarohana was composed for the marriage of Taran Svami's followers, according to the tradition. It is still read during marriage of the followers. Premi had said that during Daslakshana, the followers gather in the temple and recite Pandita Puja and Mamalapahuda in day and Malarohana and Kamala Battisi at night. K. Samaiya had equated them with Ratnatraya. Some members recite some of these texts daily.

Other texts are not well-known. Sravakacara has 462 verses which defines code of conduct for lay followers which draws from earlier Digambara text Ratnakaranda śrāvakācāra. The Jñana Samuccaya Sara has 908 verses, and the Upadesha Shuddha Sara has 588 verses. These two texts discuss the Digambara philosophy and metaphysics. The Jñana Samuccaya Sara discusses Ratnatraya, scriptures, the stages of lay spirituality, Anuvrata and Mahavrata, seven types of Jain philosophy, Dravya, Dhyana etc. The Upadesha Shuddha Sara discusses the path of liberation and its hurdles. The Tribhangi Sara has 71 verses which discusses the topics in triads. These four texts are close to the Digambara tradition of philosophy.

The Mamala Pahuda is a collection of songs. It has more than 3,200 verses. The Caubisa Thana discusses 24 topics of spirituality to gain liberation. It is mix of prose and verse and about 20 pages in total.

The Chadmastha Vani and Nama Mala are short prose texts about nine pages. It has information on Taran Svami and his followers and other subjects. Premi had said that Chadmastha Vani is recited by followers for five days after Diwali. The Khatika Vishesa discusses about Karma in context of the cycle of time. It is mix of prose and verse. The Siddha Subhava and Sunna Subhava are short prose. The Siddha Subhava discusses the purification of soul while the Sunna Subhav discusses ways of destroying ego.

Commentaries on six of the main texts composed by Taran Svami were written by Brahmacari Shitala Prasad in the 1930s. Commentaries on other texts have also been done recently. Osho (Rajnish), who was born into a Taranpanthi family, has included Sunna Subhava and Siddhi Subhava as among the books that influenced him most.

== History ==
After death of Taran Svami, the history of the sect is unclear. The Nam Mala contains around 2000 names but its significance is unclear. Based on oral traditions, Taran Svami had disciples from varied classes and castes. His disciples were from Jain as well from non-Jain background. Some of his disciples had Muslim background. No scholarly study has constructed the early history of Taran Panth due to clear lack of literary tradition. The religious profession is also unclear in the sect. There were some associated with Nisaiji temples. There are no monks in the sect but they had some lay celibates (Brahmachari and Brahmacharinis).

Today a large number of the followers of Taran Panth come from six merchant castes of Bundelkhand region of Madhya Pradesh. Three of these – Samaiya, Dosakhe and Gulalare – were converts from Murtipujaka Jain communities, and the other three – Asethi, Ayodhyavasi and Carnagar – were converts from Vaishnava Hindu communities as informed to Jain scholar Cort. The total number of the followers of the Taran Panth range from 20,000 to 100,000. R. Samaiya had listed 131 temples and the number of followers just under 20,000 in 1989. Majority of the followers reside in Madhya Pradesh and some in south Uttar Pradesh and northwest Maharashtra.

== Pilgrimage sites and temples ==
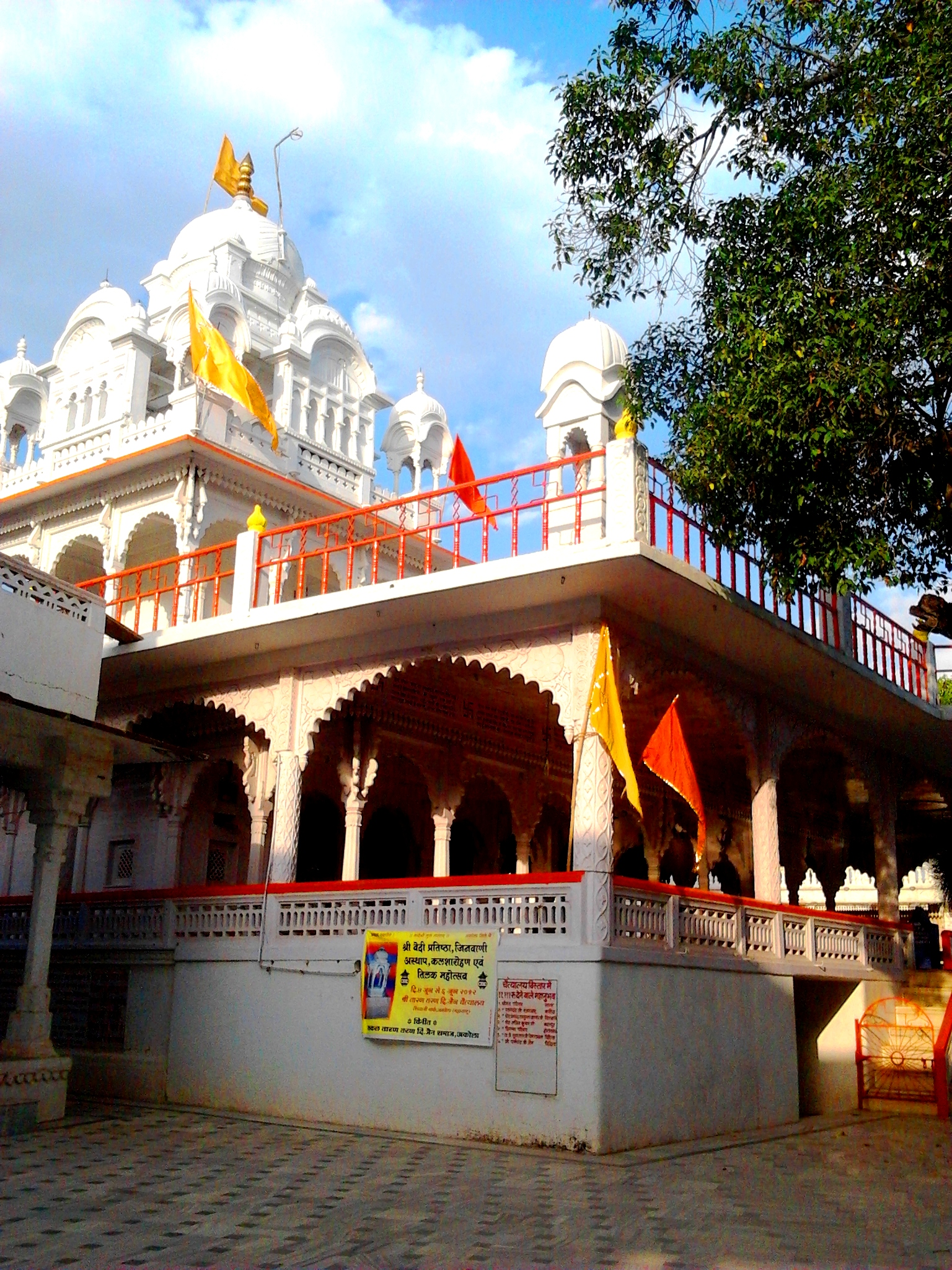
Nisaiji, built by Tarachand Mallusav, 1817.

Taranpanthi shrines are called Chaityalaya (or sometimes Nisai/Nasia). At the altar (vimana) they have a book instead of an idol. The most important site is located in Malhargadh village in Guna district where Taran Svami spent his final years and where his last rites were performed. The shrine known as Nisaiji ("Honoured Memorial") is on the banks of the Betwa river. The three-days annual fair known as Phag Phulna ("Phag Flowering") is orhanised from Falgun Bright Fifth. In the past, there was an annual fair organised in honour of one of his Muslim disciple Ruiya Raman or Ruiya Jin but it is discontinued. Many followers visit here for Chudakarana ritual of their children. The shrine has stone windows and high canopies built in "late medieval Rajput" style. The style became standard for other shrines. The history of the site is written by Phulchandra who says that the shrine was initially just a chhatri (canopy). In 1817, Taracand Mallusav, a merchant from Nagpur rebuilt the shrine in its current form, the platform with twelve doors and several canopies. He had sponsored the annual fair and one of his family member, Kesaridau, died here. The shrine is simple and has a central marble altar which houses a pile of printed books. Behind it, there is an older stone altar which is considered the original one. There are a records of patrons of fair from 1817. Since 1933, the fair is organised by the community. There are no images due to Taran Svami's emphasis on aniconism. There are three stone platforms in the Betwa river associated with events in his life.

Semarkheri located near Sironj in Vidisha district has a shrine built by Banjaras. Here he spent some time engaging in spiritual activities. The annual fair is organised on Vasant Panchami. It is oldest shrine after Nisaiji and has records of the patrons of the fair dating back to 1881. Sukha near Pathariya village in Damoh district where Taran Svami preached. The old site was in dilapidated condition before the new constructions started in 1938. The annual fair is organised on Agahan Bright Seventh (November–December). The day of fair known as Taran Jayanti and is of recent origin. The shrine at Bilhari village near Katni in Jabalpur district is associated with birth of Taran Svami. The site became focus of community only recently and no annual fair is organised here.

There is a memorial dedicated to Himau Pande, one of Taran Svami's chief disciple at Chand village in Chhindwara district. The site only recently became a focus of development by local followers. There was only large platform in the past but now a large temple is built. The annual fair is organised on Jeth Dark Sixth, known as Samadhi Sixth, the death anniversary of Himau Pande.

There is also a large platform at Garaula (or Garhaula), near Tindua in Damoh district which is associated with Taran Svami's childhood days at his maternal uncle's house.

The temples are fairly simple in design with open spaces and least ornamentation. The marble altars in temple has symbols associated with generalized auspiciousness. Due to aniconic emphasis, there are no images placed in the temples. Sometimes the altar has books of Taran Svami and of other writers from Digambara mystic and philosophical traditions.

== Rituals and practices ==
The order of the services were organised by Jayasagar in the mid-twentieth century.

The temple rituals are as follows: The follower enters the temple and bows to the altar as the sign of respect then recites three verses drawn from Taran Svami's texts known as Tatva Patha or Tatva Mangal in front of the altar. This is followed by singing Bhajans or hymns. If there is a sermon, bhaiji or pande, a local intellectual associated with temple or other intellectuals known as pundit will deliver sermons to seated followers. The sermon ends with everyone standing and singing a hymn known as Abalabali. The ritual ends with the Arati. The Arati has two parts; the first one is dedicated to Dev (God), Guru (teacher) and scriptures while the other part is dedicated to Taran Svami.
