= Kuchchal =

Kuchchal also spelled Kuchhal is an Indian clan of the Agrawal community. Agrasen established 18 gotras (clans) for each of his 18 ganadhipati naming them after their Guru and divided his empire among them.

== See also ==
- Agrahari
- Kesharwani
