= Rishabhdeo =

Rishabhdeo Rikhabdeo
- town
- Location in Rajasthan, India
- Coordinates: 24.076956°N 73.693617°E
- Country: India
- State: Rajasthan
- District: Udaipur

Population (2011)
  - Total: 9,171

Languages
  - Official: Hindi
- Time zone: UTC+5:30 (IST)
- PIN: 313802
- Telephone code: 02907

Rikhabdeo ( Rishabhadeo) is a town in Udaipur district in the state of Rajasthan, in north-west India.

Rishabhadeo is situated 65 kilometres (40 mi) from Udaipur and is on Udaipur-Ahmedabad Road. The name of the town is also Dhulev The place got its name from a Bhil chieftain named Dhuleva who guarded the temple of Lord Rishabhdev., however it is better known as Rishabhadeo. It is a well-known pilgrimage site for the temple Kesariyaji Tirth (a. k. a. the "Main Temple"). Kesariyaji Tirth or Rishabhdeo Jain temple is a Jain temple located in Rishabhdeo town of Udaipur District of Indian state of Rajasthan. The temple is considered an important pilgrimage center by both Digambara and Śvētāmbara sect of Jainism. Further, Rajasthan High Court, in its judgment dated 30 March 1966, stated that it was, indisputably, a Śvētāmbara Jain temple. Lord Rishabhadeo is also "Kesariaji" because a large offering of saffron (keshar, a common ingredient) is made to the deity.

This temple was considered to be one of the four main religious institutions of Mewar, ruled by the Sisodia Maharanas of Udaipur, as stated by Chatur Singhji Bavji:

"Ekling Girirajdhar Rishabdev Bhujchaar
Sumaron Sada Sneh so, Chaar Dham Mewar"

It has been a famous Jain pilgrimage center. The famous Svetambara Jain Arati by Mulchand refers to this temple:

"Dusari Aarti Din Dayala,
Dhuleva Nagarman Jug Ujavala"

== Economy ==
The region has more than 200 mines of green marble. Rishabhdeo is the largest miner of green marble.9 0 per-cent of green marble in the world is produced in Rishabhdev. The turnover of marble industry is more than 500 crore. It also give employment to many labourers. Beyond this the town also has spinning and weaving mill by lnjBhilwara group. Thus it gives employment to 10000 local workers. The presence of temple also leads to income of many people. There are many shops near temple that sold Puja samagri.

== Educational institutions ==
There are several school and colleges in the region Govt.sr.sec.school, Govt.sr.sec.girls school, Mahaveer public school, Vivekananda Kendra vidyalaya, Eden international school, Vidhya Niketan, Classic public school, J.R Sharma mahavidyala,

== Rathotsav ==
After the end of paryushana parva rathotsav is celebrated in the town. This festival is celebrated as the marriage of lord neminath. Men wear white cloths and women wears chundad. People play Dandiya and garba. The main attraction of the rathotsav is 800 years old raths. The festival is celebrated for two days and ends up with march past of dhulev jawans.

== Main Temple ==
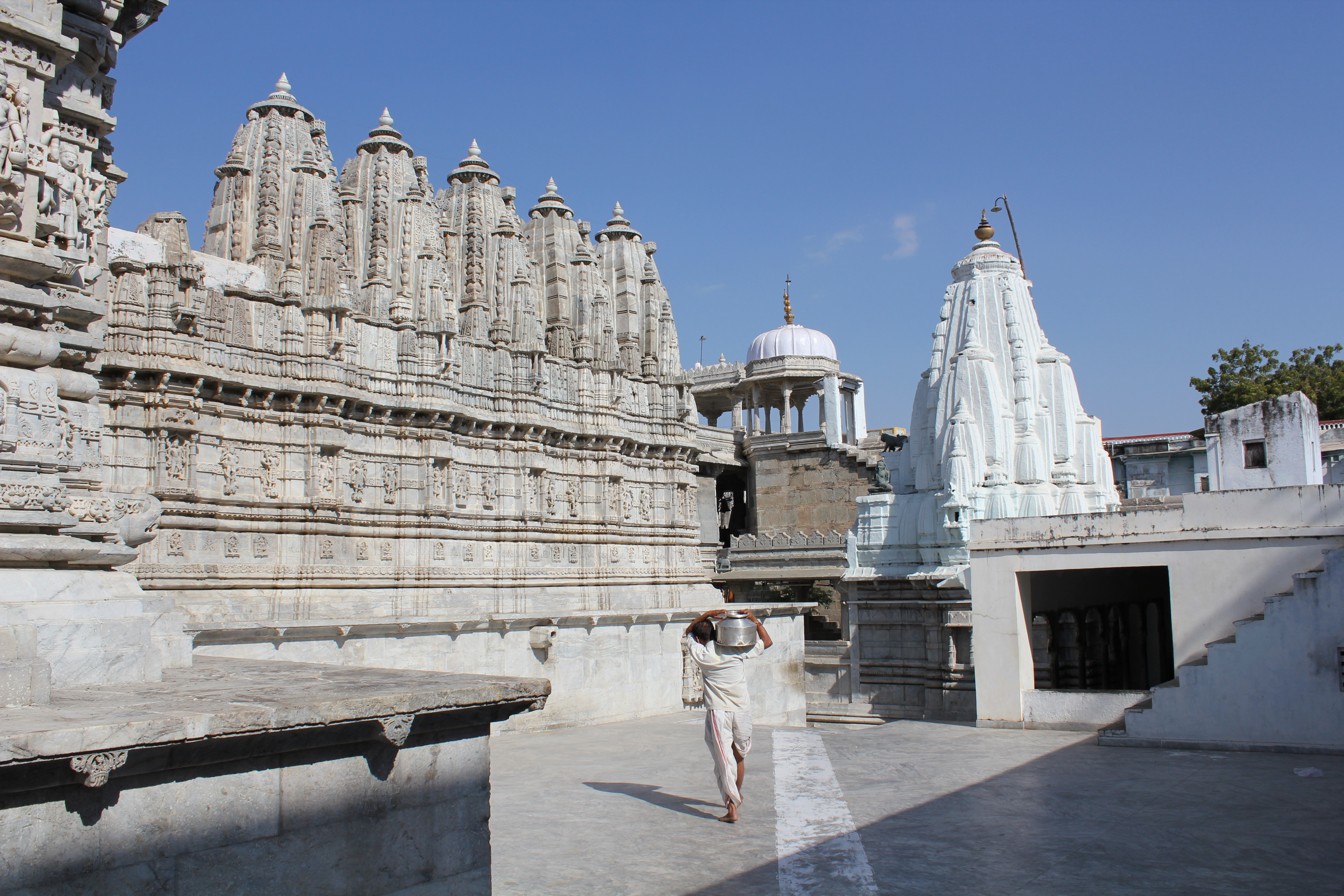
Kesariyaji Tirth

The temple is dedicated to Lord Rishabh dev. The main temple Atishaya Teerth Kshetra Rishabhanatha has fifty-two detailed spires, which are observable from a long distance, and believed to be built in 8th century. According to Jain's opinion, as a symbol of Nandishwar Dweep's fifty-two temples, this temple was constructed having fifty-two spires. This temple is constructed scientifically according to the art of architecture.

Just before the courtyard and in front of the main temple, there is an idol of Marudevi Mata (the mother of Lord Rikhabdev) seated on a marble elephant.

=== Construction style ===
The first gate of the temple in the form of Vaikarakhana. The square of outer orbits comes from the temple of Dakshar Khel. It is also there on the other entrance. There is an elephant of black stone standing at both the doors. Aahwankund near the elephant On the north side, where Durga is worshiped in the days of Navratri, one of the two sides of the upper door is Brahma and the other is Shiva idol. There is an arrangement for going to this temple through the stairs. There is a statue of Marudevi sitting on the middle of the middle of the pavilion above the sidewalk. The platform of Lord Bhagwad Gita is made on the left side ahead of the stairs, where the story of Bhagwat is in chaos. Due to 9 columns, it is known as the nine-poster. From here the third gate is entered. Webpage:ऋषभदेव मन्दिर उदयपुर - भारतकोश, ज्ञान का हिन्दी महासागर

=== The main idols in the temple ===
The main idol in the temple is of Tirthankara Rishabha, carved in black stone in padmasana posture, about 3.5 feet (1.1 m) tall. Two oxen are carved in the center of the simhasana (platform) of the main idol, which also has 16 dreams of the mother of Tirthankar. Surrounding the main deity, there are 23 idols, 2 standing and 21 seated, in an ashtadhatu (composed of eight metals) parikar. Here, pilgrims are bound to be lost in unstinted devotion; both Jain and non-Jain visitors and pilgrims experience a sort of sacredness, thanks due to the simply indescribable aura of the image of Shri Prabhu. The whole temple, with the main inner apartment, the deep pandal, nine chowkis, the assembly pandal, the Bhamati, the small shrines of gods, the Shrungara chowki, the peak and the encircling fort is simply majestic. Even from a distance, the gorgeous 52 Jinalayas can enrapture the viewer. In the north and south sides of the Khela Mandapa of the temple, idols of Tirthankaras Vasupujya, Mallinath, Neminath, Parshvanath and Mahavir Swami (collectively referred to as Panch-Balayati) are installed.

There are 52 secondary ornate shrines (devakulikas) of the Tirthankaras.

Elephants carved of black stone stand at the entrance of the temple. On the north is the image of Goddess Chakreshvari, and on the southern side is an image of goddess Padmavati.

The temple have 1100 pillars and every pillar have different art.

All Hindu castes and Jain sects have been offering prayers here since a long time ago, the management of the temple is done by the state Government.

=== History ===
The history of the temple is not known clearly. Different communities put their own version of it. There are many beliefs regarding the antiquity and history of this splendid, miraculous and extraordinary idol. It was very much worshipped in the times Bhagawan Munisuvrat Swami. In course of time, it appeared under a banyan tree outside Vatpradnagar. It was worshipped for some years. Again it appeared under a tree at distance of one kilometer from the village. This is the Chief Tirth of Jains in the Mewar State. A fair is held here every year on the eighth day of the dark half of the month of Fagan. With all the five fingers, people worship God here with saffron. They give a gift of saffron to God. Bhils, know God by the name of 'Kalababa'. Non - Jain devotees come here with faith. Since centuries, there is a custom of giving saffron to God as a gift. Sometimes so much saffron is plastered on God, that God looks saffron - colored. People, therefore, call God Kesariyanath.

=== The temple and the Maharanas of Udaipur ===
Udaipur became the capital of the Sisodias in 1559. The revival of the fortunes of the Sisodias was made possible by the Jain ministers, like Bhamashah, who provided funds to reestablish the Maharanas after they had to leave Chittor. Because of significant Jain influence, the Maharanas became devotees of Lord Rishabh and worshipped here. They also made gifts to the temple.

Maharana Fateh Singh (1884–1930) presented a jewel-studded angi (coat) to the temple which is used on special occasions costing one hundred thousand rupees.

The administration was handed over to the government after India's independence.

=== The temple dispute ===
The nature of the temple has been in issue between Digambara, Swetambers and other Hindus. Rajasthan High Court, in its judgment dated 30 March 1966, stated that it was, indisputably, a Śvētāmbara Jain temple. The Supreme Court of India in its judgment delivered in 'The State of Rajasthan & Ors. Vs. Shri Sajjanlal Panjawat & Ors.' [reported as (1974) 1 SCC 500] has, after considering the material produced, decided that it is a 'Jain temple' [see para. 12 at pg. 509/510 SCC]. However, since the right to manage the said temple had been taken over by the State of Mewar before promulgation of the Indian Constitution, therefore, Jains had no right to manage the temple after the Indian Constitution came into force. For that reason, it was held, that the Jains had no right to protect under Article 25/26 of the Indian Constitution. The issue of management of the said temple was again cropped up, and Digambars, Swetambars, Hindus and the State of Rajasthan again brought the matter in the Supreme Court of India, claiming to have the right to manage the temple. However, this time on the strength of 'Rajasthan Public Trust Act', which says that those temples to which chapter X of the said Act is applicable, would be managed by a Committee constituted from the persons interested in the management. That case was decided by a Bench of the Indian Supreme Court and Hon'ble Justice S.B. Sinha and Hon'ble Justice Markandey Katju vide in the judgment dated 4 January 2007, delivered in Civil Appeal No.4092-95 of 2002 titled as "Deewan Singh & Ors. vs. Rajendra Prasad ARdevi & Ors". Other connected Civil Appeals, confirmed the judgement of Single Judge (which was modified by the Division Bench of the Rajasthan High Court) and ordered that the management of the said temple be handed over to the committee, as envisaged under Section 53 of the 'Rajasthan Public Trust Act' within four months.

A 2007 Supreme Court decision to hand over the administration to the Jain community had led to protests and violence by the local tribals.

"The revenue earned by the temple was also perhaps the main issue behind the legal tangle and the current confrontation, in which tribal people have been used as cannon fodder. The temple complex lies on 378 hectares of land and houses a guest house as well. Its moveable property alone is said to be valued at about Rs. 510 million. It is estimated that on an average 2,000 devotees visit Rishabdeo every day.

"The temple's eight Brahmin priests share the bulk of the offerings.

"The priests insist that the management cannot be handed over to the Jain community. "Where will we go? The Maharanas of Mewar gave us the right to conduct prayers here. They also made valuable offerings to the god," says Bhogilal, a priest. "I won't let the mandir go either to the Devasthan or to the tribals," he says."

Gulabchand Kataria, the home minister of Rajasthan believes that the tribals were incited by some elements. Dainik Navjyoti had reported on 14 February 2007 that:

"Some members of the Jain community say that some leaders of the Vaishnava community are behind instigation of the tribals."

"The priests get a large fraction of all the offerings. Because of this self interest, the group of priests do not want the management to go to the Jains."

Bhaskar reported the anonymous pamphlets were distributed among the tribals to incite them. The violence had erupted on 7 February 2007, when several hundred tribals attacked the members of the Jain community and destroyed theirs shops, houses, cars, etc. The police were unable to contain the destruction after the use of tear gas and rubber bullets. One person was killed in the police firing.

There is pressure being put on the state government not to implement the Supreme Court decision. This has been causing alarm in the Jain community.

== Demographics ==
Rishabhdeo is a Census Town city in district of Udaipur, Rajasthan. The Rishabhdeo Census Town has population of 9,171 of which 4,769 are males while 4,402 are females as per report released by Census India 2011.

Population of children of age 0-6 is 1121 which is 12.22% of the total population. In Rishabhdeo Census Town, the female sex ratio is of 923 against a state average of 928. Moreover, the child sex ratio in Rishabhdeo is around 850 compared to Rajasthan state average of 888. Literacy rate of Rishabhdeo city is 85.60%, higher than the state average of 66.11%. In Rishabhdeo, male literacy is around 92.29% while female literacy rate is 78.44%.

Rishabhdeo Census Town has total administration over 1,921 houses to which it supplies basic amenities like water and sewerage. It is also authorize to build roads within Census Town limits and impose taxes on properties coming under its jurisdiction.

According to the figures of Census 2011 on the basis of religion, Hindus are 75.39%, Jains 23.91% and others 0.7%.

About three-fourths of the residents of the town are Hindu, belonging to Brahmin, Suthar, Lohar, Tailor, Mochi, Kumhar, Somupura, Valmiki and other casts and another one-fourth 95% belonging to the Digambara Jain are here from many years ago. Shwetambar Jains are also residing here. Many Bhil and Meena villages are surrounding Rishabhdeo, and they have come every day to Rishbhdeo for prayer, in sects belonging to Bispanthi Narsingpura and Humad communities.

Rishabhdeo is also famous for green marble. It has more than 300 marble mines in massaor ki obri and odavas kagder. About 90% percent of the green marble around the world is produced by Rishabhdeo. Nearly 70% percent of the marble of Rishabhdeo is exported to the US, UAE, Canada and many other countries.

== Gaj Mandir ==
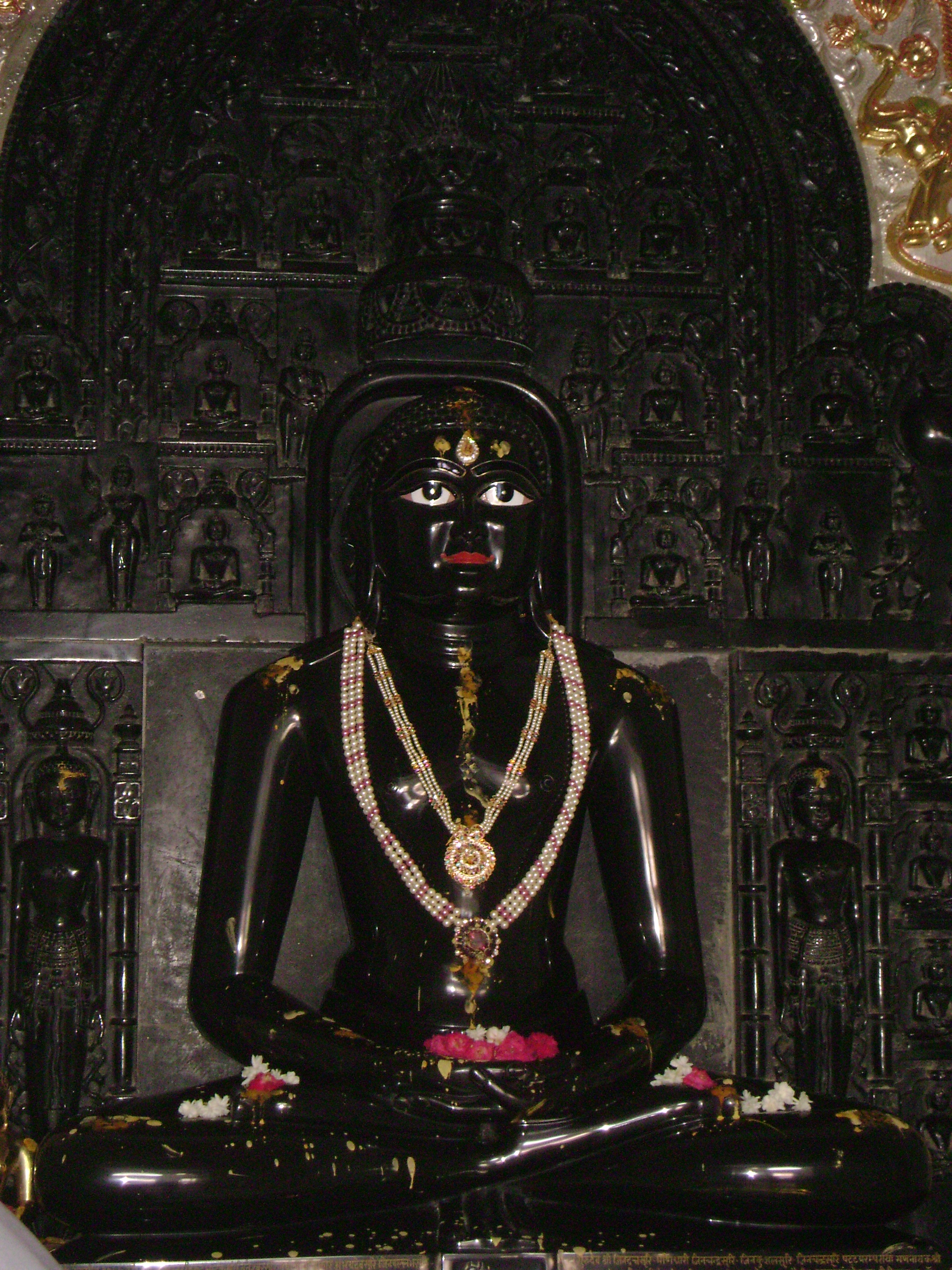
Main Idol inside Gaj Mandir

Gaj Mandir is a Jain Shwetambar Temple built in 2011 in Rishabhdeo. The place is well known for the Kika Bhai Dharmshala. The management of Kika bhai dharmshala is under Kikabhai Premchand Trust and purely owned by Jain Shwetambar community. This temple has a very good architecture made with pure white marble. The name "gaj Mandir" represents the statue of elephants at the entrance of temple. The main idol of the temple is "lord rishbhdev" statue made with black granite.

== Other local attractions ==
Nearby places worth visiting include: Gurukul Jain temple, Kanch ka mandir, Paglyaji, mahaveer jinalaya, Rishabh Garden, Patshala Jain temple, Ram Mandir, Emliyachod Hanuman ji, Chandragiri, Bhim Pagalya, Bhattarak Kirti Bhavan, Vishwakarmaji mandir, Satyanarayan mandir, Suraj kund Ganesh temple, Rayana Hanuman ji, Dadabadi, and vaghuvan.

== See also ==
- Narsingpura
- Nagarparkar Jain Temples
