= Raidhu =

Indian author

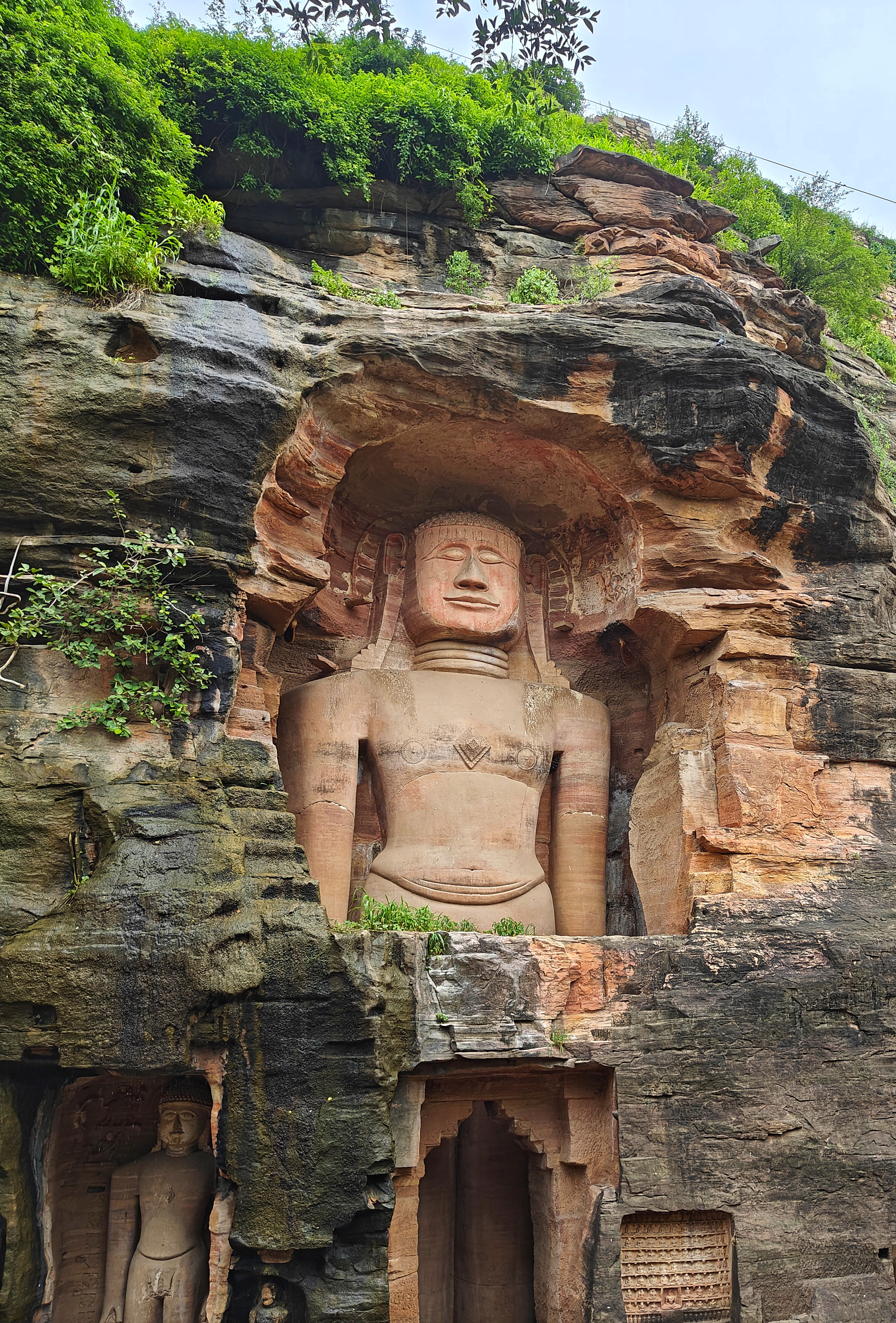
The Adinatha statue at the Gwalior fort was consecrated by Raidhu

Raidhu (IAST: Raidhū; 1393–1489) was an Apabhramsha poet from Gwalior, and an important figure in the Digambara Jain community. He supervised the pratishtha consecration ceremony of many—perhaps most—of the Jain idols carved on the hill side in the Gwalior Fort during the rule of Tomara rulers Dungarasimha and Kirtisimha.

== Biography ==
Raidhu was born in the Padmavati Purval Jain community, as he himself acknowledged. His birthplace is uncertain, but he appears to have spent most of his life in or around Gwalior. He was a lay disciple of the Jain leader Bramha Shripal, who was a disciple of Bhattaraka Yashahkiriti of Kashtha Sangha.

Raidhu was an important figure in the Gwalior court, where he stayed at the invitation of the Tomara king Dungarasimha. He was also a close associate of the Digambara ascetics (Bhattarakas) who were influential in the Tomara court. Besides, Raidhu was patronized by several wealthy Jain merchants. Raidhu played a central role in connecting these different groups together: he authored religious books for the wealthy merchants, and encouraged them to donate money towards religious causes.

Raidhu's powerful and wealthy sponsors helped disseminate his literary works, some of which are lavishly illustrated (e.g. Jasodharacariu). These patrons included Kamalasimha, Yashahkirti, Khelha Brahmachari, Sanghadhipati Nemadasa and Asapati. Kamalasimha started the development of Gwalior as a Jain holy place, with support from the Tomara rulers Dungarasimha and Kirtisimha. The Digambara monk Yashahkirti and Khelha Brahmachari encouraged Raidhu to write Sammaijiṇacariu, a biography of Mahavira. Khelha also commissioned the colossal image of Chandraprabha. Sanghadhipati Nemadasa was a patron of Raidhu's poem Puṇṇāsavakahākosa, and also built a Jain shrine on his recommendation. Asapati was a minister of the Tomara king Dungarasimha.

== Jain images ==
Raidhu was also responsible for consecrating many of the Jain rock carvings inside the fort, as attested by multiple inscriptions. These include the two colossal images of Adinatha (57 feet) and Chandraprabha. Medieval Jain texts state that certain sacred mountains covered with images of Jinas would survive the destruction of the world. Raidhu's poems often mention the end times, and several near-contemporary poets also allude to the end times amid the Muslim conquests. Therefore, it appears that the colossal Jain images were intended to ensure the survival of Gopalagiri (the Gwalior fort hill) in the end times.

== Literary works ==
सं १५१० वर्षे माघ सुदी ८ सोमे गोपाचल दुर्गे तोमर वंशान्वये राजा श्री डूंगरेन्द्र देव राज्य पवित्रमाने श्री काष्ठासंघ माथुरान्वये भट्टारक श्री गुणकीर्ति देवास्तत्पट्टे श्री मलयकीर्ति देवास्ततो भट्टारक गुणभद्रदेव पंडितवर्य रइघू तदाम्नाये अग्रोतवंशे वासिलगोत्रे सकेलहा भार्या निवारी तयोः पुत्र विजयष्ट शाह ... साधु श्री माल्हा पुत्र संघातिपति देउताय पुत्र संघातिपति करमसीह श्री चन्द्रप्रभु जिनबिंब महाकाय प्रतिष्ठापित प्रणमति ..शुभम् भवतु ..

— A Gwalior Fort Inscription 1453 CE

Raidhu composed several poems in Apabhramsha, many of which have survived. He composed many of these poems while living in the Jain temples of Gopalagiri. Rajaram Jain translated Raidhu's poems into Hindi language.

Raidhu's known works include:

- Anathmi Kaha
- Appa Samboha Kavva ("Addressing myself")
- Balahadda Chariu, written at the request of Agrawal Sahu Harsi.
- Bhadrabāhucariu
  - An account of Bhadrabahu
- Dashalakshana Jayamala
- Dhanakumar Chariu
- Jasodhara-Chariu
- Jivandhar Chariu
- Mesehar Chariu
- Puṇṇāsavakahākosa (Punnasava-kahakosa)
  - Composed at the request of Sanghadhipati Nemadasa
- Ritthanemi Chariu
- Sammaijiṇacariu or Sammai Jinachariu
  - A biography of Mahavira, written on the request of Khelha Brahmachari, the son of Agrawal Sahu Tosau of Hisar. The book also gives a history of the family of Sahu Tosau since the time of Feroze Shah.
- Sammat Gunanihana
  - written on the request of Goel Agrawal Kamal Singh in sam 1492.
- Savaya Chariu
  - Written at the request of Golalare Sandhadhip Kusharaj
- Shodhashakarana Jayamala
- Siddhantartha Sar
- Siripal Chariu
- Sukaushal Chariu
- Vrattasar

Some of his texts are still being discovered in Jain libraries. A Raidhu Award, named after him, of Rs. 21,000 is given every year by the Shyamlal Shastri Trust in Firozabad, Uttar Pradesh.

== See also ==
- Jain literature
- History of the Hindi language
