= Kashmiri Hindus =

Ethnic Kashmiris who adhere to Hinduism and are native to the Kashmir Valley

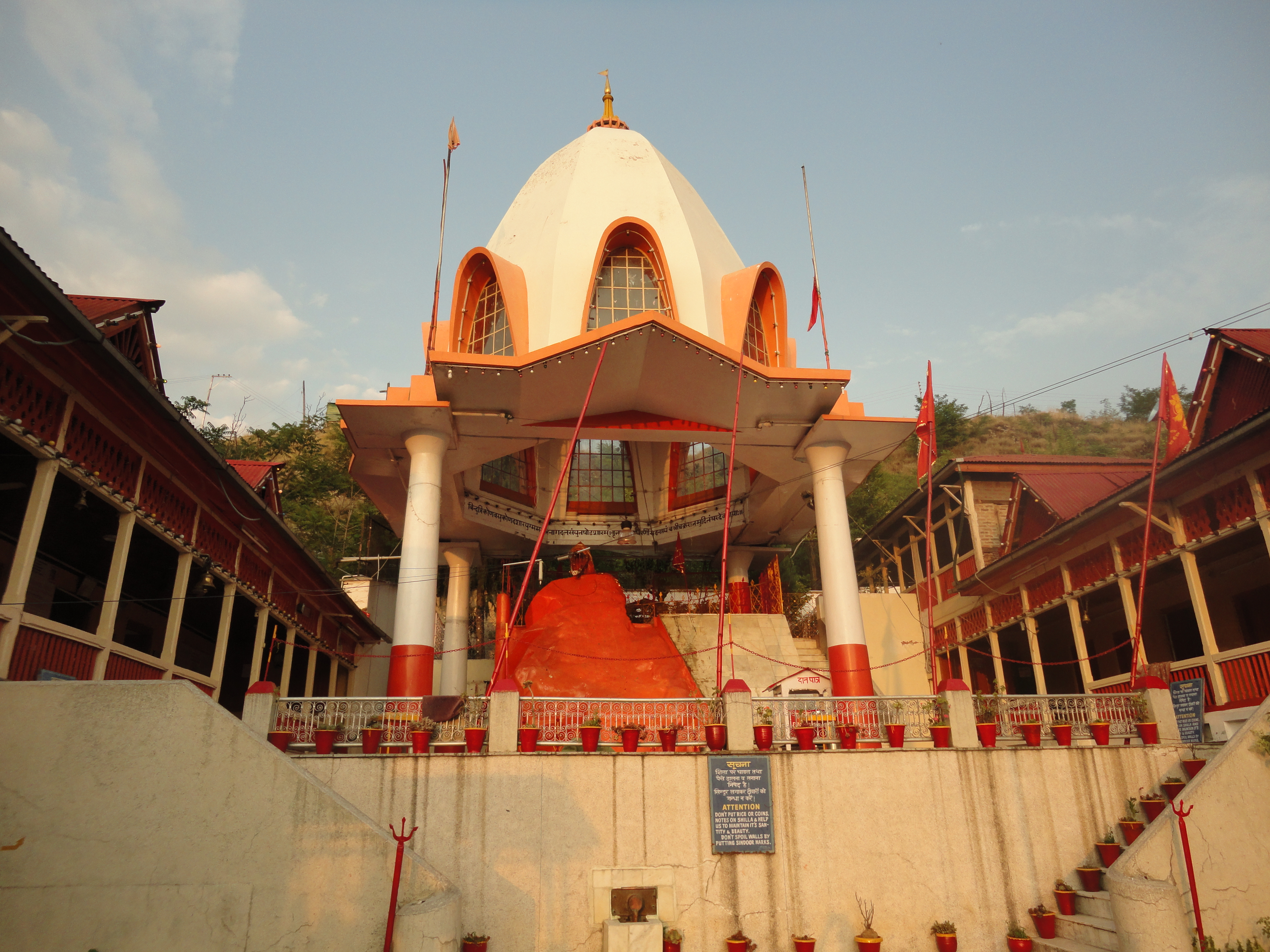
- Hari Parbat Temple in Jammu and Kashmir.

Religions
- Majority; Kashmir Shaivism; Minority; Shaivism, Vaishnavism and Shaktism

Languages
- Sacred language Sanskrit Ethnic language Kashmiri Other languages Hindi, Urdu, English

Kashmiri Hindus are ethnic Kashmiris who practice Hinduism and are native to the Kashmir Valley of Jammu and Kashmir, India. The only group of Kashmir Hindus that exist today are the Kashmiri Pandits. They have made significant contributions to Indian philosophy, especially to the tradition of Kashmiri Shaivism. Following their exodus from the Kashmir Valley in the wake of the Islamist insurgency in the 1990s, most Kashmiri Hindus are now settled in the Jammu division of Jammu and Kashmir, and in other parts of the country.

== History ==
=== Ancient ===
During the reign of Ashoka (304–232 BCE), Kashmir became part of the Maurya Empire, and Buddhism was introduced in the region. During this period, many stupas, several shrines dedicated to Shiva, and the city of Srinagari (Srinagar) were built. Kanishka (127–151 CE), an emperor of the Kushan Empire, conquered Kashmir and established the new city of Kanishkapur.

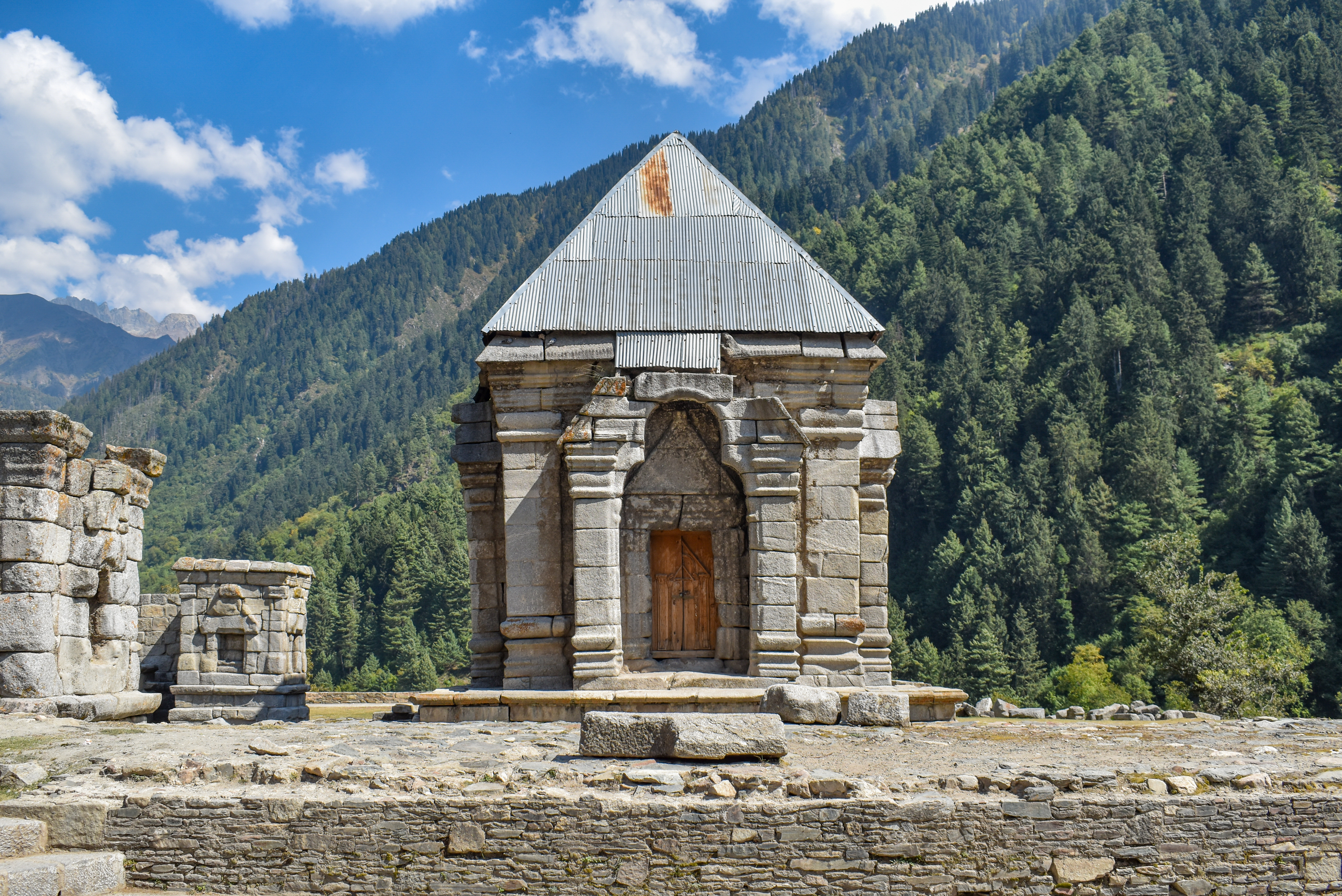
A c. 8th century CE Shaiva Hindu temple complex in the Himalayas of Kashmir

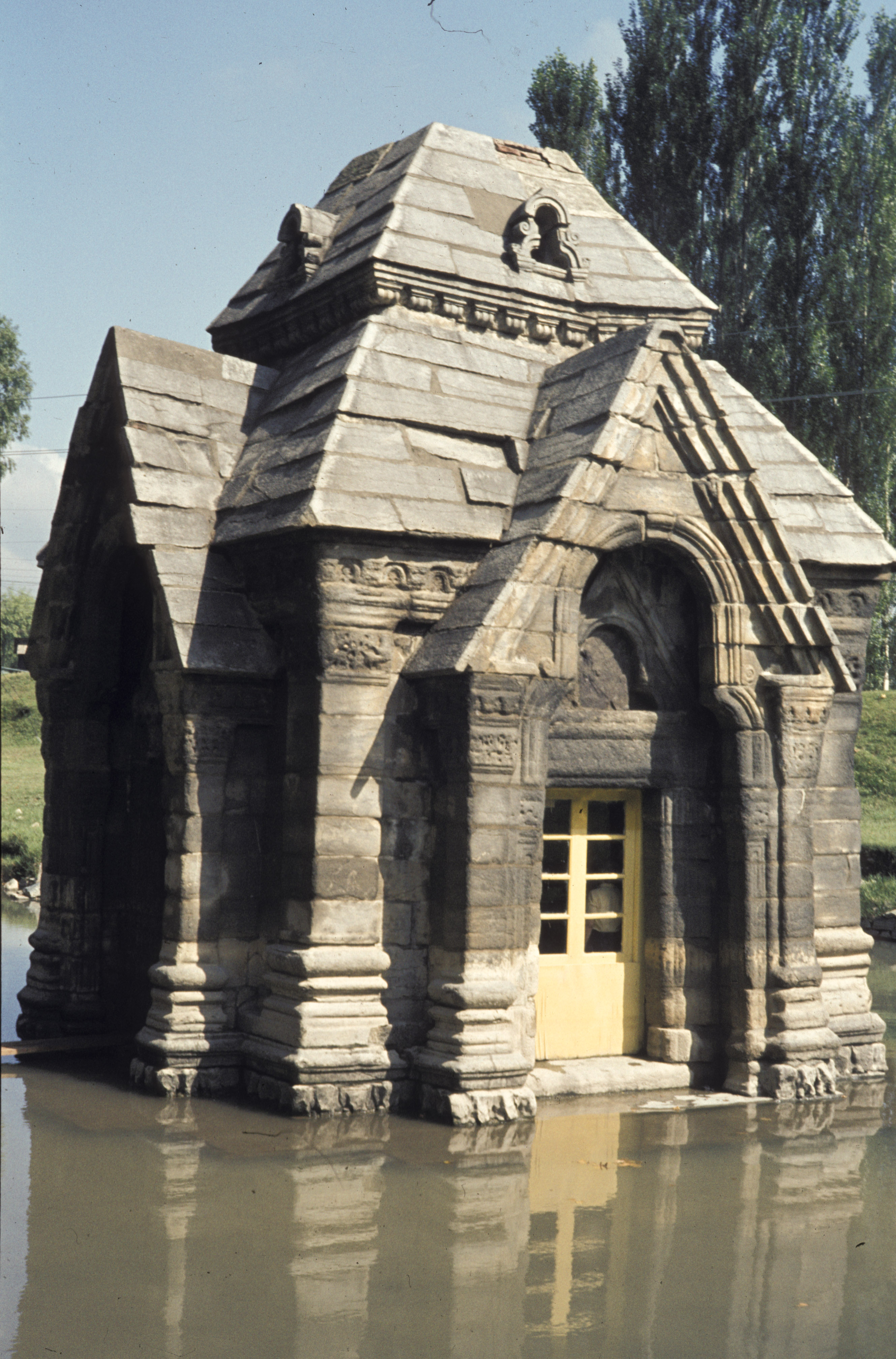
Shiva Temple at Pandrethan, Kashmir, built c. 8th–9th century CE

=== Medieval ===
The Karkota dynasty (625–855 CE) ruled over the Kashmir and parts of northern Indian subcontinent and their rule saw political expansion, economic prosperity and emergence of Kashmir as a centre of culture and scholarship. Lalitaditya Muktapida (724–760 CE) was a powerful ruler of the Karkota dynasty of Kashmir region in the Indian subcontinent. After the seventh century, significant developments took place in Kashmiri Hinduism. In the centuries that followed, Kashmir produced many poets, philosophers, and artists who contributed to Sanskrit literature and Hindu religion. Among notable scholars of this period was Vasugupta (c. 875–925 CE) who wrote the Shiva Sutras which laid the foundation for a monistic Shaiva system called Kashmir Shaivism.

After the dawn of the Lohara dynasty, Islam had spread into regions surrounding Kashmir. In the absence of support from the Hindu majority, Rinchana sought the support of the Kashmiri Muslims. Shah Mir's coup on Rinchana's successor secured Muslim rule and the rule of his dynasty in Kashmir.

== Demography ==
The largest community among Kashmiri Hindus are the Kashmiri Pandits (Kashmiri Brahmins), who are divided into several gotras, such as the priests (gor or bhasha Bhatta), astrologers (Zutshi), and workers (Karkun).

The Wani are historically Banias, with subcastes, such as the Kesarwani. During the Mughal era, many Kesarwanis migrated to other parts of India, including Madhya Pradesh, Bihar and Uttar Pradesh.

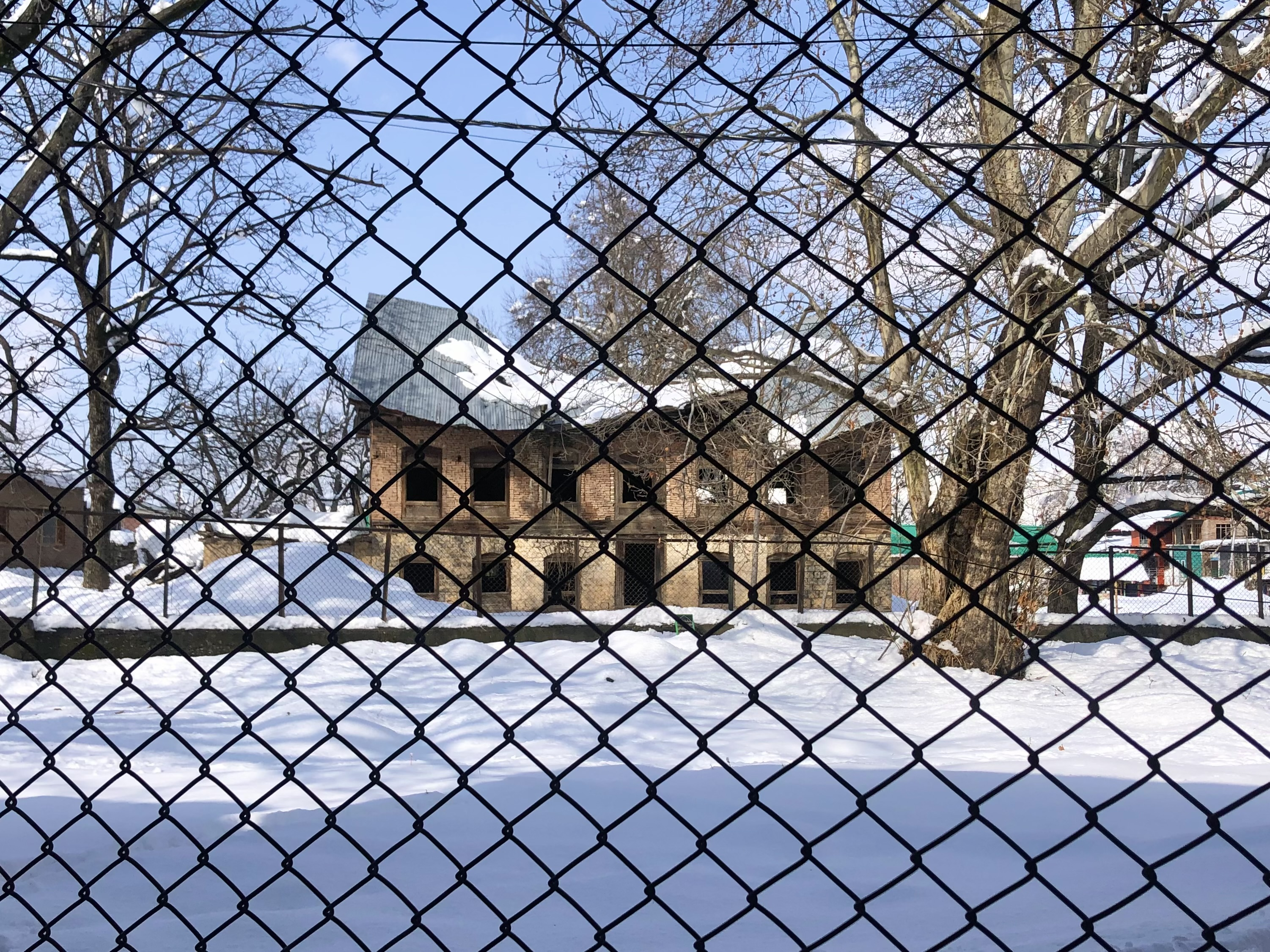
Ruins of a house abandoned by Kashmiri Hindus during their exodus from Kashmir Valley due to targeted violence in an insurgency in the region

According to officials, 98,600 Kashmiri Hindus had been issued domicile certificates of Jammu and Kashmir by the end of June 2021. They further stated, "90,430 domicile certificates were issued to displaced Kashmiri Pandits, while 2,340 families of displaced Kashmiri Pandits were registered as fresh migrants. Of these, 8,170 individuals received the domicile certificate."

On 16 May 2020, Order 52 was issued by the Jammu and Kashmir Department of Disaster Management, Relief, Rehabilitation and Reconstruction (JK DMRRR) which states that: "Bonafide migrants and bonafide displaced persons who are not yet registered with the relief and rehabilitation commissioner (migrant), Jammu and Kashmir, can apply before the competent authority for registration for purpose of issuance of a domicile certificate only." This is as long as one of the necessary documents is provided. The timeframe for registration (and claiming domicile) of Kashmiri migrants and displaced persons was later extended for the final time up to 15 May 2022.

== Persecution ==
Under the rule of Sultan Sikander Butshikan in the 14th century CE, many Kashmiri Hindus were forcibly converted to Islam. They began to leave the valley in much greater numbers in the 1990s during the eruption of militancy following large scale militarization of Valley.

== Notable people ==
This is a list of notable Kashmiri Hindus.

- Piyare Lal Handoo, 6th Lok Sabha Member, Anantnag
- S. L. Shakdher, 6th Chief Election Commissioner of India and former Secretary-General of 3rd Lok Sabha, 4th Lok Sabha and 5th Lok Sabha.
- Anupam Kher, Indian actor
- Bhai Almast, Udasi saint
- Bhai Balu Hasna, Udasi saint
- Kunal Khemu, Indian actor
- R N Kao, one of the founders and First Secretary of R&AW
- KR$NA, Indian rapper
- Jawaharlal Nehru, first Prime Minister of India
- Mohit Raina, Indian actor
- Samay Raina, standup comedian and chess enthusiast
- Virendra Mohan Dar, King and founder of House of Dar
- Bhasha Sumbli, Indian actress
- Tika Lal Taploo, lawyer
- Motilal Nehru, lawyer and leader of Indian National Congress
- Indira Gandhi, former Prime Minister of India
- P. N. Haksar, bureaucrat and diplomat
- Tej Bahadur Sapru, freedom fighter, lawyer, and politician
- Tapishwar Narain Raina, ninth Chief of the Army Staff of Indian Army
- Sanjiv Bhatt, Indian Police Service officer of the Gujarat-cadre
- Ram Chandra Kak, Prime Minister of Jammu and Kashmir (1945-1947)
- Mohan Lal Zutshi, traveler, diplomat, and author, and an important player in the Great Game.
- Vijaya Lakshmi Pandit, Indian freedom fighter, diplomat and politician. She served as the 8th President of the United Nations General Assembly from 1953 to 1954, the first woman appointed to either post. She was also the 3rd Governor of Maharashtra from 1962 to 1964
- Vikram Misri, the 35th Foreign Secretary of India
- Rajiv Shakdher, He served as Chief Justice of the Himachal Pradesh High Court. He is a former Judge of Delhi High Court and Madras High Court
- Aditya Dhar, Indian film director

== See also ==
- Dogra Rajput
- Kashmiri diaspora

== Bibliography ==
- The Hindu History of Kashmir by Horace Hayman Wilson ISBN 9788186714300, 8186714308
- Kashmir Hindu Religious Culture By Chaman Lal Gadoo ISBN 9788191005714, 8191005719
- Hindus of Kashmir - A Genocide Forgotten by Bansi Pandit ISBN 9798586697035
- The Hindu-Buddhist Sculpture of Ancient Kashmir and Its Influences By John Siudmak ISBN 9789004248328, 9004248323
- Kashmir: Its Aborigines and Their Exodusby Colonel Tej K Tikoo ISBN 9781935501589, 1935501585 ISBN 9781942426417, 1942426410
- Kasheer - A Diabolical Betrayal of Kashmiri Hindus By Sahana Vijayakumar ISBN 9781942426417
- Genocide of Hindus in Kashmir by Suruchi Prakashan
- The Infidel Next Door By Rajat Kanti Mitra ISBN 9781088402733, 1088402739
- The Odyssey Of Kashmiri Pandits Destination-Homeland-Panun Kashmir by Dr M. L. Bhat ISBN 9781947586253, 1947586254
