= Kashtha Sangha =

Digambar Jain monastic order

Kashtha Sangha (काष्ठा संघ) was a Digambar Jain monastic order once dominant in several regions of North and Western India. It is considered to be a branch of Mula Sangh itself. It is said to have originated from a town named Kashtha.

सं १५१० वर्षे माघ सुदी ८ सोमे गोपाचल दुर्गे तोमर वंशान्वये राजा श्री डूंगरेन्द्र देव राज्य पवित्रमाने श्री काष्ठासंघ माथुरान्वये भट्टारक श्री गुणकीर्ति देवास्तत्पट्टे श्री मलयकीर्ति देवास्ततो भट्टारक गुणभद्रदेव पंडितवर्य रइघू तदाम्नाये अग्रोतवंशे वासिलगोत्रे सकेलहा भार्या निवारी तयोः पुत्र विजयष्ट शाह ... साधु श्री माल्हा पुत्र संघातिपति देउताय पुत्र संघातिपति करमसीह श्री चन्द्रप्रभु जिनबिंब महाकाय प्रतिष्ठापित प्रणमति ..शुभम् भवतु ..

— A Gwalior Fort Inscription 1453 CE

== Origin ==
The origin of Kashtha Sangha is often attributed to Lohacharya in several texts and inscriptions from Delhi region. The Kashtasangh Gurvavali identifies Lohacharya as the last person who knew Acharanga in the Digambara tradition, who lived until the 683rd year of the nirvana of Lord Mahavira. the Darshanasara of Devasena (VS 990) attributes the origin to Kumarasena in Vikram Samvat 753.

Acharya Chandrasena initiated Aryanandi. Aryanandi initiated Virasena and Jayasena. Virasena initiated six disciples who were Dasharayguru, Jinasena, Vinayasena, Shripal, Padmasena and Devasena. Dasharayguru and Jinasena initiated Gunabhadra who later initiated Lokasena. Vinayasena initiated Kumarasena who started the Kashtha Sangha.

== Communities ==
Several of the Jain communities were affiliated with the Kashtha Sangha. The Agrawal Jains were the major supporters of Kashtha Sangha. They are said to have been initiated by Lohacharya in antiquity. Muni Sabha Singh writes in his Padma Purana (VS 1711)

काष्ठा संघी माथुर गच्छ, पहुकर गण में निरमल पछ||
महा निर्ग्रन्थ आचारज लोह, छांड्या सकल जाति का मोह||
अग्रोहे निकट प्रभु ठाढे जोग, करैं वन्दना सब ही लोग||
अग्रवाल श्रावक प्रतिबोध, त्रेपन क्रिया बताई सोध||

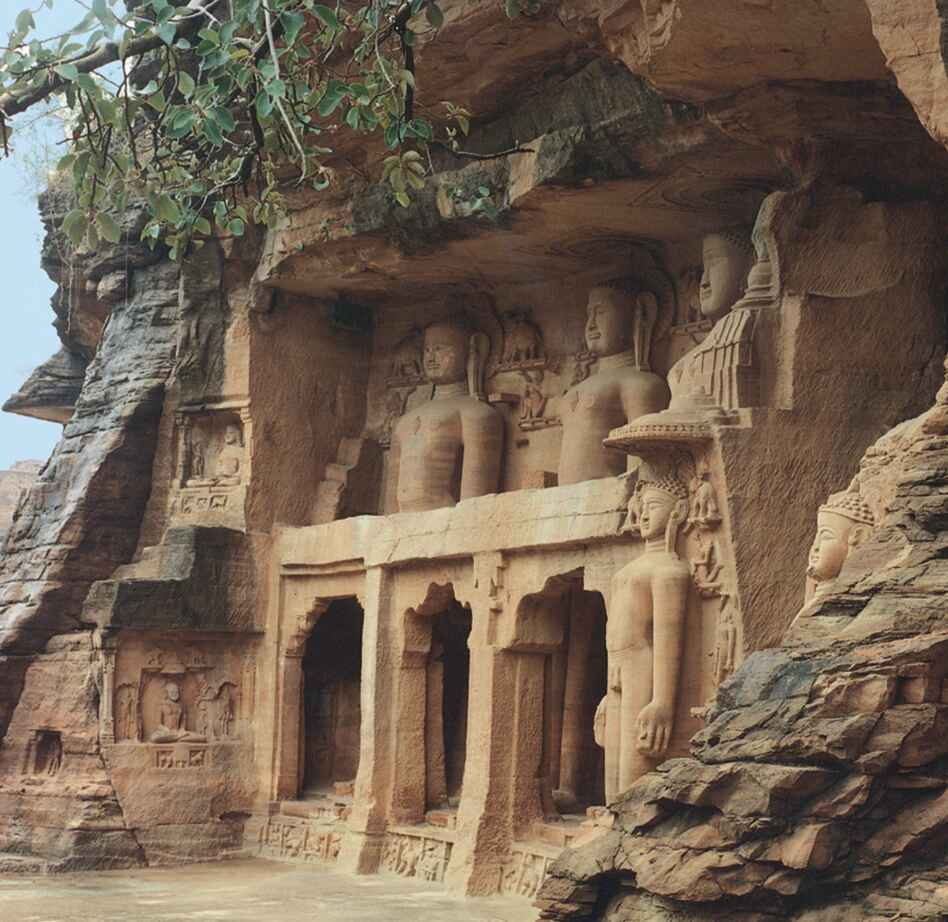
Rock-carved colossal Jain images in Gwalior consecrated by Bhattarakas of Kashtha Sangh

Kashta Sangha included several orders:

- Nanditat gachchha: associated with Nanded. It is also called Ramasenanvaya, after Acharya Ramasena, the founder of the Narsingpura community.
- Mathura Sangha: The Agrawals were associated with this order. It was founded by Ramasena according to Darshanasar. The oldest known inscription is of 1170 AD.
- Bagada gachha: associated with Vagad region of Rajasthan
- Lata-bagada gachha: associated with Vagad and Lata region of Gujarat. The 1145 AD inscription of Dubkunda mentions this order. The acharyas of this order formerly used to reside in the Punnata region of Karnataka. Jinasena, the author Harivansh Purana in shaka 705 belonged to this order.

Kashta Sangha eventually merged into Mula Sangh. The celebrated poet and pratishthacharya Raighu was a disciple of the Kashtha Sangh Bhattarakas of Gwalior.

The rock carved Jain statues in the Gwalior Fort were mostly consecrated by the Kashtha Sangh Bhattarakas, as stated in the inscriptions dated between 1441 and 1474.
