= Kansabanik =

Hindu caste from west Bengal, Odisha and Assam

Kansabanik/Kansari
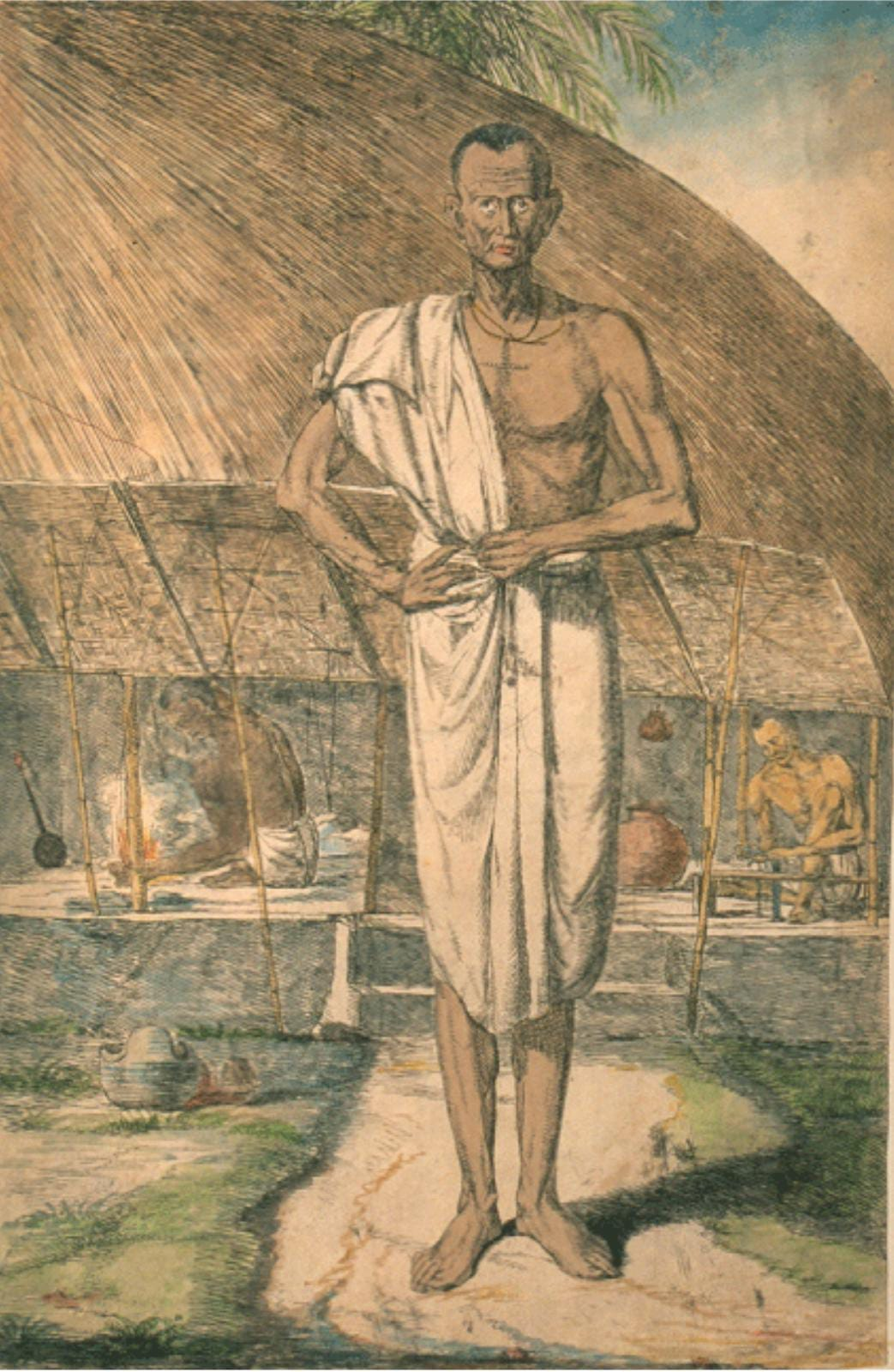
- Kansari coppersmith, from a 1799 collection of etchings
- Kuladevta (male): Vishwakarma
- Kuladevi (female): Lakshmi
- Religions: Hinduism
- Languages: Bengali, Odia
- Populated states: West Bengal, Odisha

Kansabanik or Kansari is a Hindu caste from West Bengal, Odisha and Assam state of India. They are traditionally braziers and coppersmiths by profession. Kansabanik represents one of the fourteen castes belonging to 'Nabasakh' group in Bengal. Kanshabaniks are recognized as Other Backward Class by the Government of West Bengal.

== Varna status ==
Bṛhaddharma Puraṇa placed Kansabanik and other trading castes in middle-ranking Shudra category.

== See also ==
- Dhokra
- Karmakar
