= Kansal =

Indian Surname

Kansal is a surname of Bania caste originating in northern India. It is one of the gotras of the Agarwal Bania community.

== See also ==
- Aggarwal
- Vaishya
