= Hūmaḍa =

Humad (or Humbad) is the name of an ancient Jain Digambara community originally from Gujarat and Rajasthan, India. Their traditional center is in the Rajasthan cities of Pratapgarh, Dungarpur and Sagwara region, often called Vagad (or Raidesh).
