= Agrawal =

Bania community in the Indian subcontinent

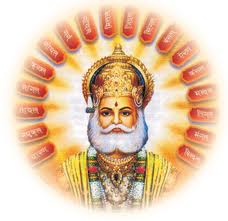
- Maharaja Agrasen, the legendary king who was the forefather of Agrawals
- Varna: Vaishya
- Jāti: Bania
- Classification: General Category
- Gotra: See below
- Kuladevi (female): Mahalakshmi
- Religions: Majority: Hinduism; Jainism; Minority: Sikhism; Islam; Christianity
- Languages: Hindi; Rajasthani languages; Braj Bhasha; Haryanvi; Bundeli; Kannauji; Bagheli; Punjabi
- Country: India; Nepal; Pakistan
- Region: Hindi Belt (Western Uttar Pradesh; Rajasthan; Haryana; Delhi; Madhya Pradesh); Punjab
- Lineage: Agrasen
- Notable members: See list
- Related groups: Agrahari
- Historical grouping: Suryavamsha-Raghuvamsha

Agrawal (Agarwal, Agerwal, Agrawala, Agarwala, Agarwalla, Aggarwal, Agarawal, Agarawala, or Aggrawal) is a Bania Vaishya community. The Banias of northern India are a cluster of several communities.

They are found throughout northern India, mainly in the states of Rajasthan, Uttar Pradesh, Haryana, Delhi, Madhya Pradesh, Punjab, Chandigarh, Jammu and Kashmir, Himachal Pradesh, Uttarakhand, Gujarat, and Maharashtra. They are also found in the Pakistani provinces of Punjab and Sindh, though at the time of the partition of India, most of them migrated across the newly created border to independent India. Most Agrawals follow Vaishnava Hinduism or Jainism, while a minority adhere to Islam or Christianity.

The Agrawal are the descendants of Maharaja Agrasen (b. 4250 or 3082 BCE), a Kshatriya king of the Agroha Kingdom. He is claimed to have been one of the descendants of the Hindu deity Rama. Their primary goddess was Lakshmi, who blessed the king and his descendants to be prosperous always by her and her consort, Vishnu's kindness. Maharaja Agrasen himself adopted the Vaishya tradition of Hinduism.

The Agrawal are Suryavamsha and belong to the Raghuvamsha house.

The Agrawal are also known for their entrepreneurship and business acumen. In modern-day tech and e-commerce companies, they continue to dominate. It was reported in 2013, that for every 100 rupees in funding for e-commerce companies in India, 40 went to firms founded by Agrawals.

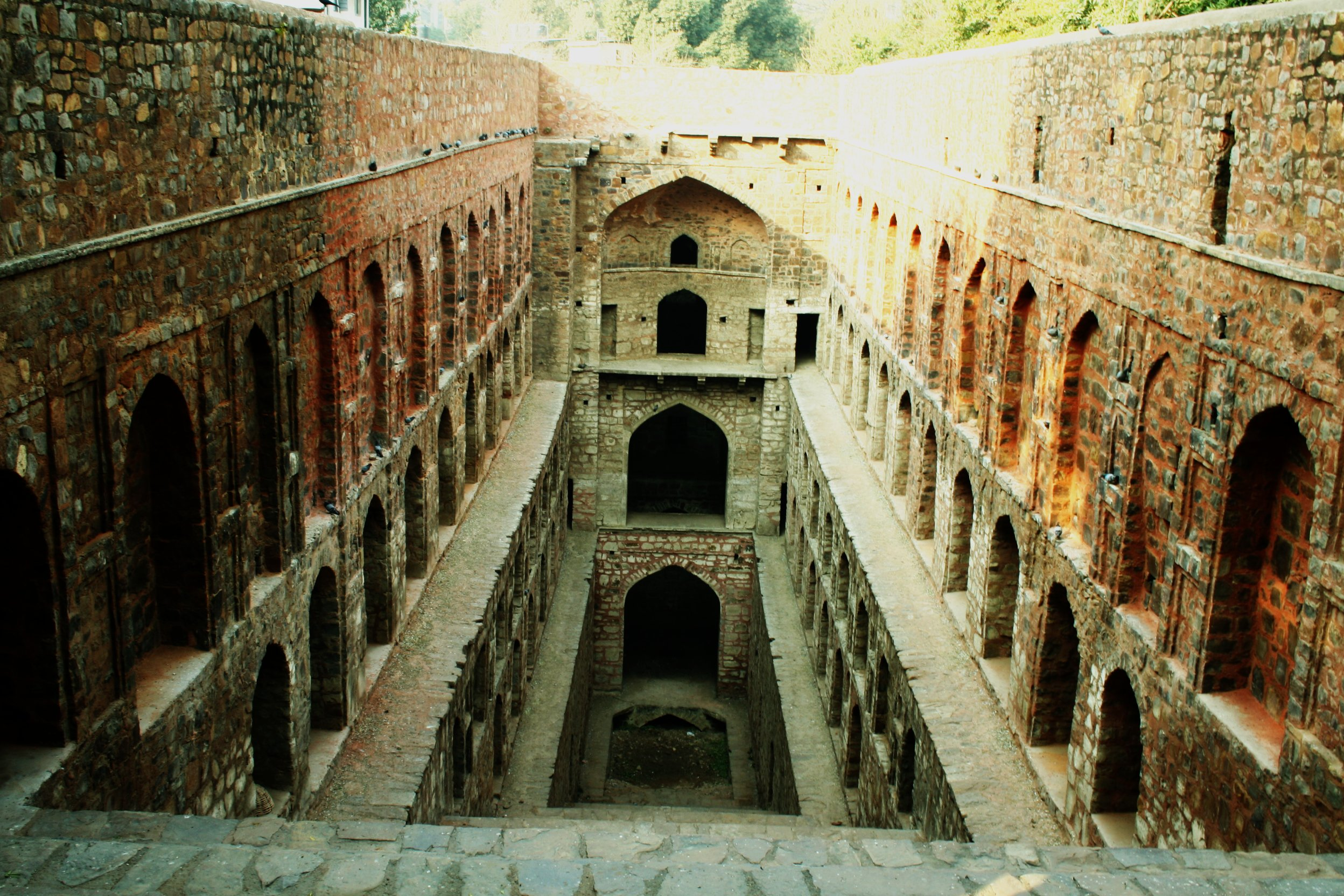
Agrasen Ki Baoli in Delhi, which was built by the Agrawal community during the Tughlaq dynasty in India.

== History ==
Agrawals are one of the Bania (merchant) communities in India, which includes other mercantile communities like Maheshwari, and Oswals.

In inscriptions and texts, the original home of the Agrawal community is stated as Agroha, near Hisar, Haryana.

- In Pradumna Charita of samvat 1411 (1354 AD), the Agrawal poet Sadharu wrote "अग्रवाल की मेरी जात, पुर अग्रोहा महि उतपात" ("My jāti is Agrawal, and I trace my roots to the city of Agroha).
- In his Padma Purana of VS 1711 (AD 1654), Muni Sabhachandra writes "अग्रोहे निकट प्रभु ठाढे जोग, करैं वन्दना सब ही लोग|| अग्रवाल श्रावक प्रतिबोध, त्रेपन क्रिया बताई सोध||", (When Lohacharya was near Agroha, he taught the 53 actions to the Agrawal shravakas).
- In a Sanskrit inscription, the Agrawals are referred to as Agrotaka ("from Agroha"). A 1272 AD inscription states: "सं १३२९ चैत्र वुदी दशम्यां बुधवासरे अद्येह योगिनिपुरे समस्त राजावलि-समलन्कृत ग्यासदीन राज्ये अत्रस्थित अग्रोतक परम श्रावक जिनचरणकमल".

Some of the Agrawals adapted Jainism under the influence of Lohacharya.

=== Migration to Delhi ===
The Agrawal merchant Nattal Sahu and the Agrawal poet Vibudh Shridhar lived during the reign of Tomara King Anangapal of Yoginipur (now Mehrauli, near Delhi). Vibudh Shridhar wrote Pasanahacariu in 1132 AD, which includes a historical account of Yoginipur then.

In 1354, Firuz Shah Tughluq had started the construction of a new city near Agroha, called Hisar-e-Feroza ("the fort of Firuz"). Most of the raw material for building the town was brought from Agroha. The town later came to be called Hisar. Hisar became a major center of the Agrawal community. Some Agrawals are also said to have moved to the Kotla Firoz Shah fort in Delhi, built by Firuz Shah Tughlaq.

=== Migration to Rajput kingdoms ===
During the era of Islamic administrative rule in India, some Agrawal, as with the Saraogi, migrated to the Bikaner State. The Malkana include Muslim Agrawals, who converted from Hinduism to Islam during this time and were given land tracts along the Yamuna by Afghan rulers.

In the early 15th century, Agrawals flourished under the Tomaras of Gwalior. According to several Sanskrit inscriptions at the Gwalior Fort in Gwalior District, several traders (Sanghavi Kamala Simha, Khela Brahmachari, Sandhadhip Namadas etc.) belonging to Agrotavansha (Agrawal clan) supported the sculptures and carving of idols at the place. Historian K. C. Jain comments:

Golden Age of the Jain Digambar Temple in Gwalior under the Tomara rulers inspired by the Kashtha Bhattarakas and their Jaina Agrawal disciples who dominated the Court of father and son viz. Dungar Singh (1425-59)and Kirti Singh (1459–80) with the Poet-Laureate Raighu as their mouthpiece and spokesman, a centenarian author of as many as thirty books, big and small of which two dozen are reported to be extant today. Verify the advent of the Hisar-Firuza-based Jain Agrawals who functioned as the ministers and treasurers of the ruling family had turned the Rajput State of Gwalior into a Digambara Jain Centre par excellence representing the culture of the Agrawal multi-millionner shravakas as sponsored by them.

=== Migration to Eastern India ===
Later, during the Mughal rule, and during the British East India Company administration, some Agrawals migrated to Nepal, Bihar, and Calcutta, who became the major component of the Marwaris.

== Gotras ==
Agrawals belong to various gotras, traditionally said to be seventeen and a half in number. According to Bharatendu Harishchandra's Agrawalon ki Utpatti (1871), Agrasen - the legendary progenitor of the community - performed 17 sacrifices and left the eighteenth incomplete, resulting in this number. Bharatendu also mentions that Agrasen had 17 queens and a junior queen, but does not mention any connection between the number of gotras and the number of queens, or describe how the sacrifices led to the formation of the gotras. Another popular legend claims that a boy and girl from the Goyan gotra married each other by mistake, which led to the formation of a new "half" gotra. Another popular belief that since Maharaj Agrasen had 17 sons and one daughter, so when his daughter was married the gotra of daughter-in-laws were adopted as half gotra in Agrawals, thus 17.5 gotra.

Historically, there has been no unanimity regarding number and names of these seventeen and a half gotras, and there are regional differences between the list of gotras. The Akhil Bhartiya Agrawal Sammelan, a major organization of Agrawals, has created a standardized list of gotras, which was adopted as an official list by a vote at the organization's 1983 convention. Because the classification of any particular gotra as "half" is considered insulting, the Sammelan provides a list of following 18 gotras:

1. Bansal
2. Goyal
3. Kuchhal
4. Kansal
5. Bindal
6. Jindal
7. Mittal
8. Tingal
9. Tayal
10. Garg
11. Nangal
12. Mangal
13. Airan
14. Madhukul
15. Goyan/Gangal
16. Singhal/Singhala/Singla

The existence of all the gotras mentioned in the list is controversial, and the list does not include several existing clans such as Kotrivala, Pasari, Mudgal, Tibreval, and Singhal.

== See also ==
- Agrawal Jain
