= Bhattaraka =

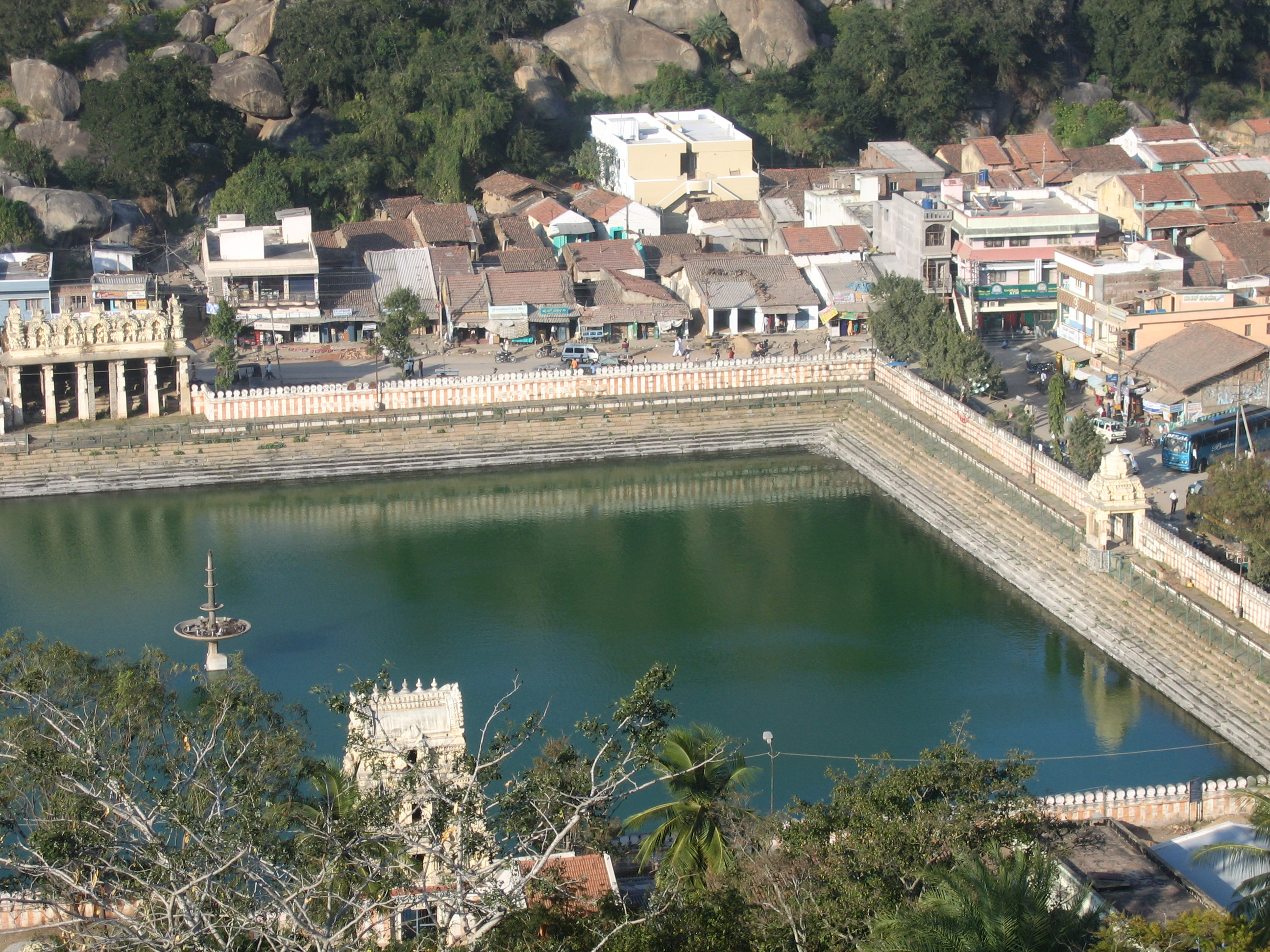
Shravanabelagola is the seat of the bhaṭṭārakas of the Deshiya Gana of the Mula Sangh

A Bhaṭṭāraka (Jain Prakrit: भट्टारक; lit. 'holy one') heads traditional Digambara Jain institutions. He is responsible for training scholars, maintenance of libraries, managing endowments, presiding over installation ceremonies and running Jain institutions.

Epigraphist "K. V. Ramesh" notes that the title Bhaṭṭāraka (male) or Bhaṭṭārikā (female) is the highest monastic administrative rank among Digambara Jainism and denotes senior religious authority, not a designation for ordinary śrāvakas or laypersons. In the Digambara tradition, ordinary śrāvakas and prathimādhāris (those who maintain an image or follow daily devotion) practice the core religious duties, but only those who have taken advanced monastic or administrative responsibilities and strictly follow the dharma in its deepest sense are elevated to the rank of "Bhaṭṭāraka" or "Bhaṭṭārikā". and Bhaṭṭāraka title is exclusive to Jainism and not associated with any other religious tradition.

== Overview ==
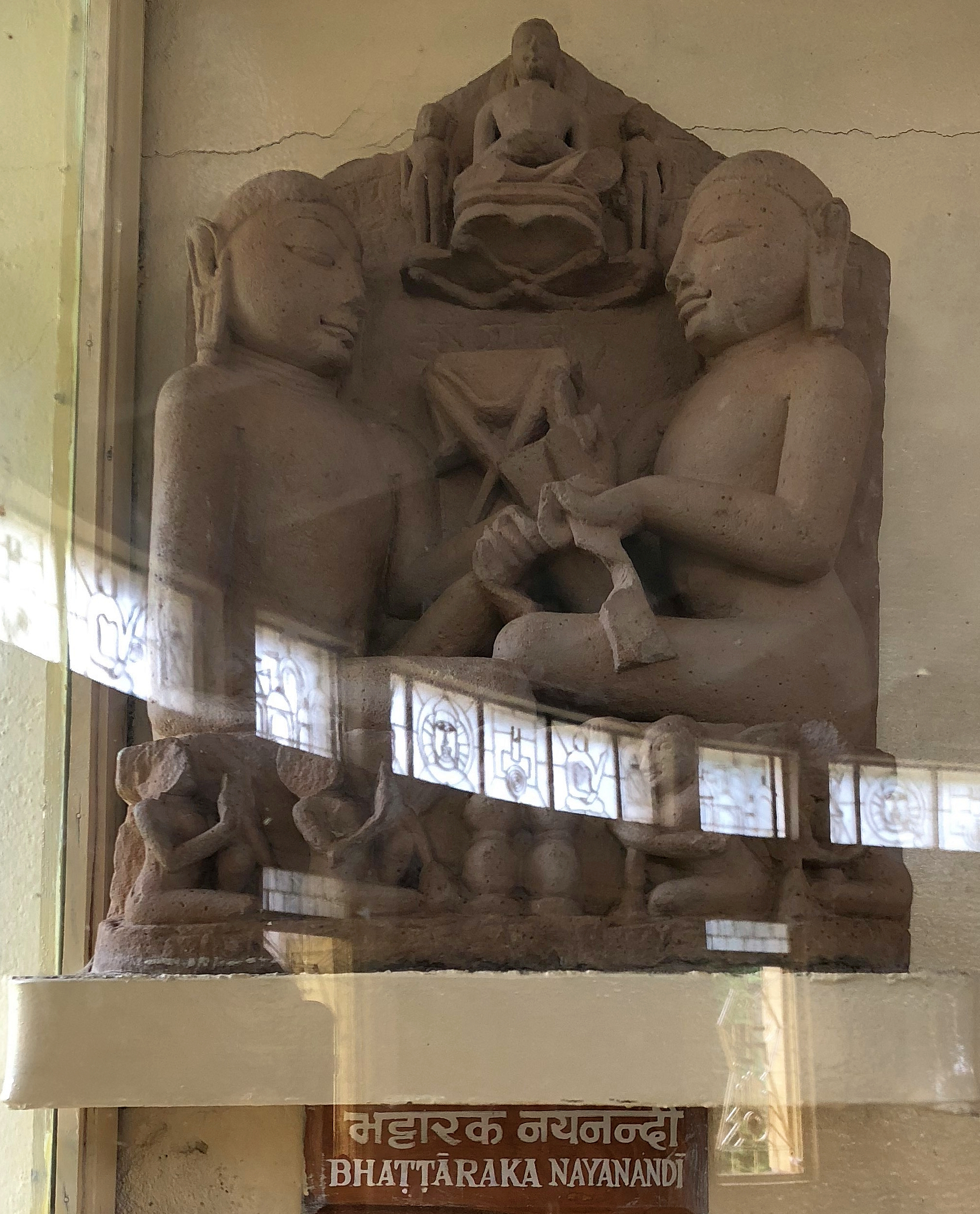
Bhattaraka Nayanadi, Khajuraho sculpture, 11th ent., Jain Museum

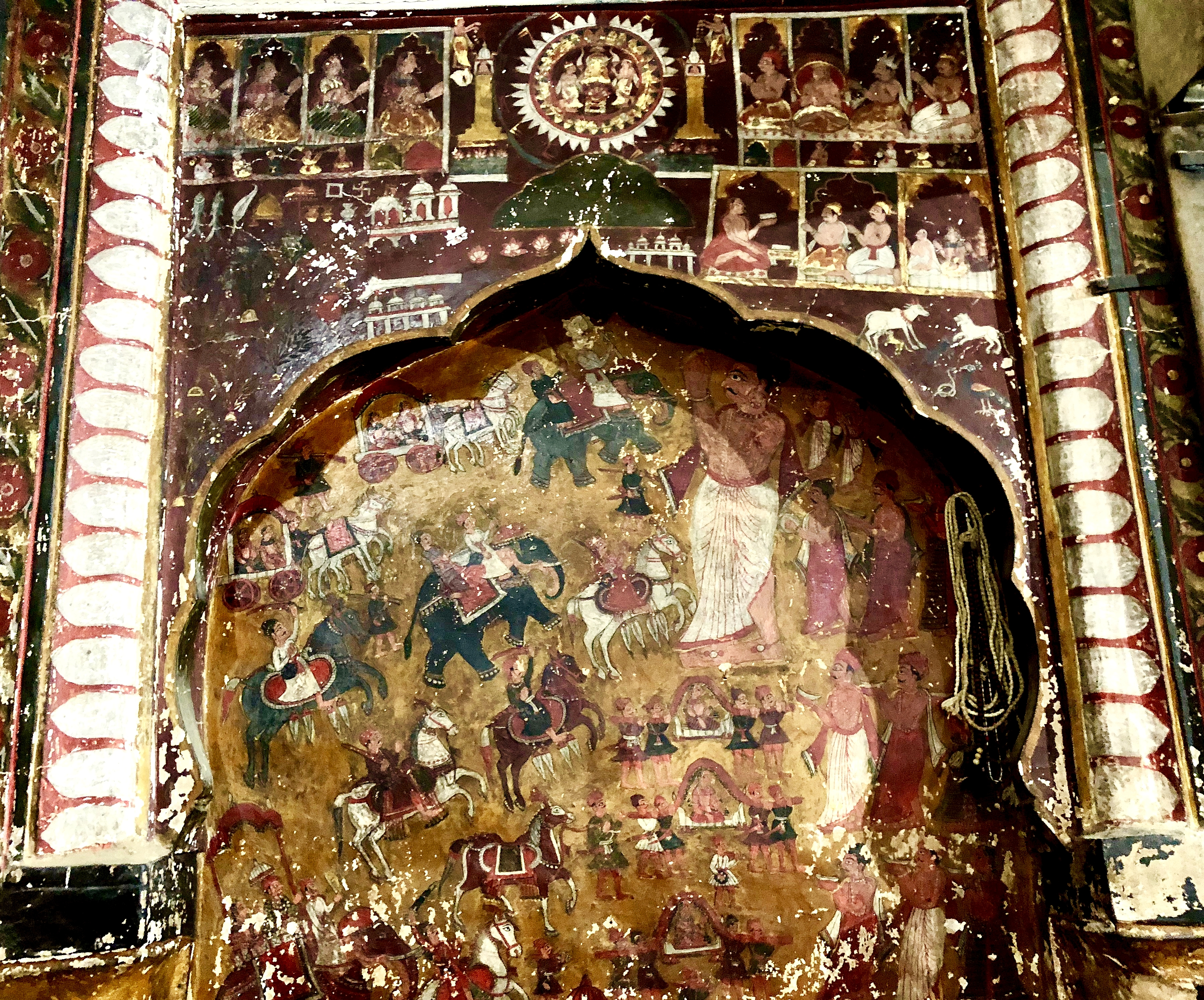
Bhattarak Mahendrakirti of Rehli giving pravachan (upper right), mural Patnaganj-Rehli, 18th century

The term bhaṭṭāraka was used for Virasena, Bhadrabahu and other notables. It has also been used for the Tirthankaras. it is applied to heads of Digambara Jain institutions. Unlike a Digambara monk, a bhaṭṭāraka wears an orange robe, stays in a single place and is involved in management of assets of the institution.

Several of the Bhattarak seats were termed "Vidyasthana" i.e. centers of learning. These include Jaipur, Delhi, Gwalior, Ajmer, Nagaur, Rampur-Bhanpura, Karanaja, Surat, Kolhapur, Jinakanchi, Penukonda, Malkhed, Vijayanagara, Varanga and Hummacha.

The role of a bhaṭṭāraka is described by Brahm Gyansagar, a disciple of Bhaṭṭāraka Shribhushana of Kashtha Sangh Nanditat Gaccha in seventeenth century of the Vikram era, while describing the six components of the Jain Sangha:

Hindi:

भट्टारक सोहि जाण भ्रष्टाचर निवारे, धर्म प्रकाशे दोइ भविक जीव बहु तारे

सकल शस्त्र संपूर्ण सूरिमंत्र आराधे, करे गच्छ उद्धार स्वात्मकार्य बहु साधे

सौम्यमूर्ति शोभाकरण क्षमाधरण गंभीरमति, भट्टारक सोहि जाणिये कहत ज्ञानसागर यति

, lit. '९'

Bhaṭṭāraka sōhi jāṇa bhraṣṭācara nivārē, dharma prakāśē dōi bhavika jīva bahu tārē| Sakala śastra sampūrṇa sūrimantra ārādhē, karē gaccha uddhāra svātmakārya bahu sādhē| Saumyamūrti śōbhākaraṇa kṣamādharaṇa gambhīramati, bhaṭṭāraka sōhi jāṇiyē kahata jñānasāgara yati.

"Thus a bhaṭṭāraka illuminates both dharmas, is an expert in all scriptures, has the authority to recite the suri-mantra (to consecrate an image). He is also responsible for preserving the order. He is the head of the six limbs of the sangha: shravaka, shravika, pandita (brahma), muni (maha vrati), aryika and Bhattaraka."

Many of the bhattarakas were prolific authors. They wrote hundreds of original books and commentaries on various subjects, in Sanskrit and in local languages. All existing Jain manuscripts available today owe their preservation to the libraries maintained by Bhattarakas. They trained and supported pandits. Until modern times, all pratishthas were supervised by them or pandits (such as Raighu)designated by them.

== Present Bhattaraka Seats ==
Once bhaṭṭārakas were common all over India, but currently, they are present only in South India, with the exception of a new Bhattaraka seat at Hastinapur. Famous bhaṭṭāraka seats include:

=== Karnataka ===
- Jain Matha, Shravanabelgola, seat of the Desiya Gana, Pustaka Order. The bhaṭṭāraka is named Charukirti. This is where the Siddhanta Granthas were once preserved in the library, before they were moved to Mudabidri.
- Moodabidri, also a very important great holy seat of the Desiya Gana, Pustaka Order. The bhaṭṭāraka is named Charukirti. The original manuscripts of the Siddhanta Granthas like Dhavala are preserved here. The present swamiji is very much experienced most popular India and abroad scholar, master's degree, doctorate holder in various subjects. On 29 August 1999 swamiji took charge of holy bhattarak seat; it is independent holy ancient jain digamber acharya seat.
- Humbaj, seat of Balatkara Gana, Sarasvati Order. The bhaṭṭāraka is named Devendrakirti. This is the original seat of the order which once had branches all north India from Idar in Gujarat to Shikharji in Jharkhand
- Narasimharajapura
- Karkala
- Kanakagiri Jain Matha
- Amminabhavi
- Kambadahalli
- Sonda Jain Math

=== Maharashtra ===
- Nandani, seat of the Sena Gana, Pushakara Order. The bhaṭṭāraka is named Jinasena. Acharya Shantisagar belonged to this tradition.
- Kumbhoj
- Kolhapur

=== Tamil Nadu ===
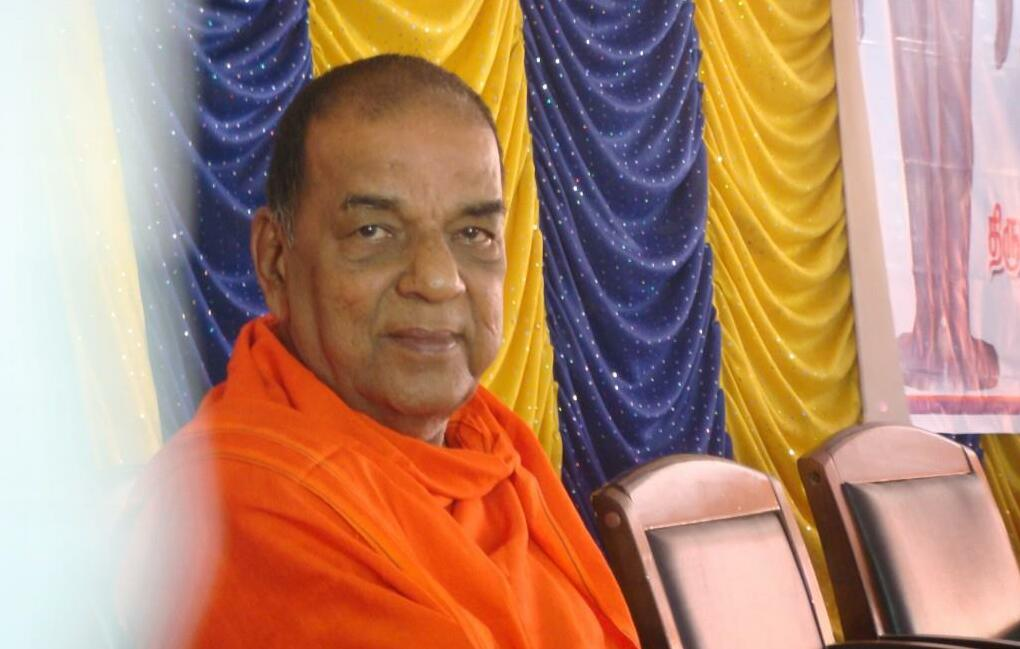
Bhattaraka Laxmisena of the Jinakanchi Jain Math

- Bhattaraka Lakshmisena of the Jinakanchi Jain Math (also known as the Mel Sithamur Jain Math), who heads the Tamil Jains.

=== Uttar Pradesh ===
- Ravindrkirti Swami of Jammudeep tirth Hastinapur

== Historical Bhattaraka Seats ==
Bhaṭṭāraka seats existed at the following places until recent centuries:

1. North India: Delhi, Hisar, Haryana, Mathura
2. Rajasthan: Jaipur, Nagaur, Ajmer, Chittorgarh, Pratapgarh, Rajasthan, Dungarpur, Narsimhapur, Rishabhdeo, Mahavirji
3. Madhya Pradesh: Gwalior, Sonagiri, Ater, Chanderi, Sironj, Rehli, Panagar
4. Gujarat: Idar, Sagwada, Surat, Bhanpur, Sojitra, Kalol, Jerhat
5. Maharashtra: Karanja, Nagpur, Latur, Nanded, Kolhapur, Nandani
6. Andhra Pradesh: Penukonda
7. Karnataka: Malakheda, Karkala, Swadi

The Terapanth movement arose in 17th century because of opposition by elite householders to Bhattarakas. Still many Bhaṭṭāraka seats in North India existed until the beginning of the 20th century. In some locations disputes arose and the reformists opposed existing Bhattarakas because they did not display the scholarship expected, or disapproval of their spending of the institutional funds. Many Bhattarakas were unable to find suitable disciples to take their place after them.

A new Bhattaraka seat has again come into existence at Hastinapur presided by Bhattaraka Ravindra Kirti.

== Theories of Origin ==
There are several theories of how the modern Bhattarka institution originated.

In its modern form, with the Bhattaraka as an orange-robed advanced layman, its founding is often attributed to Prabhachandra of Mula Sangh, Balatkara Gana Saraswati gachchha, who travelled from Pattana (Gujarat) to Delhi, where he was anointed in a ceremony as the first Bhattaraka of Delhi. He was invited by the ruler of Delhi, who is identified as Muhammad Bin Tughlaq.

However Shrutasagara, in his commentary on Shatprabhrita, mentioned Prabhachandra's predecessor Vasantakirti as having adopted body coverage first. The lineage linking Vasabtakirti and Prabhachandra is given as following (see Balatkara Gana):

1. Vasantakirti at Mandapadurg
2. Vishalakirti (or Prakhyatkirti), Ajmer
3. Shubhakirti, Ajmer
4. Dharmachandra, Ajmer
5. Ratnakirti, Ajmer
6. Prabhachandra, who visited Delhi

Originally the wearing of clothes was regarded to be an exception to be used when going out. Until recent time, many Bhattarakas used to discard clothing within the monastery on specific occasions like eating, image consecretion or initiating another Bhattaraka.

== See also ==
- Mula Sangh
- Kashtha Sangh
- Yati
- Mahatma
