= Digambara Terapanth =

Sub-tradition of Digambara Jainism

Digambara Terapanth is the reform sect of Digambara Jainism that was founded in the 17th century. The older sect came to be termed as the Bispanthi sect.It formed out of strong opposition to the religious domination of bhattarakas, the traditional religious leaders of the establishments. They oppose the worship of various minor gods and goddesses. Some Terapanthi practices, like not using flowers in worship, gradually spread throughout most of North Indian Jainism as well.

== Origin ==
The Terapanthi movement was born out of the Adhyatma movement that arose in 1626 AD (V.S. 1683) in Agra. Its leading proponent was Banarasidas of Agra. Adhyatma groups flourished during 1644-1726 in Agra, Lahore and Multan. The poet Dyanatrai was associated with the Adhyatma movement.King Jai Singh II (1688–1743) of Amer kingdom built separate temples for the two sub-sects in his newly established capital of Jaipur.

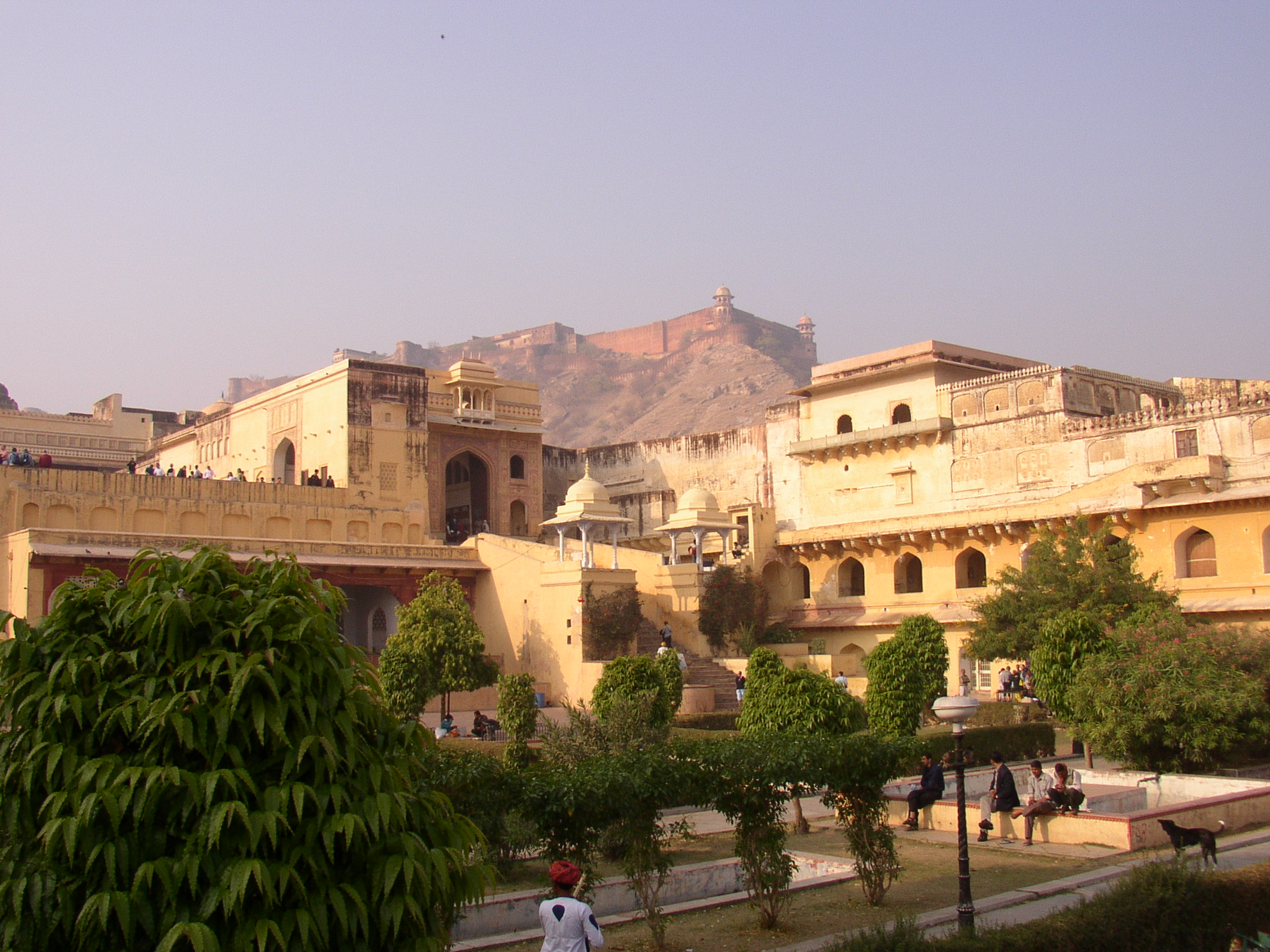
Amber Town, Jaipur

The Bispanth-Terapanth division among the Digambaras emerged in the 17th century in the Jaipur region: Sanganer, Amer and Jaipur itself.

Terapanth was formally founded by Amra Bhaunsa Godika and his son Jodhraj Godika, prominent citizens in Sanganer, during 1664-1667. They expressed opposition to Bhattaraka Narendrakirti of Amber. Authors such as Daulatram Kasliwal and Pandit Todarmal were associated with the Terapanth movement. Pandit Todarmal's son, Gumaniram, formed a sub-sect named Gumanapantha in 1770s and named it shuddha terapantha amana (pure terapantha tradition) by making the rules stricter.

Bakhtaram in his "Mithyatva Khandan Natak" (1764) mentions that group that started it included 13 individuals who collectively built a new temple, thus giving it its name Terapanth, which literally means "thirteen-panthan". Alternatively, according to "Kavitta Terapanth kau" by Chanda Kavi, the movement was named Terapanth because it founders disagreed with the Bhattaraka on thirteen points. A letter of 1692 from Terapanthis at Kama to those at Sanganer mentions 13 rituals practices they rejected.

The Terapanthis reject these practices: Mentioned in Buddhivilas (1770) of Bakhtaram:

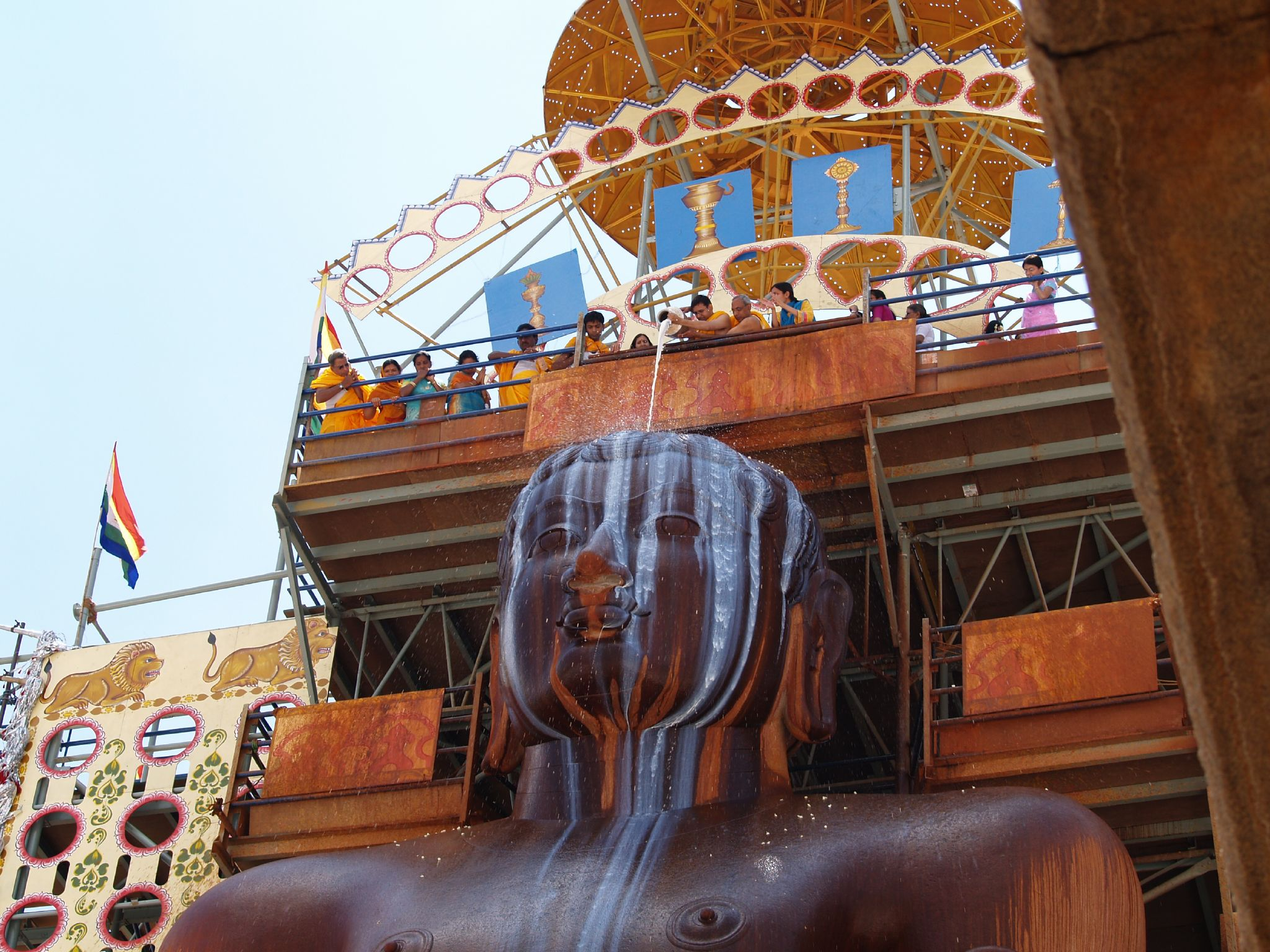
Bisapanthi Abhisheka at Shravanabelagola

- Authority of Bhattarakas
- Use of flowers, cooked food or lamps in worship.
- Abhisheka (panchamrita)
- consecration of images without supervision by the representatives of Bhattarakas.

The letter by Tera Panthis at Kama also mentions:

- Puja while seated
- Puja at night
- Using drums in the temple

Terapanth Khandan of Pandit Pannalal also mentions:

- Worship of minor gods like the guardians of the directions, śāsanadevis such as Padmavati, and Kshetrapala.

== See also ==
- Jainism

== Sources ==
- Wiley, Kristi L. (2009), The A to Z of Jainism, vol. 38, Scarecrow, ISBN 978-0-8108-6337-8
