= Outline of Jammu and Kashmir =

Union territory of India

Location of Jammu and Kashmir

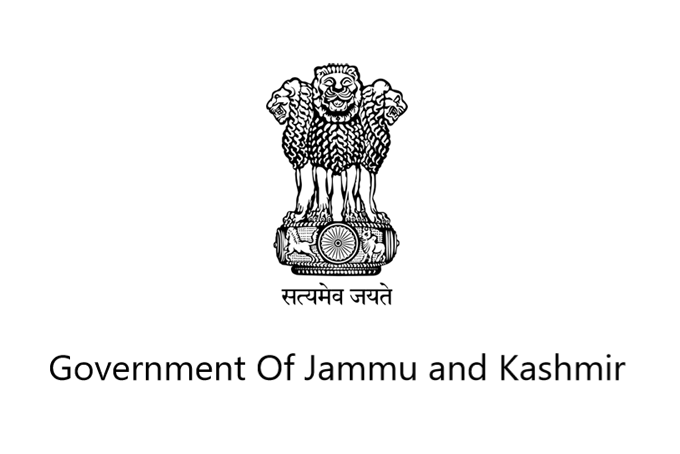
Banner of Jammu and Kashmir

The following outline is provided as an overview of and topical guide to Jammu and Kashmir:

Jammu and Kashmir – is a region administered by India as a union territory. Until 2019, it was the name of a larger region administered by India as a state. Often denoted by the acronym J&K, it is mostly in the Himalayan mountains.

== General reference ==
=== Names ===
- Common English name: Jammu and Kashmir
  - Pronunciation: /ˈdʒæmuː ... kæʃˈmɪər/ JAM-oo ... kash-MEER, also /ˈdʒʌmuː -/ JUM-oo - and /- ˈkæʃmɪər/ - KASH-meer
- Official English name(s): Jammu and Kashmir
- Adjectivals
  - Jammu
  - Kashmiri
- Demonyms
  - Jammuite
  - Kashmiris

=== Rankings (amongst India's states) ===
- by population: 19th (2011 census)
- by area: 5th (2011 census)
- by crime rate: 16th (2016)
- by gross domestic product (GDP) (2014): 20th
- by Human Development Index (HDI): 0.684 (17th) (2017)
- by life expectancy at birth: 72.6 years (2010–14)
- by literacy rate: 67%

== Geography of Jammu and Kashmir ==
Geography of Jammu and Kashmir

- Jammu and Kashmir is: a region administered by India as a union territory
- Population of Jammu and Kashmir: 9,944,283 (2011)
- Area of Jammu and Kashmir: 42,241 km^{2} (16,309 sq mi)
- Atlas of Jammu and Kashmir

=== Location of Jammu and Kashmir ===
- Jammu and Kashmir is situated in the north of India
- Time zone: Indian Standard Time (UTC+05:30)

=== Regions of Jammu and Kashmir ===
- Jammu
- Kashmir
- Districts of Jammu and Kashmir

==== Municipalities of Jammu and Kashmir ====
- Cities of Jammu and Kashmir
  - Capital of Jammu and Kashmir:
    - Summer capital: Srinagar
    - Winter capital: Jammu

=== Demography of Jammu and Kashmir ===
Demographics of Jammu and Kashmir

- Dogras
- Kashmiri Muslims
- Kashmiri Pandit
- Balti people
- Kashmiri diaspora

== Government and politics of Jammu and Kashmir ==
- Politics of Jammu and Kashmir
- Form of government: Indian state government (parliamentary system of representative democracy)
- Capital of Jammu and Kashmir:
  - Summer capital: Srinagar
  - Winter capital: Jammu
  - Darbar Move
- Elections in Jammu and Kashmir

=== Union government in Jammu and Kashmir ===
- Rajya Sabha members from Jammu and Kashmir

=== Branches of the government of Jammu and Kashmir ===
- Government of Jammu and Kashmir
  - Kashmir Administrative Service

==== Executive branch of the government of Jammu and Kashmir ====
- Head of state: Governor of Jammu and Kashmir
- Head of government: Chief Minister of Jammu and Kashmir

==== Legislative branch of the government of Jammu and Kashmir ====
Jammu and Kashmir Legislature

- Jammu and Kashmir Legislative Assembly
- Jammu and Kashmir Legislative Council

==== Judicial branch of the government of Jammu and Kashmir ====
- High Court of Jammu and Kashmir

=== Law and order in Jammu and Kashmir ===
- Constitution of Jammu and Kashmir
- Human rights in Jammu and Kashmir
- Law enforcement in Jammu and Kashmir
  - Jammu and Kashmir Police
  - Crowd control in Jammu and Kashmir
  - Jammu and Kashmir State Vigilance Commission
  - Public Safety Act, 1978

== History of Jammu and Kashmir ==
- History of Kashmir

=== History of Jammu and Kashmir, by period ===
==== Ancient Jammu and Kashmir ====
- Kashyapa
- Dynasties of ancient Kashmir
- Kambojas
- Karkoṭa Empire
  - Lalitaditya Muktapida
- Didda
- Durrani Empire

==== Medieval Jammu and Kashmir ====
- Rajatarangini
- Zain-ul-Abidin
- Shah Mir Dynasty
- Chak dynasty

==== Colonial Jammu and Kashmir ====
- Sikh Empire
  - First Anglo-Sikh War
- Dogra State
  - Gulab Singh
- Jammu and Kashmir (princely state)
- Jammu and Kashmir State Forces
- All India Kashmir Committee

==== Contemporary Jammu and Kashmir ====
- Kashmir conflict
  - Timeline of the Kashmir conflict
  - Indo-Pakistani wars and conflicts
  - Insurgency in Jammu and Kashmir
  - Peacebuilding in Jammu and Kashmir
  - Human rights in Jammu and Kashmir
  - Women's rights in Jammu and Kashmir
  - Media in Jammu and Kashmir
  - Article 370
  - Jammu and Kashmir Reorganisation Bill, 2019

=== History of Jammu and Kashmir, by region ===
- History of Kashmir
- History of Jammu
- History of Poonch District

== Culture of Jammu and Kashmir ==
Culture of Kashmir

- Cuisine of Jammu and Kashmir
  - Wazwan
- Kashmiri literature
  - Phiran
  - Cashmere wool
  - Jammu dress
  - Kanger
- Music of Jammu and Kashmir
- Kashmiriyat
- Kashmiri Pandit Festivals
- Jammu and Kashmir Academy of Art, Culture and Languages
- Monuments in Jammu and Kashmir
  - Monuments of National Importance in Jammu and Kashmir
  - State Protected Monuments in Jammu and Kashmir
- Architecture of Jammu and Kashmir

=== Art in Jammu and Kashmir ===
- Music of Jammu and Kashmir

=== People of Jammu and Kashmir ===
- People from Jammu and Kashmir
  - List of Kashmiri Pandits

=== Religion in Jammu and Kashmir ===
Religion in Jammu and Kashmir

- Hinduism in Jammu and many parts of Chenab Valley
- Islam in Kashmir
- Buddhism in Kashmir
- Kashmir Shaivism

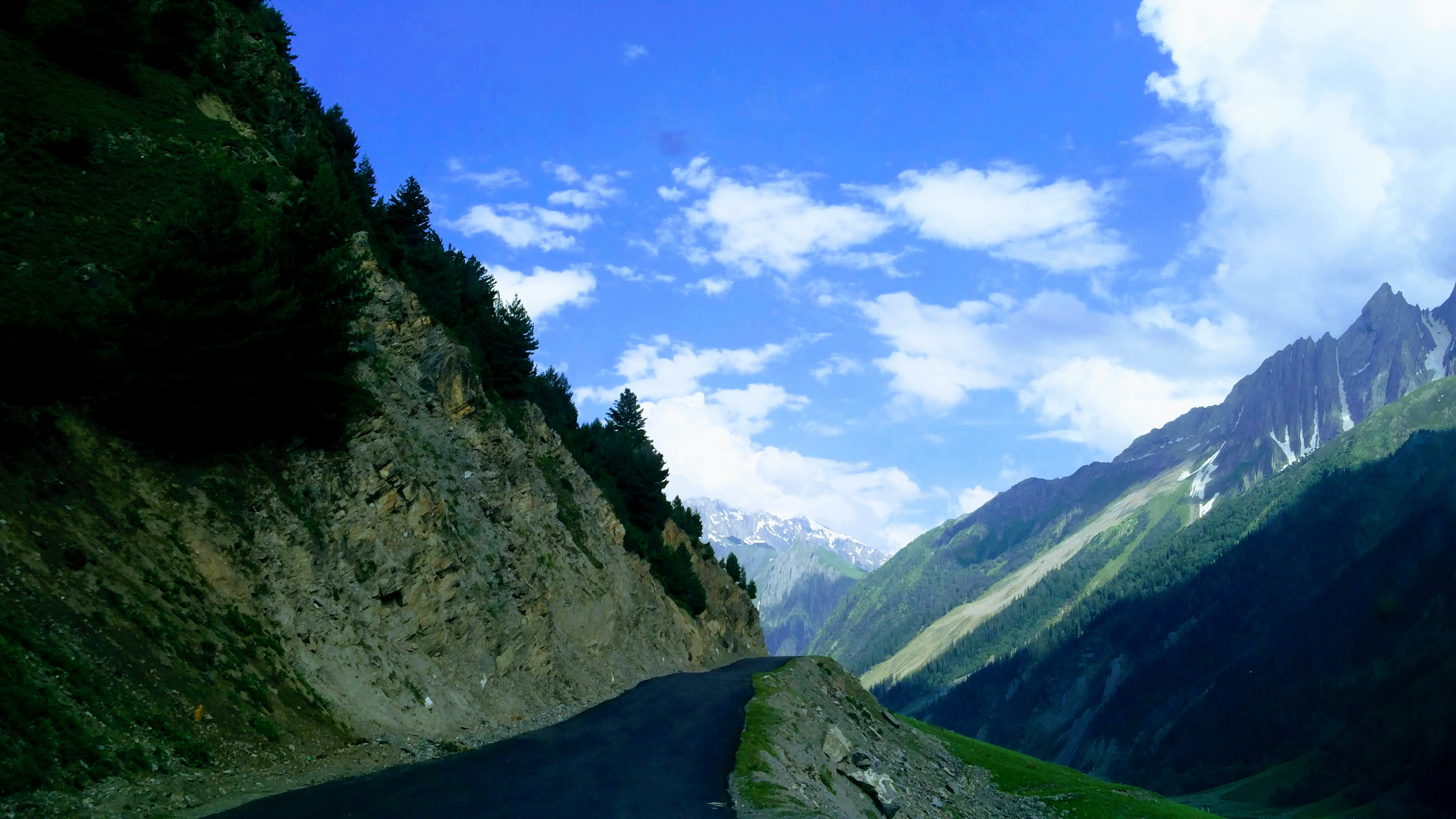
View of Amarnath Valley

- Amarnath

=== Sports in Jammu and Kashmir ===
Sports in Jammu and Kashmir

- Cricket in Jammu and Kashmir
  - Jammu and Kashmir Cricket Association
  - Jammu and Kashmir cricket team
- Football in Jammu and Kashmir
  - Jammu and Kashmir Football Association
  - Jammu and Kashmir football team

=== Symbols of Jammu and Kashmir ===
Symbols of Jammu and Kashmir

== Economy and infrastructure of Jammu and Kashmir ==
Economy of Jammu and Kashmir

- Tourism in Jammu and Kashmir

== Education in Jammu and Kashmir ==
Education in Jammu and Kashmir

- Institutions of higher education in Jammu and Kashmir
- Jammu and Kashmir State Board of School Education
- Indian Institute of Skiing and Mountaineering, Gulmarg
- Central Institute of Buddhist Studies, Leh

== Health in Jammu and Kashmir ==
Health in Jammu and Kashmir
