= Sidhra =

- Town
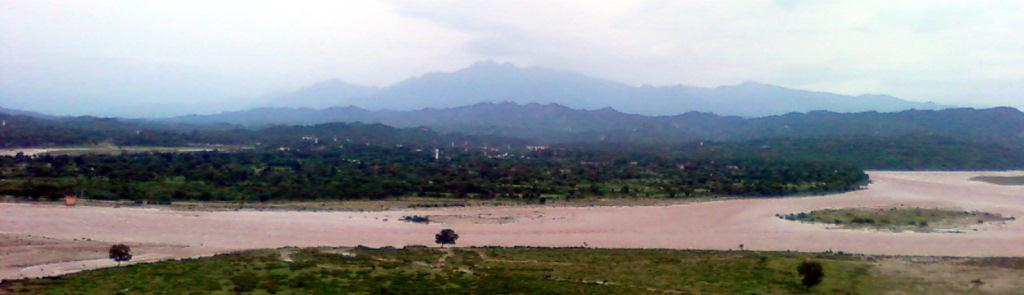
- Tawi River as seen from Sidhra

- Location within Jammu and Kashmir
- Coordinates: 32.76°N 74.89°E
- Country: India
- Union Territory: Jammu and Kashmir
- District: Jammu

Government
  - Type: Municipality
  - Body: Jammu Municipal Corporation
- Elevation: 400 m (1,300 ft)

Population
  - Total: ≈3,000–5,000

Languages
  - Official: Hindi, Urdu, Kashmiri, Dogri
  - Spoken: Kashmiri, Dogri, Hindi, Gojri
- Time zone: UTC+5:30 (IST)
- Postal code: 180019
- Vehicle registration: JK02

Sidhra is a town and municipality in the city of Jammu in the Indian Union Territory of Jammu and Kashmir.

== Geography ==
Sidhra is located on the foothills of the Shivalik Hills and is situated on the banks of the Tawi River. Jammu–Srinagar National Highway or NH-44 goes through this town. The Tawi Bridge connects it with Old City, while the highway from the opposite direction connects it with the new city.

== Demographics ==
Sidhra has mixed demography, where people from Hindu, Muslim, Buddhist and Sikh community have lived peacefully. People from across J&K and Ladakh have settled in Sidhra. Many people from Kashmir Valley have settled here because of unrest in the valley, whereas others from Chenab valley and other far-flung areas of Jammu Division have settled here for better environment, educational facilities and infrastructure available in Jammu city. People from Jammu as well have moved into suburban areas like Sidhra. Some Kashmiri & Ladakhis have made this area their second home or winter home. They settle here for six months during winters and go back during summers.

As of date, there is no official census available to ascertain the religious distribution of population of Sidhra.

== Illegal Settlements ==
Over the years, people from Kashmir, Chenab Valley, Poonch and Rajouri districts have settled in Sidhra on the outskirts of Jammu, as part of land allocations under Roshni Act. Inasmuch as it provided better opportunities of education and other facilities, it also led to accusations of change in existing demographics in the region, with the claim that 90% of the beneficiaries being from Muslim community. Questions were raised on the legality of land granted under Roshni Act. After a campaign by Ikkjutt Jammu to highlight the alleged grab of forest land under Roshni Act, in 2018, the then governor of erstwhile state J&K Mr. Satya Pal Malik repealed the act on the grounds that it had failed to realize the desired objectives and there were also reports of misuse of some its provisions.

On 9 October 2020, a division bench of Chief Justice Gita Mittal and Justice Rajesh Bindal held in its judgement that the Roshni Act was completely unconstitutional, contrary to law and unsustainable, thereby declaring all land allocations done under it as null and void. The court declared all transfers of land done even before the repeal of Roshni Act are invalid, holding that J&K State Land Act 2001 (vesting of ownership to Occupants) was void ab initio from its very inception, thus rendering the settlements in Bathindi, Sunjawan, Sidhra and elsewhere under Roshni Act as illegal. Further, the Jammu and Kashmir High Court on 9 October 2020 ordered a CBI probe in the Roshni land scam case, stating it to be the biggest ever in the history of Jammu and Kashmir, and allegedly involving a loss of Rs 25,000-Crores for the State exchequer.

== Sri Venkateswara Balaji Temple ==
The Tirumala Tirupati Devasthanams (TTD) has constructed Sri Venkateswara Balaji Temple in Majeen area of Sidhra in Jammu, making it the sixth Balaji temple constructed outside Andhra Pradesh and Telangana. It cost Rs 30 crore to construct the temple and it was completed in a period of two years. The temple was inaugurated by Lieutenant governor of J&K Manoj Sinha, Union ministers Dr Jitendra Singh and G Kishen Reddy on 8 June 2023. The temple is spread over 62 acres of land, making it one of the largest temples in the Jammu region. Temple falls on the route between Jammu and Katra, where Mata Vaishno Devi temple is located and is expected to boost religious tourism in the region. The temple has been crafted in a Dravidian architectural style and showcases influences of the ancient Chola dynasty. The next phase of development is expected to include Kalyana Mandapam, Veda Patashala and a health center.
