= Munawar Abad =

Munawar Abad Munawarabad
- Town
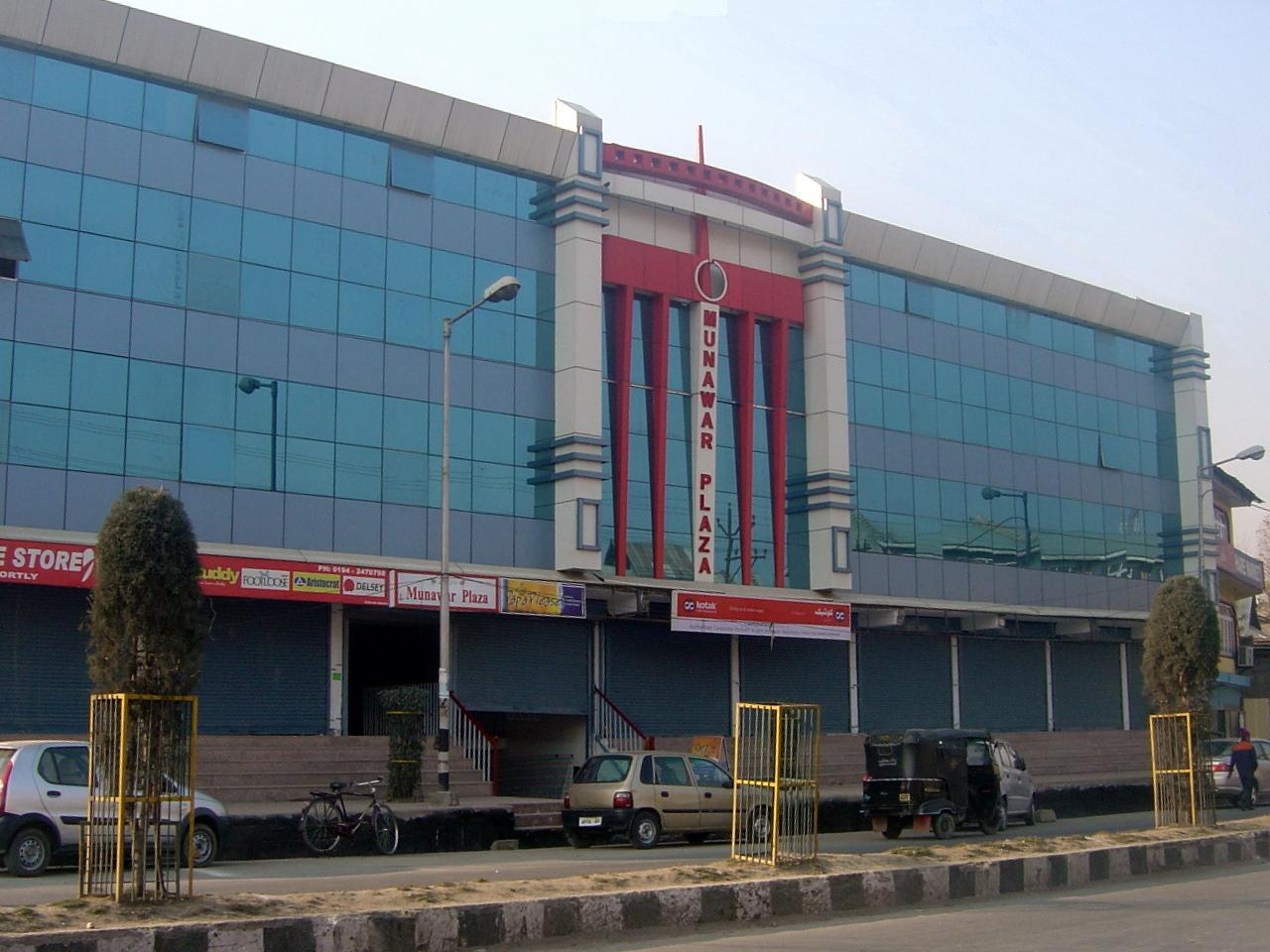
- Munawar Plaza

- Location in Jammu and Kashmir, India Munawar Abad (India)
- Coordinates: 34.083465°N 74.819158°E
- Country: India
- Union territory: Jammu and Kashmir
- District: Srinagar

Government
  - Body: Srinagar Municipal Corporation
- Elevation: 1,730 m (5,680 ft)

Languages
  - Official: Kashmiri, Urdu, Hindi, Dogri, English
- Time zone: UTC+5:30 (IST)
- PIN: 190001
- Telephone code: 0194
- Vehicle registration: JK
- Nearest city: Jammu
- Literacy: 95%
- Vidhan Sabha constituency: Habba Kadal
- Civic agency: Srinagar Municipal Corporation
- Climate: Cool (Köppen)

Munawar Abad, locally known as Muniwar (Munawarabad), is a town located in heart of Srinagar in the Indian union territory of Jammu and Kashmir. It is 2 km from Lal Chowk. Munawar Abad is the main link between downtown Srinagar and central Srinagar.

== More Info ==
Due to its central location, Muniwar is now becoming an important commercial hub of the city. New shopping complexes are being built. Also there are a number of guest houses and hotels which provide accommodation to tourists, students from other states and other people who come to Srinagar for business purposes. Near Baba Demb Road there is Srinagar's biggest furniture market.

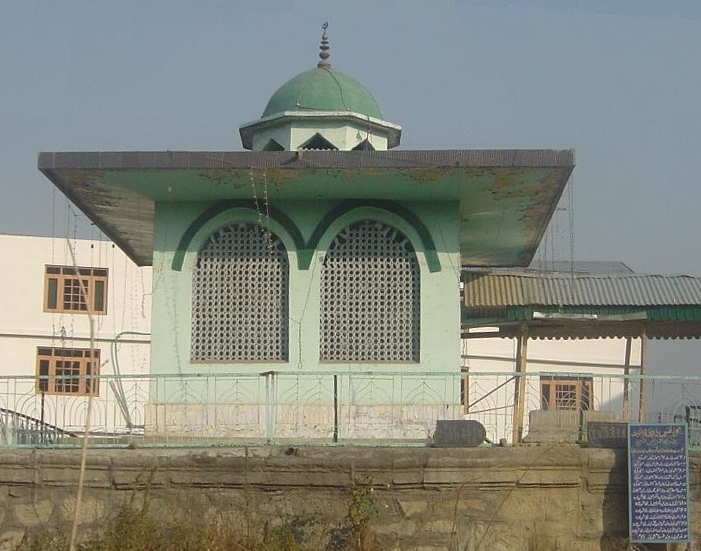
Shrine of Sayed Hussain Khwarzmi

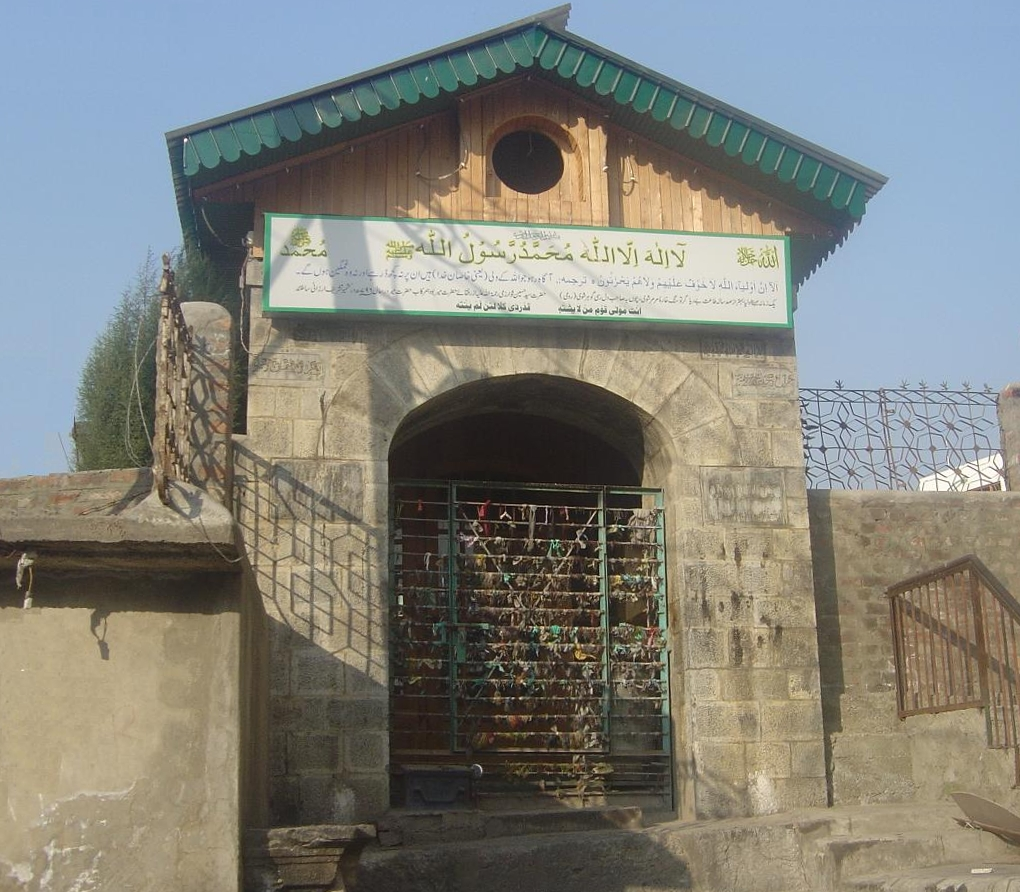
Entrance to shrine

== List of guest houses and hotels ==
- Hotel Downtown (A 4-star, Heritage, Boutique Property)
- Hotel Mughal Palace
- Hotel Dew
- Ikhwan Hotel (Currently occupied by CRPF)
- Rustum Guest House
- Nageena Guest House
- Khybar Hotel
- Hotel Bahar
- Reshi Guest House
- Aman Guest House
- Hotel Azad
- Hotel New Shalimar
- The Red Chillies Restaurant
- Hotel Rejent
- Hotel samar

== Educational institutions ==
- SMD High School
- Al-Huda Public School
- Kamla Nehru School (B.B.Shah)
- Darasgah Taleem-ul-Quran (Munawarabad)
- Dar-ul-uloom Dawoodiah
- Maktab i Emamia
- Maktab (ithna-ashari) affiliated with Tanzeemul-Maktatib.

== See also ==
- List of topics on the land and the people of Jammu and Kashmir
- Kashmiri people
- Kashmiri cuisine
- Kanger
- Kashmiriyat
