= Roshni (disambiguation) =

Roshni is a given name.

It may also refer to

== Media ==
- Roshni (Hadiqa Kiani album), 1999
- Roshni (album), a 2025 album by Ali Zafar
- Roshni (film), a Pakistani film

== See also ==
- Roshni Act
