= Roshni Act =

Jammu and Kashmir State Land (Vesting of Ownership to Occupants) Act, 2001

Jammu and Kashmir Legislature
- Long title: An Act to provide for vesting of ownership rights to occupants of State Land for purposes of generating funds to finance Power Projects in the State.
- Citation: Act No. XII of 2001; Governor Act No. XXXII of 2018
- Territorial extent: Jammu and Kashmir
- Assented to: 9 November 2001
- Commenced: 13 November 2001

Amended by
- Jammu and Kashmir State Lands (Vesting of Ownership to the Occupants) (Amendment) Act, 2004; Jammu and Kashmir State Lands (Vesting of Ownership to the Occupants) (Repeal and Savings) Act, 2018

Summary
- in 2005
- Status: Repealed

Jammu and Kashmir State Land (Vesting of Ownership to Occupants) Act, 2001 commonly known as Roshni Act was promulgated during chief ministership of Farooq Abdullah in 2001. The law granted ownership of Jammu and Kashmir state lands to unauthorised occupants of those lands with the aim of raising money for power projects upon payment of a sum to be determined by the government of Jammu and Kashmir. The cut-off year was set as 1990 by the government of Farooq Abdullah, which was extended to 2004 and again to 2007 by the PDP-Congress led government. The act got the unofficial name of "Roshni Act" from the Jammu and Kashmir government's said plan of using the funds raised from this to fund power projects in the state.

== Report of irregularities and repeal of the act ==
In 2014 Comptroller and Auditor General (CAG) had raised issues of irregularities and, in 2015, the State Vigilance Organisation had charged over 20 government officials with misuse of the act; no one was prosecuted. From 2015 onwards, efforts were made to get back some of the illegally acquired land.

In 2018 the act was repealed during the tenure of the Governor of Jammu and Kashmir Satya Pal Malik who ordered the investigation to be taken over by the Central Bureau of Investigation (CBI).

On 9 October 2020, following demands from IkkJutt Jammu, the Jammu and Kashmir High Court deemed the law and all allotments made since the beginning as "null and void" and "unconstitutional". The court also said that the rules framed in 2007 by the Government of Ghulam Nabi Azad did not appear to have any legislative sanction. The state government has said that it will recover land distributed under the scheme in six months. All the identities of those who took advantage of the scheme were to be made public.

On 22 October 2020, the administration of Jammu and Kashmir Union Territory ordered the submission of comprehensive details of ministers, legislators, bureaucrats, police officers, government employees, businessmen, other influential persons and their relatives who have benefitted from the Act.

On 24 November 2020, India's Union Law Minister Ravi Shankar Prasad in a press conference said that former J&K Chief Minister Farooq Abdullah was among the beneficiaries in Roshni Act. The others in the list were the former Finance Minister of J&K Haseeb Drabu, Congress leader Majid Wani, former Home Minister and NC leader Sajjad Kitchloo and former JK Bank Chairman MY Khan.

== See also ==
- Indira Awaas Yojana
- Sainik Farm
- List of scandals in India
