= Music of Jammu and Kashmir =

Music of Jammu and Kashmir reflects a rich musical heritage and cultural legacy of the Indian-administered union territory of Jammu and Kashmir. Two different regions of Jammu and Kashmir consists the Jammu region and Kashmir Valley. Music of Kashmir has influences of Central Asian music while music from Jammu region is similar to that of other regions of North India.

== Kashmir ==
=== Sufiana Kalam (Kashmiri classical) ===
Sufiana Kalam is the classical music of Kashmir, which uses its own maqams, and is accompanied by the Rubab, the Kashmiri saz, the Santoor, the wasool and the dokra. The dance based on the sofiyiana kalam is the hafiz nagma.

=== Chakri ===
Chakri is one of the most popular types of traditional music played in Jammu & Kashmir. Chakri is a responsorial song form with instrumental parts, and it is played with instruments like the harmonium, the rubab, the sarangi, the Ghatam which is popularly known as Noet In Kashmiri, the geger, the tumbaknaer and the chimta. It is performed in folk and religious spheres, by the Kashmiri Muslims and Kashmiri Pandits. Chakri was also used to tell stories like fairy tales or famous love stories such as Yousuf-Zulaikha, Laila-Majnun, etc. Chakri ends with the rouf, though rouf is a dance form but few ending notes of Chakri which are played differently and on fast notes is also called Rouf. It is a very important part of the Henna Night (Ma'enzi raat) during weddings.

=== Henzae ===
Henzae is a traditional and ancient form of singing which is practiced by Kashmiri Pandits at their festivals. It appears to have archaic features that suggest it is the oldest form of Kashmiri folk singing.

=== Rouf or Wanwun ===
Rouf is a traditional dance form usually performed by women on certain important occasions like marriage and other functions and also in cultural activities.

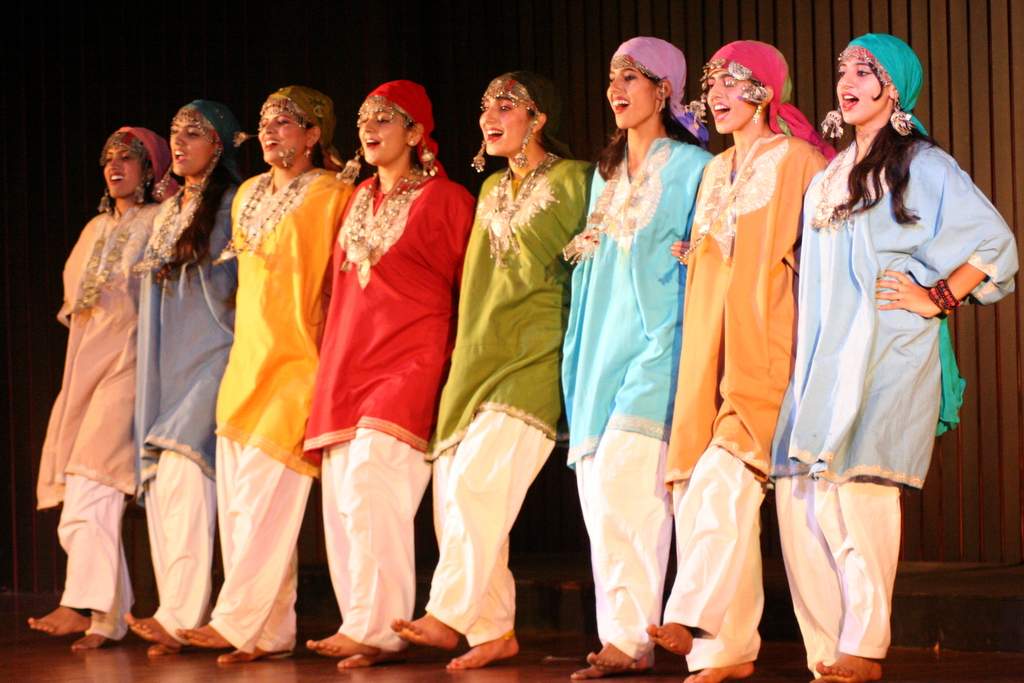
Kashmiri girls performing Rouf Dance in Delhi

=== List of traditional music instruments of Jammu and Kashmir ===
- Rubab: The rabab, or rubab, is about three and a half feet long and has three strings. It is made of mulberry wood, while goat’s intestinal skin is used to make the strings. So, it is believed to bear someone’s soul and hence called Rabab. It came to the valley from Afghanistan. It creates soothing music and is an important part of Kashmir’s music culture.
- Santoor: The santoor is an important accompaniment for Kashmiri folk and Sufiyana music. This instrument is trapezoidal in shape with 12 wires and 12 knobs on the sides.
- Saz-e-Kashmir: It is a stringed instrument, round in shape, decorated using ivory, and played with a bow. It is similar to the violin; creates a soothing sound, and hasn’t undergone major changes since its origin.

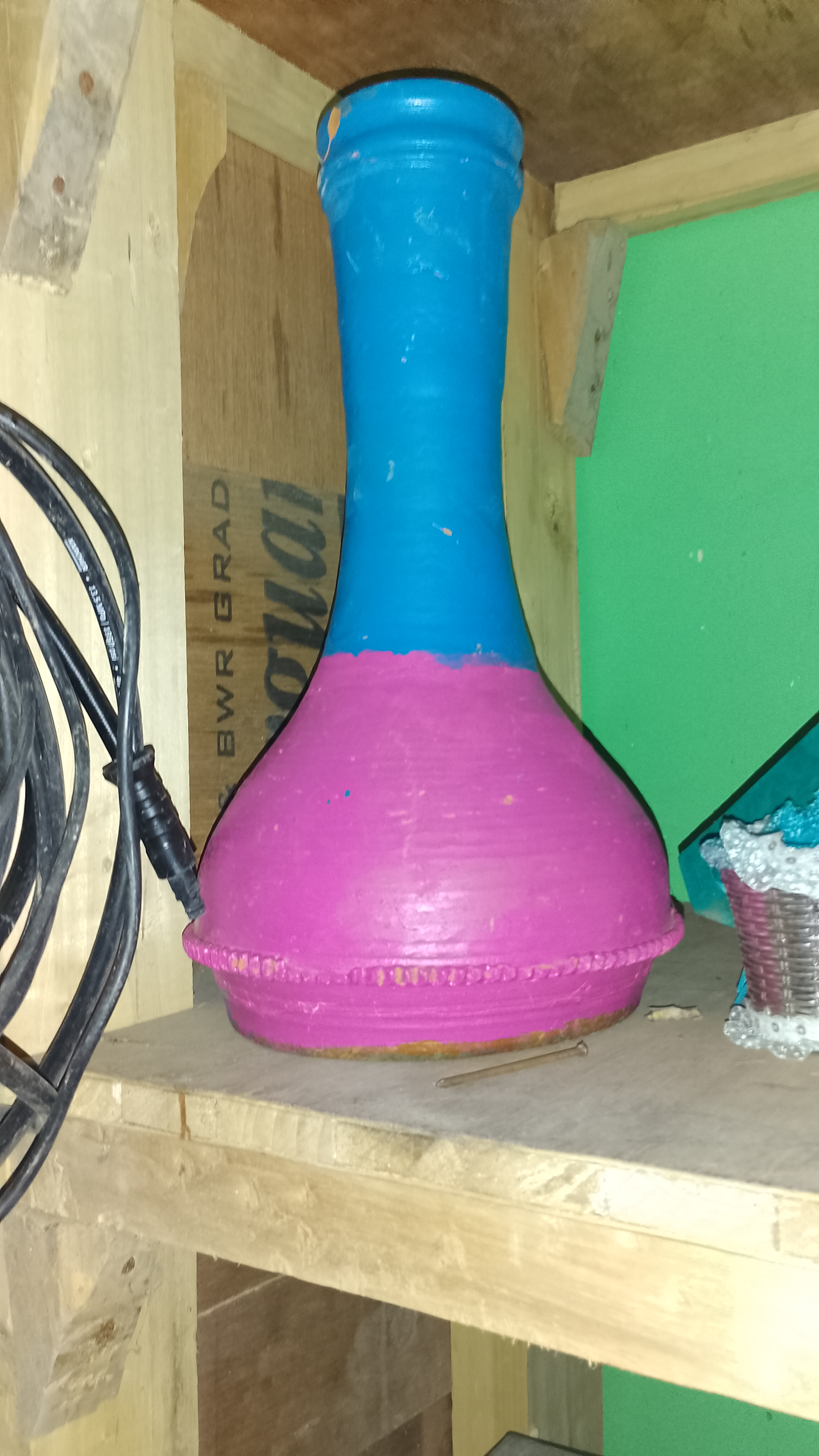
Tumbaknaer

- Tumbaknaer: It is believed to have originated in Iran or Central Asia, from where it came to Kashmir and became an important part of the traditional music of this region. Tumbaknaer is a drum made out of baked clay with its base made from sheep skin. It is played during celebrations, mainly by women. It is said to have been in use since the medieval ages.
- Nout: This traditional musical instrument is a rounded earthen pot with an opening. Nouts used in music are mostly of brass or copper. It is most commonly played during weddings.
- Daf: It is a musical instrument consisting of a round frame with pairs of metal jingles attached to it and a translucent head made of plastic or goat skin. It is mostly played by women in weddings. It is of Iranian origin.
- Sitar: Usually played by folk artists, the Kashmiri Sitar has a long body and 7 strings, and it is smaller in size than other Indian sitars.
- Kashmiri sarang: Similar to the sarangi, though smaller in size, this musical instrument of Jammu and Kashmir is of mulberry or teakwood, hollow from inside and creates soothing, pleasant music. It is used by the folk musicians in Kashmir.
- Surnai: This Kashmiri musical instrument is a wooden pipe around 18 inches in length with 7 outlet holes and one blowing hole and a bell-shaped outlet. There are two types of flutes found in the traditional music of Jammu and Kashmir. One is hollow from inside, has 7 holes for the 7 musical notes, and is played using two hands. The other type called Pi-Pi in Kashmiri, has 7 holes for the 7 swaras but does not have a blowing hole.
- Geger: It is a percussion instrument used as an accompaniment in the traditional music of Jammu and Kashmir. It is a brass or metal vessel on which sounds are created with the use of fingers or rings on fingers. It is often played in Chakri songs.
- Dokra: Also called Wasul or Dolke, was a percussion instrument used as an accompaniment in traditional Kashmiri music. Today, the tabla has taken its place. Tabla consists of two hand drums made of hollowed wood, metal or clay, where one drum is used to create treble and tonal sounds and the other is used to create bass.
- Nagada: It is similar to Dhol and said to be a form of the ancient instrument Dundubhi. Sound is created by striking the nagada with a piece of wood. In Kashmir, this musical instrument is played at weddings and festivals.
- Shankh: It is an ancient Indian instrument which is used to add a religious element to ceremonies and festivals. In Kashmir, the shankh is played at Hindu weddings and at temples. It has been mentioned in the Vedas and the Bhagwat Gita.
- Swarnai: Known as Shahnai in Kashmiri music, it is wooden with nine holes and through a square near its mouth, air is blown to create sound. Swarnai music is melodious and the playing of this musical instrument is considered auspicious. Hindus as well as Muslims play this instrument at weddings and festivals.
- Khasya: At religious gatherings and weddings, two Khasya are played by striking them with each other.
- Thaluz: This traditional musical instrument is a part of the folk culture of Kashmir. It is mainly played at temples during prayers and kirtans.
- Nai Flute

: In Kashmiri language, the normal meaning of ‘Nai’ is related to flute. In Kashmiri folk music, the prevalence of Nai is older than two thousand years as we get its description in Nilamata Purana. "Punyahved shabdin vansi venurvenaya sut magadh shabden tatha vandisvanenc" Nilamata Purana described banshi as well as venu and in the modern era even the Kashmiri artists, especially of Anantnag, are proficient in playing two types of flutes.

1. The first type of flute is empty from inside and there are seven holes for seven musical notes. While playing it, fingers of both the hands are used. This type of flute is more prevalent in the folk life.

2. The second type of flute is also called 'Pi-Pi' in Kashmiri language. This type of flute is made of walnut’s wood. Even this flute has seven holes but the hole from where the air is blown is absent, but its adjacent hole is put into the mouth and blown. The player sees the seven holes clearly. This instrument is used more conveniently and the player does not get tired soon. This type of flute is more famous in Kashmir.

=== Ladishah ===
Ladishah is one of the most important parts of the Kashmiri music tradition. Ladishah is a sarcastic form of singing. The songs are sung resonating to the present social and political conditions and are utterly humorous. The singers move from village to village performing generally during the harvesting period. The songs are composed on the spot on issues relating to that village, be it cultural, social or political. The songs reflect the truth and that sometimes makes the song a bit hard to digest, but they are totally entertaining.

=== Hindustani classical ===
Music and musical instruments find mention in the earliest texts like the Nilmatapurana and Rajatarangini by Kalhana. The very fact that it was a Kashmiri, Abhinavagupta (the great philosopher), who wrote a commentary called Abhinavabharati on Bharata's Natyashatra shows how much importance was given to music in the ancient times. A favorite traditional instrument is the santoor (Shat-tantri-veena), a hundred string percussion instrument which is played by the goddess Sharada (the goddess of learning and art in ancient Kashmir).

Notable santoor players from Jammu and Kashmir include Shivkumar Sharma, from Jammu, and Bhajan Sopori from the Kashmir Valley.

== Jammu division ==
Music in Jammu division is diverse with essence of both mountains and plains. Musical instruments of Jammu include flute, ektara, dafla, sarangi, Chang, narsingha, kansiya etc.

Traditional music includes:

1. Karkan: Songs in praise of martyrs and gurus.
2. Baran: Songs of valour and sacrifice
3. Bhaints: Devotional Songs in praise of Goddesses
4. Bishanpate: Songs in praise of Vishnu or incarnations of Vishnu.
5. Kirtan: Devotional Songs of God.
6. Bihai: Songs sung when a boy child is born
7. Badhai: These are sung in occasions of special ceremonies
8. Ghodi:These are sung when bride's groom wear SEHARA.
9. Suhag: They are sung by women in Bride's house during Feras.
10. Barah Mah: These Songs are the most beautiful one which describe the beauty of 12 months of the year. The themes of World famous BASOHLI PAINTINGS of Jammu are based on these Songs.
11. Lohri geet: These are sung by children when they ask for lohri from elders. They bid adieu to winters. Apart from this there are Gojri Songs which are sung by the Gujjar Bakarwal community. In these songs they describe their hardships of leaving their homes and moving from hills to plains in winters and back to hills in summers. They are in their own local Gojri language. Songs of Jammu division are mix of Dogri Lok geet, Punjabi Geet, Pahadi geet, Bhadarwahi geet and Gojri Geet. Such is the diversity of Jammu division with sugar coated languages and beautiful music of nature.

== See also ==
- Jammu and Kashmir (union territory)
- Culture of Kashmir
- Outline of Jammu and Kashmir
