= Madin Sahib =

15th-century mosque and tomb in Srinagar, Jammu and Kashmir, India

Madin Sahib Mosque
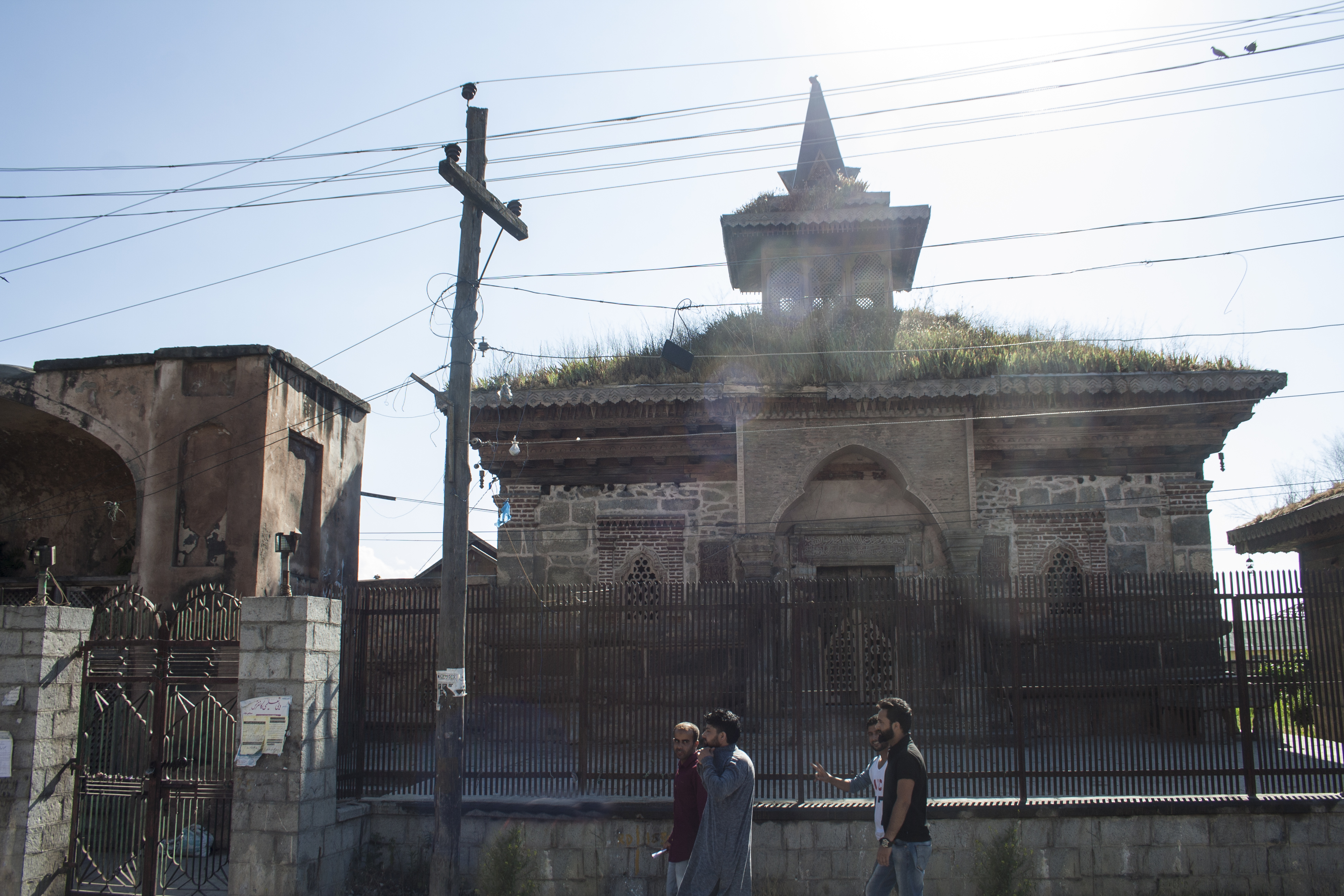
- Madin Sahib Mosque in 2016

- Location of the mosque in Jammu and Kashmir

Religion
- Affiliation: Islam
- Ecclesiastical or organisational status: Mosque and Tomb
- Status: Inactive; (partial ruinous state)

Location
- Location: Zadibal, Srinagar, Jammu and Kashmir
- Country: India
- Interactive map of Madin Sahib Mosque
- Coordinates: 34°07′01″N 74°48′36″E

Architecture
- Type: Mosque architecture
- Founder: Sultan Zain-ul-Abideen
- Established: 1444 CE
- Spire: One (pagoda)
- Reference no.: S-JK-3 (State Protected Monument)

The Madin Sahib Mosque, or the Tomb of Madani, is a historic mosque and tomb located in the Zadibal area of Srinagar, Jammu and Kashmir, India. The complex is associated with Syed Mohammad Madani, a 15th-century religious scholar who settled in Kashmir during the reign of Shah Mir dynasty. The mosque and tomb are traditionally believed to have been built under the patronage of Sultan Zayn al-Abidin in 1444 CE.

The monument is known for its surviving early glazed tilework in several colours, which considered among the important examples of pre-Mughal architectural decoration in Kashmir. The site is listed as a State-protected monument. Because of a long-running administrative dispute between Sunni and Shia communities, the mosque remained closed for worship for long periods during the late 20th and early 21st centuries.

== Location ==
The Madin Sahib Mosque is located in the Zadibal area of Srinagar. Historic sources state that the mosque and tomb complex were built in the larger historic area of Naushahr. The complex includes both the mosque and the tomb of Syed Mohammad Madani.

== History ==
=== Syed Mohammad Madani ===
Syed Mohammad Madani was a religious scholar who came from Medina in Hejaz. Sources state that he arrived Kashmir during the reign of Sultan Sikandar Shah (r. 1389–1413), possibly as a part of an envoy linked to the Central Asian ruler Timur. After arriving in Kashmir, Madani is said to have decided to remain in the Valley and first lived in Rainawari before moving to the Naushahr, the capital of Kashmir Sultanate under Sultan Zayn al-Abidin. Historical accounts state that Sultan Sikandar and later Sultan Zayn al-Abidin supported Madani and helped establish a khanqah for him. Several chronicles state that he became a companion and disciple of Mir Muhammad Hamadani, the son of Mir Sayyid Ali Hamadani. Among Kashmiris, he became popularly known as Madin Saeb.

Syed Moahmmad Madani died on 11 Rajab 849 AH (13 October 1445 CE), his funeral prayer was led by Baha al-Din Ganj Bakhsh, and he was buried at the site of present shrine.

=== Construction of the mosque and tomb ===
The tomb and mosque of Madani was built in 1444 CE under Sultan Zayn al-Abidin's patronage, who is said to have named the complex after his teacher Syed Mohammad Madani.

The complex is one of the few surviving examples of masonry architecture from the Kashmir Sultanate period, when most building in the building were built of timber.

=== Sectarian disputes ===
The shrine became important site to both Sunni and Shia Muslims. Historical sources suggest that the religious affiliation of Syed Mohammad Madani became the subject of dispute among Sunni and Shia communities. Some historical sources note that the inscription Ali-un-Wali-Allah (Ali is the friend of God) formerly appeared above the entrance to the mosque, and was cited by sections of the Shia community as evidence of the shrine's association with Shia tradition.

A Major dispute over the administration of the mosque and shrine took place between the two groups during the 19th century under Dogra rule. According to local accounts, authorities restricted access to the site after communal unrest.

Disputes over management continued into modern times. In 2002, after renewed disagreements between Sunni and Shia groups, the mosque was locked and access to the site was restricted.

== Architecture ==
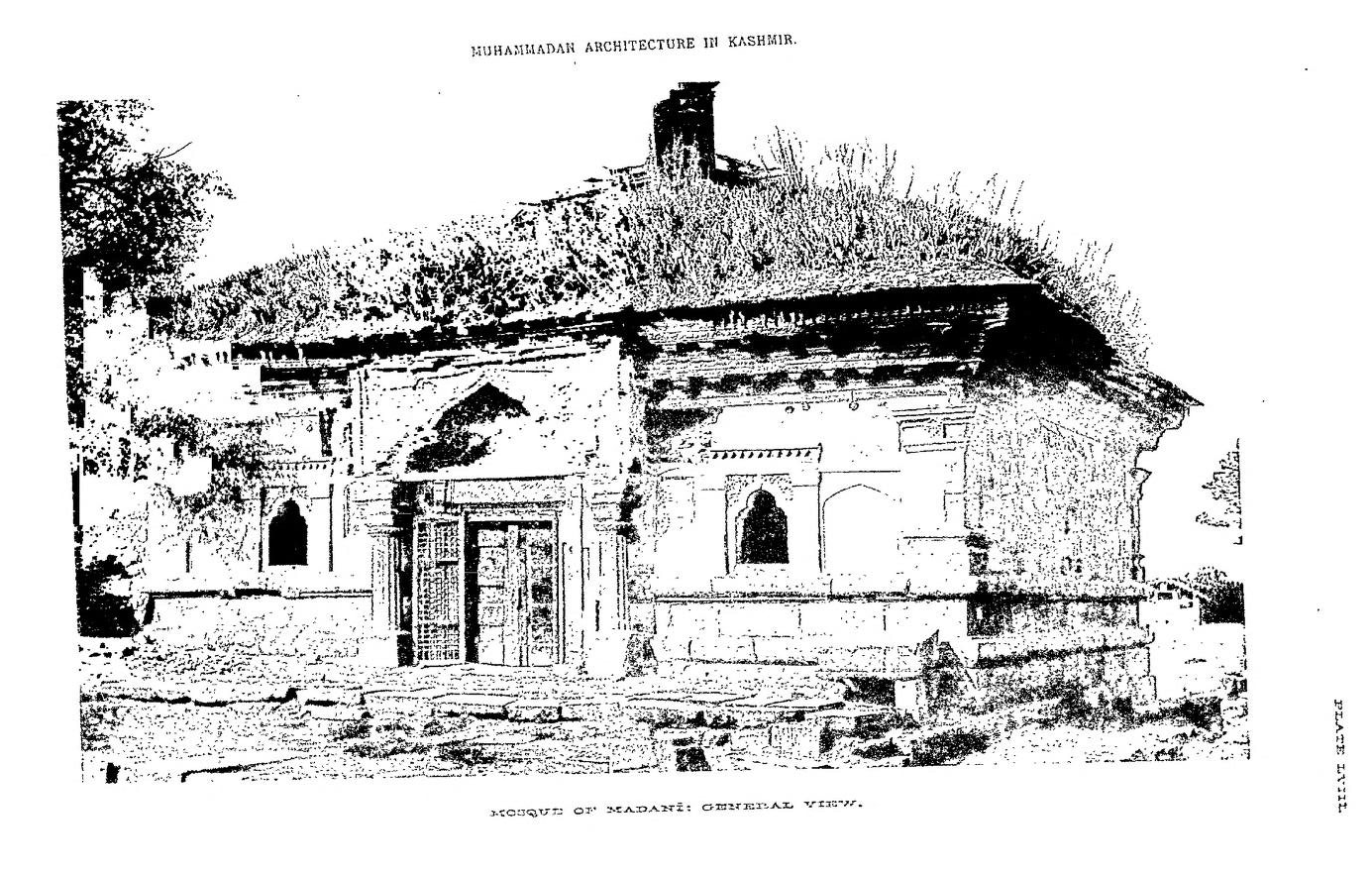
Tomb of Madani from the Annual Report of the Archaeological Survey of India (1906-07)

The Madin Sahib Mosque is one of a small number of surviving masonry monuments from the Kashmir Sultanate period. The building is mainly square in shape and differs from the more common wooden mosques of medieval Kashmir.

Although the monument has suffered damage and partial collapse over time, historical descriptions suggest that it originally consisted of a mosque and an attached tomb enclosure built of brick and masonry.

=== Glazed tilework ===
The most distinct feature of the monument is its colourful glazed tile decoration. Architectural historians have described these tiles as among the finest surviving examples of pre-Mughal tilework in the Indian subcontinent. Unlike the mosaic-style decoration commonly seen in Mughal buildings, the tiles at Madin Sahib were made as square pieces containing several colours on a single tile. Surviving examples include blue, green, yellow, red, and brown.

=== Figurative Imagery ===
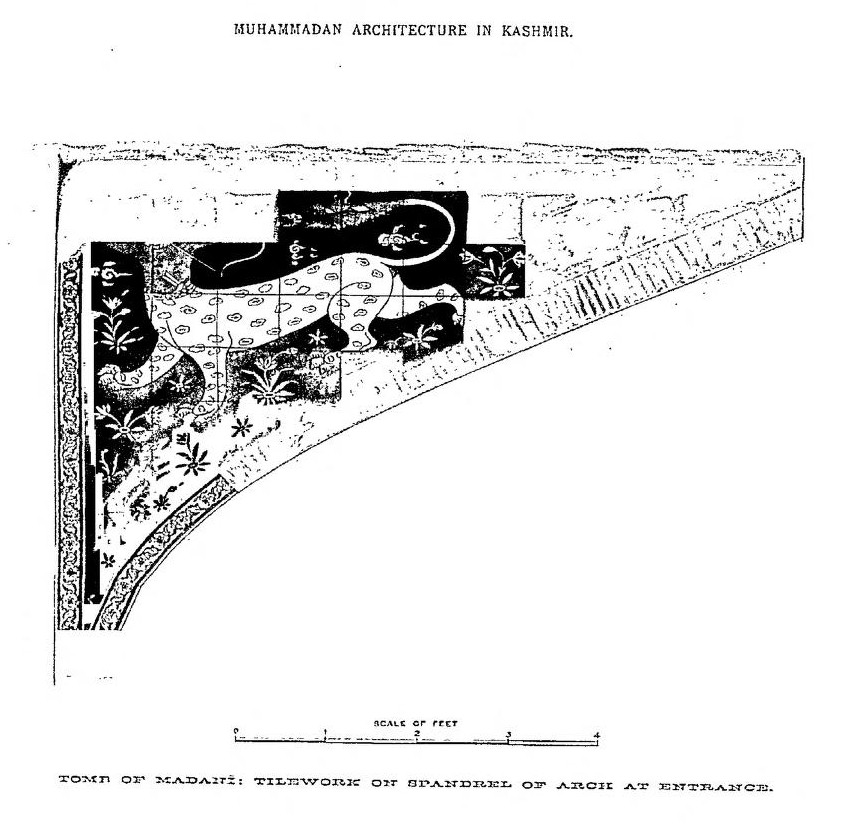
Tilework on spandrel of arch at entrance of Madin Sahib (ASI annual report 1906-7)

Historical descriptions mention that the southern spandrel of the main eastern arch once contained a large multi-coloured image of a mythical creature. Early observers interpreted the figure in different ways, describing it as either a dragon or another mythical animal. Sir John Marshall identified it as a centaur holding a bow. The image reportedly combined a human upper body with the body of a spotted animal and ended in a dragon-like tail. Other decorative elements included flowers, cloud patterns, and a fox-like figure.

Many of the original tiles were later damaged, removed, or transferred to the Shri Pratap Singh Museum in Srinagar for preservation.

== Condition and conservation ==
The Madin Sahib Mosque has long been known to be in poor condition. Archaeologists and historians writing in the late nineteenth and early twentieth centuries described it as neglected and partly ruined.

The loss of much of its original tilework, along with long periods of closure caused by sectarian disputes, contributed to the decline of the structure. Despite being a protected monument, concerns about its conservation and restoration continue to be raised by historians and heritage experts.

== Gallery ==
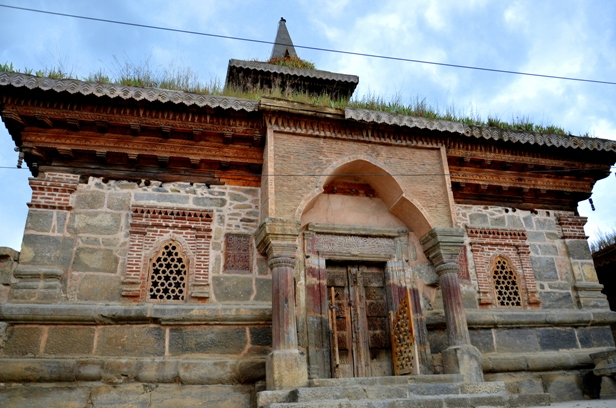
The front of the mosque

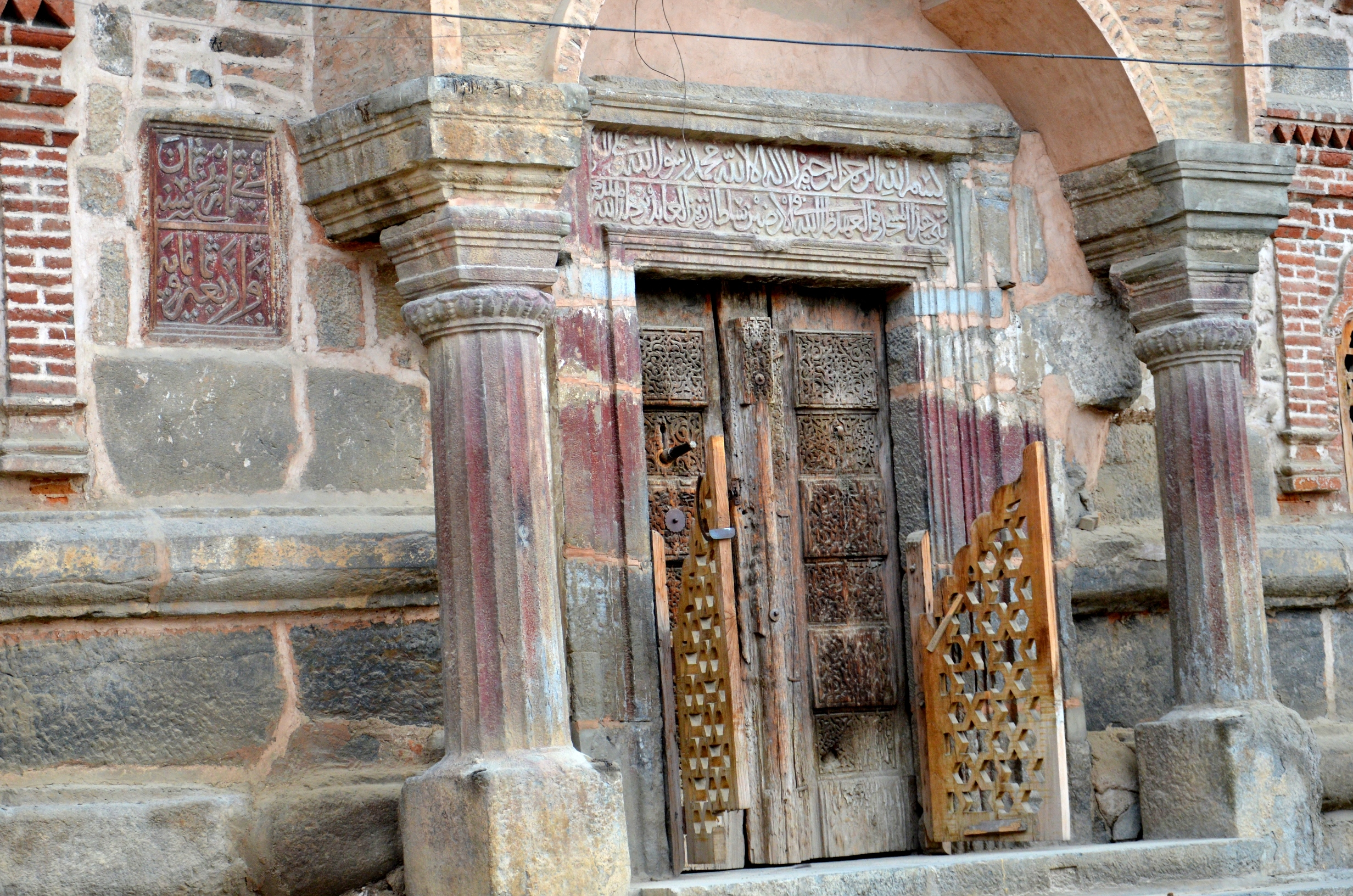
The original writing from the 15th century

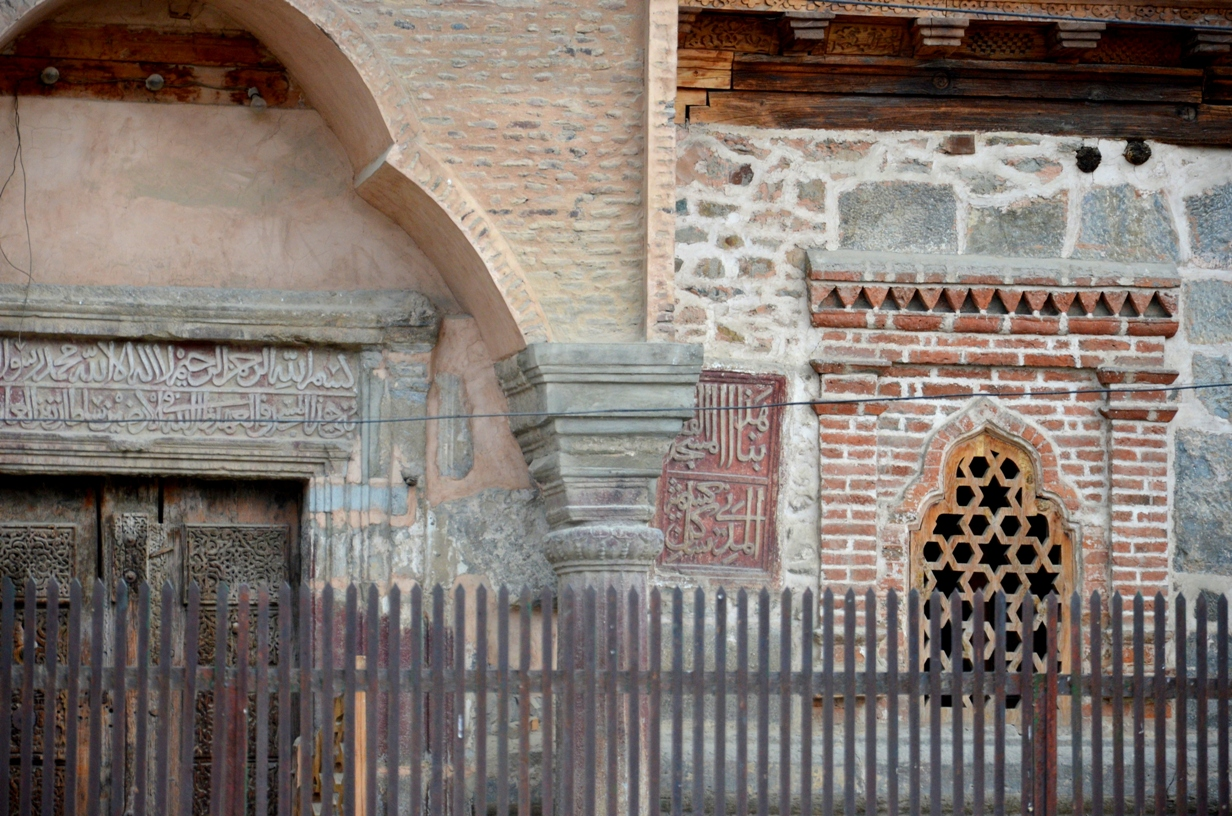
The left side of the front door with recent repairs

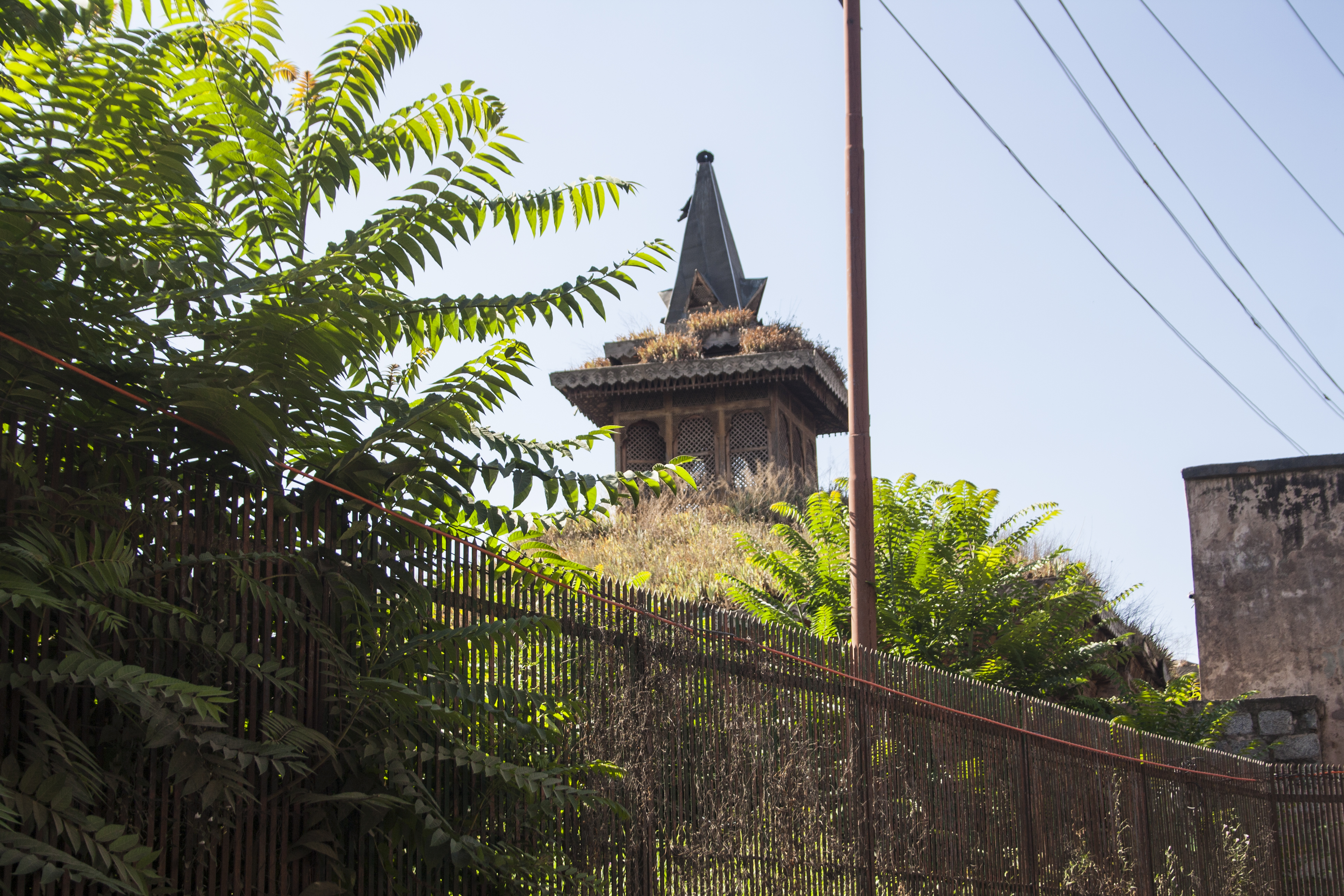
Pagoda spire

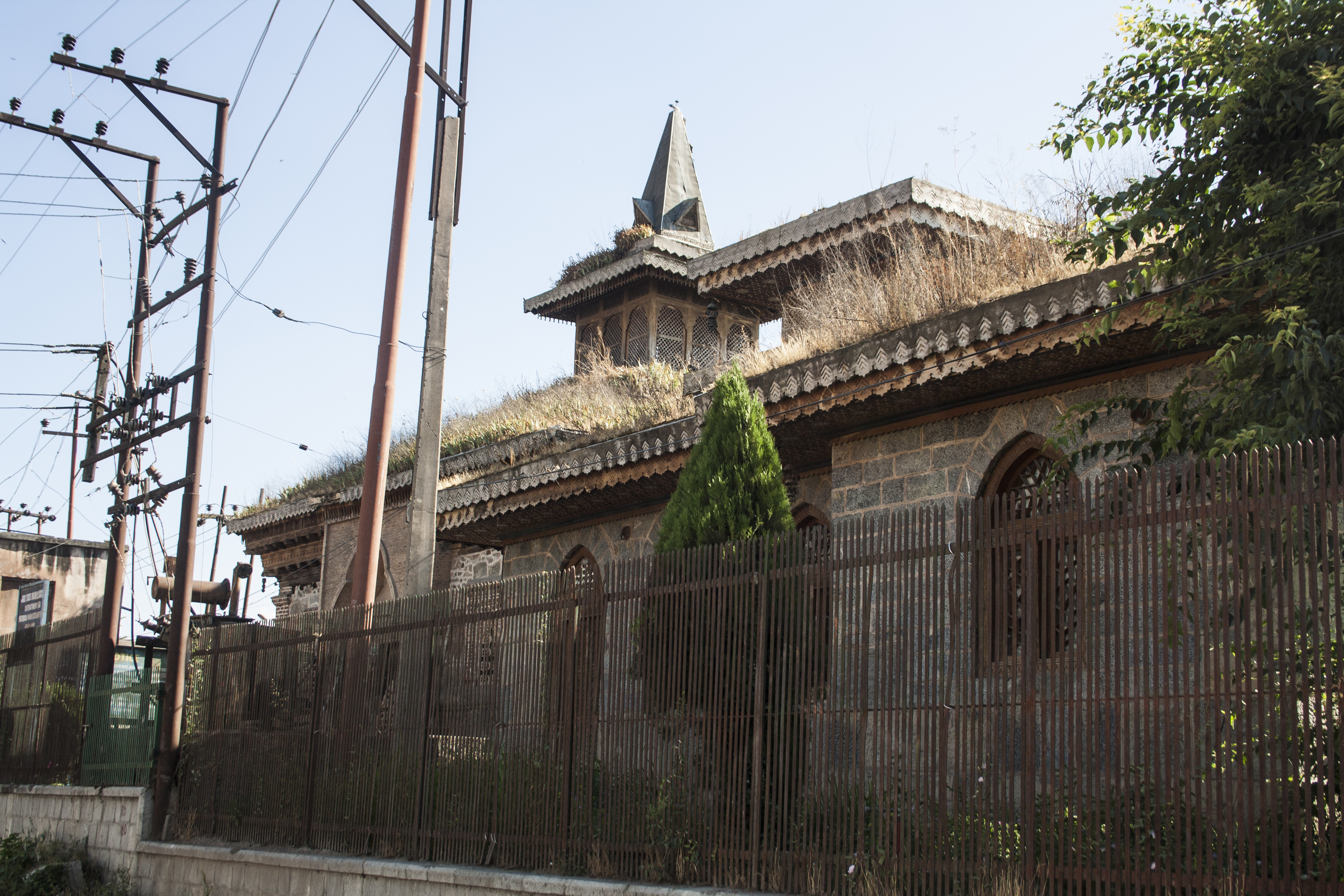
Front of the mosque

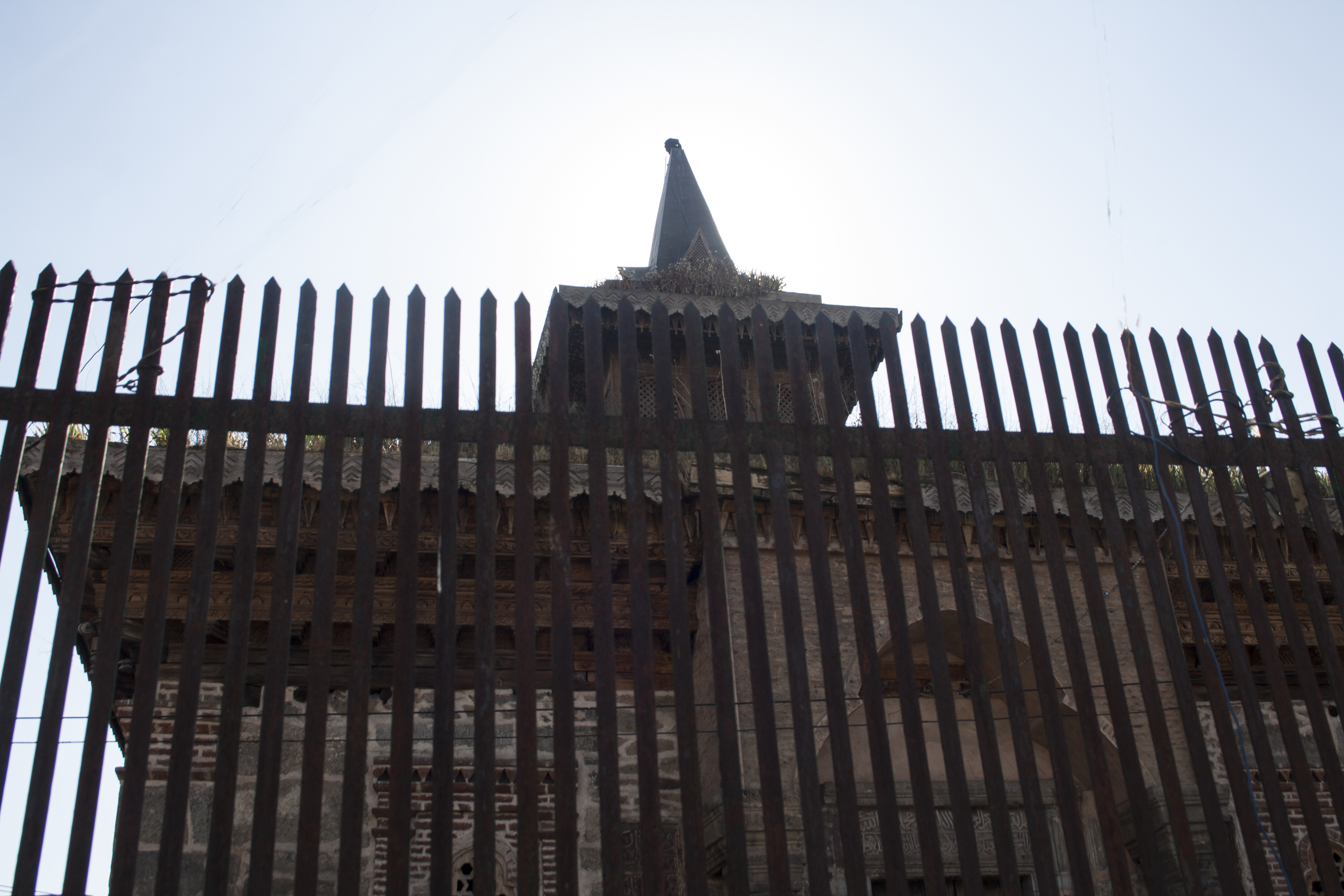
Front of the mosque

== See also ==
- Islam in India
- List of mosques in India
- List of State Protected Monuments in Jammu and Kashmir

== Sources ==
- Archaeological Survey of India (1909) [1906–7]. Annual Report of The Archaeology Survey of India 1906–7. Calcutta Superintendent Government Printing. pp. 10, 166–167, 290–292.
- Khoyihami, Hassan Shah (January 1960). Tazkirah Auliya-e-Kashmir: Tarikh-e-Hasan; Vol. 3 تذکرۂ اولیائے کشمیر (in Urdu). Srinagar, kashmir: Ghulam Mohammad Noor Muhammad Tajiran Kutub. pp. 29–30.
- Didamari, Muhammed Azam (2019) [First published in Persian in 1747]. Waqiat-i-Kashmir (in Urdu). Translated by Ahmad, Shamsuddin. Srinagar: Jammu and Kashmir Islamic Research Center. pp. 77–78.
- Hasan, Mohibbul (2005) [first published 1959], Kashmir Under the Sultans (Reprinted ed.), Delhi: Aakar Books, pp. liii, 23, 140, 426–435, ISBN 978-81-87879-49-7
- Sufi, G.M.D. (1974). Kashir, A History of Kashmir. Vol. 2. Light & Life Publishers. pp. 506–514.
- Sufi, G.M.D. (1979), Islamic Culture in Kashmir, Light & Life Publishers, pp. 212–215, ISBN 9788183390446
