= Economy of Jammu and Kashmir =

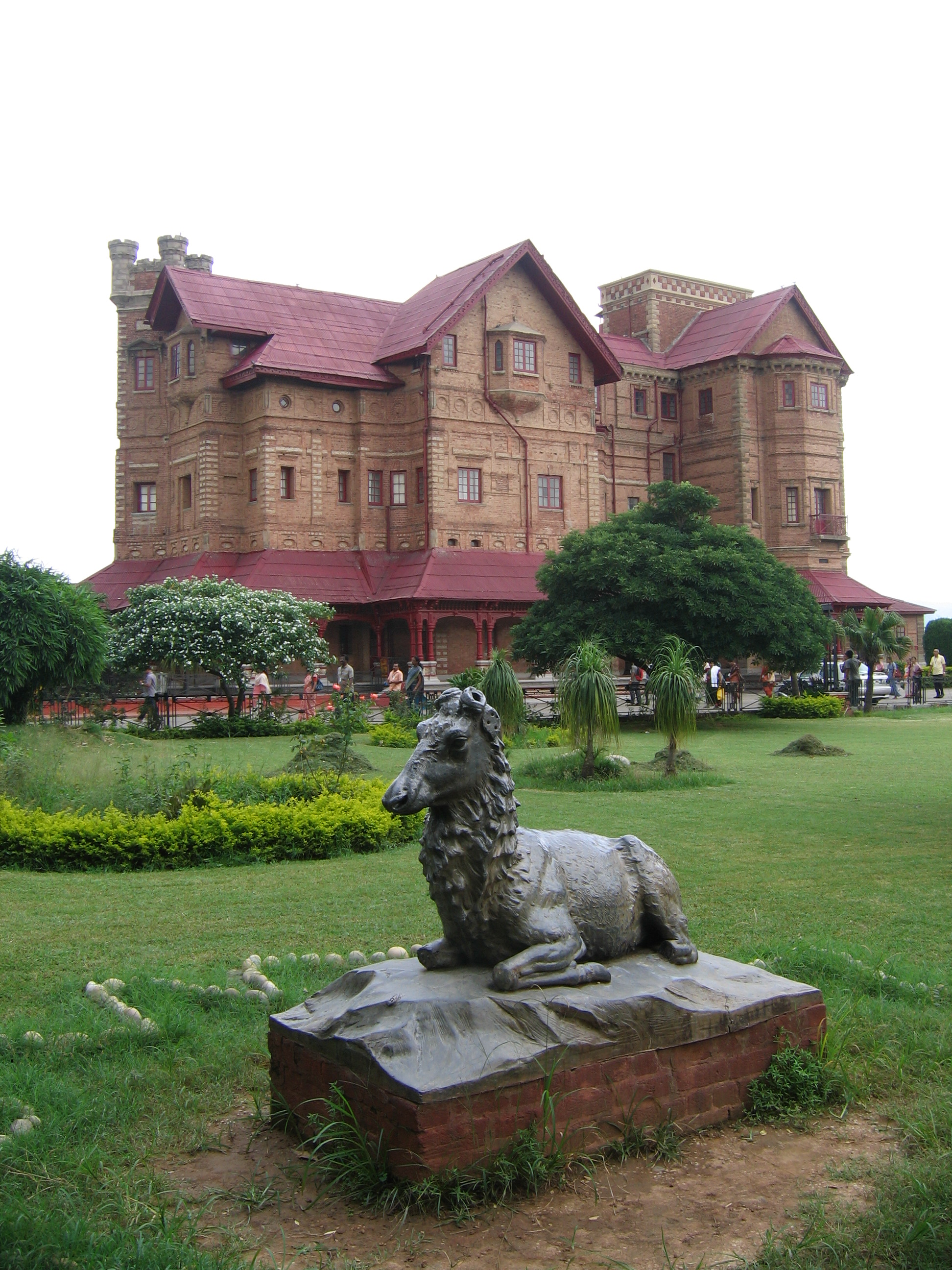
- Amar Mahal Palace
- Currency: Indian Rupee (INR, ₹)
- Fiscal year: 1 April - 31 March

Statistics
- GDP: ▲₹3.16 lakh crore (US$33 billion) (nominal; 2026-27) ▲$157.75 billion(PPP; 2025-26 est.)
- GDP rank: 21st
- GDP growth: ▲9.5% (2026-27 est.)
- GDP per capita: ▲₹206,189 (US$2,100) (2025-26) ▲$11,326 (PPP; 2025-26 est.)
- GDP per capita rank: 21th
- GDP by sector: Agriculture: 20% Industry: 19% Services: 61% (2025–26)
- Human Development Index: ▲0.763 High (2023) (7th)
- All values, unless otherwise stated, are in US dollars.

The economy of Jammu and Kashmir is estimated to have a gross state domestic product (GSDP) of about ₹3.16 lakh crore (US$33 billion) in FY 2026-27 at current prices. Real GSDP is estimated to grow 9.5% over the previous year. In FY 2025-26, the state's service sector contributed to 61% of GSDP, followed by agriculture at 20% and industry at 19%. Tourism, horticulture, and handicrafts are the main sources of private income; tourism contributes about 7% to the economy. The Kashmir Valley leads in apple production, as well as walnuts and cherries. Saffron cultivation is a major livelihood source for 20,000-25,000 families, with an annual production of 13-14 tonnes. The government relies heavily on central grants, estimated at about 65% of revenue receipts in 2026-27.
