= List of State Protected Monuments in Jammu and Kashmir =

This is a list of State Protected Monuments listed by the Archaeological Survey of India (ASI) in the Indian union territory of Jammu and Kashmir.

The monument identifier is a combination of the abbreviation of the subdivision of the list (state, ASI circle) and the numbering as published on the website of the ASI. 28 State Protected Monuments have been recognized by the ASI in Jammu and Kashmir. Besides the State Protected Monuments, there are 56 Monuments of National Importance in this state.

== List of state protected monuments ==
SL. No.	Description	Location	Address	District	Coordinates	Image
S-JK-1	Ancient Temple at Narastha Tral	Kashmir		Kashmir		Upload Photo
S-JK-2	Ruins of Ancient Temple and Spring of Kothier Nowgam. Anantnag	Kashmir		Kashmir		Upload Photo
S-JK-3	Mosque and Tomb of Madin Sahib	Kashmir	Hawal, Zadibal	Srinagar		Mosque and Tomb of Madin Sahib
S-JK-4	'Mamleshwar Temple' at Mamal, Phalgam	Kashmir		Kashmir		'Mamleshwar Temple' at Mamal, Phalgam
S-JK-5	Ruins of Temple at Firozpur, Drung	Kashmir		Kashmir		Upload Photo
S-JK-6	Hari Parbat Fort	Kashmir	Hari Parbat hill	Srinagar		Hari Parbat Fort
S-JK-7	Ancient Buddhist site, situated in compartment No.30 at Hionar (Lidroo) Pahalgam.	Kashmir		Kashmir		Upload Photo
S-JK-8	Ancient Temple at Village Batermulla, Mansbal Sonawari	Kashmir		Kashmir		Ancient Temple at Village Batermulla, Mansbal Sonawari
S-JK-9	Ruins of Mughal Hamam at Achabal, Anantnag.	Kashmir		Kashmir		Ruins of Mughal Hamam at Achabal, Anantnag.
S-JK-10	Chatur - Mukha Linga at Achabal, Anantnag	Kashmir		Anantnag		Upload Photo
S-JK-11	Parhaspora, Pattan, Barmulla	Kashmir		Baramulla		Upload Photo
S-JK-12	Hutmura Pahalgam	Kashmir		Kashmir		Upload Photo
S-JK-13	Ashratnar District, Budgam.	Kashmir		Kashmir		Upload Photo
S-JK-14	Ancient Temple complex at Saki-Maidan, Poonch	Jammu		poonch		Upload Photo
S-JK-15	Shahi Mughal Mashid, Nowshera, Rajouri	Jammu		Rajouri		Upload Photo
S-JK-16	Chairans Devta Salal, Udhampur	Jammu		udhumpur		Upload Photo
S-JK-17	Temple Samadhi Charei, Udhampur	Jammu		udhampur		Upload Photo
S-JK-18	Goda Gali Gool, Udhampur.	Jammu		udhampur		Upload Photo
S-JK-19	Jalandra Devi Temple Ladden kotli, Udhampur	Jammu		udhampur		Upload Photo
S-JK-20	Chingus Sari, Rajouri	Jammu		Rajouri		Upload Photo
S-JK-21	Assar Temple at Assar Doda	Jammu		Doda		Upload Photo
S-JK-22	Bahu Fort, Jammu	Jammu		Jammu		Bahu Fort, Jammu
S-JK-23	Pirmitha Tomb at Pirmitha, Jammu	Jammu		Jammu		Upload Photo
S-JK-24	Mast Garh Shahi Masjid at Jammu	Jammu		Jammu		Mast Garh Shahi Masjid at Jammu
S-JK-25	BhimGarh Fort Reasi, Udhampur	Jammu		Reasi		BhimGarh Fort Reasi, Udhampur
S-JK-26	Salal Fort Satal Sale	Jammu		Jammu		Upload Photo
S-JK-27	Fort complex at Jasrota	Jammu		Jammu		Upload Photo
S-JK-28	Mubarak mandi complex gammes.	Jammu		Jammu		Mubarak mandi complex gammes.

== See also ==
- List of Monuments of National Importance in India, for Monuments of National Importance in India
- List of Monuments of National Importance in Jammu and Kashmir
