= Ikkjutt Jammu =

Indian political party

IkkJutt Jammu
- Founder: Ankur Sharma
- Founded: November 2020
- Dissolved: 23 September 2024
- Merged into: Bharatiya Janata Party
- Ideology: Jammu statehood Panun Kashmir statehood

Website
- www.ekam4sanatan.org

Ikkjutt Jammu, later known as Ekam Sanatan Bharat Dal, was a party in the Jammu region of Jammu and Kashmir, India. It campaigned for the creation of a separate Jammu state out of the Dogri-speaking districts of Jammu Division and for the reorganisation of Kashmir Division into two union territories, one being Panun Kashmir for Kashmiri Hindus who have been displaced from the region. It was founded in November 2020 and was led by Ankur Sharma.

== History ==
IkkJutt Jammu was originally founded as a social organisation based in Jammu. It officially became a political party on 14 November 2020. IkkJutt Jammu campaigned against the Roshni Act, which was declared unconstitutional by the Jammu and Kashmir High Court in 2020. In 2023, Sandeep Deo was nominated as the National General Secretary of the party, a collaborative effort in the space of competitive Hindutva.

Ikkjutt Jammu was renamed Ekam Sanatan Bharat Dal in 2023.

During the 2024 Jammu and Kashmir Legislative Assembly election, the party announced that it would merge into the Bharatiya Janata Party.

== Platform ==
In addition to advocating statehood for the Jammu Division, with the "Alag Jammu Rajya Sthapana Yatra" (Separate Jammu State Foundation Tour) for achieving this mission of separate Jammu State from the town of Katra, considered the abode of the deity Shri Mata Vaishno Devi Ji for Bharat and the wider stance of Sanatana Indic civilization, with Ankur Sharma the party chairman having said:

"Statehood for Jammu is our battle-cry ...and...Jammu’s political redemption (paraphrased)."

— Ankur Sharma

The party also sought the return of Kashmiri Hindu IDPs to the region, the complete administrative integration of Jammu and Kashmir with the rest of India and to promote and restore Dogra heritage and pride in the region. It wanted to stop what it describes as "Islamic separatism" and the "Jihadi war" in the region. were carrying out war against the Indian nation and believed that these forces had "cleansed Kashmir of Hindus" and turned the region into a "Islamic monolith" through a process of "demographic invasion".

The party demanded Kashmir Division be split into two separate Union Territories, one for the almost entirely displaced Kashmiri Hindu community (Panun Kashmir). Ikkjutt Jammu demanded that the Exodus of Kashmiri Hindus be recognised as a genocide and also demands protection of Jammu's Hindu demography.

== See also ==
- List of districts of Jammu and Kashmir
- Politics of Jammu and Kashmir
