= Jammu and Kashmir State Vigilance Commission =

- Logo of JKSVC

Commission overview
- Formed: 15 February 2011; 15 years ago
- Jurisdiction: Government of Jammu and Kashmir
- Headquarters: Old Assembly Complex Srinagar 190001; 34.0826627°N 74.8624092°E
- Commission executives: P.L. Gupta, (Chief Vigilance Commissioner); Hilal Ahmad Parray, (Vigilance Commissioner)
- Parent Commission: Jammu and Kashmir State Vigilance Organisation
- Website: jksvc.gov.in

Jammu and Kashmir State Vigilance Commission (JKSVC) (formally established as Jammu and Kashmir Anti-Corruption Bureau) is a government agency led by the Government of Jammu and Kashmir under the State Vigilance Commission Act, 2011. The commission was set up to inquire into corruption against government officials in the state of Jammu and Kashmir.

== History ==
The Jammu & Kashmir State Vigilance Commission Act, 2011 reveals the formation of JKSVC under the section State Vigilance Commission Act, 2011 which indicates that the JKSVC was constituted on 15 February 2011 under Sub-Section-1 of Section 3, with the mandate to monitor, inquire or investigate the corruption under any Act of the Parliament or the Act of State Legislature of J&K. After the formation of JKSVC, the Commission became functional with effect from February 2013 after appointment of first Chief Vigilance Commission Kuldeep Khoda and Vigilance Commissioners R.K. Jerath and Smt. Gous-ul-Nisa Jeelani.

== Functions ==
- To investigate the offences under the Prevention of Corruption Act, Samvat 2006.
- To give directions to the Jammu and Kashmir Vigilance Organization for the objective of entrusted responsibility discharge to under the Prevention of Corruption Act, Samvat 2006.
- To inquire or cause an inquiry or investigation on a reference made by the Government of Jammu and Kashmir.
- To investigate corruption cases under the Prevention of Corruption Act, Samvat 2006, against a public servant being an employee of the Government or a corporation established in the State by or under, any Central Act or the Act of State Legislature, Government company, society and any local authority owned or controlled by the state Government.
- To inquire or cause an inquiry or investigation to be made into any complaint against any official belonging to state of J&K.
- To review or monitor the progress of investigations conducted by the Vigilance Organization of J&K.
