= Jammu and Kashmir Legislative Council =

Defunct upper house in India

Type
- Type: Upper house

History
- Established: 1957
- Disbanded: 2019
- Seats: 36 (28 Elected + 8 Nominated)

Elections
- Voting system: Proportional representation, First past the post and Nominations

Meeting place
- Jammu (winter), Srinagar (summer)

The Jammu and Kashmir Legislative Council (also known as the Jammu and Kashmir Vidhan Parishad) was the upper house of the legislature of the erstwhile state of Jammu and Kashmir, India.

== History ==
The first Legislature was established by the government of the then-Maharaja of Kashmir, Hari Singh, in 1934. On 17 November 1956, a new constitution was adopted by the constituent assembly and called as the Constitution of Jammu and Kashmir. Articles 46 and 50 of the Constitution of Jammu and Kashmir provided for Jammu and Kashmir Legislative Council, which provisions were made effective from 26 January 1957.

In August 2019, an act was passed the Indian Parliament, which reorganised the erstwhile state of Jammu and Kashmir into two union territories of Jammu and Kashmir and Ladakh on 31 October 2019. The new union territory of Jammu and Kashmir will elect a unicameral legislature from this date onwards. The Legislative Council of Jammu and Kashmir was formally abolished on 31 October 2019 on implementation of the Jammu and Kashmir Reorganisation Act, 2019 as per its Section 57.

== Membership and Tenure ==
The council was governed according to the Indian Constitution and acts of the Indian Parliament. The eligibility criteria for the membership in the Legislative Council waa as follows:

1. Council member must be a citizen of India.
2. Council member must be at least 30 years of age.
3. Council member must meet any additional requirements stipulated in an act of Parliament.
4. Council member cannot hold any office of profit (Note: "Holding an office under the Central or State government, to which some pay, salary, emolument, remuneration or non-compensatory allowance is attached."), other than a ministerial position, in the Union or state government(s), and must resign from any such office upon their election.
5. Council member cannot be a member of any other Indian house of parliament.
6. Council member must be of sound mind and physical health as determined by the court of competent jurisdiction.

== Office-Bearers of the Council ==
The Legislative Council was headed by a Chairman and Deputy Chairman elected by the members of the Council. The Leader of the House was the leader of the party (or coalition) holding the most number of seats in the council. The Leader of the Opposition represented the second-largest party or coalition.
