= List of Indian states and union territories by Human Development Index =

The Human Development Index (HDI) is a statistical composite index of life expectancy, education (mean years of schooling completed and expected years of schooling upon entering the education system), and per capita income indicators, which is used to rank countries into four tiers of human development. A territory scores a higher level of HDI when the lifespan is higher, the education level is higher, and the gross national income GNI (PPP) per capita is higher.

As per United Nations Development Programme, India had a HDI of 0.434 in 1990, which steadily increased and reached 0.490 in 2000, and 0.572 in 2010. As per the latest report, the HDI climbed to 0.685 in 2023 from 0.676 in 2022, which placed India in the medium category and ranked it 130th out of 193 countries.

The various Indian states and union territories have significant variations in HDI. Goa had the highest HDI amongst the Indian states with Bihar ranking last.

== MoSPI ==
The list is based on the 2018 report published by the Ministry of Statistics and Programme Implementation (MoSPI) of Government of India.

| Rank | State/Union Territory | HDI (2018) |
|---|---|---|
High
| 1 | Delhi | 0.839 |
| 2 | Chandigarh | 0.827 |
| 3 | Goa | 0.806 |
| 4 | Kerala | 0.775 |
| 5 | Sikkim | 0.764 |
| 6 | Himachal Pradesh | 0.761 |
| 7 | Uttarakhand | 0.758 |
| 8 | Puducherry | 0.752 |
| 9 | Maharashtra | 0.750 |
| 10 | Mizoram | 0.747 |
| 11 | Punjab | 0.738 |
| 12 | Tamil Nadu | 0.738 |
| 13 | Haryana | 0.724 |
| 14 | Andaman and Nicobar | 0.707 |
| 15 | Karnataka | 0.706 |
| 16 | Telangana | 0.705 |
| 17 | Meghalaya | 0.704 |
Medium
| 18 | Gujarat | 0.698 |
| 19 | Daman and Diu | 0.695 |
| 20 | Lakshadweep | 0.687 |
| 21 | Manipur | 0.686 |
| 22 | Arunachal Pradesh | 0.684 |
| 23 | Nagaland | 0.678 |
| 24 | West Bengal | 0.674 |
| – | India | 0.672 |
| 25 | Tripura | 0.667 |
| 26 | Dadra and Nagar Haveli | 0.662 |
| 27 | Jammu and Kashmir | 0.663 |
| 28 | Assam | 0.651 |
| 29 | Odisha | 0.649 |
| 30 | Andhra Pradesh | 0.648 |
| 31 | Rajasthan | 0.638 |
| 32 | Chhattisgarh | 0.629 |
| 33 | Jharkhand | 0.618 |
| 34 | Madhya Pradesh | 0.608 |
| 35 | Uttar Pradesh | 0.592 |
| 36 | Bihar | 0.551 |

=== Historical trend ===
Legend

High

0.850–0.899
0.800–0.849
0.750–0.799
0.700–0.749

Medium

0.650–0.699
0.600–0.649
0.550–0.599
0.500–0.549

Low

0.450–0.499
0.400–0.449
0.350–0.399
0.300–0.349
0.250–0.299
≤0.250
No information

1981 to 2011 HDI trend

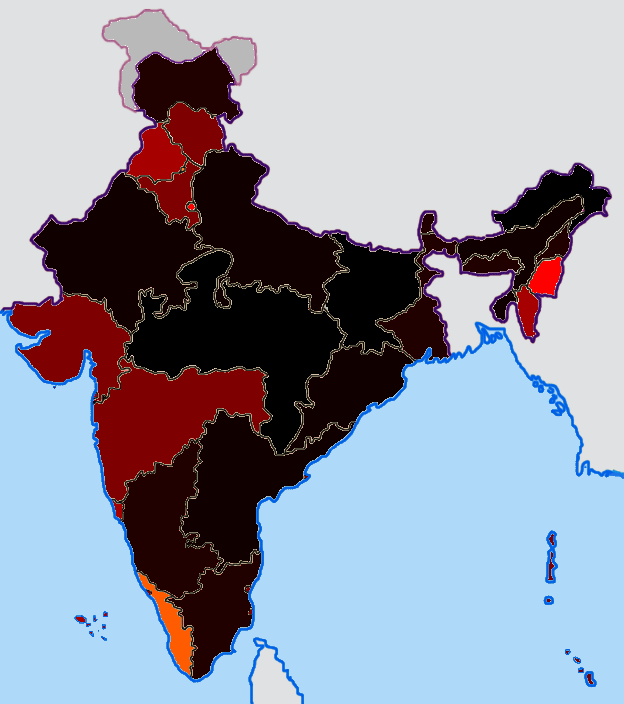
1981

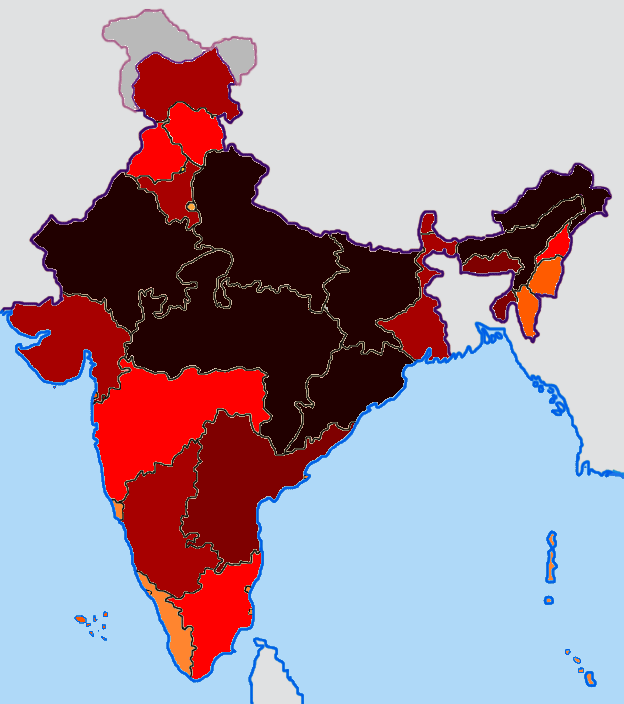
1991

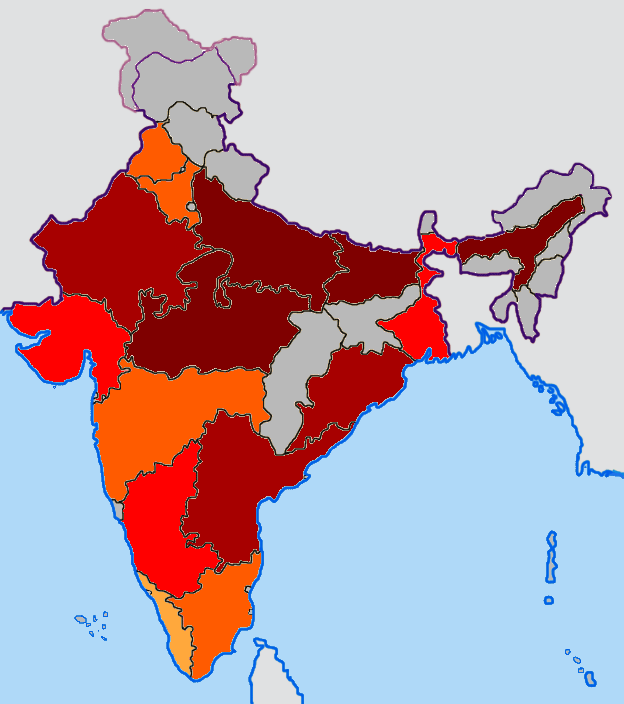
2001

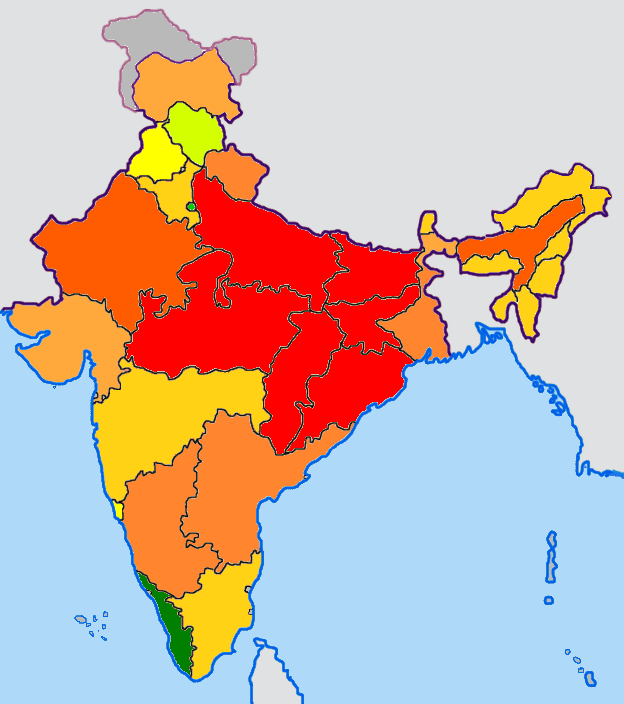
2007–08

== Global Data Labs ==
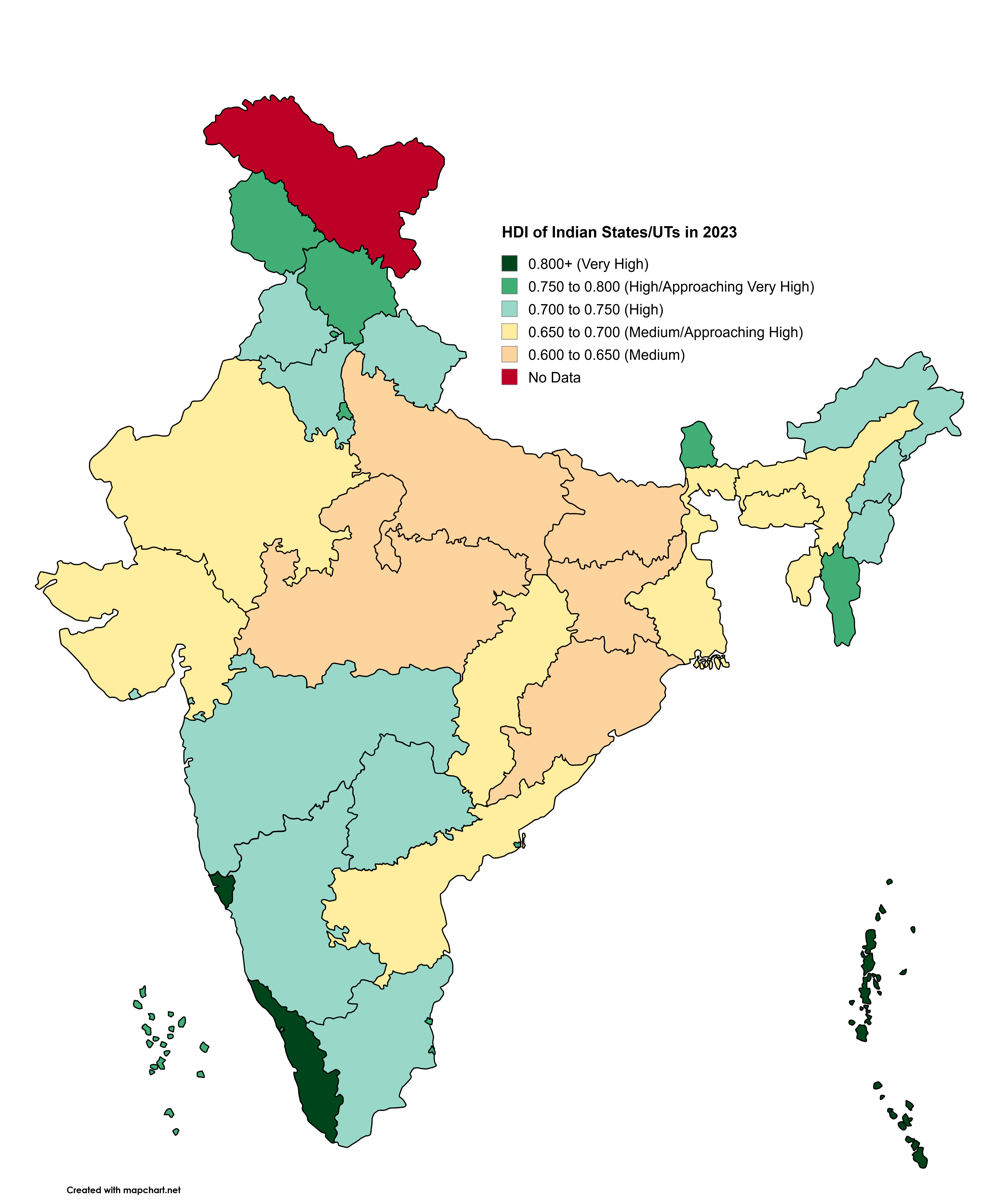
HDI of Indian States and UTs in 2023

| Rank | State/Union Territory | HDI (2023) | Comparable Countries (2023) |
|---|---|---|---|
Very High
| 1 | Goa | 0.806 | Mauritius |
| 2 | Kerala | 0.804 | Bosnia and Herzegovina |
High
| 3 | Chandigarh | 0.796 | China |
| 4 | Puducherry | 0.786 | Brazil |
| 5 | Delhi | 0.779 | Ukraine |
| 6 | Lakshwadeep | 0.763 | Algeria |
| 7 | Jammu and Kashmir | 0.763 | Algeria |
| 8 | Himachal Pradesh | 0.759 | Dominica |
| 9 | Sikkim | 0.755 | Paraguay |
| 10 | Mizoram | 0.753 | Egypt |
| 11 | Andaman and Nicobar | 0.749 | Saint Lucia |
| 12 | Punjab | 0.740 | Uzbekistan |
| 13 | Maharashtra | 0.738 | Uzbekistan |
| 14 | Haryana | 0.738 | Uzbekistan |
| 15 | Tamil Nadu | 0.734 | Bolivia |
| 16 | Manipur | 0.726 | Indonesia |
| 17 | Arunachal Pradesh | 0.724 | Suriname |
| 18 | Uttarakhand | 0.723 | Suriname |
| 19 | Nagaland | 0.721 | Belize |
| 20 | Karnataka | 0.715 | Philippines |
| 21 | Daman and Diu | 0.715 | Philippines |
| 22 | Telangana | 0.700 | Bhutan |
Medium
| 23 | Rajasthan | 0.692 | Tajikistan |
| 24 | Meghalaya | 0.690 | Tajikistan |
| 25 | Gujarat | 0.686 | Bangladesh |
| – | India | 0.685 | Bangladesh |
| 26 | Andhra Pradesh | 0.681 | El Salvador |
| 27 | West Bengal | 0.674 | Palestine |
| 28 | Chhattisgarh | 0.664 | Namibia |
| 29 | Dadra and Nagar Haveli | 0.663 | Guatemala |
| 30 | Tripura | 0.663 | Guatemala |
| 31 | Assam | 0.654 | Republic of Congo |
| 32 | Madhya Pradesh | 0.649 | Republic of Congo |
| 33 | Uttar Pradesh | 0.648 | Republic of Congo |
| 34 | Odisha | 0.648 | Republic of Congo |
| 35 | Jharkhand | 0.638 | São Tomé and Príncipe |
| 36 | Bihar | 0.614 | Micronesia |

=== Historical trend ===
| State | HDI | | | | | | | | | | | | | | | | | | | | | | | | | | | | | | | | |
| State | 1990 | 1991 | 1992 | 1993 | 1994 | 1995 | 1996 | 1997 | 1998 | 1999 | 2000 | 2001 | 2002 | 2003 | 2004 | 2005 | 2006 | 2007 | 2008 | 2009 | 2010 | 2011 | 2012 | 2013 | 2014 | 2015 | 2016 | 2017 | 2018 | 2019 | 2020 | 2021 | 2022 |
|---|---|---|---|---|---|---|---|---|---|---|---|---|---|---|---|---|---|---|---|---|---|---|---|---|---|---|---|---|---|---|---|---|---|
North India
| Chandigarh | 0.636 | 0.639 | 0.646 | 0.640 | 0.635 | 0.632 | 0.631 | 0.628 | 0.626 | 0.627 | 0.628 | 0.629 | 0.632 | 0.643 | 0.649 | 0.655 | 0.661 | 0.656 | 0.650 | 0.642 | 0.639 | 0.641 | 0.638 | 0.666 | 0.697 | 0.725 | 0.755 | 0.756 | 0.749 | 0.745 | 0.745 | 0.738 | 0.751 |
| Delhi | 0.581 | 0.585 | 0.592 | 0.598 | 0.606 | 0.614 | 0.624 | 0.633 | 0.642 | 0.653 | 0.656 | 0.658 | 0.661 | 0.671 | 0.677 | 0.683 | 0.689 | 0.694 | 0.695 | 0.695 | 0.699 | 0.708 | 0.711 | 0.713 | 0.719 | 0.722 | 0.727 | 0.732 | 0.729 | 0.728 | 0.728 | 0.722 | 0.734 |
| Haryana | 0.471 | 0.474 | 0.479 | 0.485 | 0.493 | 0.501 | 0.510 | 0.518 | 0.527 | 0.537 | 0.542 | 0.546 | 0.553 | 0.566 | 0.575 | 0.584 | 0.594 | 0.603 | 0.610 | 0.615 | 0.625 | 0.639 | 0.648 | 0.656 | 0.669 | 0.678 | 0.691 | 0.694 | 0.690 | 0.689 | 0.689 | 0.683 | 0.696 |
| Himachal Pradesh | 0.485 | 0.488 | 0.493 | 0.503 | 0.514 | 0.525 | 0.538 | 0.549 | 0.562 | 0.575 | 0.583 | 0.589 | 0.598 | 0.615 | 0.626 | 0.638 | 0.650 | 0.653 | 0.654 | 0.653 | 0.658 | 0.667 | 0.670 | 0.677 | 0.688 | 0.696 | 0.707 | 0.712 | 0.709 | 0.709 | 0.709 | 0.703 | 0.715 |
| Jammu and Kashmir | 0.499 | 0.502 | 0.507 | 0.506 | 0.506 | 0.507 | 0.509 | 0.510 | 0.511 | 0.514 | 0.522 | 0.530 | 0.539 | 0.556 | 0.568 | 0.581 | 0.593 | 0.605 | 0.614 | 0.621 | 0.633 | 0.648 | 0.658 | 0.659 | 0.665 | 0.667 | 0.672 | 0.690 | 0.700 | 0.712 | 0.712 | 0.706 | 0.720 |
| Punjab | 0.502 | 0.505 | 0.510 | 0.517 | 0.524 | 0.532 | 0.541 | 0.549 | 0.558 | 0.568 | 0.572 | 0.575 | 0.580 | 0.593 | 0.600 | 0.608 | 0.616 | 0.626 | 0.633 | 0.638 | 0.648 | 0.662 | 0.670 | 0.677 | 0.687 | 0.695 | 0.706 | 0.705 | 0.696 | 0.691 | 0.692 | 0.685 | 0.698 |
| Rajasthan | 0.406 | 0.408 | 0.413 | 0.418 | 0.424 | 0.431 | 0.438 | 0.443 | 0.449 | 0.457 | 0.462 | 0.466 | 0.472 | 0.485 | 0.494 | 0.503 | 0.512 | 0.520 | 0.526 | 0.530 | 0.539 | 0.552 | 0.559 | 0.570 | 0.585 | 0.598 | 0.614 | 0.628 | 0.635 | 0.645 | 0.645 | 0.640 | 0.652 |
| Uttar Pradesh | 0.398 | 0.401 | 0.405 | 0.411 | 0.417 | 0.423 | 0.430 | 0.436 | 0.442 | 0.450 | 0.455 | 0.460 | 0.466 | 0.479 | 0.487 | 0.496 | 0.505 | 0.512 | 0.516 | 0.519 | 0.526 | 0.536 | 0.541 | 0.548 | 0.560 | 0.568 | 0.579 | 0.591 | 0.596 | 0.604 | 0.603 | 0.598 | 0.609 |
| Uttarakhand | 0.627 | 0.630 | 0.636 | 0.634 | 0.629 | 0.626 | 0.624 | 0.621 | 0.619 | 0.619 | 0.620 | 0.620 | 0.623 | 0.665 | 0.641 | 0.647 | 0.653 | 0.648 | 0.641 | 0.633 | 0.631 | 0.632 | 0.629 | 0.636 | 0.647 | 0.655 | 0.666 | 0.673 | 0.672 | 0.675 | 0.675 | 0.669 | 0.681 |
West India
| Dadra and Nagar Haveli | 0.672 | 0.676 | 0.682 | 0.680 | 0.676 | 0.673 | 0.672 | 0.620 | 0.669 | 0.670 | 0.672 | 0.673 | 0.676 | 0.687 | 0.693 | 0.699 | 0.706 | 0.701 | 0.695 | 0.687 | 0.685 | 0.687 | 0.684 | 0.673 | 0.665 | 0.655 | 0.655 | 0.647 | 0.640 | 0.628 | 0.618 | 0.613 | 0.624 |
| Daman and Diu | 0.651 | 0.656 | 0.663 | 0.658 | 0.654 | 0.652 | 0.652 | 0.651 | 0.650 | 0.651 | 0.654 | 0.654 | 0.657 | 0.668 | 0.673 | 0.679 | 0.685 | 0.681 | 0.675 | 0.668 | 0.666 | 0.669 | 0.666 | 0.669 | 0.677 | 0.682 | 0.690 | 0.686 | 0.676 | 0.668 | 0.668 | 0.662 | 0.674 |
| Goa | 0.558 | 0.561 | 0.567 | 0.570 | 0.573 | 0.577 | 0.583 | 0.587 | 0.592 | 0.599 | 0.608 | 0.615 | 0.624 | 0.641 | 0.653 | 0.665 | 0.678 | 0.692 | 0.704 | 0.713 | 0.728 | 0.747 | 0.759 | 0.753 | 0.751 | 0.746 | 0.743 | 0.751 | 0.751 | 0.753 | 0.754 | 0.747 | 0.760 |
| Gujarat | 0.474 | 0.477 | 0.483 | 0.485 | 0.488 | 0.492 | 0.498 | 0.502 | 0.507 | 0.514 | 0.520 | 0.526 | 0.533 | 0.547 | 0.556 | 0.566 | 0.577 | 0.583 | 0.587 | 0.589 | 0.597 | 0.608 | 0.614 | 0.622 | 0.634 | 0.643 | 0.656 | 0.654 | 0.645 | 0.640 | 0.640 | 0.635 | 0.646 |
| Maharashtra | 0.498 | 0.501 | 0.507 | 0.511 | 0.515 | 0.521 | 0.527 | 0.532 | 0.538 | 0.545 | 0.551 | 0.556 | 0.563 | 0.577 | 0.586 | 0.596 | 0.606 | 0.615 | 0.621 | 0.626 | 0.636 | 0.649 | 0.657 | 0.660 | 0.668 | 0.672 | 0.680 | 0.687 | 0.686 | 0.689 | 0.689 | 0.683 | 0.695 |
East India
| Andaman and Nicobar Islands | 0.686 | 0.690 | 0.697 | 0.691 | 0.688 | 0.685 | 0.684 | 0.682 | 0.681 | 0.682 | 0.684 | 0.685 | 0.688 | 0.699 | 0.705 | 0.712 | 0.718 | 0.713 | 0.707 | 0.699 | 0.697 | 0.700 | 0.696 | 0.700 | 0.708 | 0.714 | 0.723 | 0.718 | 0.707 | 0.699 | 0.699 | 0.693 | 0.706 |
| West Bengal | 0.443 | 0.446 | 0.452 | 0.456 | 0.462 | 0.468 | 0.475 | 0.481 | 0.487 | 0.495 | 0.499 | 0.502 | 0.506 | 0.518 | 0.525 | 0.532 | 0.540 | 0.547 | 0.552 | 0.556 | 0.564 | 0.575 | 0.582 | 0.590 | 0.603 | 0.613 | 0.625 | 0.630 | 0.627 | 0.628 | 0.628 | 0.623 | 0.635 |
| Bihar | 0.380 | 0.382 | 0.387 | 0.391 | 0.396 | 0.402 | 0.408 | 0.413 | 0.418 | 0.425 | 0.429 | 0.432 | 0.437 | 0.448 | 0.455 | 0.463 | 0.470 | 0.481 | 0.489 | 0.495 | 0.506 | 0.519 | 0.527 | 0.533 | 0.543 | 0.551 | 0.561 | 0.567 | 0.567 | 0.571 | 0.570 | 0.566 | 0.577 |
| Jharkhand | 0.563 | 0.566 | 0.572 | 0.566 | 0.562 | 0.559 | 0.557 | 0.554 | 0.553 | 0.553 | 0.554 | 0.557 | 0.557 | 0.568 | 0.573 | 0.579 | 0.585 | 0.580 | 0.574 | 0.566 | 0.564 | 0.566 | 0.562 | 0.565 | 0.572 | 0.577 | 0.584 | 0.590 | 0.590 | 0.593 | 0.593 | 0.588 | 0.600 |
| Odisha | 0.403 | 0.405 | 0.409 | 0.413 | 0.418 | 0.423 | 0.430 | 0.434 | 0.440 | 0.447 | 0.451 | 0.455 | 0.460 | 0.472 | 0.479 | 0.487 | 0.495 | 0.504 | 0.511 | 0.517 | 0.527 | 0.540 | 0.548 | 0.556 | 0.568 | 0.578 | 0.590 | 0.598 | 0.603 | 0.603 | 0.614 | 0.598 | 0.610 |
Northeast India
| Assam | 0.413 | 0.415 | 0.420 | 0.426 | 0.434 | 0.442 | 0.450 | 0.458 | 0.466 | 0.476 | 0.481 | 0.486 | 0.493 | 0.506 | 0.515 | 0.524 | 0.533 | 0.540 | 0.545 | 0.549 | 0.557 | 0.569 | 0.576 | 0.579 | 0.586 | 0.590 | 0.598 | 0.605 | 0.605 | 0.609 | 0.608 | 0.603 | 0.615 |
| Arunachal Pradesh | 0.442 | 0.445 | 0.449 | 0.455 | 0.461 | 0.467 | 0.474 | 0.479 | 0.485 | 0.493 | 0.496 | 0.499 | 0.503 | 0.514 | 0.521 | 0.528 | 0.535 | 0.562 | 0.586 | 0.606 | 0.632 | 0.660 | 0.682 | 0.672 | 0.666 | 0.655 | 0.645 | 0.659 | 0.666 | 0.675 | 0.675 | 0.670 | 0.683 |
| Manipur | 0.500 | 0.503 | 0.509 | 0.512 | 0.517 | 0.522 | 0.528 | 0.533 | 0.540 | 0.547 | 0.552 | 0.556 | 0.562 | 0.574 | 0.582 | 0.591 | 0.600 | 0.619 | 0.636 | 0.652 | 0.672 | 0.696 | 0.714 | 0.703 | 0.695 | 0.686 | 0.682 | 0.678 | 0.676 | 0.676 | 0.676 | 0.671 | 0.683 |
| Meghalaya | 0.461 | 0.464 | 0.469 | 0.467 | 0.465 | 0.465 | 0.464 | 0.462 | 0.461 | 0.461 | 0.470 | 0.477 | 0.487 | 0.502 | 0.514 | 0.526 | 0.538 | 0.558 | 0.575 | 0.591 | 0.611 | 0.634 | 0.652 | 0.646 | 0.645 | 0.641 | 0.640 | 0.645 | 0.642 | 0.643 | 0.643 | 0.637 | 0.650 |
| Mizoram | 0.532 | 0.535 | 0.541 | 0.541 | 0.542 | 0.543 | 0.546 | 0.547 | 0.550 | 0.553 | 0.563 | 0.571 | 0.581 | 0.598 | 0.611 | 0.624 | 0.637 | 0.648 | 0.657 | 0.664 | 0.676 | 0.693 | 0.703 | 0.697 | 0.694 | 0.689 | 0.687 | 0.696 | 0.698 | 0.703 | 0.703 | 0.697 | 0.709 |
| Nagaland | 0.539 | 0.542 | 0.548 | 0.541 | 0.535 | 0.530 | 0.526 | 0.521 | 0.516 | 0.513 | 0.516 | 0.519 | 0.524 | 0.536 | 0.543 | 0.550 | 0.558 | 0.583 | 0.605 | 0.626 | 0.651 | 0.680 | 0.703 | 0.690 | 0.682 | 0.671 | 0.662 | 0.669 | 0.669 | 0.682 | 0.672 | 0.667 | 0.679 |
| Sikkim | 0.546 | 0.549 | 0.555 | 0.549 | 0.545 | 0.542 | 0.541 | 0.538 | 0.536 | 0.536 | 0.542 | 0.546 | 0.553 | 0.567 | 0.576 | 0.585 | 0.594 | 0.603 | 0.610 | 0.615 | 0.625 | 0.638 | 0.645 | 0.656 | 0.672 | 0.684 | 0.700 | 0.706 | 0.704 | 0.705 | 0.705 | 0.699 | 0.712 |
| Tripura | 0.450 | 0.452 | 0.458 | 0.465 | 0.474 | 0.483 | 0.493 | 0.501 | 0.511 | 0.521 | 0.524 | 0.526 | 0.530 | 0.541 | 0.548 | 0.555 | 0.561 | 0.581 | 0.581 | 0.588 | 0.599 | 0.615 | 0.625 | 0.627 | 0.633 | 0.636 | 0.642 | 0.637 | 0.626 | 0.617 | 0.617 | 0.612 | 0.624 |
South India
| Andhra Pradesh | 0.428 | 0.430 | 0.435 | 0.438 | 0.441 | 0.446 | 0.450 | 0.454 | 0.459 | 0.464 | 0.472 | 0.478 | 0.487 | 0.502 | 0.513 | 0.524 | 0.535 | 0.546 | 0.554 | 0.560 | 0.571 | 0.586 | 0.595 | 0.602 | 0.614 | 0.623 | 0.635 | 0.638 | 0.635 | 0.635 | 0.635 | 0.630 | 0.642 |
| Karnataka | 0.448 | 0.450 | 0.455 | 0.461 | 0.467 | 0.474 | 0.482 | 0.488 | 0.495 | 0.504 | 0.511 | 0.516 | 0.524 | 0.538 | 0.549 | 0.559 | 0.570 | 0.577 | 0.583 | 0.587 | 0.597 | 0.609 | 0.617 | 0.627 | 0.641 | 0.652 | 0.667 | 0.670 | 0.667 | 0.667 | 0.667 | 0.661 | 0.673 |
| Kerala | 0.551 | 0.554 | 0.560 | 0.561 | 0.563 | 0.565 | 0.569 | 0.571 | 0.574 | 0.579 | 0.592 | 0.604 | 0.618 | 0.639 | 0.656 | 0.672 | 0.689 | 0.695 | 0.698 | 0.699 | 0.706 | 0.718 | 0.723 | 0.730 | 0.741 | 0.750 | 0.761 | 0.762 | 0.755 | 0.751 | 0.751 | 0.745 | 0.758 |
| Lakshadweep | 0.695 | 0.699 | 0.706 | 0.700 | 0.697 | 0.694 | 0.693 | 0.691 | 0.690 | 0.691 | 0.694 | 0.695 | 0.698 | 0.709 | 0.715 | 0.721 | 0.728 | 0.723 | 0.717 | 0.709 | 0.707 | 0.710 | 0.706 | 0.710 | 0.718 | 0.723 | 0.732 | 0.729 | 0.719 | 0.712 | 0.713 | 0.706 | 0.719 |
| Puducherry | 0.711 | 0.716 | 0.726 | 0.725 | 0.722 | 0.719 | 0.718 | 0.716 | 0.715 | 0.717 | 0.719 | 0.720 | 0.723 | 0.735 | 0.741 | 0.748 | 0.754 | 0.749 | 0.743 | 0.735 | 0.732 | 0.735 | 0.732 | 0.727 | 0.726 | 0.722 | 0.721 | 0.729 | 0.731 | 0.735 | 0.735 | 0.729 | 0.741 |
| Tamil Nadu | 0.476 | 0.478 | 0.484 | 0.488 | 0.494 | 0.500 | 0.507 | 0.513 | 0.519 | 0.528 | 0.536 | 0.543 | 0.552 | 0.569 | 0.581 | 0.593 | 0.606 | 0.615 | 0.622 | 0.628 | 0.638 | 0.653 | 0.662 | 0.667 | 0.676 | 0.682 | 0.691 | 0.693 | 0.687 | 0.685 | 0.685 | 0.679 | 0.692 |
| Telangana | 0.624 | 0.628 | 0.634 | 0.628 | 0.624 | 0.621 | 0.619 | 0.617 | 0.615 | 0.615 | 0.617 | 0.618 | 0.621 | 0.632 | 0.637 | 0.643 | 0.649 | 0.644 | 0.638 | 0.630 | 0.628 | 0.620 | 0.627 | 0.630 | 0.638 | 0.644 | 0.653 | 0.657 | 0.653 | 0.653 | 0.653 | 0.647 | 0.660 |
Central India
| Chhattisgarh | 0.563 | 0.566 | 0.571 | 0.566 | 0.562 | 0.559 | 0.557 | 0.554 | 0.552 | 0.552 | 0.553 | 0.554 | 0.557 | 0.567 | 0.573 | 0.578 | 0.584 | 0.580 | 0.573 | 0.566 | 0.563 | 0.565 | 0.562 | 0.568 | 0.578 | 0.586 | 0.597 | 0.607 | 0.611 | 0.618 | 0.618 | 0.613 | 0.625 |
| Madhya Pradesh | 0.408 | 0.410 | 0.415 | 0.418 | 0.422 | 0.427 | 0.432 | 0.436 | 0.440 | 0.446 | 0.452 | 0.456 | 0.463 | 0.475 | 0.484 | 0.493 | 0.503 | 0.510 | 0.516 | 0.520 | 0.528 | 0.540 | 0.547 | 0.555 | 0.567 | 0.577 | 0.589 | 0.598 | 0.600 | 0.605 | 0.605 | 0.599 | 0.611 |
| India | 0.434 | 0.437 | 0.442 | 0.446 | 0.452 | 0.458 | 0.465 | 0.471 | 0.477 | 0.485 | 0.490 | 0.495 | 0.501 | 0.514 | 0.528 | 0.532 | 0.541 | 0.550 | 0.557 | 0.562 | 0.572 | 0.586 | 0.594 | 0.600 | 0.611 | 0.619 | 0.630 | 0.636 | 0.636 | 0.638 | 0.638 | 0.633 | 0.644 |

== Consumption-based ==
The data in the below table is based on the estimated consumption expenditure.

| Rank | State/Union Territory | HDI (2007-08) |
|---|---|---|
| 1 | Kerala | 0.810 |
| 2 | Delhi | 0.750 |
| 3 | Himachal Pradesh | 0.652 |
| 4 | Goa | 0.617 |
| 5 | Punjab | 0.605 |
| 6 | Northeast India | 0.573 |
| 7 | Maharashtra | 0.572 |
| 8 | Tamil Nadu | 0.570 |
| 9 | Haryana | 0.552 |
| 10 | Jammu and Kashmir | 0.542 |
| 11 | Gujarat | 0.527 |
| 12 | Karnataka | 0.519 |
| – | India | 0.513 |
| 13 | West Bengal | 0.492 |
| 14 | Uttarakhand | 0.490 |
| 15 | Andhra Pradesh | 0.473 |
| 17 | Rajasthan | 0.434 |
| 18 | Uttar Pradesh | 0.380 |
| 19 | Jharkhand | 0.376 |
| 20 | Madhya Pradesh | 0.375 |
| 21 | Bihar | 0.367 |
| 22 | Odisha | 0.362 |
| 23 | Chhattisgarh | 0.358 |

== HDI indicators ==
Demographics (2025)
| State or territory | Subnational HDI | Health index | Educational index | Income index | Life expectancy | | | Expected years schooling | | | Mean years schooling | | | Log Gross National Income per capita | | |
| State or territory | Subnational HDI | Health index | Educational index | Income index | Total | Female | Male | Total | Female | Male | Total | Female | Male | Total | Female | Male |
|---|---|---|---|---|---|---|---|---|---|---|---|---|---|---|---|---|
| India | 0.680 | 0.735 | 0.635 | 0.641 | 67.74 | 69.38 | 66.26 | 12.58 | 12.61 | 12.56 | 6.571 | 5.529 | 7.626 | 8.847 | 7.992 | 9.278 |
| Andaman and Nicobar | 0.739 | 0.789 | 0.624 | 0.714 | 71.26 | 73.62 | 69.57 | 13.12 | 13.49 | 12.74 | 7.800 | 7.451 | 8.136 | 9.344 | 8.433 | 9.789 |
| Andhra Pradesh | 0.673 | 0.741 | 0.534 | 0.668 | 68.19 | 69.93 | 66.88 | 12.66 | 12.71 | 12.63 | 5.476 | 4.542 | 6.457 | 9.027 | 8.155 | 9.467 |
| Arunachal Pradesh | 0.716 | 0.795 | 0.595 | 0.674 | 71.65 | 74.08 | 69.93 | 13.99 | 14.06 | 13.94 | 6.178 | 5.411 | 6.916 | 9.064 | 8.189 | 9.506 |
| Assam | 0.645 | 0.745 | 0.546 | 0.571 | 68.42 | 70.20 | 66.90 | 12.03 | 12.35 | 11.74 | 6.364 | 5.852 | 6.856 | 8.387 | 7.577 | 8.796 |
| Bihar | 0.607 | 0.702 | 0.497 | 0.551 | 65.65 | 66.83 | 64.24 | 12.16 | 12.00 | 12.47 | 4.783 | 3.339 | 6.357 | 8.253 | 7.456 | 8.655 |
| Chandigarh | 0.786 | 0.773 | 0.721 | 0.759 | 70.27 | 72.44 | 68.65 | 13.72 | 13.92 | 13.58 | 10.19 | 9.867 | 10.50 | 9.633 | 8.703 | 10.10 |
| Chhattisgarh | 0.656 | 0.725 | 0.546 | 0.617 | 67.13 | 68.64 | 65.67 | 12.56 | 12.99 | 12.14 | 5.899 | 4.681 | 7.096 | 8.688 | 7.879 | 9.111 |
| Dadra and Nagar Haveli | 0.655 | 0.751 | 0.521 | 0.621 | 68.80 | 70.66 | 67.26 | 11.01 | 11.55 | 10.61 | 6.467 | 4.971 | 7.626 | 8.718 | 7.876 | 9.143 |
| Daman and Diu | 0.706 | 0.788 | 0.568 | 0.683 | 71.24 | 73.60 | 69.56 | 11.23 | 11.67 | 10.85 | 7.686 | 6.668 | 8.545 | 9.125 | 8.244 | 9.570 |
| Delhi | 0.792 | 0.760 | 0.790 | 0.742 | 69.40 | 71.39 | 67.83 | 14.10 | 14.61 | 13.61 | 9.308 | 8.589 | 9.955 | 9.518 | 8.598 | 9.981 |
| Goa | 0.795 | 0.808 | 0.714 | 0.761 | 72.51 | 75.11 | 70.73 | 14.28 | 14.44 | 14.14 | 9.525 | 9.223 | 9.915 | 9.643 | 8.712 | 10.11 |
| Gujarat | 0.677 | 0.745 | 0.534 | 0.678 | 68.44 | 70.23 | 66.92 | 11.26 | 10.95 | 11.46 | 6.643 | 5.519 | 7.726 | 9.092 | 8.214 | 9.535 |
| Haryana | 0.729 | 0.739 | 0.631 | 0.721 | 68.03 | 69.73 | 66.53 | 13.67 | 13.85 | 13.46 | 7.542 | 6.302 | 8.715 | 9.381 | 8.475 | 9.838 |
| Himachal Pradesh | 0.749 | 0.765 | 0.667 | 0.717 | 69.73 | 71.78 | 68.14 | 14.07 | 14.61 | 13.52 | 8.296 | 7.494 | 9.195 | 9.355 | 8.451 | 9.811 |
| Jammu and Kashmir | 0.754 | 0.796 | 0.664 | 0.705 | 71.75 | 74.20 | 70.03 | 15.09 | 15.23 | 14.93 | 7.356 | 6.109 | 8.475 | 9.270 | 8.374 | 9.721 |
| Jharkhand | 0.630 | 0.721 | 0.529 | 0.565 | 66.84 | 68.28 | 65.39 | 12.48 | 12.57 | 12.43 | 5.486 | 4.080 | 6.946 | 8.346 | 7.540 | 8.752 |
| Karnataka | 0.706 | 0.767 | 0.585 | 0.681 | 69.88 | 71.96 | 68.28 | 12.88 | 13.03 | 12.73 | 6.808 | 5.905 | 7.736 | 9.112 | 8.232 | 9.556 |
| Kerala | 0.816 | 0.822 | 0.732 | 0.724 | 73.43 | 76.20 | 71.58 | 15.05 | 15.59 | 14.52 | 9.422 | 9.620 | 9.305 | 9.400 | 8.493 | 9.858 |
| Lakshadweep | 0.753 | 0.767 | 0.666 | 0.726 | 69.88 | 72.15 | 68.17 | 13.59 | 14.09 | 13.17 | 8.668 | 8.321 | 9.205 | 9.413 | 8.504 | 9.871 |
| Madhya Pradesh | 0.641 | 0.715 | 0.525 | 0.608 | 66.46 | 67.83 | 65.03 | 11.98 | 11.86 | 12.07 | 5.765 | 4.477 | 6.966 | 8.629 | 7.796 | 9.050 |
| Maharashtra | 0.721 | 0.771 | 0.637 | 0.684 | 70.12 | 72.26 | 68.51 | 13.51 | 13.41 | 13.54 | 7.862 | 6.893 | 8.815 | 9.132 | 8.250 | 9.577 |
| Manipur | 0.716 | 0.769 | 0.674 | 0.614 | 69.96 | 72.06 | 68.36 | 13.94 | 13.92 | 13.96 | 8.616 | 7.870 | 9.445 | 8.671 | 7.834 | 9.094 |
| Meghalaya | 0.682 | 0.744 | 0.590 | 0.624 | 68.34 | 70.10 | 66.82 | 13.42 | 14.13 | 12.74 | 6.529 | 6.571 | 6.536 | 8.737 | 7.893 | 9.162 |
| Mizoram | 0.743 | 0.766 | 0.653 | 0.713 | 69.82 | 71.89 | 68.23 | 13.39 | 13.42 | 13.30 | 8.441 | 8.267 | 8.655 | 9.327 | 8.426 | 9.781 |
| Nagaland | 0.712 | 0.765 | 0.632 | 0.647 | 69.75 | 71.81 | 68.16 | 13.45 | 13.87 | 13.05 | 7.738 | 7.387 | 8.086 | 8.888 | 8.030 | 9.321 |
| Odisha | 0.640 | 0.731 | 0.520 | 0.595 | 67.54 | 69.14 | 66.06 | 11.73 | 11.71 | 11.79 | 5.837 | 4.896 | 6.816 | 8.544 | 7.719 | 8.960 |
| Puducherry | 0.776 | 0.815 | 0.682 | 0.733 | 73.00 | 75.69 | 71.18 | 13.77 | 14.45 | 13.11 | 8.988 | 8.332 | 9.825 | 9.456 | 8.542 | 9.916 |
| Punjab | 0.731 | 0.748 | 0.616 | 0.738 | 68.60 | 70.42 | 67.07 | 13.07 | 13.66 | 12.53 | 7.573 | 7.215 | 7.936 | 9.489 | 8.573 | 9.952 |
| Rajasthan | 0.684 | 0.740 | 0.561 | 0.668 | 68.10 | 69.82 | 66.60 | 13.38 | 13.18 | 13.59 | 5.693 | 3.951 | 7.396 | 9.027 | 8.196 | 9.467 |
| Sikkim | 0.746 | 0.786 | 0.664 | 0.692 | 71.10 | 73.42 | 69.42 | 14.72 | 15.17 | 14.24 | 7.655 | 7.387 | 7.916 | 9.183 | 8.297 | 9.631 |
| Tamil Nadu | 0.735 | 0.779 | 0.626 | 0.679 | 70.89 | 72.76 | 68.90 | 13.43 | 13.87 | 13.00 | 7.593 | 7.000 | 8.286 | 9.102 | 8.233 | 9.545 |
| Telangana | 0.702 | 0.759 | 0.560 | 0.676 | 69.31 | 71.28 | 67.74 | 13.22 | 13.35 | 13.08 | 5.796 | 4.606 | 7.066 | 9.077 | 8.201 | 9.519 |
| Tripura | 0.655 | 0.722 | 0.566 | 0.594 | 66.94 | 68.41 | 65.49 | 12.54 | 12.34 | 12.84 | 6.519 | 5.927 | 7.116 | 8.538 | 7.713 | 8.954 |
| Uttar Pradesh | 0.640 | 0.699 | 0.540 | 0.599 | 65.46 | 66.60 | 64.05 | 11.89 | 11.73 | 12.06 | 6.302 | 4.896 | 7.716 | 8.571 | 7.743 | 8.989 |
| Uttarakhand | 0.714 | 0.734 | 0.627 | 0.686 | 67.72 | 69.36 | 66.24 | 13.24 | 13.56 | 12.94 | 7.769 | 6.614 | 8.965 | 9.148 | 8.265 | 9.594 |
| West Bengal | 0.666 | 0.765 | 0.551 | 0.606 | 69.70 | 71.75 | 68.12 | 12.47 | 12.95 | 12.02 | 6.147 | 5.465 | 6.836 | 8.619 | 7.787 | 9.039 |
