= Jammu and Kashmir Legislature =

The legislative branch of Kashmir in Jammu and Kashmir consists of the unicameral Jammu and Kashmir Legislative Assembly and Lieutenant Governor of Jammu and Kashmir.

Prior to the abolition of the state of Jammu and Kashmir on 2019, the legislative branch consisted of two bodies, namely the Jammu and Kashmir Legislative Assembly and the Jammu and Kashmir Legislative Council, alongside the Governor of Jammu and Kashmir.
