= Jammu and Kashmir (union territory) =

Region administered by India

- Region administered by India as a Union territory
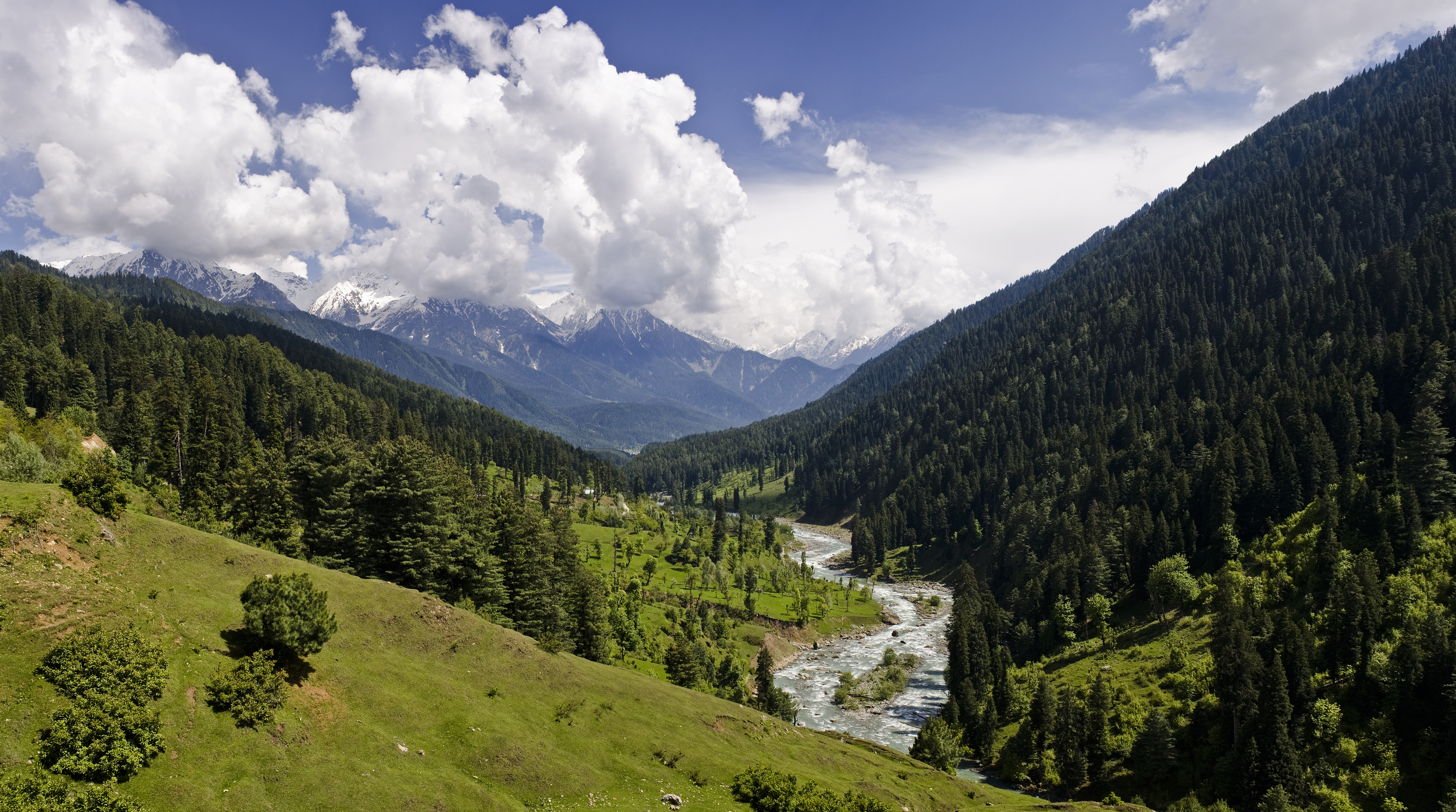
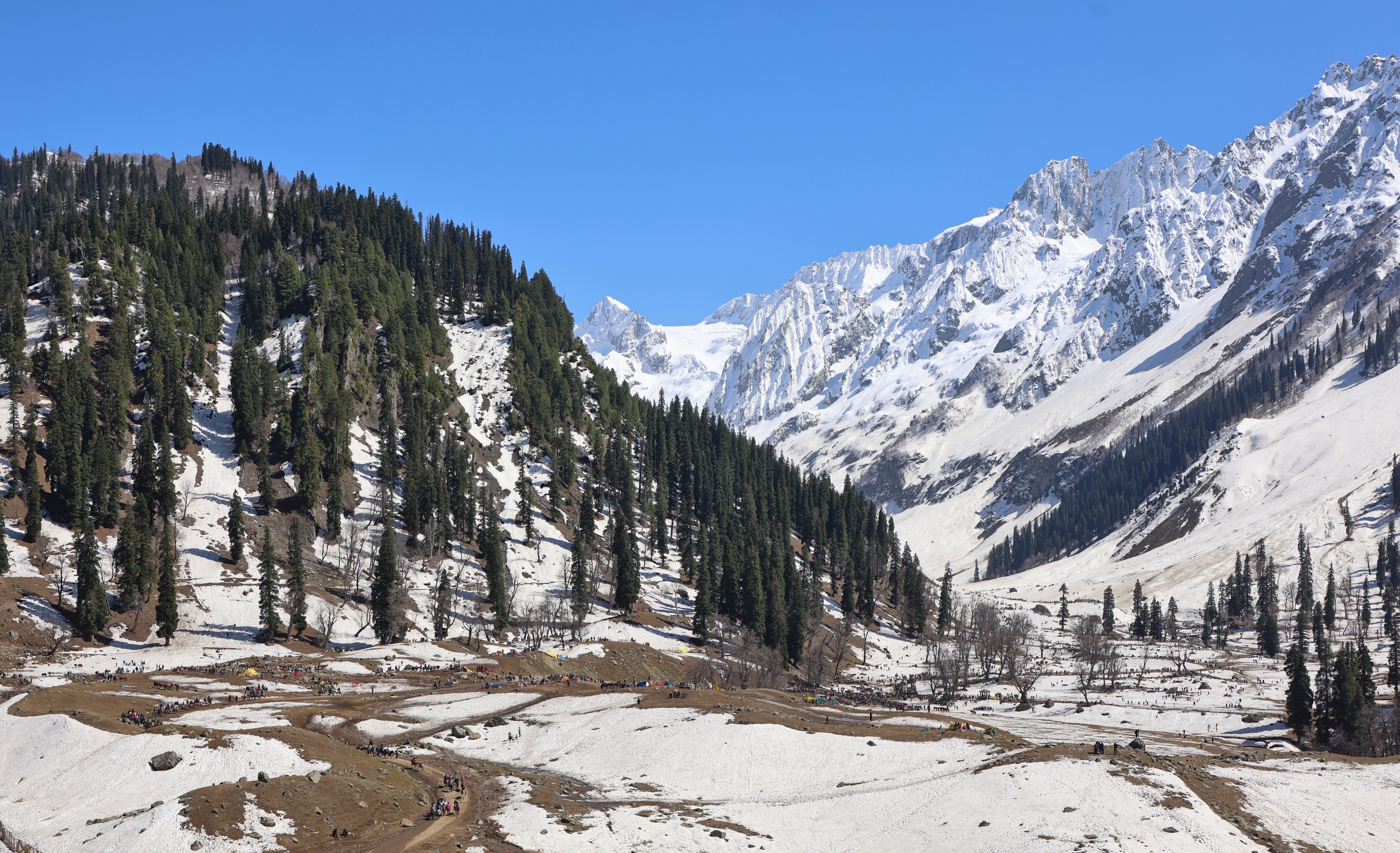
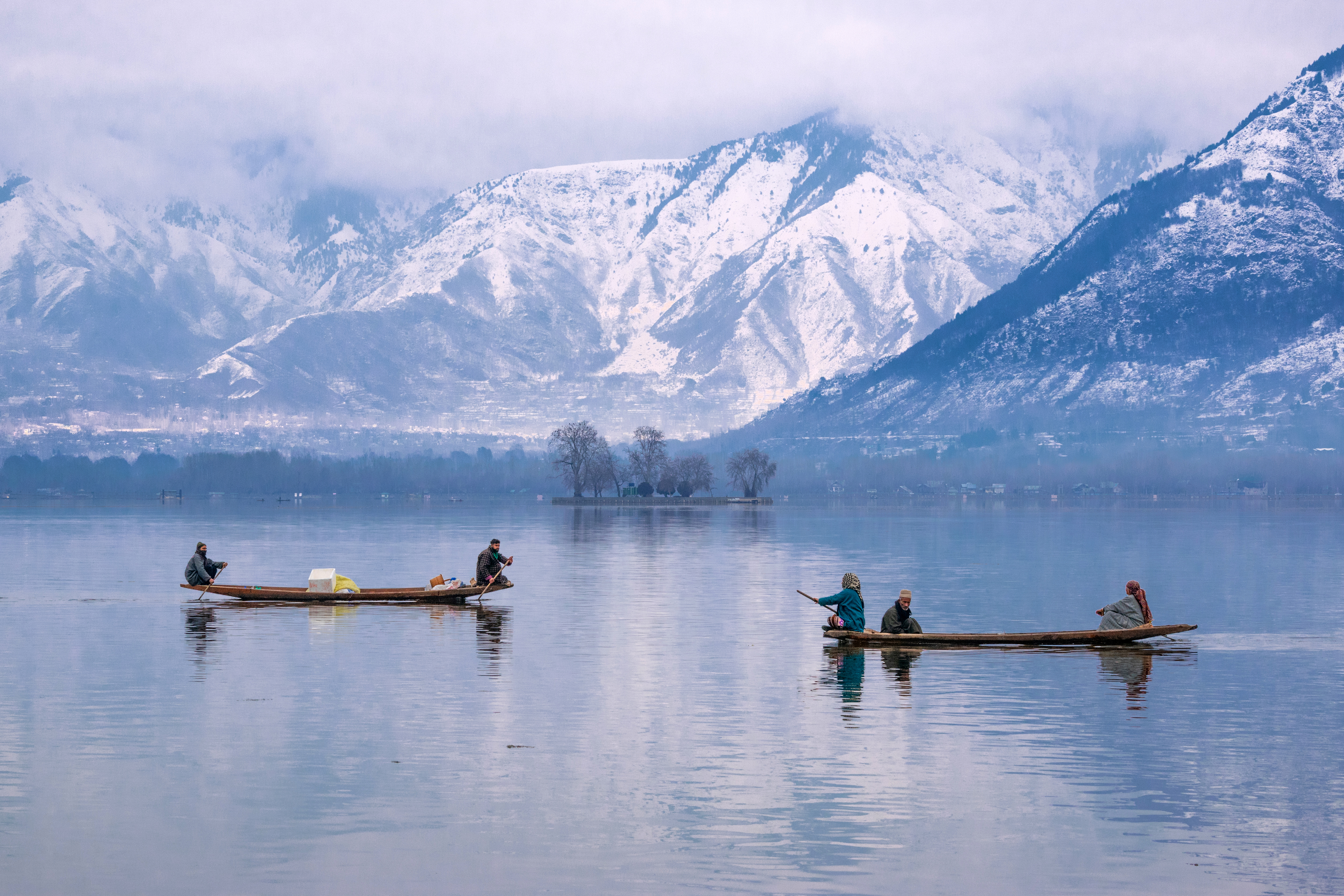
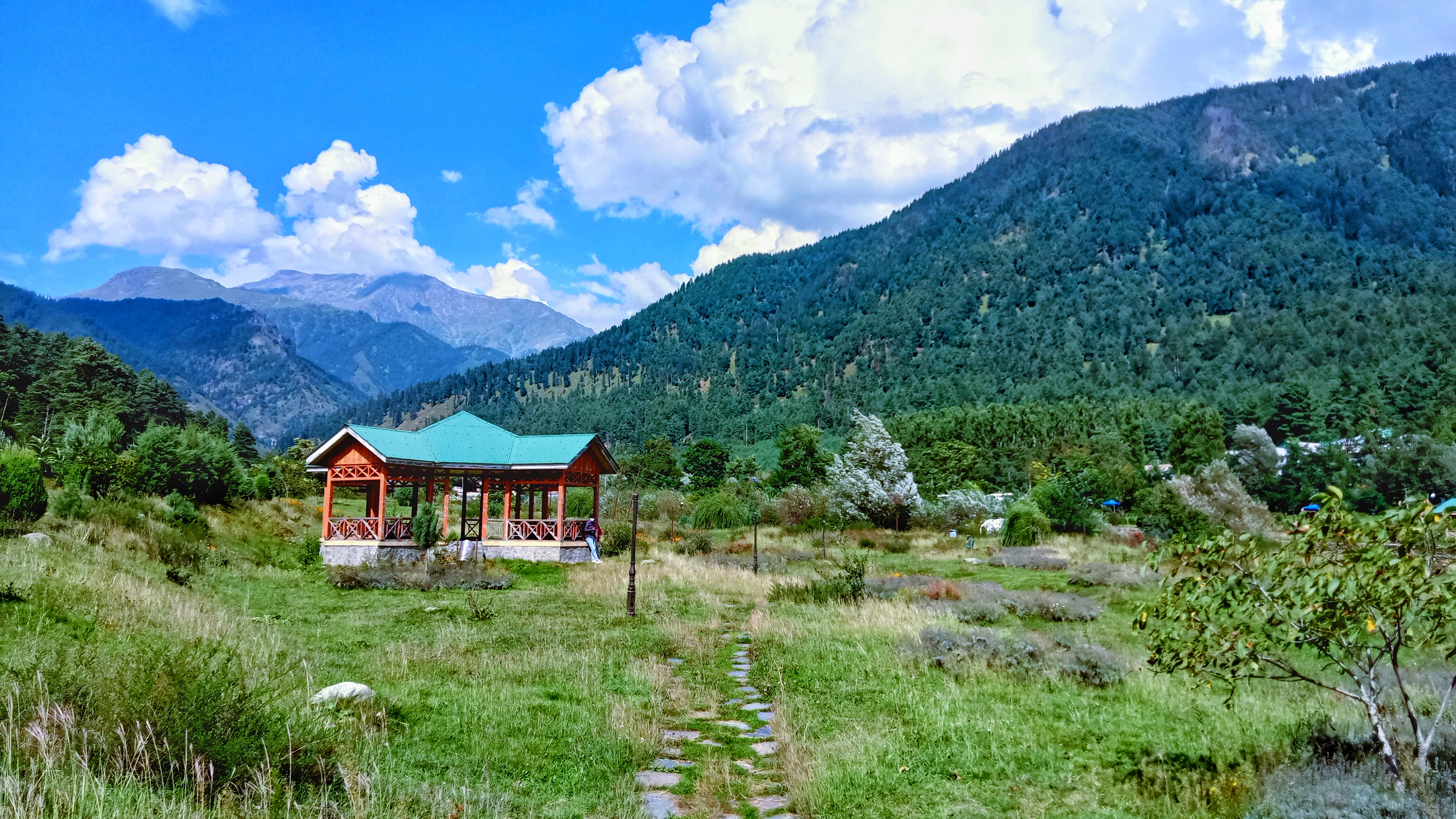
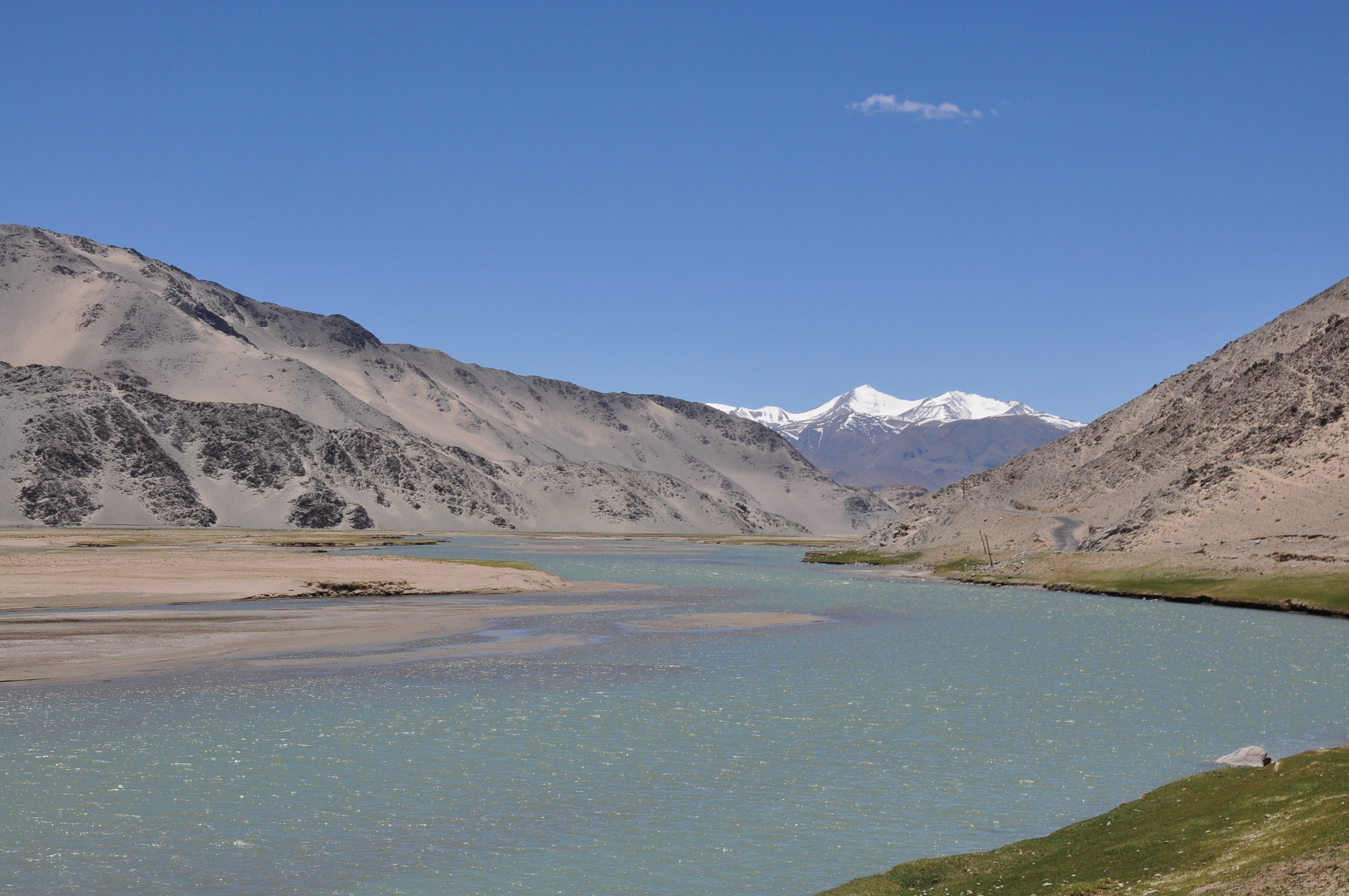
- Lidder Valley Akhnoor Fort Thajiwas Park Dal lake in Srinagar Lavender Park in Pahalgam View of River Indus on Jammu & Kashmir side

- Emblem of Jammu and Kashmir

- Location of Jammu and Kashmir administrated by India

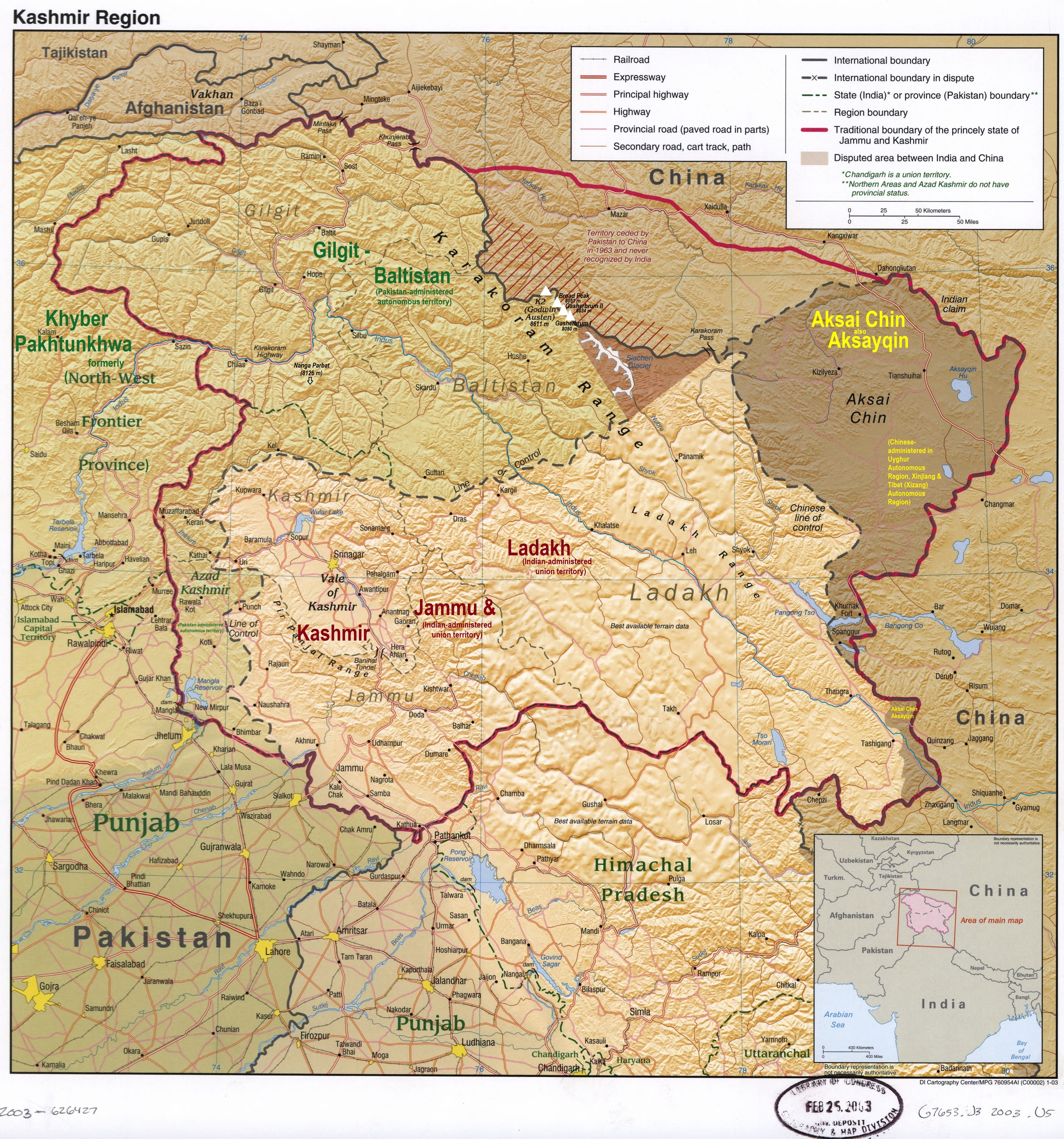
- A map of the disputed Kashmir region with the two Indian-administered union territories Jammu and Kashmir and Ladakh shown in tan.
- Interactive map of Jammu and Kashmir
- Coordinates: 33°5′24″N 74°47′24″E
- Administering state: India
- Formation: 16 March 1846; 31 October 2019 (reorganisation)
- Capitals: Srinagar (May–October); Jammu (November–April)
- Districts: 20 (2 divisions)

Government
  - Body: Government of Jammu and Kashmir
  - Lieutenant Governor: Manoj Sinha
  - Chief Minister: Omar Abdullah (JKNC)
  - Deputy Chief Minister: Surinder Kumar Choudhary (JKNC)
  - Legislature: Jammu and Kashmir Legislative Assembly (90+5) seats
  - National Parliament: Parliament of India : Rajya Sabha (4) : Lok Sabha (5)

Area
  - Total: 56,160 km^{2} (21,680 sq mi)
  - Rank: 18th (Note: Jammu and Kashmir is a disputed territory between India and Pakistan. Areas claimed by India including the Azad Kashmir region, and Minimarg region of the Astore District of Gilgit-Baltistan which are administered by Pakistan, have been included from the total area. The area would total to 56,160 km^{2}.)
- Highest elevation (Nun Peak): 7,135 m (23,409 ft)
- Lowest elevation (Chenab River): 247 m (810 ft)

Population (2011)
  - Total: 12,267,013
  - Density: 218.4/km^{2} (565.7/sq mi)

Languages
  - Official: Kashmiri, Dogri, Hindi, Urdu, English
  - Spoken: Gujari, Pahari, Punjabi, Bhadarwahi, Sarazi, Shina, Burushaski, Bateri
- Time zone: UTC+05:30 (IST)
- ISO 3166 code: IN-JK
- Vehicle registration: JK
- HDI (2023): ▲0.760 (High) (6th)
- Literacy (2024): 82.0% (26th)
- Website: jk.gov.in

Jammu (Note: Pronounced variably as /ˈdʒæmuː/ JAM-oo or /ˈdʒʌmuː/ JUM-oo.) and Kashmir (Note: Pronounced variably as /ˈkæʃmɪər/ KASH-meer or /kæʃˈmɪər/ kash-MEER.) (abbr. J&K) is a region administered by India as a union territory consisting of the southern portion of the larger Kashmir region, which has been the subject of a border dispute between India and Pakistan since 1947 and between India and China since 1959.

The Line of Control separates Jammu and Kashmir from the Pakistani-administered territories of Azad Kashmir and Gilgit-Baltistan in the west and north respectively. It lies to the north of the Indian states of Himachal Pradesh and Punjab and to the west of Ladakh which is administered by India as a union territory. Insurgency in Jammu and Kashmir has persisted in protest over autonomy and rights. In 2019, the Jammu and Kashmir Reorganisation Act was passed, reconstituting the former state of Jammu and Kashmir into two union territories: Ladakh in the east and the residuary Jammu and Kashmir in the west. Srinagar and Jammu jointly serve as the capital of the region, which is divided into two divisions and 20 districts.

Jammu and Kashmir holds substantial mineral deposits, including sapphire, borax, and graphite. Agriculture and services drive the economy, with major contributors being horticulture, handicrafts, and tourism. Apple cultivation is one of the largest industries, employing 3.5 million people and producing 10% of the gross state domestic product. Despite these activities, over 10% of the population lives below the national poverty line.

== Terminology ==
Jammu and Kashmir is named after the two regions it encompasses: the Jammu region and the Kashmir Valley. India collectively refers to the parts of Kashmir under Pakistani administration as "Pakistan-occupied Kashmir" (POK), and considers the region corresponding to Azad Kashmir as part of Jammu and Kashmir. Pakistan collectively refers to the Indian-administered territories of Kashmir as "Indian-occupied Kashmir" (IOK) or "Indian-held Kashmir" (IHK). Neutral sources use "Indian-administered Kashmir"/"Pakistan-administered Kashmir" and "Indian-controlled Kashmir"/"Pakistan-controlled Kashmir" to demarcate the areas.

== History ==
After the Indo-Pakistani war of 1947–1948, three distinct areas of the princely state of Jammu and Kashmir were under Indian control: Muslim-majority Kashmir Valley, Hindu-majority Jammu region, and Buddhist-dominated Ladakh district. These regions were constituted as Jammu and Kashmir state and accorded special status by Article 370 of the Constitution of India, adopted in 1950. In contrast to other states of India, Jammu and Kashmir established its own constitution, flag, and administrative autonomy. In 1954, Article 35A was introduced via a Presidential Order under Article 370, empowering the Jammu and Kashmir Legislature to define permanent residents and bar Indian citizens from other states from purchasing property. From the early 1950s, Jammu and Kashmir used the titles of Prime Minister and Sadr-e-Riyasat for its executive heads, as permitted under Article 370 and formalised in the Delhi Agreement of 1952. The Constituent Assembly, tasked with drafting the constitution and deciding Article 370's future, adopted the constitution of Jammu and Kashmir in 1957 and then dissolved without recommending 370's abrogation, leading to the provision's indefinite continuation.

In 1953, Sheikh Abdullah, the first Prime Minister of Jammu and Kashmir, was dismissed and jailed by the Indian government over charges of conspiracy, accused of espousing the creation of an independent country. Over the following decades, Article 370 was steadily diluted through presidential orders that extended various provisions of the Indian constitution to the state without full legislative consent, weakening its autonomy. This deepened political disillusionment, particularly in the Kashmir Valley. In 1965, through a Presidential Order, the Bakshi Ghulam Mohammad-led Congress government in Jammu and Kashmir amended the constitution to replace the titles of Prime Minister and Sadr-e-Riyasat with Chief Minister and Governor, aligning them with other Indian states. Abdullah was released in 1968 and, following the Indira–Sheikh Accord of 1975, returned to power as chief minister after a political reconciliation with the central government. After his death in 1982, unrest and violence persisted in the Kashmiri Valley and, following a disputed state election in 1987, an insurgency persisted in protest over autonomy and rights. In the early 1990s, amid the rise of militancy and targeted violence, a mass exodus of Kashmiri Hindus occurred from the Kashmir Valley. Through the 1990s and 2000s, the region witnessed prolonged violence between insurgent groups and Indian security forces.

While Article 370 had come to be seen as effectively permanent, it historically faced ideological opposition. In the 1950s, Syama Prasad Mookerjee, founder of the Bharatiya Jana Sangh (BJS), opposed Article 370 on grounds that it hindered national integration and created unequal constitutional treatment. In their 2019 Indian general election manifesto, the Bharatiya Janata Party (successor to the BJS) pledged its revocation. After its victory, the Parliament of India passed resolutions to repeal Article 370 in August 2019, and Article 35A was abolished through suspension of the 1954 Presidential Order. At the same time, a reorganisation act was also passed to reconstitute the state into two union territories: the new union territory of Ladakh, with the residual state continuing as the union territory of Jammu and Kashmir. The reorganisation took effect from 31 October 2019. In the days that followed, nearly 4,000 people, including two former Chief Ministers and hundreds of other politicians, were arrested by the Indian authorities in Kashmir; the state was put under a lockdown and communication and internet services were suspended.

In April 2020, the government notified a domicile law to replace the previous 'permanent residents' scheme. Under the new law, any one that resided in Jammu and Kashmir for 15 years, or studied for seven years and appeared for Class 10 and Class 12 exams, would be deemed to be a 'domicile'. Government officials that served in Jammu and Kashmir for 10 years and their children also become eligible for domicile status.

On 11 December 2023, the Supreme Court of India unanimously upheld the abrogation of Articles 370 and 35A, while also directing the union government to restore the statehood of Jammu and Kashmir and hold legislative assembly elections no later than September 2024. The assembly election was held from September to October 2024. The alliance led by Jammu and Kashmir National Conference formed the first government of the residual union territory with Omar Abdullah as chief minister.

== Geography ==
=== Topography ===
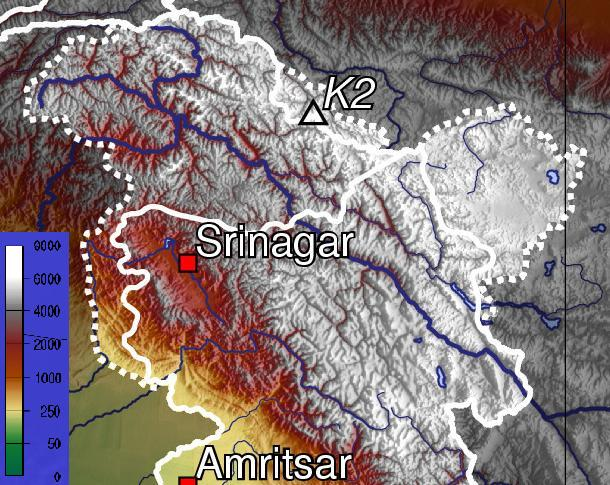
Topographic map of Jammu and Kashmir, with visible altitude for the Kashmir Valley and Jammu region.

Jammu and Kashmir is home to several valleys such as the Kashmir Valley, Tawi Valley, Chenab Valley, Poonch Valley, Sind Valley, and Lidder Valley. The Kashmir Valley is 100 km (62 mi) wide and 15,520.3 km^{2} (5,992.4 sq mi) in area. The Himalayas divide the Kashmir Valley from the Tibetan Plateau while the Pir Panjal range, which encloses the valley from the west and the south, separates it from the Punjab Plain of the Indo-Gangetic Plain. Along the northeastern flank of the Valley runs the main range of the Himalayas. This valley has an average height of 1,850 metres (6,070 ft) above sea-level, but the surrounding Pir Panjal range has an average elevation of 10,000 feet (3,000 m). The Jhelum River is the major Himalayan river which flows through the Kashmir Valley. The southern Jammu region is mostly mountainous, with the Shivaliks, the middle and the great Himalayas running parallel to each other in a southeast–northwest direction. A narrow southwestern strip constitutes fertile plains. The Chenab, Tawi and Ravi are important rivers flowing through the Jammu region.

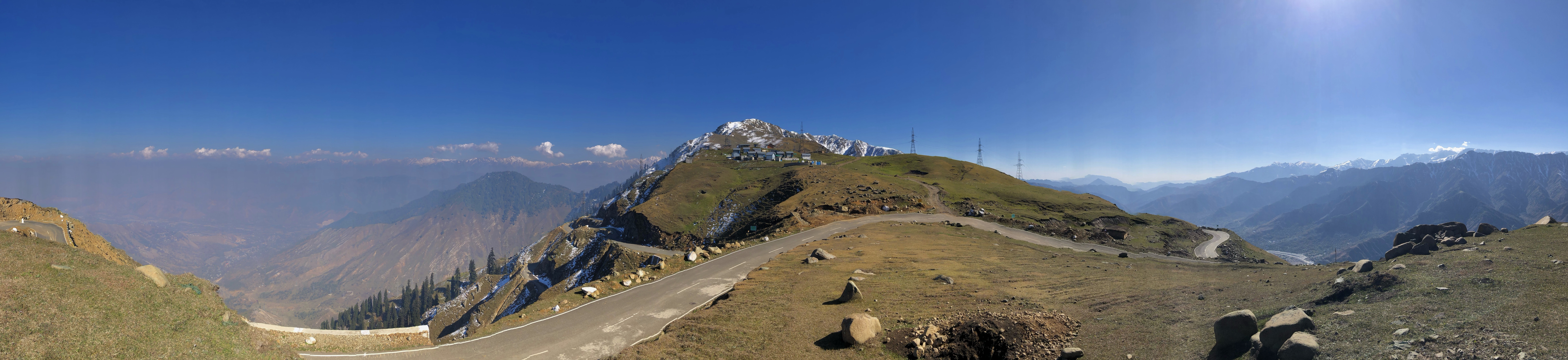
View from the Banihal pass; the pass connects the Vale of Kashmir (left) with the mountainous Jammu region (right)

=== Climate ===
The climate of Jammu and Kashmir varies with altitude and across regions. Southern and southwestern areas have a sub-tropical climate, with hot summers and cool winters. This region receives most of its rainfall during the monsoon season. In the east and north, summers are usually pleasant. The effect of the monsoon diminishes in areas lying to the leeward side of the Pir Panjal, such as the Kashmir valley, and much of the rainfall happens in the spring season due to western disturbances. Winters are cold, with temperatures reaching sub-zero levels. Snowfall is common in the valley and the mountain areas.

== Administrative divisions ==
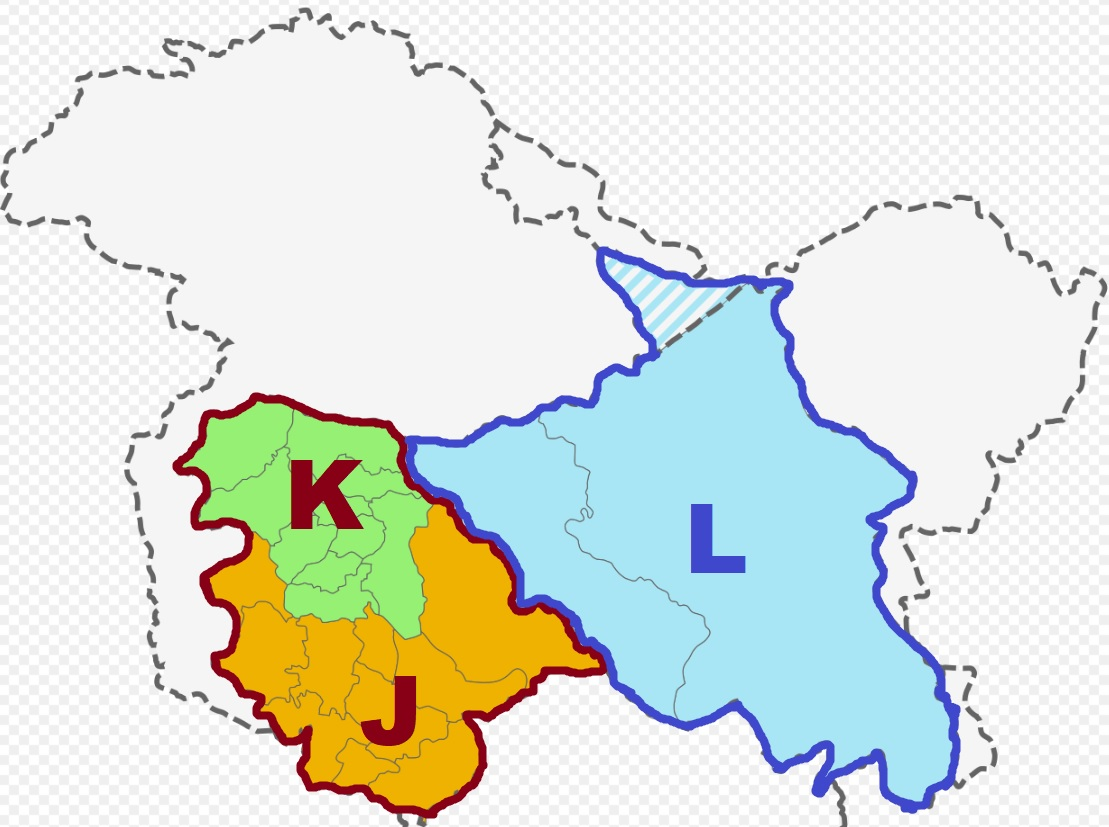
Jammu and Kashmir union territory (J and K) is bordered in carmine colour. Ladakh union territory (L) is bordered in blue colour.

The union territory of Jammu and Kashmir consists of two divisions: Jammu Division and Kashmir Division, and is further divided into 20 districts.

Division	Name	Headquarters	Area (km^{2})	Area (sq miles)	Rural Area (km^{2})	Urban Area (km^{2})	Ref
Jammu	Kathua district	Kathua	2,502	966	2,458.84	43.16	
Jammu	Jammu district	Jammu	2,342	904	2,089.87	252.13	
Jammu	Samba district	Samba	904	349	865.24	38.76	
Jammu	Udhampur district	Udhampur	2,637	1,018	2,593.28	43.72	
Jammu	Reasi district	Reasi	1,719	664	1,679.99	39.01	
Jammu	Rajouri district	Rajouri	2,630	1,015	2,608.11	21.89	
Jammu	Poonch district	Poonch	1,674	646	1,649.92	24.08	
Jammu	Doda district	Doda	8,912	3,441	8,892.25	19.75	
Jammu	Ramban district	Ramban	1,329	513	1,313.92	15.08	
Jammu	Kishtwar district	Kishtwar	1,644	635	1,643.37	0.63	
Jammu	Total for division		26,293	10,151	25,794.95	498.05	
Kashmir	Anantnag district	Anantnag	3,574	1,380	3,475.76	98.24	
Kashmir	Kulgam district	Kulgam	410	158	360.20	49.80	
Kashmir	Pulwama district	Pulwama	1,086	419	1,047.45	38.55	
Kashmir	Shopian district	Shopian	613	237	607.43	5.44	
Kashmir	Budgam district	Budgam	1,361	525	1,311.95	49.05	
Kashmir	Srinagar district	Srinagar	1,979	764	1,684.42	294.53	
Kashmir	Ganderbal district	Ganderbal	1,049	405	233.60	25.40	
Kashmir	Bandipora district	Bandipora	345	133	295.37	49.63	
Kashmir	Baramulla district	Baramulla	4,243	1,638	4,179.44	63.56	
Kashmir	Kupwara district	Kupwara	2,379	919	2,331.66	47.34	
Kashmir	Total for division			15,948	6,156	15,226.41	721.54

== Transportation ==
=== Air ===
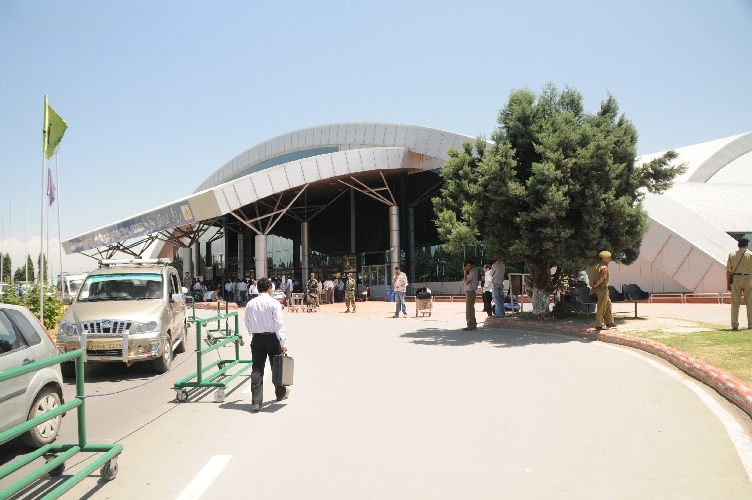
Srinagar Airport, Srinagar

Jammu and Kashmir has two major airports at the two capitals of the territory: Jammu Airport at Jammu and Srinagar Airport at Srinagar, which is also the only international airport in the territory. These airports have regular flights to Delhi, Mumbai, Bangalore, Chandigarh and other major cities of the country. In 2025, Jammu Airport began undergoing expansion, including a 45,000 m² terminal with night-landing capabilities. Srinagar Airport is also undergoing expansion, with the construction of a 71,500 m² terminal. In 2025, Udhampur Air Force Station was assessed by a government committee for the feasibility of launching commercial flight operations as an airport. An aerial ropeway for Shankaracharya Temple in Srinagar is planned for completion in 2026 and will cut ascent time from 30 minutes to five minutes.

=== Railway ===
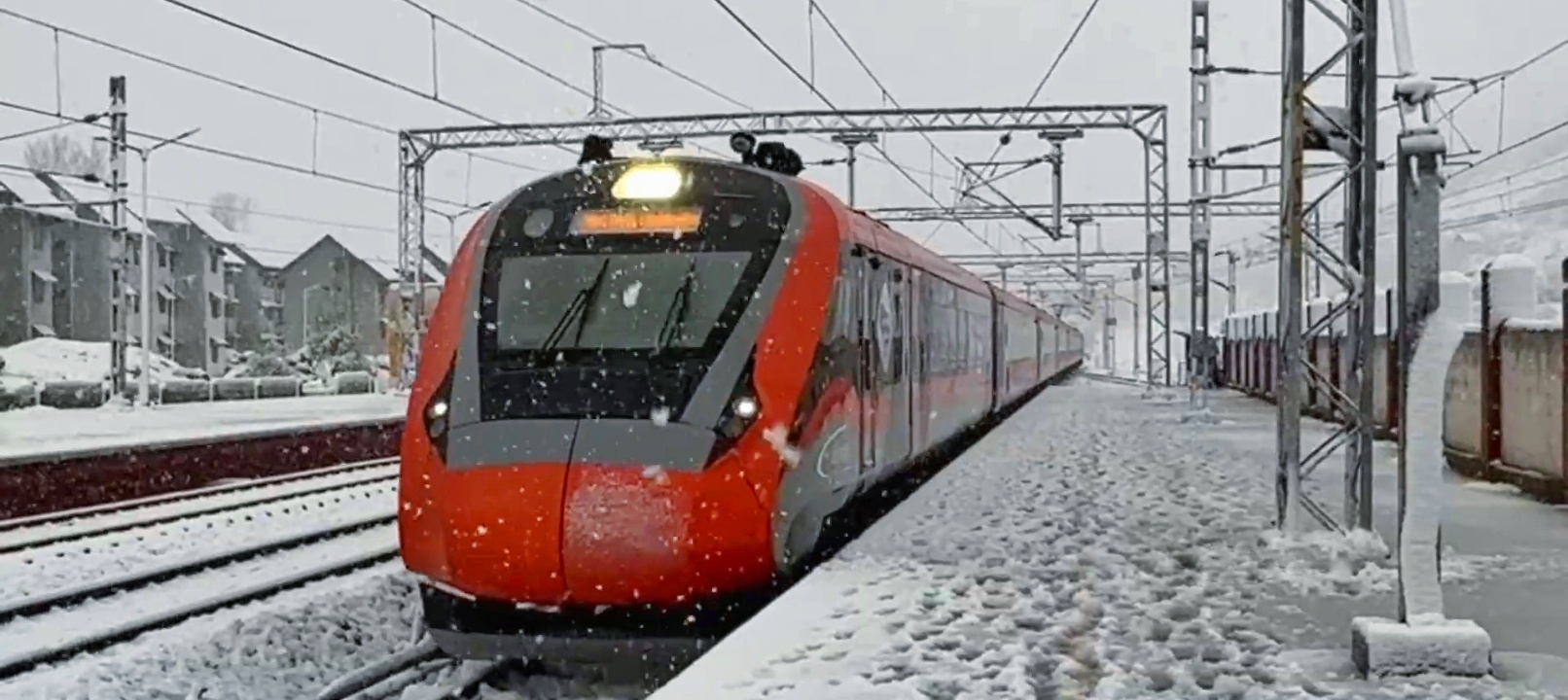
Jammu Tawi–Srinagar Vande Bharat Express at Banihal railway station

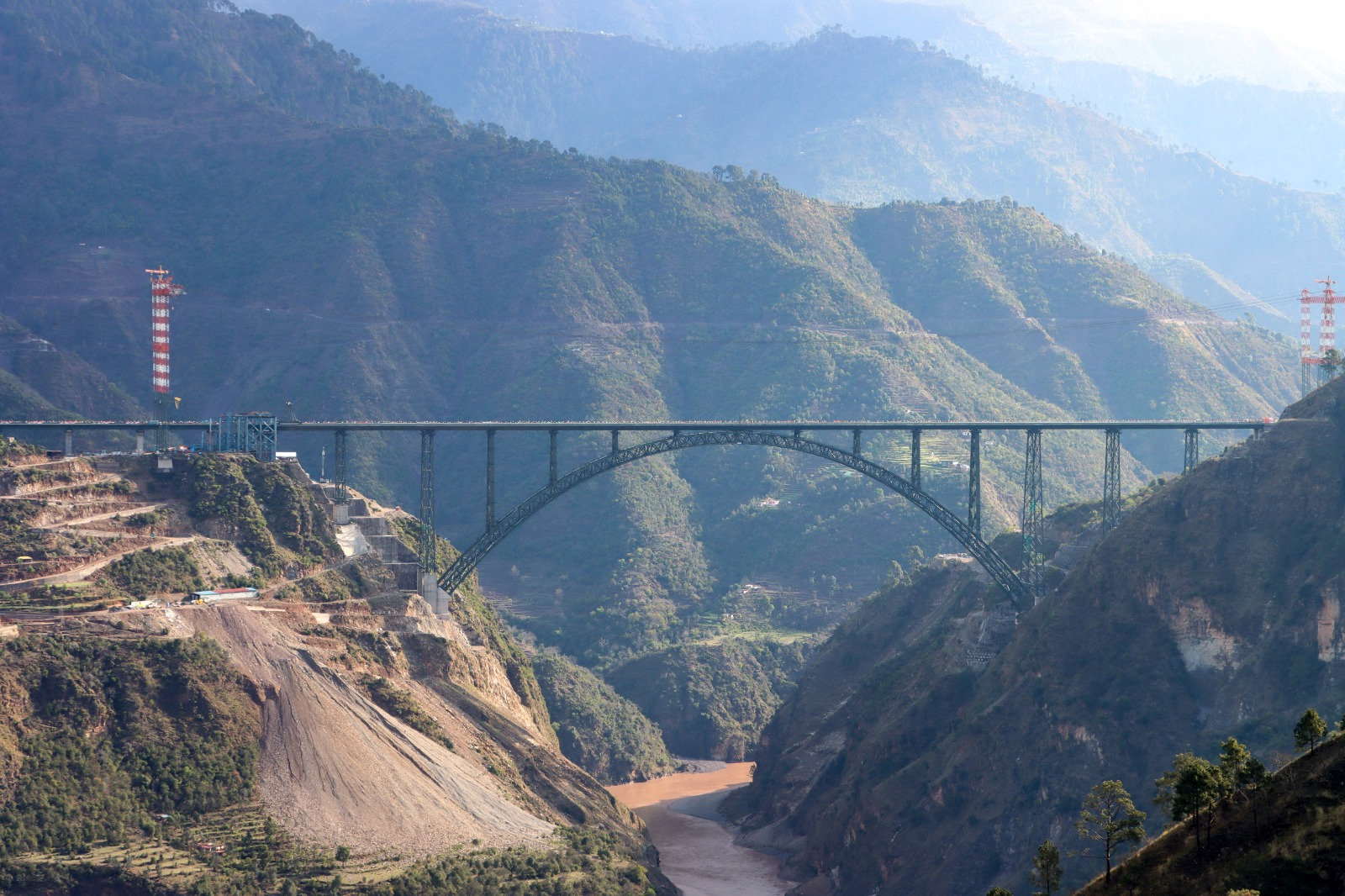
Chenab Rail Bridge on the Jammu–Baramulla line

The Jammu–Baramulla line of the Northern Railways is the only major railway line in Jammu and Kashmir. Its completion integrates the Kashmir Valley into India’s national rail grid and provides a direct rail link from other parts of India to the region. The line comprises Chenab Rail Bridge, the highest railway bridge in the world, and Anji Khad Bridge, the only cable-stayed railway bridge in India. The Udhampur-Srinagar-Baramulla Rail Link, a 272 km broad-gauge line that connects the Kashmir Valley to mainland India, achieved completion in December 2024 with the Reasi-Katra section (17 km), which features the Chenab Rail Bridge. The Banihal-Baramulla segment (118 km), among others, is electrified.

The Jammu railway division, established in January 2025, oversees 742 km of operational tracks. It manages routes such as Pathankot-Jammu-Udhampur-Srinagar-Baramulla, Bhogpur Sirwal-Pathankot, Batala-Pathankot, and Pathankot-Joginder Nagar. The division oversees the operation of Vande Bharat Express trains between Jammu and Srinagar.

=== Roads ===
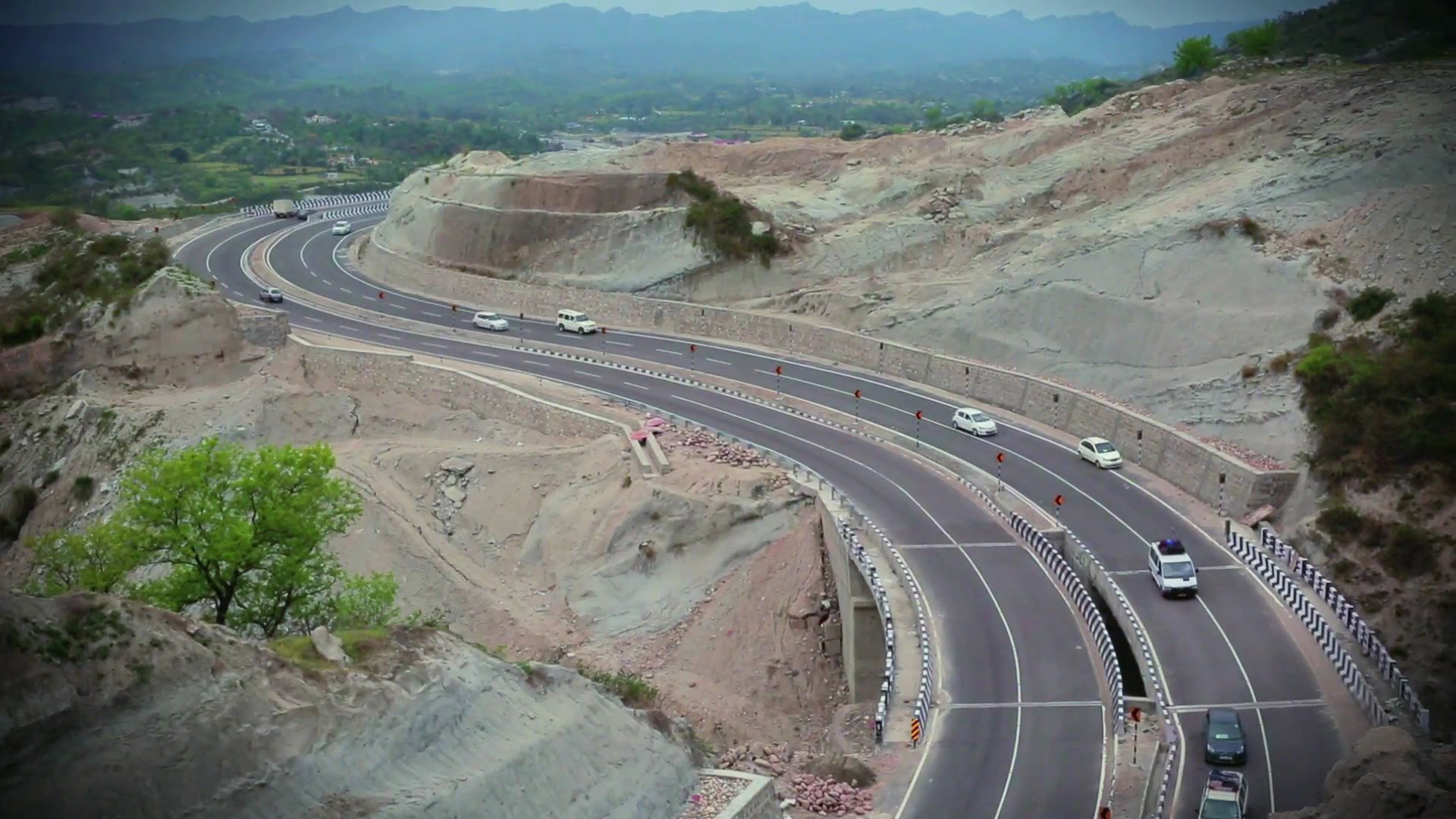
Jammu–Srinagar National Highway

As of August 2022, the total road network in Jammu and Kashmir encompasses 41,141 km. There are 11 national highways, together constituting 1,752.16 km. The responsibility for road maintenance and development is distributed among multiple agencies, with the Roads & Buildings (R&B) department managing 10,461 km in Jammu division and 13,953.9 km in Kashmir division, while PMGSY oversees 6,878 km in Jammu and 3,415.4 km in Kashmir. The Border Roads Organisation, NHAI, and NHIDCL collectively manage 4,439.3 km of strategic roads.

The Jammu–Srinagar National Highway, a segment of the NH44, is the main highway in the territory connecting the two capitals by road. National Highways 1, 144, 144A, 444, 501, 701, and 701A are the other NHs in the territory. The Jammu-Srinagar National Highway is enhanced by structures like the 9 km Chenani–Nashri Tunnel. This tunnel bypasses 41 km of road length and reduces travel time by 2 hours. The Mughal Road provides an alternative 84 km route connecting Shopian district with the Poonch and Rajouri districts. This route was originally used by Mughal Emperor Akbar to conquer Kashmir and served as an ancient trade pathway. Despite its historical significance and scenic value, the route faces seasonal accessibility challenges due to heavy snowfall and remains closed during winter months.

=== Water ===
While waterways had historically served as vital routes for transportation and trade, their full potential remains largely untapped. The Inland Waterways Authority operates a regional office in Srinagar. In 2018, the rivers Jhelum, Chenab, Indus, and Ravi were accorded the status of national waterways. Water transport on the Jhelum, revived in 2021 under the Swadesh Darshan Scheme, introduced 30-seat "Bus Boats" and luxury pontoons, reducing downtown Srinagar commute times.

Dal Lake in Srinagar is a major tourist attraction, with traditional wooden shikaras operating daily. In December 2024, Uber launched a boat-hailing service on Dal Lake, allowing tourists to book shikara rides using their application.

== Demographics ==
Historical population
Year	Pop.	±% p.a.
1961	3,560,976	—
1971	4,616,632	+2.63%
1981	5,987,389	+2.63%
1991	7,837,051	+2.73%
2001	10,143,700	+2.61%
2011	12,541,302	+2.14%
2019 (Note: after reorganization)	12,267,013	−0.28%

As per the 2011 census, Jammu and Kashmir has a total population of 12,267,013. The sex ratio is 889 females per 1000 males.

=== Ethnicity ===
Kashmiris, Dogras, and Gurjars are three major ethnolinguistic groups of Jammu and Kashmir. The Gurjar community constitute more than 20% of Jammu and Kashmir's total population. Kashmiris form the majority in the Kashmir division, while Dogras form the majority in the Jammu division.

Paharis also form a significant population, mainly in the southern parts of Jammu division. In 2024, the Government of India granted Scheduled Tribe status to the Paharis.

In Jammu and Kashmir around 924,485 people (7.5% of the population) belong to scheduled castes (SC). More than 18.5% of the population belongs to the scheduled tribes (ST), (Note: This includes 1,275,106 (10.39%) who were granted the scheduled tribes (ST) status in 1991, mainly Gujjar, Bakerwal, Gaddi, and Sippi, as well as 8.16% Paharis who were granted the status in 2024. The Paddaris were also granted ST status in 2024, as were some sub-groups of the Gaddis (Gadda Brahmin) and Sippis (Koli).) and 11.4% are classified as Other Backward Classes (OBC). Forward Caste groups make up 62.5% of the population. The SCs are mostly concentrated in the Jammu division. The Gurjar and Bakarwal are the largest Scheduled Tribe of Jammu and Kashmir and they make up 69%-72% of the ST population.

=== Language ===
==== Main languages ====
Languages in Jammu & Kashmir 2011 Census of India.
1. Kashmiri (52.9%)
2. Dogri (20.5%)
3. Gujari (9.53%)
4. Pahari (7.98%)
5. Hindi (2.28%)
6. Punjabi (1.76%)
7. Others (5.10%)

Kashmiri is the most widely spoken language in Jammu and Kashmir, spoken by 53% of the population. Dogri is spoken by 20.5% and Gujari by 9.5% of the total population.

Other main languages include Pahari spoken by 7.9%, Hindi by 2.3% and Punjabi by 1.8%. Kashmiri is primarily spoken in the Kashmir Valley and in the upper reaches of the Chenab Valley, with a sizeable number of speakers in Jammu City. Dogri, is spoken throughout the plains areas of Jammu division, as well as in parts of the hills. In Poonch, Rajouri and Ganderbal districts and In the Pir Panjal Range, bordering Pakistan-administered Kashmir, the main language is Gujari spoken by the Gujjars as well as Pahari-Pothwari. In the eastern hills of Jammu division are spoken various Western Pahari languages such as Siraji and Bhaderwahi, which merge with the dialects of western Himachal Pradesh.

Urdu is also widely understood and spoken, particularly in the Kashmir region where it acts as the lingua franca alongside Kashmiri and also serves as a medium of instruction along with English, while Hindi is taught and understood in the southern areas of Jammu.

==== Other languages ====
5.1% of the population speak several minor languages, including Marathi, Bengali, Asamese, Telugu, Tamil, Maithili, Kannada, Bateri, Bhadarwahi, Brokskat, Changthang, Ladakhi, Sheikhgal, Spiti Bhoti Bhattiyali, Chambeali, Churahi, Gaddi, Hindko, Lahul Lohar, Pangwali, Shina, Balti, Pattani, and Sansi.

=== Religion ===
Religions in Jammu and Kashmir (2011)
1. Islam (68.8%)
2. Hinduism (28.8%)
3. Sikhism (1.90%)
4. Christianity (0.28%)
5. Other (0.21%)

The majority of the population of Jammu and Kashmir is Muslim and a large minority is Hindu. Most Muslims in Jammu and Kashmir belong to the Sunni sect of Islam, especially the Gurjars, Bakarwals, Sayids, Pathans, Sheikhs, Mughals, Paharis, and Doms. As per the 2011 census of India, about 68.3% of people in Jammu and Kashmir were Muslims. Hindu made up around 28.4% of the population. Other small religious groups included Sikhs at 1.9%, Buddhists at 0.9%, and Christians at 0.3%.

The population of the Kashmir Division is predominantly Muslim (96.41%) with small Hindu (2.45%) and Sikh (0.81%) communities. Shias are mostly concentrated in the Budgam district, where they form about 30–40% of the population. Among the Kashmiri Hindus, the Pandits are a significant group.

The Jammu Division is predominantly Hindu (67.5%) with a significant Muslim population (30%). The Muslims form a majority in the Rajouri (63%), Poonch (90%), Doda (54%), Kishtwar (58%) and Ramban (71%) districts of Jammu, while the Hindus form a majority in Kathua (88%), Samba (86%), Jammu (84%) and Udhampur (88%) districts. Reasi district has an almost equal number of Hindus and Muslims.

Most Dogras in the region are Hindus and belong to various Hindu castes. Paharis include both Hindu and Muslims. The Gurjars and Bakarwals are predominantly Sunni Muslims. The Dogras and various organisations of Hindu-majority Jammu region have demanded a separate state after bifurcation of the territory, on the basis of cultural, linguistic and religious differences from neighbouring Kashmiris (who are predominantly Muslim by faith). In 2022, only 808 Kashmiri Hindu Pandit families remained in the valley after their forced displacement by Islamic militants.

== Education ==
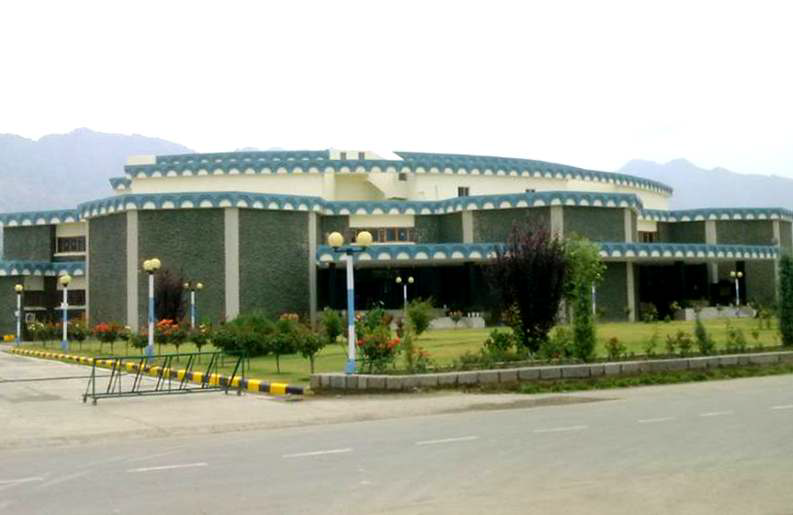
University of Kashmir

According to the 2011 census, the literacy rate in Jammu and Kashmir was 67.17%, male literacy was 75%, while female literacy was at 56.43%.

University of Kashmir located in Srinagar is the main university in the territory. Other universities include University of Jammu, Sher-e-Kashmir University of Agricultural Sciences and Technology of Kashmir, Shri Mata Vaishno Devi University, Islamic University of Science & Technology, etc. Major institutions of higher education are NIT Srinagar, IIT Jammu, IIM Jammu, NIFT Srinagar and IHM Srinagar. Medical colleges include SKIMS, and the Government Medical College in Srinagar and All India Institute of Medical Sciences, Vijaypur, Jammu.

== Government and politics ==
The union territory of Jammu and Kashmir is administered under the provisions of Article 239 of the Constitution of India. Article 239A, originally formulated for the union territory of Puduchery, is also applicable to Jammu and Kashmir.

=== Executive branch ===
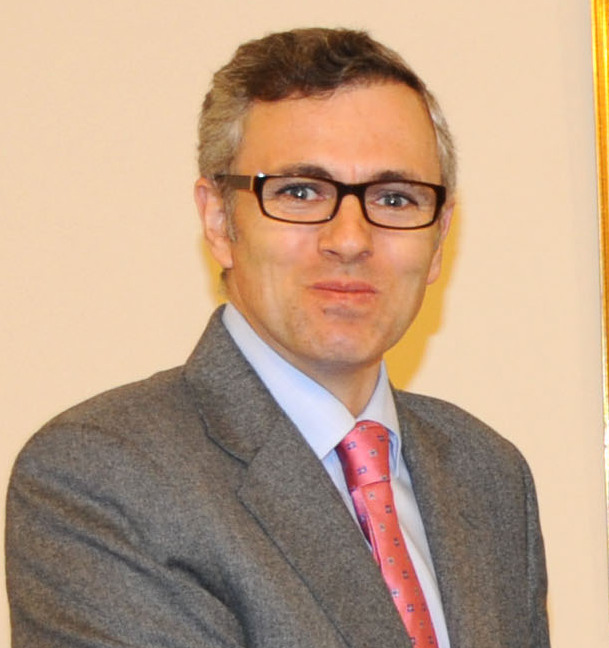
Omar Abdullah has been chief minister since October 2024.

The President of India appoints a Lieutenant Governor for the union territory. A Council of Ministers led by a Chief Minister is appointed by the Lieutenant Governor from the membership of the legislative assembly. Their role is to advise the Lieutenant Governor in the exercise of functions in matters under the jurisdiction of the legislative assembly. In other matters, the Lieutenant Governor is empowered to act in his own capacity. Omar Abdullah has been chief minister of Jammu and Kashmir since October 2024.

There are 42 administrative departments under the Government of Jammu and Kashmir, through which executive functions are carried out.

=== Legislative branch ===
Membership by party in the 13th Jammu and Kashmir Assembly

The legislative branch of government is a unicameral legislative assembly, whose tenure is five years. The legislative assembly may make laws for any of the matters in the State List of the Constitution of India except "public order" and "police", which will remain the preserve of the central Government of India. The Lieutenant Governor also has the power to promulgate ordinances which have the same force as the acts of the legislative assembly.

Elections for the Jammu and Kashmir Legislative Assembly were held in September and October 2024.

=== Judicial branch ===
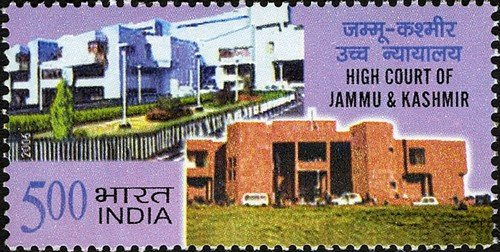
The Jammu and Kashmir High Court on postal stamps of India

The union territory is under the jurisdiction of the Jammu and Kashmir High Court, which also serves as the high court for Ladakh. Police services are provided by the Jammu and Kashmir Police.

=== Parties ===
The main political parties active in the region are the Jammu & Kashmir National Conference (leader: Omar Abdullah) the Jammu and Kashmir People's Democratic Party (President: Mehbooba Mufti) the Bharatiya Janata Party (State President: Sat Paul Sharma), the Indian National Congress (State President: Tariq Hameed Karra), and the Jammu and Kashmir People's Conference (President: Sajjad Gani Lone). Other parties with a presence in the region include the Communist Party of India (Marxist), the Jammu and Kashmir National Panthers Party, and the Jammu and Kashmir Apni Party (President: Altaf Bukhari).

=== Local government ===
The rural areas of Jammu and Kashmir are governed by Panchayati Raj Institutions under the Jammu & Kashmir Panchayati Raj Act, 1989, which was passed in March 1989. It establishes a three-tier system of local government, similar to the rest of India: Halqa Panchayat at the village level, Block Development Council at the block level, and District Development Council at the district level. There are a total of 4291 halqa panchayats, 286 block development councils, and 20 district development councils.

Urban areas of Jammu and Kashmir are governed by Urban Local Bodies under the J&K Municipal Corporation Act, 2000 and J&K Municipal Act, 2000. It provides for Municipal Corporations in cities with a population of one lakh or more, Municipal Councils for medium towns, and Municipal Committees for smaller towns. At present, there are 80 Urban Local Bodies (ULBs), including two Municipal Corporations (at Jammu and Srinagar), six Municipal Councils, and 72 Municipal Committees. Elections are held in every five years for these local bodies, and conducted by J&K State Election Commission.

=== Jammu and Kashmir in the Parliament of India ===
Jammu and Kashmir sends five members (MPs) to the lower house of the Indian parliament (the Lok Sabha) and four members to the upper house (the Rajya Sabha).

Lok Sabha constituencies in Jammu and Kashmir

Constituency No.	Constituency	Reserved for (SC/ST/None)
1	Baramulla	None
2	Srinagar	None
3	Anantnag-Rajouri	None
4	Udhampur	None
5	Jammu	None

== Economy ==
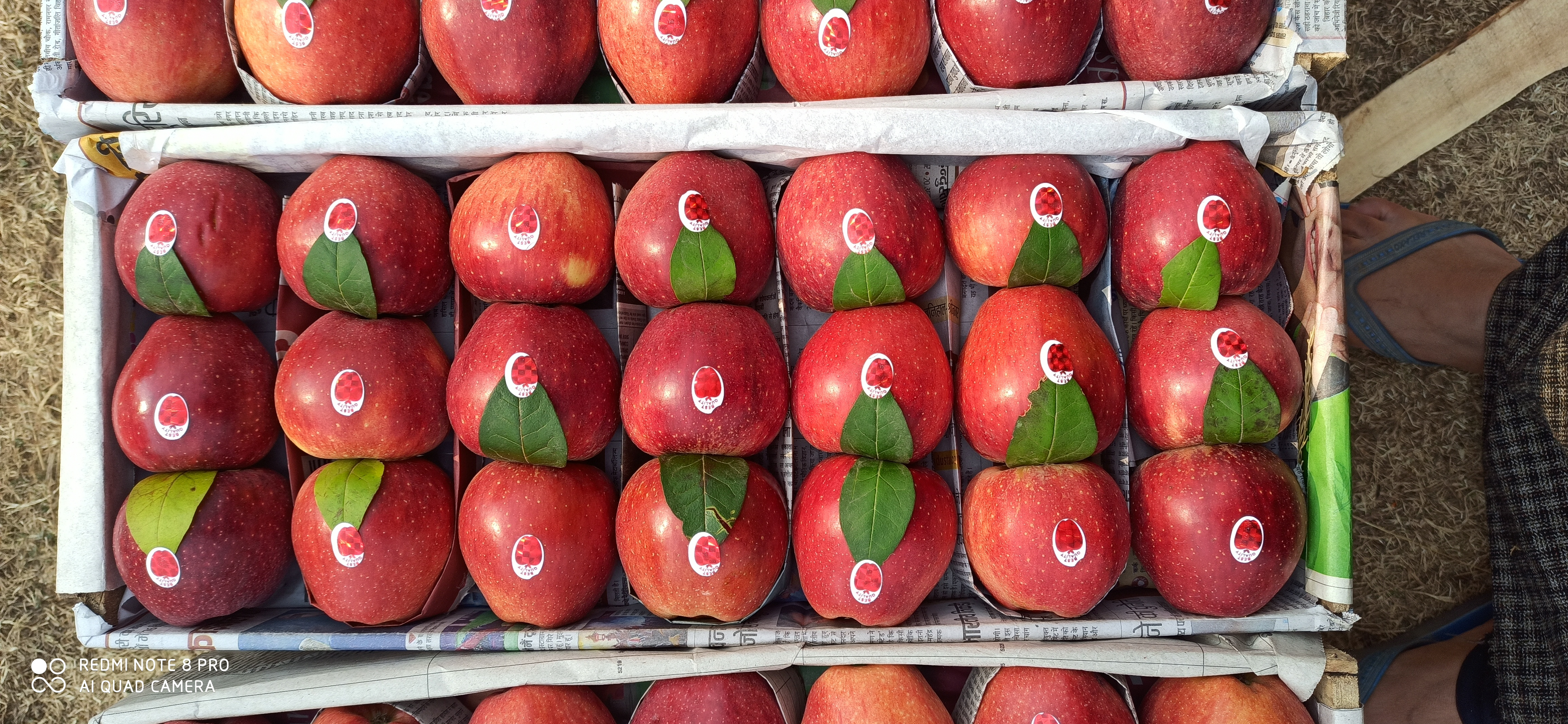
Apples of Kashmir are famous for their taste

Jammu and Kashmir's economy is primarily services-based and agriculture-oriented. The gross domestic product of Jammu and Kashmir was estimated at ₹3.15 lakh crore (US$33 billion) in 2026–27. In the fiscal year 2023–2024, it is expected that Jammu and Kashmir's Gross Domestic Product (GDP) will exceed Rs 2.30 lakh crore, with a growth rate of 10%. Along with horticulture and agriculture, tourism is an important industry for Jammu and Kashmir, accounting for about 7% to its economy.

The Kashmir Valley is known for its sericulture and cold-water fisheries. Wood from Kashmir is used to make high-quality cricket bats, popularly known as Kashmir Willow. Major agricultural exports from Jammu and Kashmir include apples, pears, cherries, plums, saffron and walnuts. The traditional Kashmiri handicrafts industry employs a large workforce of around 340 thousand artisans and has potential for producing export goods. Small-scale cottage industries include carpet weaving, silks, shawls, basketry, pottery, copper and silverware, papier-mâché and walnut wood. The horticulture sector is the next biggest source of income in the economy. The temperature of Jammu and Kashmir is also suited to floriculture and can support various species of flora.

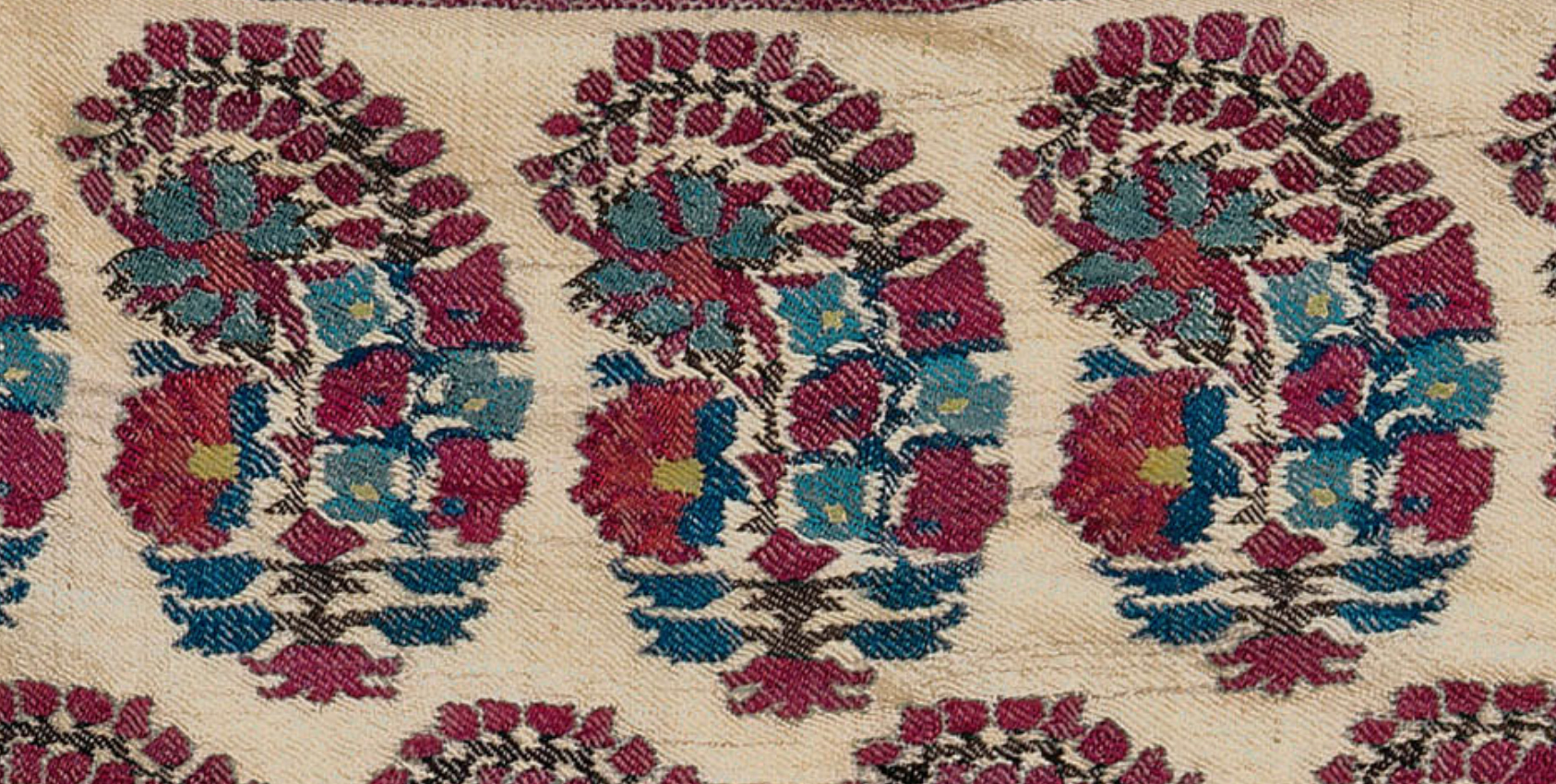
Boteh from an Antique Kashmiri Dochalla Shawl

Over 500 mineral blocks are present in Jammu and Kashmir, 261 of which are in the Kashmir Division alone. Kishtwar is known as the 'land of sapphire and saffron'. Resources such as timber, herbs and medicinal shrubs, edibles such as mushroom, chilgoza, black zeera, and saffron are available in the forests. The sapphire reserve mines of Machail, Paddar are a source of mineral wealth. Jammu and Kashmir is the only administrative unit in India with a large amount of borax and sapphire resources. It possesses 36% of the graphite, 21% marble and 14% of gypsum present in India. Coal, limestone and magnesite are found scattered among the different districts of the union territory.

Other minerals of significance that occur are bauxite, ball clay and china clay in Udhampur; bentonite in Jammu; diaspore in Rajouri and Udhampur; graphite in Baramulla; lignite and marble in Kupwara; quartz and silica sand in Anantnag, Doda, and Udhampur; and quartzite in Anantnag district. In addition, the Department of Geology and Mining has determined the presence of minerals such as magnetite, dolomite, fuel mineral, decorative building stones, slate, and gemstones. All are materials with commercial and industrial uses in many products and factories.

In the fiscal year 2019–20, total exports from Jammu and Kashmir amounted to ₹188.18 million (equivalent to ₹240 million or US$2.5 million in 2026). The Jammu & Kashmir Bank, which is listed as a NIFTY 500 conglomerate, is based in the union territory. Jammu and Kashmir is one of the largest recipients of grants from the central government annually. According to the Sustainable Development Goals Index 2021, 10.35% of the population of Jammu and Kashmir live below the national poverty line, the third-highest among union territories in the country.

=== Apple cultivation ===
The apple industry is a significant source of employment in Jammu and Kashmir, generating the highest number of jobs. It provides approximately 400-man-days of work per year per hectare of orchards, supporting a workforce of 3.5 million people. Moreover, it contributes approximately 10% to the Gross State Domestic Product (GSDP). In the year 2020–2021, the apple production in Kashmir was reported to be 1,695,000.00 metric tonnes, while in the Jammu Division, it stood at 24,415.69 metric tonnes. The combined apple production for the entire Union Territory of Jammu and Kashmir amounted to 1,719,415.69 metric tonnes. Notably, the Kashmir Valley is the primary contributor to these numbers, accounting for 75% of India's total apple production and exporting around 1.8 million metric tonnes of apples annually.

== Media ==
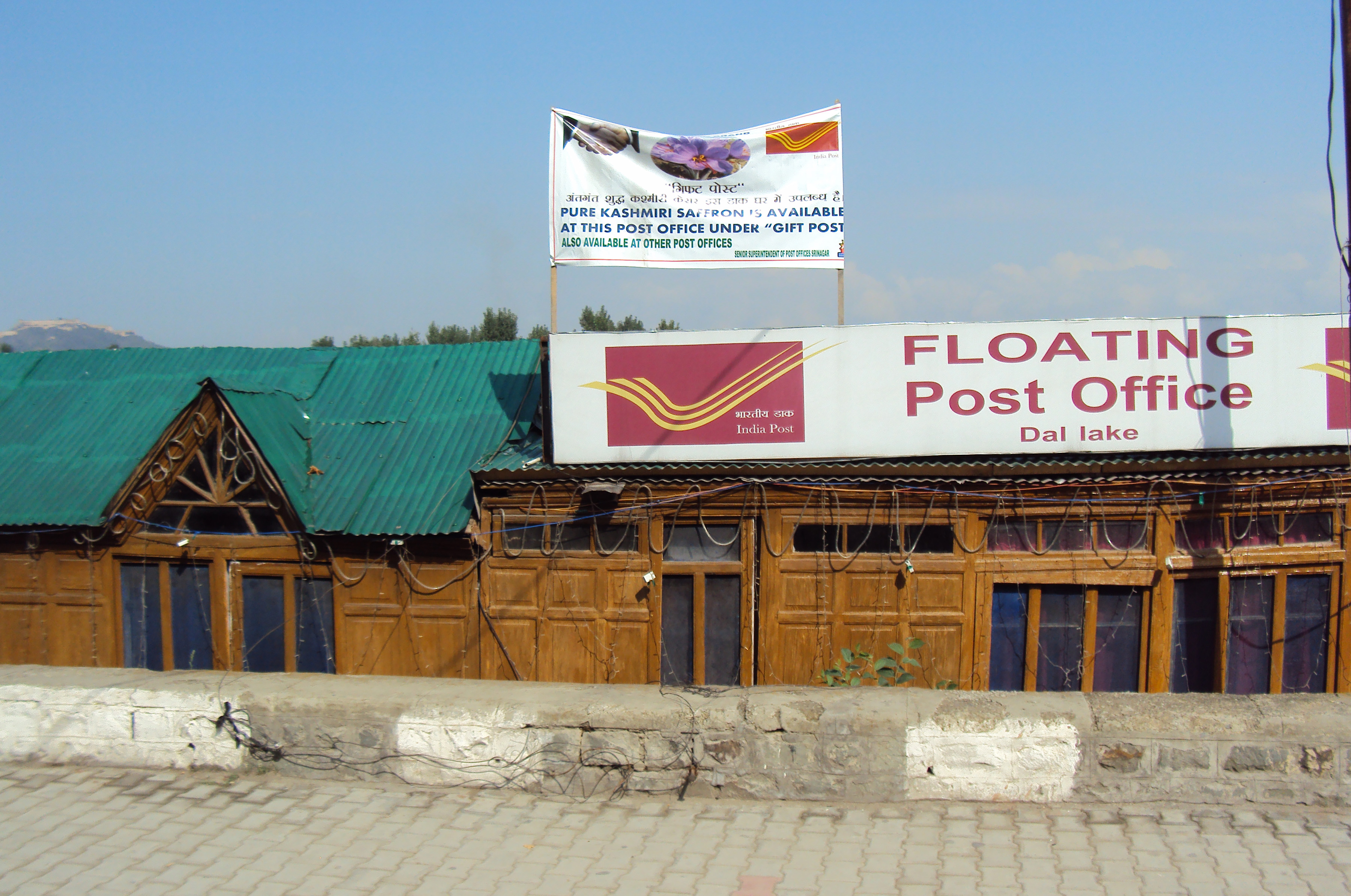
Floating Post Office, Dal Lake - Srinagar

The Telecom Regulatory Authority of India (TRAI) regulates all major aspects pertaining to media and telecommunications in Jammu and Kashmir. In addition, the Jammu and Kashmir administration released their media policy in 2020 which enabled government officers to sanction journalists and media organisations for disseminating "fake news", and is valid for the next five years. The policy attracted criticism for allegedly reducing people to "passive recipients of the information the government intends to disseminate." The Press Council of India (PCI) expressed concern over the provisions of fake news in the policy, as it "interferes with the free functioning of the press."

Major periodicals in Jammu and Kashmir include Greater Kashmir, Rising Kashmir, Kashmir Times, Daily Excelsior, Elite Kashmir and Kashmir Monitor. DD Kashir is the state-owned television broadcaster. Popular private television channels are ETV Urdu and Gulistan News. In association with All India Radio, DD Kashir has established high power transmitters along the India–Pakistan border. Radio Sharda, a worldwide community radio service for Kashmiri Pandits, was started by Ramesh Hangloo. FM Tadka 95.0, BIG FM 92.7, Radio Mirchi and Red FM 93.5 are private FM radio stations.

Internet shutdowns are frequent in Jammu and Kashmir. As of February 2021, the region had 300 internet shutdowns since 2012. In 2020 alone, this number was 115, the highest of any year.

== Sports ==
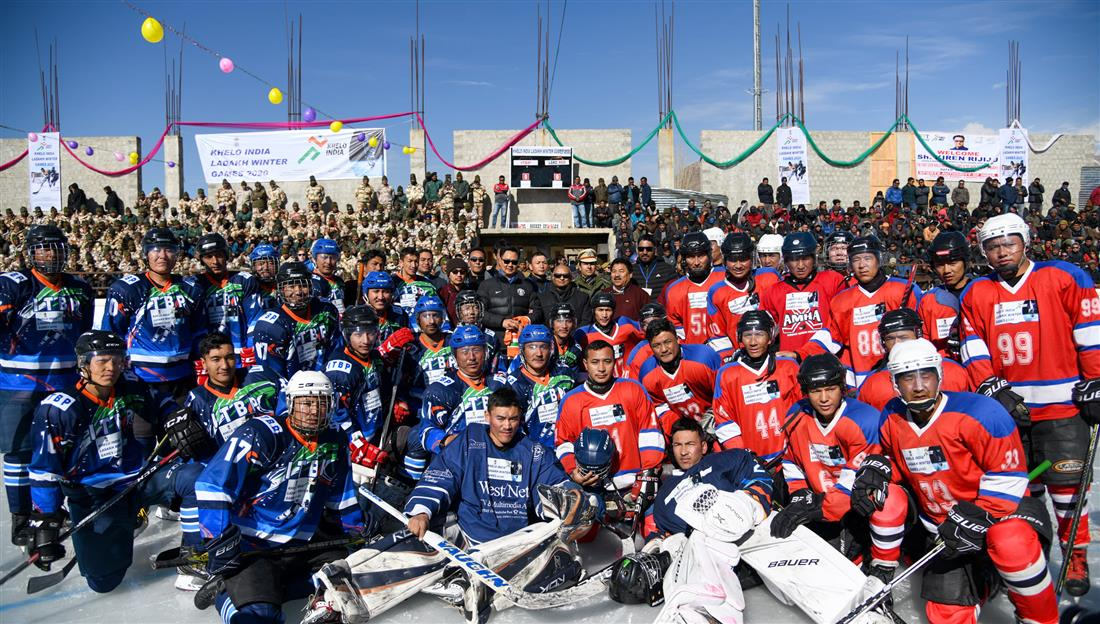
Inauguration of the first Khelo India Winter Games

Sports tournaments in Jammu and Kashmir are organised by both the Indian army and police, as well as mainstream political parties and the All Parties Hurriyat Conference. Sportspersons who represent India in tournaments face stigmatisation from separatists.

Jammu and Kashmir has 18 stadiums, 23 training centres, three indoor sports complexes and 42 government-maintained playing fields. Srinagar is home to the Sher-i-Kashmir Stadium, a stadium where international cricket matches have been played. The Maulana Azad Stadium in Jammu is one of the home venues for the Jammu and Kashmir cricket team. The Bakshi Stadium in Srinagar, named after Bakshi Ghulam Mohammad, hosts football matches.

Institutions such as the Jawahar Institute of Mountaineering and Winter Sports provides mountaineering, skiing and adventure courses. The Royal Springs Golf Course, Srinagar, located on the banks of Dal lake, is considered one of the best golf courses in India. Jammu and Kashmir was also host to the first Khelo India Winter Games, held in 2020 in Gulmarg. Jammu and Kashmir came first with the most gold medals at 26, followed by the Indian Army team with 8 gold medals. The second edition of the winter games were also held in Gulmarg in 2021, with Jammu and Kashmir coming first again.

== Tourism ==
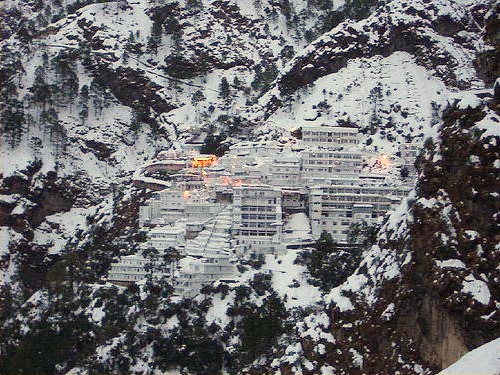
Vaishno Devi Temple in winter

Tourism is a significant pillar for Jammu and Kashmir's economy, contributing substantially to employment and the gross domestic product. Estimates suggest that tourism accounts for around 7–15% of Jammu and Kashmir’s GDP, with approximately half of the population engaged directly or indirectly in tourism-related activities. The sector supports a wide range of economic activities, including hospitality, handicrafts, transport, and local services, and is vital for the socio-economic development of the territory.

Some major tourist attractions are Srinagar, the Mughal Gardens, Gulmarg, Pahalgam, Patnitop, Bhaderwah and Jammu. Every year, thousands of Hindu pilgrims visit holy shrines of Vaishno Devi and Amarnath which has had significant impact on the economy. The Kashmir valley is one of the top tourist destinations in India. Gulmarg, one of the most popular ski resort destinations in India, is also home to the world's highest green golf course. The government has prioritised the development of tourism infrastructure and the promotion of both traditional and off-beat destinations, aiming to expand the sector and ensure sustainable growth.

The tourism industry in Jammu and Kashmir has been profoundly affected by periods of insurgency, political instability, and violence. The onset of militancy in the late 1980s led to a dramatic decline in tourist arrivals, especially in the Kashmir Valley. For instance, tourist numbers in the valley fell from over 550,000 in 1989 to fewer than 10,000 in 1996, with both domestic and foreign tourism severely impacted. The Jammu region, while less affected, also experienced a reduction in visitors during periods of heightened unrest. Episodes of violence and terror attacks have repeatedly disrupted the sector, leading to mass cancellations and long-term damage to the region's image as a safe destination. Notably, the 2019 advisory from the Government of India, following the abrogation of Article 370, resulted in the abrupt evacuation of tourists and a near-complete shutdown of the industry. Terror attacks such as the 2025 Pahalgam attack, which resulted in significant loss of life, have led to widespread cancellations, a sharp decline in bookings, and the closure of many tourist sites as part of security measures.

The immediate aftermath of such incidents typically sees a steep drop in tourist arrivals, with ripple effects on employment and local businesses dependent on tourism. The sector’s recovery often takes several years, and recurring instability continues to act as a major constraint on its full potential. Despite these challenges, the region has demonstrated resilience, with tourism numbers rebounding during periods of relative calm. Periods of decrease in violence boosts tourism. In 2024, Jammu and Kashmir recorded over 23 million tourist visits. However, the volatility associated with insurgency is a persistent obstacle to sustainable tourism development.

== See also ==
- Kashmiriyat
- Kashmiri cinema
- Literature of Kashmir
- Music of Jammu and Kashmir
- Kus Bani Koshur Karorpaet
- AIR Srinagar
- Central University of Kashmir
- Central University of Jammu
- Real Kashmir F.C.
- Jammu and Kashmir football team
- Jammu and Kashmir Light Infantry
- Jammu and Kashmir Rifles
- Fauna of Jammu and Kashmir
- Mansar-Surinsar Wildlife Sanctuary
