= Mansar-Surinsar Lakes Wildlife Sanctuary =

Sanctuary in Jammu and Kashmir (union territory), India

Mansar-Surinsar Lakes Wild Life sanctuary in Samba, Jammu and Kashmir (union territory)
- IUCN category IV (habitat/species management area)
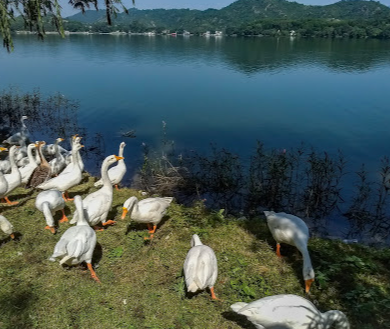
- Birds in Mansar Lake in Samba district (J&K)

- Location within Jammu and Kashmir Location within India
- Interactive map of Mansar-Surinsar Lakes Wild Life sanctuary in Samba, Jammu and Kashmir (union territory)
- Location: Mansar, Samba district, Jammu and Kashmir (union territory), India
- Nearest city: Samba town
- Coordinates: 32°45′N 75°12′E
- Area: 3.5 km^{2} (860 acres)
- Established: 2005
- Governing body: Jammu and Kashmir (union territory)

Ramsar Wetland
- Designated: 8/11/2005

Mansar-Surinsar Lakes Wildlife sanctuary is a wildlife sanctuary is situated in Mansar in Samba district in Indian union territory of Jammu and Kashmir. It is located 19 km from Samba town & 85 km from city of Jammu. It covers 3.5 square kilometers. It was established in 2005, under the Wildlife Protection Act of 1972. The sanctuary protects Mansar Lake - Surinsar Lake & wetland, which gained Ramsar Convention for International importance in 2005.

== Geography ==
Mansar-Surinsar Lakes Wildlife sanctuary are two lakes 9 km physically apart but internally connected, located in the Samba district of Jammu and Kashmir (union territory) covering an area of 3.5 sq km. Instead of a lake usually found in depressions, Mansar-Surinsar lakes are located on top of a hill without any feeding water source with a low catchment area and a limited rainfall of about 1400 mm annually. Anticline structure and Artesian well like conditions results in perennial source of lake waters with A-Class TDS water.

== See also ==
- Bird sanctuaries of India
- Fauna of Jammu and Kashmir
