= Kashmiri handicrafts =

Traditional arts of Jammu and Kashmir, India

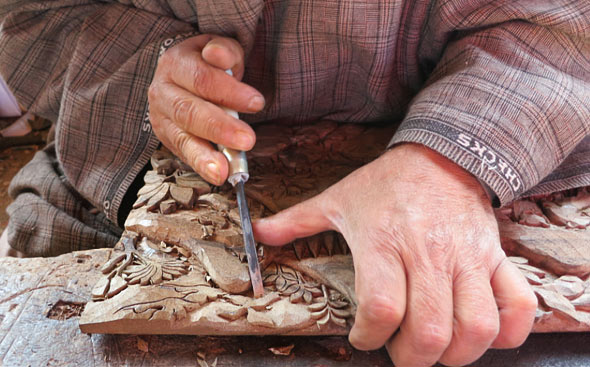
Kashmiri artisan carving walnut wood

Kashmiri handicrafts are the traditional art of the Kashmiri people and artisans who make, craft, and decorate objects by hand. Ganderbal and Budgam are the main districts in central Kashmir producing handicrafts. The region, including Srinagar, Ganderbal, and Budgam, is also known for its cultural heritage and handicraft industry. Embroidery is an integral part of many Kashmiri handicrafts; shawls, carpets and Kashmiri ladies' pherans are adorned with intricate embroidery or flower designs made with thin metal threads, known as 'Tille' in Kashmiri. Conventionally, both men and women in the region do embroidery work.

Kashmir is famous for its artistry in palkis, bedsheets, trunks, inkstands, boxes, and spoons; furthermore, its shawl-making is considered exceptional. Kashmiris traditionally make different types of handicraft products from simple items and materials. Handmade decorated metallic bags for women are also popular. Notable areas include textiles, carpets and rugs, crewel embroidery, phool kari, silverware, woodwork, and papier-mâché, etc.

Handicraft provide a livelihood for many artisans in Kashmir.

== Kashmir papier-mâché ==
Kashmir paper-mâché is, a craft that was brought by Muslim saint Mir Sayyid Ali Hamadani from Persia in the 14th century to Kashmir. It is based primarily on paper pulp, and is richly decorated and colourful. It is generally seen in the form of vases, bowls, or cups (with and without metal rims), boxes, trays, bases of lamps, and many other small objects.

Kashmiri papier-mâché forms are simple, with artisans painting intricate designs requiring great skill and precision. The paintings are either flat or raised, the latter resembling relief work. Birds, butterflies, flowers, and foliage are often depicted. Patterns are drawn freehand by the master Naqqashi, with assistants filling colors at various stages. The master then completes the outline, and the piece is finished with a varnish coating.

== Kashmir walnut wood carving ==
Kashmir walnut wood carving is a craft of fine wood carving. The Juglans regia tree that grows widely in Kashmir region is used for wood carving, and Kashmir is one of the places where walnut trees are available. Walnut wood is used to make tables, jewelry boxes, trays, lamps etc.

== Clothing ==
Kashmir was the center for woolen materials. Various kinds of shawls were a popular products of Kashmir.

=== Kashmir shawl ===
Shawls have been a foreign import to Kashmir by Muslim craftsmen from Turkestan as late as the 15th century. Persian masters were brought by the third Mughal emperor Akbar, that improved the local craft and techniques of shawl and carpet weaving.

The Kashmir shawl is a type of shawl distinctive for its Kashmiri weave, and traditionally made of shahtoosh or pashmina wool.

François Bernier, witnessing the shawl industry first hand, emphasizes that great pains "have been taken to manufacture shawls similar to those of Kashmir, in Patna, Agra, and Lahore but notwithstanding every possible care, they never have the texture and softness of the Kashmir article, whose unrivalled excellence may be owing to certain properties in the water of that country. Kashmiri Shawls are mainly sold at Polo View Srinagar( The Capital of J&K) by M/s GM Shah. One of the biggest exporter of the Kashmiri Handicrafts"

— References

=== Pashmina or Kar Amir ===
The majority of the woollen fabrics of Kashmir, and particularly the best quality shawls, were and are still made of Pashm or Pashmina, which is the wool of Capra hircus, a species of the wild Asian mountain goat. Hence the shawls came to be called Pashmina.

=== Do-Shala ===
Emperor Akbar was a great admirer of Kashmiri shawls. It was he who began the fashion of wearing two shawls, sewn back to back, so that the under surfaces of the shawls were never seen. During that time the most desired shawls were those worked in gold and silver thread or shawls with border ornamented with fringes of gold, silver and silk thread.

The Do-shala, as the name designates ("two-shawls"), are always sold in pairs, there being many varieties of them. In the Khali-matan the central field is quite plain and without any ornamentation.

=== Kani Shawl ===
Kani shawl is another type of Kashmir shawl originating from the Kanihama area of Kashmir. It is one of the oldest handicrafts of Kashmir. This craft has been a part of the valley since the time of Mughals. The shawls are woven from pashmina yarn.

== Carpets, rugs and mats ==
Carpets are said to have originated from the oases and villages of Central Asia. The carpet weaving became a gift of these trading caravans to Kashmir. Kashmir produces several varieties of handmade, handknotted floor coverings such as carpets and rugs. Another widely used way to produce carpets was and is by the felting of wool.

=== Namda ===
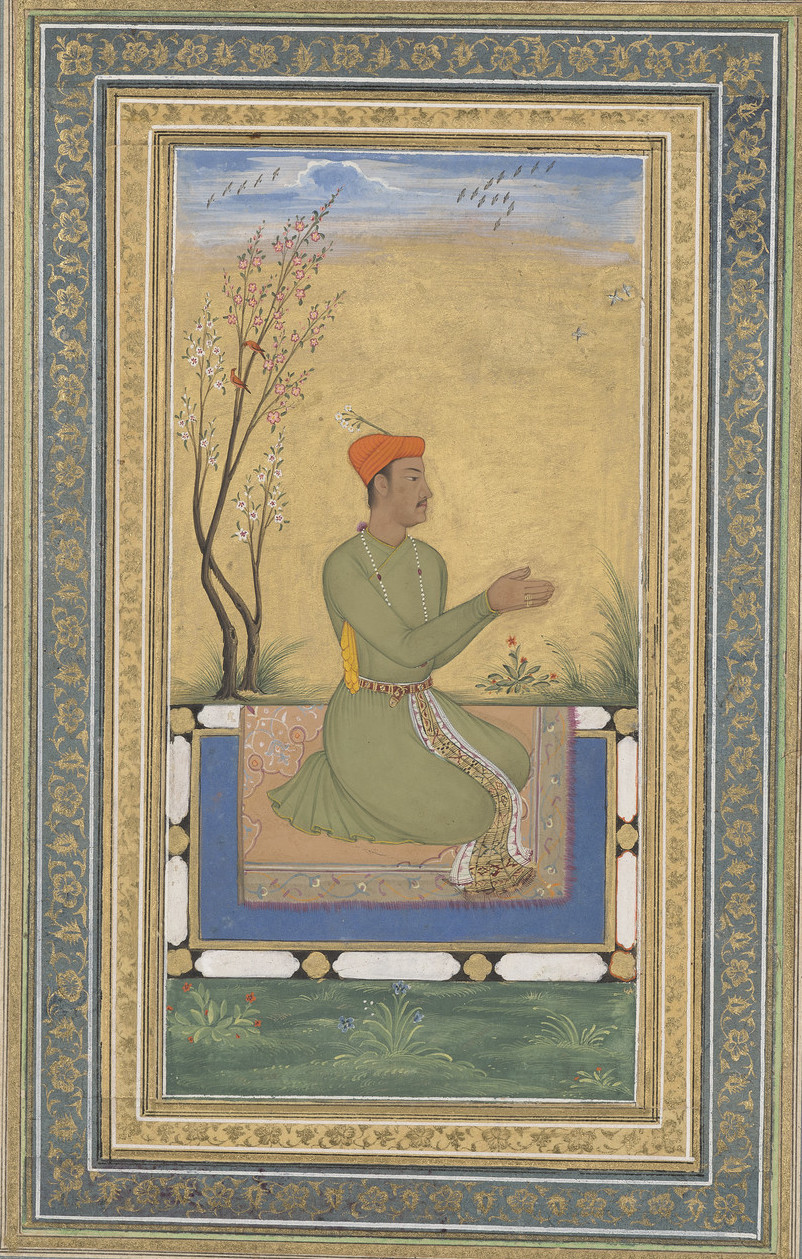
Portrait of Mughal prince Sultan Murad, depicted kneeling on a felt namda rug (ca 1600)

Namda is a traditional Kashmiri carpet produced by felting wool instead of weaving woollen threads. Wool that comes directly from the fleece of living sheep, is being sorted out, cleaned, dyed and then many layers are mingled together, soaped and felted. Later, the rug is decorated with chain stitch Aari embroidery with contrasting dyed threads. Or decoreated with pieces of feIt.

Nomadic farming tribes of the Central Asian steppes and mountains knew the technique of felting already in the late Iron Age and felted carpets are still part of the culture of countries such as Kirgyzstan, Kazakhstan, Uzbekistan, Mongolia, parts of Pakistan, and Turkey. In India, the namda became popular during the time of the Mughal emperor Akbar (1556–1605). It is said that he was so much impressed by a namda given as a present to shield his horse from the cold, that the emperor granted the namda-maker, Nubi large swathes of land.

The Ministry of Skill Development and Entrepreneurship is promoting the craft, expecting to benefit over 2,000 artisans of the 30 namda clusters from Kashmir.

=== Qaleen ===
Qaleen (Kaleen, Kalin, قالین) is a type of hand knotted piled carpet. It is a product of Kashmiri handicraft, these are handknotted intricately designed piled carpets made with wool or silk. Sultan Zain-ul-Abidin introduced "Kal baffi" craft (hand knotted carpets) from Persia to Kashmir in 15th century. Sultan brought carpet weavers from Persia and Central Asia in to Kashmir to train the local inhabitants.

=== Wagoo ===
Wagoo (also waguv or waggu) is a Kashmiri mat made of reeds. Wagoo was made by hand-knotting. Wagoo is a part of Kashmiri culture and heritage. Wagoo were regularly used in households in the Kashmir Valley.

Sultan Zain-ul-Abidin brought carpet weavers to Kashmir. Kal baff's used to weave wagoo and eventually it become famous in Kashmir in the 15th century.

== Embroidery work ==
Embroidery is an integral part of many Kashmiri handicrafts; shawls, carpets and phirans, Kashmiri women's dresses, are adorned with intricate embroideries or flowers made with thin metal threads known as 'Tille' in Kashmiri language. Embroidery work is done by both men in women in the region conventionally.

== Copperware ==
Kashmiri copperware (locally known as Traam) is a traditional metal craft featuring intricate hand-engraving (Kandkari). Artisans craft traditional items like the Samovar (tea urn), Trami (banquet platter), and Tasht-Naari (handwash basin).

== Stone crafting ==
Kashmiri artisans are known for their work in wood carving, stonework, stone polishing, glass blowing, and willow work. François Bernier appreciated Kashmiri's craft when he wrote in 1663. Stone crafting in Kashmir is very old; exceptional examples of beautiful architect and sculptures were crafted. Few examples are grand structures of the temples at Martand, Avantipur, Pariharpur, Patan, etc.

== Role of Kashmiri handicrafts in economy ==
The handicraft industry remained an important key in the economic development of J&K and the industry has a great handout towards employment opportunities. Handmade products are exported all over India and other parts of the world. Kashmiri handicrafts eliminated financial crises among those people who are affected with the physical disabilities. After handicrafts gained foreign exposure with positive feedback, many youth made this, their profession. Kashmiri Handicrafts is the second largest and preferable industry after fruit in Kashmir Valley.

== See also ==
- Rafoogar
- Wagoo
