= Kashmiri Bazaar =

Traditional market in Lahore, Pakistan

Kashmiri Bazaar (Urdu: کشمیری بازار) is a traditional market located in Lahore, Pakistan. It is known for Kashmiri handicrafts, textiles, and traditional products. Locals and visitors buy shawls, rugs, and other textiles at the bazaar.
