= Rafoogar =

Darner who repair the damaged or torn clothes

A rafoogar (Rafu Gar, needle-worker, darner or a cloth mender, رفو گر) is an artisan similar to an embroiderer (who decorates the cloths), but the rafoogar has the skill to repair the damaged or torn clothes. The rafoogar makes the holes, cuts, and manufacturing damages almost invisible. In Kashmir, the term is more associated with shawl making where the weavers were called Sada-baf and the workman for repairing work called rafoogar.

== Rafoogiri ==
Rafoogiri (darning) is a traditional art; it consists of sewing, making the joints, looping, and repairing holes or worn areas in fabric using needles and thread (of base colors). The rafoogar is the person who mends torn clothing by matching the weave, making identical loops, creating rows of stitches, and sometimes by crossing and interweaving rows to compass a gap. There are various areas where this craft has been practiced for decades. For instance, the Bijnor district has been a hub of rafoogari.

=== Rafoogar baithak ===
Rafoogar baithak is an initiative in favor of the dying craft.

== See also ==
- Kashmiri handicrafts
- Darning
- Shawl
