= Wagoo =

Traditional art of the Kashmir Valley, India

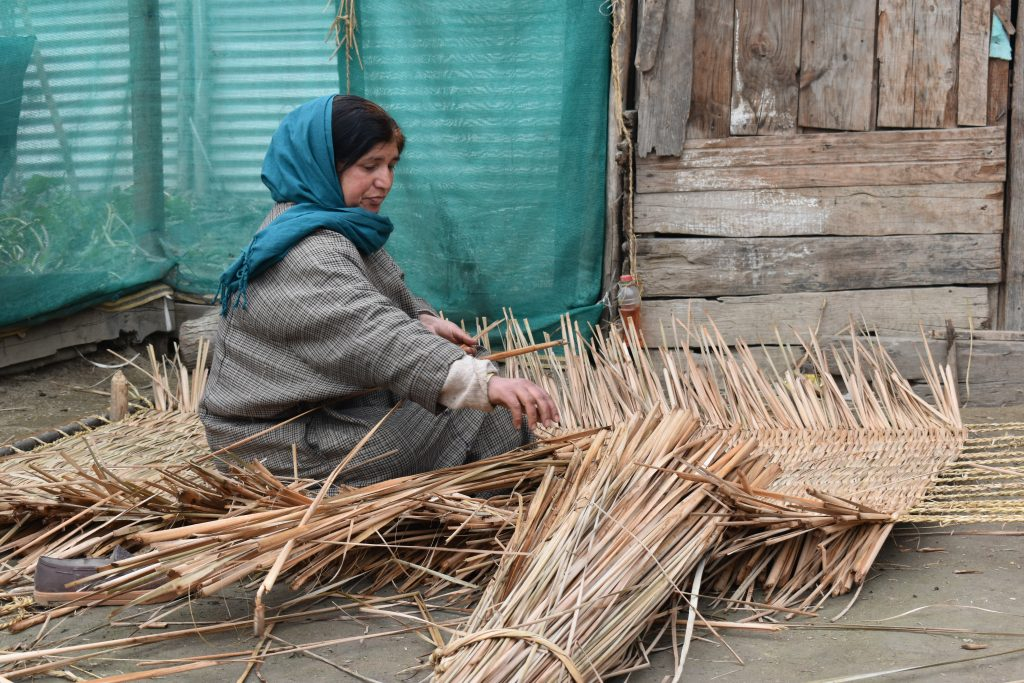
A Woman weaving Wagoo

Wagoo (lit. 'reed mat'), also spelled as waguv, and known by the variant name patig, is a Kashmiri traditional mat crafted from reed and rice straw, predominantly using Typha angustifolia, a grass commonly found near water bodies such as ponds, lakes, and drainage channels. Artisans who craft wagoo are referred to as "wagoo weavers". This practice is one of the oldest traditions of the Kashmir Valley and has been a part of its culture for nearly 300 years.

Wagoo serve as insulation during chillai kalan (winter) and as a cooling surface in summer. They are typically lightweight. The Typha angustifolia grass is harvested when it reaches a height of 4 to 6 feet and is woven into traditional structures. Being biodegradable, these mats are believed to contribute to health benefits, such as supporting low back pain and improving circulation. However, these claims are not supported by scientific evidence and thus remained uncertain.

== Design ==
The design of a waguv typically involves 2 to 3 artisans. The process begins by twisting long ropes, which are then used to interlock the reed, creating the mat's structure. This technique contributes to the functional mat preferable for traditional use. However, before twisting ropes, the grass stacks are thoroughly soaked to soften the material. This process makes the grass easier to twist and braid into ropes.

== Usage ==
Waguv, the traditional reed mat, was the primary flooring material in Kashmiri homes. People would first apply a layer of clay to their floors and then cover them with these mats. However, waguvs lose their quality when exposed to moisture, making them almost unusable.

== Decline ==
The decline in the use of waguv is largely attributed to the adoption of modern flooring and the growing preference for synthetic alternatives, which are viewed as more durable and contemporary. As a result, demand for waguv decreased significantly, leading many artisans to abandon the craft. In the modern-day, waguv is occasionally used by a small number of people in rural areas, primarily due to limited financial resources.

== In literature ==
Wagoo has been the subject of a book titled Floor Coverings from Kashmir: Kaleen Carpets, Namdah, Gabba, Ari Rugs, and Wagoo Mats by Promil Pande. The book traces its origin and cultural traditions. The book traces the origins of traditional carpets, including wagoo, linking them to the Indus Valley Civilization and continuing through to the 15th century during the reign of Zayn al-Abidin the Great. This historical narrative is similar to the one followed for pashmina shawls.

== Later development ==
In 2020, the government of Jammu and Kashmir launched Karkhandar Scheme to revive traditional crafts, including waguv, by merging the Department of Handicrafts and the Department of Handlooms into the Directorate of Handicrafts and Handlooms. As part of the scheme, the Waguv Karkhandar Centre was established to provide training and support for artisans. The initiative was focused on to preserve the craft and improve the socio-economic conditions of the artisans. However, the current status of the initiative remains uncertain.

== Books ==
- Pande, P. (2024). Floor Coverings from Kashmir: Kaleen Carpets, Namdah, Gabba, Ari Rugs and Wagoo Mats. Niyogi Books. ISBN 978-81-964053-4-2.
