= Kashmir walnut wood carving =

Wood carving work from Kashmir, India

Kashmir Walnut Wood Carving
- Geographical indication
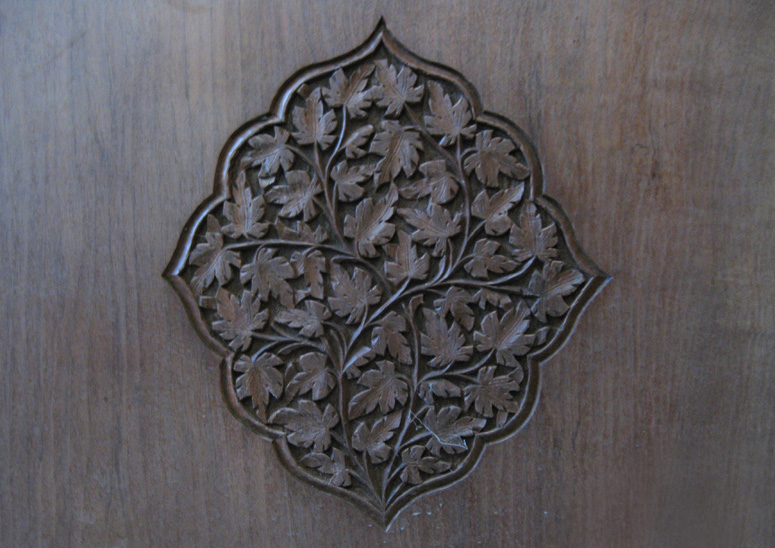
- Walnut wood carving
- Description: Walnut wood carving, Kashmir
- Type: Handicraft
- Area: Jammu and Kashmir
- Country: India
- Registered: 2007–2008
- Material: Wood

Kashmir walnut wood carving is wood carving work that is manufactured in Jammu and Kashmir, India. Walnut carving is protected under the geographical indication (GI) of the Agreement on Trade-Related Aspects of Intellectual Property Rights (TRIPS) agreement. It is listed at item 182 as "Kashmir Walnut Wood Carving" of the GI Act 1999 of the Government of India with registration confirmed by the Controller General of Patents Designs and Trademarks.

The Juglans regia tree that grows widely in Kashmir region is used for wood carving, and Kashmir is one of a few places for availability of walnut trees. Walnut wood is used to make tables, jewelry boxes, trays, etc.
