= Kashmir papier-mâché =

Type of handicraft from Kashmir

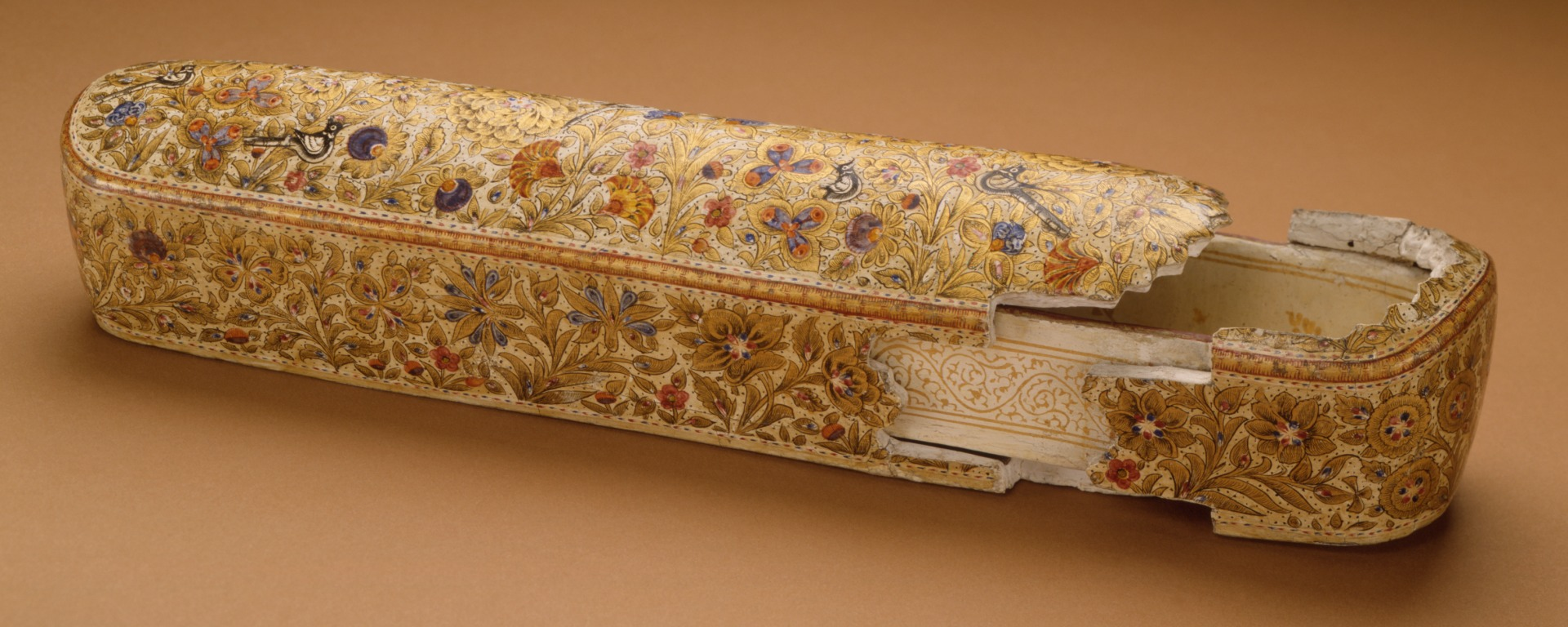
19th-century pen box made of papier-mâché, with paint and gold leaf.

Kashmiri papier-mâché is a Kashmiri handicraft brought to Kashmir from Persia by Muslim saint Mir Sayyid Ali Hamadani in the 14th century. It is based primarily on paper pulp and is a richly decorated, colourful artifact; generally in the form of vases, bowls, or cups (with and without metal rims), boxes, trays, lamp bases, and many other small objects. These are made in homes and workshops in Srinagar and other parts of the Kashmir Valley, and are marketed primarily within India, although there is a significant international market. The product is protected under the Geographic Indication Act 1999 of the Government of India and was registered by the Controller General of Patents, Designs and Trademarks in Financial Year 2011-12 as "Kashmir Paper Machie".

== Etymology ==
Papier-mâché is the French word for "chewed paper", which is a standard English loan word for objects made by moulding paper pulp in various shapes . Figuratively, the word 'papier-mâché' has come to be identified as the art of Kashmir.

== History ==
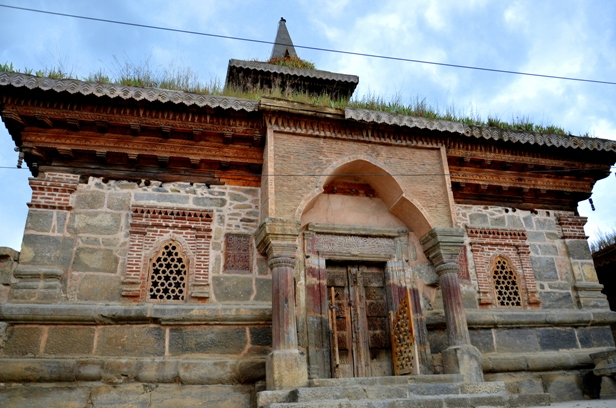
Papier-mâché art work on Madin Sahib Mosque

The papier-mâché technique of using paper pulp for making decorative objects was first brought to Kashmir in the 14th century by Mir Sayyid Ali Hamadani, a Sufi mystic, who arrived to Kashmir along with his followers, many of whom were craftsmen, Abdul Rahim a disiple of Hamadani a Artist from iran and start paper Mache in Kashmir. These craftsmen used hand-made paper pulp from Iran and Central Asia. The leader of the craftsmen, Mir Syed Ali Hamdani, was also instrumental in converting the people of Kashmir to Islam. These artists who were also well-versed in other handicrafts such as woodcarving, copper engraving and carpet weaving made Kashmir their permanent home. Another story posits that the art was brought to Kashmir in the 15th century by a local prince who had previously been imprisoned in Samarkand for many years.

Earlier to this period the practice was to draw colourful paintings on wood on household furniture such as ceilings, bedsteads, doors and windows, palanquins and so forth. Internally this art form was called, kar-i-qulamdan as it was made as pen holders and a few other personal trinkets. Another term used for the art was kar-i-munaqqash as it was crafted on smoothly finished surfaces created using paper pulp or on layers of polished paper. Even treated and stretched skin was used for the purpose. Starting with decorating jackets of books, the art covered many items of that period such as tables, table ware, bangles, lamp stands, cups, plaques, panels, screens and cabinets.

During the Mughal era, its use was extended to include many items of home furniture that were made in Kashmir. Many notable objects of this type are exhibited in museums in many parts of the world. The basic method followed was to apply the papier-mâché on wood work, and one such work can be seen in Kashmir at the Madin Sahib Mosque built in 1444, the ceiling of the Shah Hamdan Mosque and the Shalimar Garden, a Mughal garden in Srinagar. This tradition of using papier-mâché or pulp on wood work to be colourfully painted with different designs is very much in practice even today. Some of the older designs involved intricate painting of kingfishers, maple leaves and other designs, such as "Arabesque", "Yarkand" and "Hazara".

To encourage this art form to proliferate, the Government of Kashmir has included papier-mâché as a curriculum subject in schools.

== Manufacturing process ==
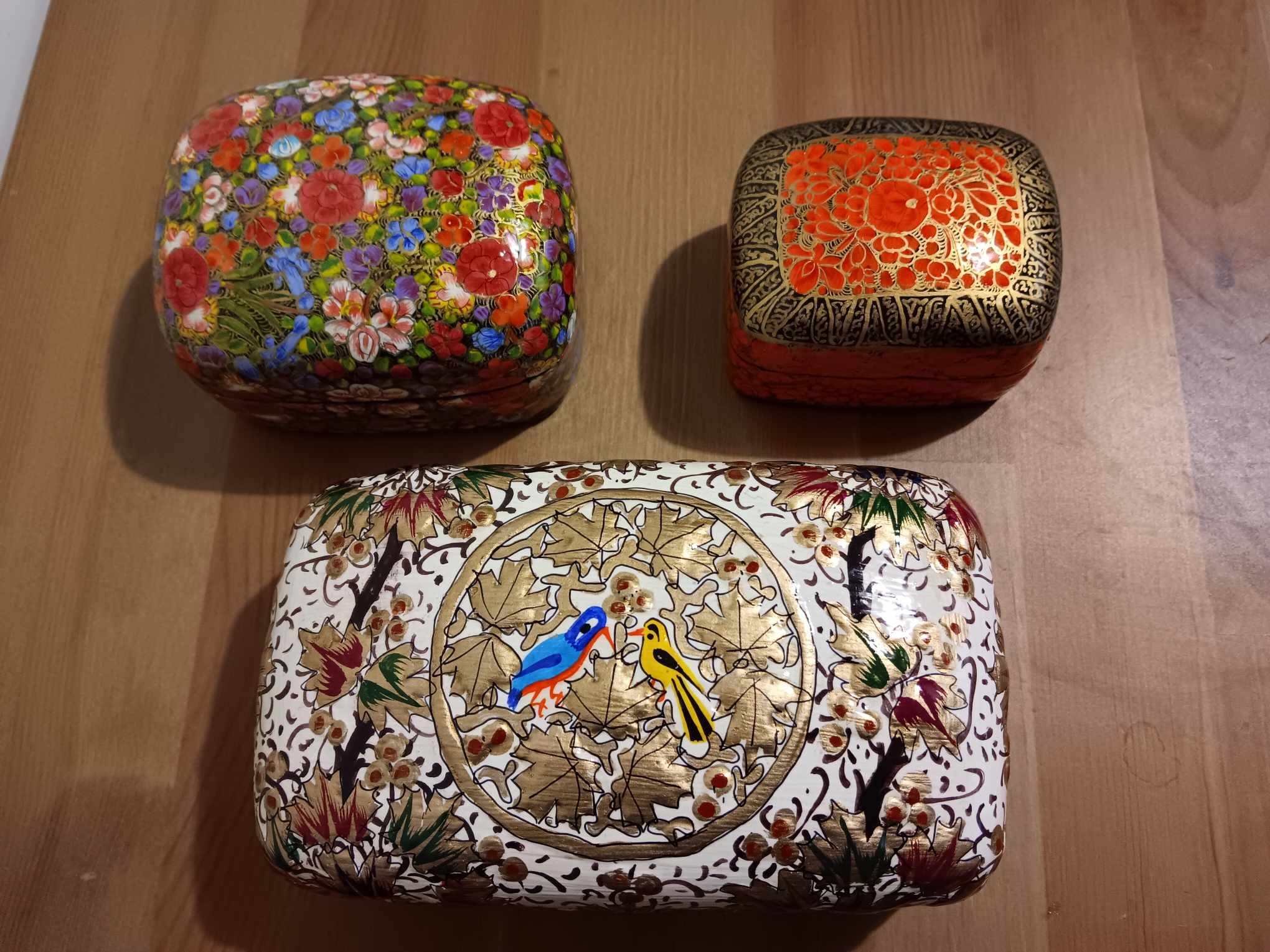
Kashmir papier-mâché trinket boxes

The skilled artisans involved with this painstaking process are called Paper Mache makers. The materials involved with this process are discarded paper, cloth, straw of rice plant, which are mixed and made into a pulp. The paper, after immersing in water for 4–5 weeks, is taken out and made into a pulp and dried. The dried paper is then converted to a powder. There is also a practice to mix the powdered paper with rice water to facilitate coagulation. The pulp thus made is applied on molds made in wood or brass. In earlier times, the mold was made of clay by the craftsman himself. It is also said that paper was just softened and not pulped and then applied in layers over the mold and drying it after covering each layer of pulp to get the desired shape. At the wet stage of application, the layers were covered with a muslin cloth and overlaid with another layer of material similar to plaster of Paris, locally known as gutchi.

The present practice is, however, to complete the layering of pulp over the mold at one stage itself and then dry it before polishing it with gemstones. The artwork is then detached from the mold using a saw and then rejoined using dense glue. The joint is then rubbed slowly with a file made of wood known locally as kathwa. The surface is polished till all irregularities and edges become smooth. Then gold and silver foils are used in combination with the paste of chalk and glue mixture, which is applied to the exterior and interior surfaces of the object using a brush. After drying of the treated object, the surfaces are again polished using baked brick pieces. To prevent any cracking more paper strips are pasted and then polished again to smooth the surface, to get the colour of zamin or earth or of gold, white, black, blue or red. The surface of the object is demarcated with yellow colour, which is then followed by floral designs made in different colours in dark or light shades with application of adhesive compound called dor made of zarda, sugar and glue as adhesive, and applying gold or silver foils.

The art object is then dried and given a varnish coat made of amber locally called kahruba or copal (sandirus) in a solution of methyl spirit. It is then sun dried. Following this process of drying the surface of the art object is cleaned thoroughly with a wet cloth. Then the surface of the artwork is again treated with a coat of silver and gold foils and then designs are created over the surface followed by a smoothing of the surface using gemstones such as jade (yashm). Then the art piece is again sun-dried and made ready for painting. Distemper colours made with pigments and glue are used to paint the artwork with various designs. The brushes used for the painting are made of hair of goat, cat or donkey. The practice was to use "craft mineral, organic and vegetable colours."

== Challenges ==
With new technologies and manufacturing techniques, the art of paper papier-mâché is becoming less common. The economic viability of the art, has taken a hit due to machine carving and artisans preferring other jobs. The art and its products most cater to the premier luxury sector with the price range on the upper side. Lower quality, cheaper machine products have challenged the sector, with artisans struggling to keep the sector going.
