= Fauna of Jammu and Kashmir =

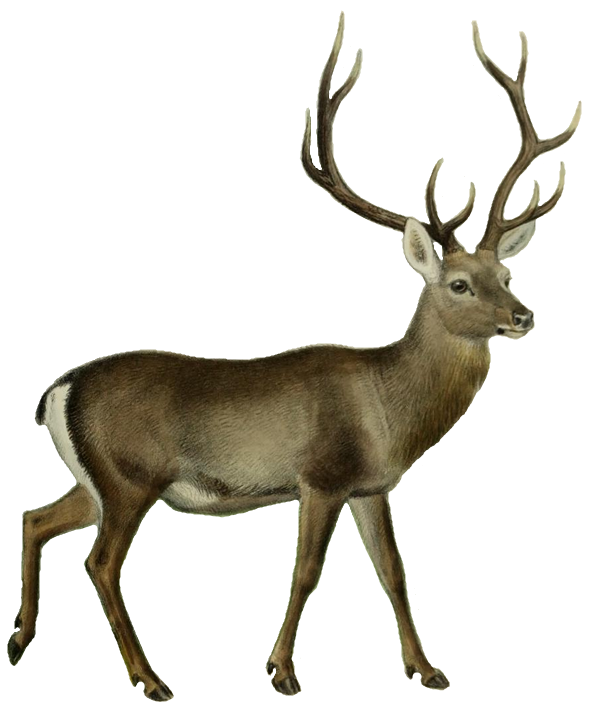
A lithograph of the Kashmiri Stag (Hangul) circa 1898.

The fauna of Jammu and Kashmir consist of all fauna living in the Indian union territory of Jammu and Kashmir. The largest group overall is the Arthropods, whereas the largest in vertebrates are the Birds.

== Biodiversity ==
The fauna of Jammu and Kashmir account for about 16% of all fauna in India. The majority are vertebrates with around 14% of the species in Jammu and Kashmir, whereas invertebrates are about 2%.

=== Vertebrates ===
There are 867 vertebrate species living in Jammu and Kashmir out of the 6122 species in all of India. Of these 867, 120 are fish, 17 are amphibians, 63 are reptiles, 555 are birds, and 112 are mammals. Fish make up about 14%, 2% are amphibians, 7% are reptiles, 64% are birds, and mammals make up 13%.

In Kashmir, there are seven breeds of sheep, five breeds of goat, three breeds of horse, two breeds of cattle, and one breed of camel. In his 1895 book The Valley of Kashmir, travelogue author Walter Roper Lawrence said that Kashmiri cattle were "small but hardy, and for their size they do a fair tail of work." He also says "they are rather bigger than Brittany cattle, have humps, and their prevailing color is black or grey."

=== Invertebrates ===
In Jammu and Kashmir, there are 1485 species of invertebrates, out of the 83,479 species in all of India. There 121 species of rotifers, 22 species of annelids, 1315 species of arthropods, and 27 species of mollusks. Additionally, rotifers make up 8% of the 1485 species of invertebrates, 1% are annelids, 89% are arthropods, and mollusks make up less than 2%.

== Conservation ==
In Jammu and Kashmir, there are 71 threatened species of fauna. Of these 71, 33 are birds, 26 are mammals, five reptiles or fish, and two amphibians.

Among the birds, three species are critically endangered, four are endangered, 11 are listed as vulnerable, and 15 are near threatened. Among the mammals, one species is critically endangered, five are endangered, eight are vulnerable, and 12 are near threatened. The threatened herpetofauna of Jammu and Kashmir include five reptilians (two are endangered, two are vulnerable, and one is near threatened) and two amphibians (one is endangered, one is near threatened). Three species of fish are considered threatened (one is critically endangered, one is endangered, and the last one is vulnerable), with the final two assessed as near threatened.

The total number of near threatened faunal species is 30.

== Sources ==
1. The Valley Of Kashmir
2. Biodiversity of the Himalaya: Jammu and Kashmir State
  1. Table 1.1
  2. Figure 38.1
3. (PDF) Livestock and poultry breeds of Jammu and Kashmir and Ladakh
4. Flora and Fauna of Jammu and Kashmir
