= Kashmiriyat =

Kashmiri cultural tradition of the Kashmir Valley

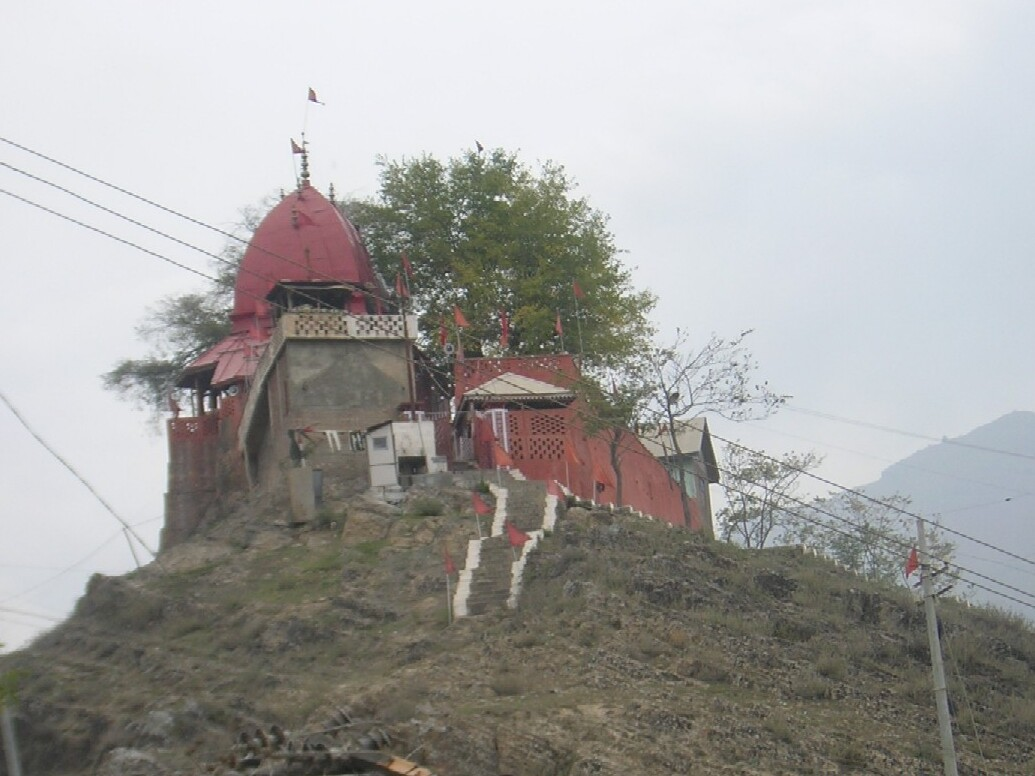
The Jwala Mukhi Mandir in Khrew, located in the Kashmir Valley, hosts the annual Jwalamukhi Mela attended by both Kashmiri Hindus and Kashmiri Muslims.

Kashmiriyat (also spelled Kashmiriat) is a traditional cultural and social ethos associated primarily with the Kashmir Valley, centred around shared linguistic, cultural and religious traditions among Kashmiri-speaking people, which live in the Indian-administered Kashmir.

The term is commonly used to describe the centuries-old tradition of communal coexistence, religious syncretism, and cultural harmony between Kashmiri Pandits, Kashmiri Muslims, and other communities native to the Kashmir Valley.

Although the word Kashmir is also used geopolitically for the wider disputed region formerly comprising the princely state of Jammu and Kashmir, the concept of Kashmiriyat historically developed within the Kashmir Valley and is not generally considered representative of the diverse cultures of regions such as Jammu, Ladakh, Gilgit-Baltistan and Poonch Jagir region.

== Scope and definition ==
The term Kashmiriyat is frequently misunderstood due to the dual usage of the term Kashmir:

1. The Kashmir Valley — the Kashmiri-speaking valley region centred around Srinagar.
2. The wider Kashmir dispute region — including Jammu, Chenab Valley, Pir Panjal Region, Ladakh, and Gilgit Baltistan.

Historically and culturally, Kashmiriyat refers mainly to the shared identity and traditions of the people of the Kashmir Valley rather than the entire disputed territory.

The regions outside the Valley generally possess distinct ethnic, linguistic and cultural identities:

- Duggar region of Jammu division is associated primarily with Dogra culture.
- Chenab Valley is a subregion in Jammu division of Jammu & Kashmir, India, which is ethno-linguistically diverse with regional similarities to Kashmir Valley and Western Pahari regions of Jammu and Himachal Pradesh.
- Ladakh has strong Tibetan Buddhist and Shia Muslim influences.
- Gilgit-Baltistan is ethnically and linguistically diverse with Dardic, Tibetan and Burusho populations.
- Neelum Valley is a subregion of Muzaffarabad division of Azad Jammu and Kashmir, Pakistan, which is ethno-linguistically similar to the Kashmir Valley.
- Pir Panjal Region, including Muzaffarabad, is culturally closer to the Pahari and Pothohari regions than to the Kashmir Valley. Despite primarily being non-Kashmiri speaking, residents of this region have a strong sense of Kashmiri nationalism especially in Azad Kashmir.

Consequently, many scholars restrict the usage of Kashmiriyat specifically to the Valley’s cultural sphere.

== Origins ==
The origins of Kashmiriyat are linked to the historical interaction of Hinduism, Buddhism, and Islam in the Kashmir Valley. The concept is often associated with the influence of Kashmir Shaivism, Sufism, and the Rishi-Sufi tradition.

The Kashmiri Sultan Zain-ul-Abidin is frequently credited with promoting intercommunal harmony in the Valley during the 15th century.

The mystic poet Lal Ded is regarded as one of the principal symbols of Kashmiriyat. Revered by both Hindus and Muslims, she represents the syncretic traditions of the Valley.

== Characteristics ==
Kashmiriyat is characterised by:

- Shared use of the Kashmiri language
- Joint participation in cultural and religious festivals
- Influence of Sufi and Rishi traditions
- Shared cuisine, dress and folklore
- Emphasis on coexistence and communal harmony

The concept has often been described as a form of cultural rather than political identity.

== Notable examples ==
Muslims, Hindus and Sikhs in the Kashmir Valley have historically celebrated Sufi shrine festivals together.

Kashmiri Muslim carpet weavers have traditionally produced carpets featuring Hindu iconography such as Durga, Lakshmi and Saraswati.

The annual Jwalamukhi fair at Khrew is attended by both Kashmiri Hindus and Kashmiri Muslims.

== Political usage ==
In modern political discourse, the term Kashmiriyat has sometimes been expanded beyond its original cultural meaning and used in relation to the broader Kashmir conflict. Some political groups interpret it as a symbol of regional nationalism or a distinct Kashmiri political identity.

However, several scholars have argued that the concept has occasionally been romanticised and applied too broadly to the entire former princely state despite major regional differences.

== Criticism ==
Scholar Christopher Snedden argues that the idea of Kashmiriyat has been idealised in political and intellectual discourse and did not fully prevent communal tensions between Kashmiri Pandits and Kashmiri Muslims.

Critics also note that applying the term to the entire disputed Kashmir region ignores the distinct identities of non-Valley populations such as Dogras, Ladakhis, Baltis and Paharis.

== Modern challenges ==
The rise of the Insurgency in Jammu and Kashmir from 1989 onwards and the subsequent exodus of Kashmiri Hindus significantly weakened the traditional social fabric associated with Kashmiriyat.

Nevertheless, cultural organisations, writers and social activists continue to promote the concept as part of the Valley’s cultural heritage.

== See also ==
- Composite nationalism
- Ganga-Jamuni tehzeeb
- Punjabiyat
- Hindu–Muslim unity
- Kashmir Valley
