= Dogras =

Indo-Aryan ethnic group in South Asia

Total population
- 2.5 million (2011)

Regions with significant populations
- Majority: Jammu; Minority: Punjab, Himachal Pradesh, Delhi, Haryana

Languages
- Dogri

Religion
- Predominantly: Hinduism; Minority: Islam and Sikhism

Related ethnic groups
- Punjabis, Kangris and other Indo-Aryans

The Dogras, or Dogra people, are an Indo-Aryan ethno-linguistic group living primarily in the Indian union territory of Jammu and Kashmir. They speak their native Dogri language. They live predominantly in the Duggar region of the Jammu Division of Jammu and Kashmir, and in adjoining areas of the states of Punjab and Himachal Pradesh. Some also live in northeastern Pakistan.

Dogra Rajputs of the Jamwal clan ruled Jammu from the 19th century, when Gulab Singh was made a hereditary Raja of Jammu by Ranjit Singh, while his brother Dhian Singh was the Sikh Empire's prime minister of Punjab, until September 1843. Through the Treaty of Amritsar (1846), they acquired Kashmir as well. The Dogra Regiment of the Indian Army primarily consists of Dogras from the Himachal Pradesh, Punjab and Jammu region.

== Etymology ==
The term Dogra is thought to derive from Durgara, the name of a kingdom mentioned in an eleventh century copper-plate inscription in Chamba. The inscription mentions the Raja of Chamba facing an attack by Kiras aided by the Lord of Durgara (durgāreśwara). In medieval times the term Durgara is believed to have turned into Duggar, eventually transforming to 'Dogra'. Kalhana's Rajatarangini makes no mention of a kingdom by any of these names, but the kingdoms could have been referred to by their capital cities (such as Vallapura, modern Billawar, or Babbapura, modern Babor). In modern times, the term Dogra has become an ethnic identity, referring to all who speak the Dogri language, irrespective of their religion.

== History ==
Omachanda Handa believes that the Durgara people were originally migrants from Rajasthan. The allusion to durg (fort) in their name indicates that they may have remained a warrior people, eventually founding powerful kingdoms between Chenab and Ravi, and possibly dominating up to the Sutluj river.

According to archaeologist M. A. Stein, there were some eleven Dogra states in the region, all of them eventually absorbed into the Jammu state, which emerged as the most powerful. Prior to the rise of Jammu, Babbapura (Babor) is believed to have been the chief state of Dogras. Lying 45 km east of Jammu, Babor contains the ruins of six magnificent temples representing a "thriving artistic activity". The Rajatarangini mentions Raja Vajradhara of Babbapura vowing allegiance to Bhikshachara of Kashmir in 1120 AD, along with the chiefs of neighbouring kingdoms.

=== Jammu Dogras ===
The Jammu Dogras traditionally inhabited the area between the slopes of the Shivalik range of mountains and the sacred Surinsar Lake and Mansar Lake, but later spread over whole of the Jammu region. Many of the dogras immigrated from the state of Punjab, specifically from Sialkot region. They generally speak Dogri and other dialects similar to Dogri or western Pahadi-influenced languages. The majority of the Dogra are followers of Hinduism, but many in Jammu and Kashmir believe in other religions. In the sixteenth and seventeenth centuries, some Dogras embraced Islam and Sikhism. These factors, together with the effects of immigration into the region, have resulted in the Dogra population of Jammu and Kashmir including members of all three religions.

The Dogra dynasty emerged as a regional power, particularly after Rajput Maharaja Gulab Singh emerged as a warrior and his subjects received special martial recognition from the British Raj. The rule of Gulab Singh's Raj extended over the whole of the Jammu region, a large part of the Ladakh region as early as March 1846, and a large part of the Indian Punjab (now Himachal Pradesh). The Kashmir Valley was handed over to Gulab Singh by the British government, as part of the territories ceded to the British government by Lahore State according to the provisions of Article IV of the Treaty of Lahore dated 9 March 1846. Under the Treaty of Amritsar in the same year, the Dogra king of Jammu and the state was thereafter known as the Maharaja of Jammu and Kashmir State (Raj), also thereafter referred as Kashmir State. The term Dogra hence is more akin to the subjects of Himachal Pradesh, some areas of Punjab and the whole region of Jammu that was ruled by Raja Gulab Singh as part of the Dogra Raj irrespective of the religion of the inhabitants.

=== Jammu and Kashmir ===
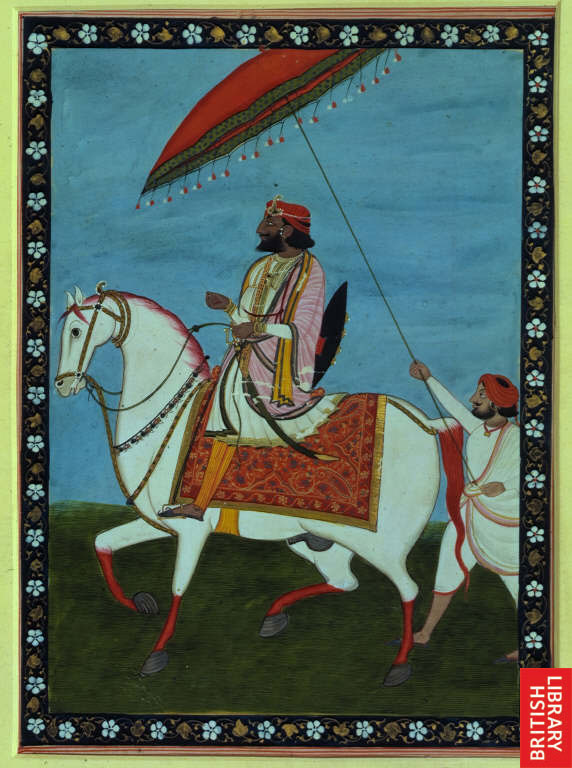
Gulab Singh, the first Maharaja of Dogra Rajput dynasty which ruled Jammu and Kashmir.

The Dogra dynasty was a dynasty of Hindu Rajputs who ruled Jammu and Kashmir from 1846 to 1947.

The Sikh Empire rule extended beyond the Jammu region and the Kashmir Valley to the Tibetan Buddhist Kingdom of Ladakh and the Emirates of Hunza, Gilgit and Nagar. After the First Anglo-Sikh War in 1846, the British gave Kashmir and the title of 'Maharaja' to Gulab Singh.

=== Military history ===
The Dogra Regiment was among the regiments of the British Indian Army, which made significant contributions in both the world wars on all fronts from East Asia to Europe and North Africa. At Independence, it became an infantry regiment of the Indian Army composed largely but not exclusively of the Dogra people. The Jammu and Kashmir Rifles, another regiment of the Indian Army, consisting of mainly Dogras was formed out of the former army of the Kingdom of Jammu & Kashmir after it was absorbed into the Indian Army. Prior to India's partition, the erstwhile 10th Baluch Regiment of the British Indian Army had had a company of Dogra Brahmins, which fought with great distinction in the Burma campaign. Post independence, the company was drafted to the 17th Dogra Regiment.

== Notable people ==
- Banda Singh Bahadur, Sikh warrior and commander of Khalsa army
- Premchand Degra, Professional bodybuilder
- Akshay Dogra, Indian actor
- Girdhari Lal Dogra, Politician who served as Finance minister of Jammu and Kashmir
- Monica Dogra, American musician and actress
- Paras Dogra, Indian cricketer
- Prem Nath Dogra, Politician also known as Sher e Duggar
- Rajiv Dogra, Indian diplomat who served as Ambassador to Romania
- Riddhi Dogra, Indian actress
- Romesh Chander Dogra, Deputy speaker and former Health and Family Welfare minister of Punjab
- Tirath Das Dogra, Indian forensic pathologist
- Zakir Hussain, Indian tabla player and composer
- Vidyut Jammwal, Indian actor and martial artist
- Mian Dido Jamwal, dogra warrior who revolted against Sikh Empire
- Ranveer Jamwal, Indian mountaineer and army officer
- Ajay Singh Jasrotia, Indian military officer and martyr of Kargil war
- Arun Singh Jasrotia, Indian military officer was posthumously awarded the Ashoka Chakra
- Khudadad Khan, British Indian soldier and recipient of Victoria Cross
- Vijay Mahajan (academic), Jammu-born Indian-American Professor of Marketing (The University of Texas at Austin) and former Dean, Indian School of Business
- Manjit Minhas, Canadian entrepreneur, television personality and venture capitalist.
- Rashid Minhas, Pilot in Pakistan Air Force and recipient of Nishan-e-Haider
- Anant Singh Pathania, Indian military personnel and first Indian recipient of Military Cross in the Second World War
- Raghbir Singh Pathania, former Indian Lieutenant Colonel
- Alla Rakha, Hindustani classical musician from India
- Mukesh Rishi, Indian actor and film producer
- Gurbachan Singh Salaria, Indian military officer and member of UN peacekeeping
- Narain Singh Sambyal, Military personnel
- Shivkumar Sharma, Indian classical musician and santoor player
- Dhian Singh, longest serving wazir of Sikh Empire and aristocrat
- Gulab Singh, first Maharaja of the princely state of Jammu and Kashmir
- Hari Singh, former Maharaja of the princely state of Jammu and Kashmir
- Karan Singh, titular Maharaja of the princely state of Jammu and Kashmir and former Rajya sabha member
- Rajinder Singh, officer in the Jammu and Kashmir State Forces also known as saviour of Kashmir
- Maharaja Ranbir Singh, former Maharaja of the princely state of Jammu and Kashmir
- Zorawar Singh, military general of first Sikh Empire and later Dogra dynasty

== Culture ==
=== Folk dance and music ===
- Kud, a ritual dance performed in honour of Lok Devatas. This dance style is performed mostly at night. It is spontaneous and people of all ages and genders participate. Instruments used during the Kud are narshingha, chhaina, flute, and drums. The rhythm of music controls the movement of participants. This dance continues all night. The number of participants ranges from 20 to 30.
- Heren, a traditional theatre form performed during the Lohri festival by 10–15 people. It is mostly performed in the hills of Jammu, Udhampur and ramnagar.
- Fumenie and Jagarana, a dance style performed by women on the eve of a groom's departure to in-laws house. Both songs are sung by a group of 15–20 members. This traditional dance form depicts the feelings and emotions of women.
- Paakh/Gwatri/Kark/Masade, a chorus narrative sung by a group of 10 singers without any musical instruments.
- Gwatri, a song–dance combined tradition in which the singers narrate some text which is acted by the Gwatari dancers.
- Karak, a narrative ballet sung by a community called 'Jogies'. They narrate a popular folk tale in their dance style, performed by three members to the accompaniment of a folk instrument called a rubab.
- Benthe, a chorus singing tradition performed by a specific community of tribal people called Gujjar and Bakerwal. The dance is performed by 5–7 members.

=== Cuisine ===
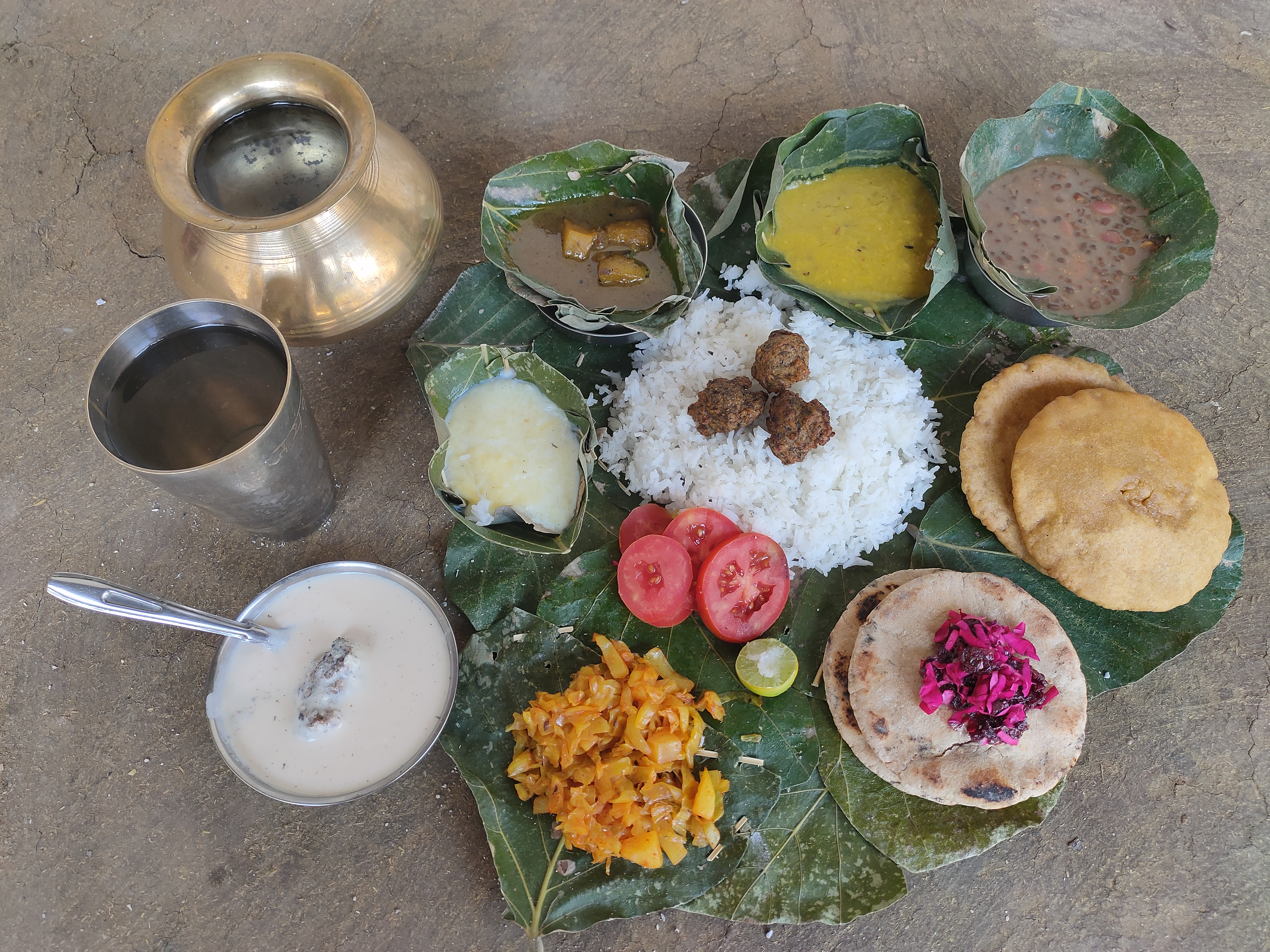
Traditional dogra food of Jammu and Kashmir

Wheat, maize and bajra are staple foods, in addition to rice, cereals and a tangy preparation of mango or tamarind popularly known as ambal (अम्बल) or maani (म्हाणी)/ambal (अंबल). The dish is called dal patt maani (दाल भत्त म्हाणी) and is savoured as a combination. Mittha madra (मिट्ठा मदरा) is a favourite and is made with milk, dry fruit, and semolina.

Especially in ceremonial cooking, the following are favourites:

- preparations of rajmash (a special variety of red kidney beans);
- mash da madra (yogurt-based gravy for black lentils);
- auryia, a curd dish fermented by rye;
- kulth di daal (horse gram);
- ambal made from pumpkin, jaggery and tamarind.

In Dogra Dhaam (community feasts and banquets), cooking is specially supervised by expert family chefs belonging to Dogra Brahmin community and are known as Siyans. They are assisted by Dogra jheers in cooking. Kalari is milk preserved by the coagulation of proteins, then fried in a pan.

Non-vegetarian food was limited to Rajputs and Vaish (Mahajans). Khatta meat is mutton cooked with sour pomegranate seeds (anardana) or lime juice and flavoured with fumes of a burning charcoal soaked in mustard oil. Keyur (घ्यूर) is a well-known Dogra food. It is prepared by frying flour or maida batter, and served with sugar and curd. Mostly, it is served to bridegrooms at the time of marriage by his in-laws. Kalari is a favourite food of Dogras in the rainy season. It is prepared by mixing flour, cottage cheese and milk cream (malai) with water with help of a small cup-shaped pot. Kalari is served with milk. Kalari cheese is popular in the Jammu region and in Jammu and Kashmir state more generally. Babbru/pathoru are prepared with flour and fried in oil. Babbru is served with maani/potato dish/kheer/curd etc.

Kheer is a dish prepared from milk by adding rice and dry fruit. It is served at all special occasions and festivals. Another popular exotic dish is guchiyyan (dried black morel), usually added as an ingredient in pulao. As it grows naturally in forests and cannot be cultivated, it is a priced commodity (approx 500 Rs. per 100 g) and makes an excelled dish with mountain potatoes (pahadi aloo). Saffron or kesar is extensively used to flavour sweet dishes and for its anti-oxidant benefits. Many types of pickles are prepared with Kasrod (fiddlehead fern), mango, tyaoo, lasoode and girgle.

== Bibliography ==
- Hāṇḍā, Omacanda (1998), Textiles, Costumes, and Ornaments of the Western Himalaya, Indus Publishing, ISBN 978-81-7387-076-7
- Charak, Sukh Dev Singh; Billawaria, Anita K. (1998), Pahāṛi Styles of Indian Murals, Abhinav Publications, ISBN 978-8-17017-356-4
- Stein, M. A. (1900), Kalhana's Rajatarangini: A chronicle of the kings of Kasmir, Volume 1, Westminster: Archibald Constable and Co., ISBN 978-81-208-0370-1
