= Jwala Devi Temple =

Jwala Devi Temple, and variations, may refer to:

- Jwala Ji Temple (Kashmir)
- Jwala Devi Temple (Uttar Pradesh)
