= Jwala (goddess) =

Hindu Goddess

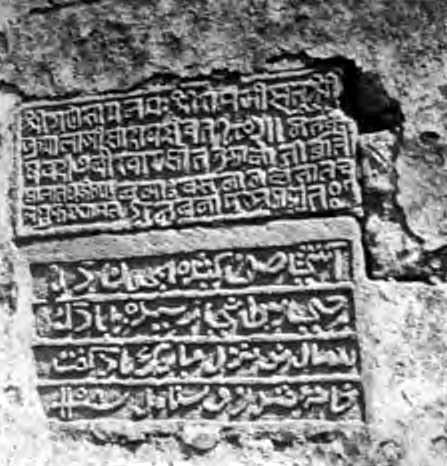
Sanskrit (above) and Persian (below) inscriptions from the Ateshgah (fire temple) of Baku, Azerbaijan. The Sanskrit inscription is a religious Hindu invocation in old Devanagari script while the Persian inscription is a couplet. The Sanskrit invocation begins with: I salute Ganesha (श्री गणेशाय नमः), a standard beginning of most Hindu prayers. The second line venerates the holy fire Jwala Ji (जवालाजी). The inscription is dated to Vikram Samvat 1802 (संवत १८०२, i.e. 1745 CE). Unlike the several Sanskrit (written in Devanagari) and Punjabi (written in Gurmukhi) inscriptions in the temple, the Persian quatrain below is the sole Persian one and, though ungrammatical, also refers to the fire and dates it to Lunar Hijri 1158 (١١٥٨, i.e. again 1745 CE).

Jwala (Pahari: जवाला जी, Punjabi: ਜਵਾਲਾ ਜੀ, Hindi: ज्वाला जी) is a Hindu goddess. The physical manifestation of Jwala is typically a set of eternal flames.

The Hindu temple Jwala/jawala(flame) or Jwala Mukhi (a person with a face glowing like fire) is mentioned in the Mahabharata and other religious scriptures. There is a natural cave where flames continue to burn due to natural gas deposits found underground seeping out from the rocks and ignited by an unknown source. Several schools of Buddhism also share the symbolism of a seven-forked sacred flame.

== Theology ==
According to Hindu legend, in ancient times when demons lorded over the Himalaya mountains and harassed the gods, Vishnu led the gods to destroy the demons. They focused their strengths and caused huge flames to rise from the ground. From that fire, a young girl was born. She is regarded as Adishakti -- the first 'Shakti.'

Known as Sati, the girl grew up in Prajapati Daksha's house and later became Shiva's consort. When her father insulted Shiva, she could not accept this and killed herself. When Shiva heard of his wife's death he was enraged. While holding Sati's body, he began stalking the three worlds. The other gods trembled before his wrath and appealed to Vishnu for help. Vishnu released a Sudarshan chakra that struck Sati's body and broke it. At the places where the pieces fell, the fifty-one sacred 'Shaktipeeths' came into being.

Centuries ago, a cowherd found out that one of his cows never produced milk. He followed the cow to investigate the cause. He saw a girl coming out of the forest who drank the cow's milk, then disappeared in a flash of light. The cowherd went to the king and told him the story. The king knew the legend recounting that Sati's tongue had fallen in this area. The king tried without success to find that sacred spot. Some years later, the cowherd returned to the king to report that he had seen a flame burning in the mountains. The king found the spot and had a darshan (vision) of the holy flame. He ordered for a temple to be built there by Raja Bhumi Chand and arranged for priests to engage in regular worship.

Jawalamukhi has been a pilgrimage centre for many years. According to legend, the Mughal Emperor Akbar visited the pilgrimage site and attempted to extinguish the eternal flames using an iron disk and diverting water, but the flames resisted all efforts. Akbar, initially skeptical of the deity's power, presented a golden parasol (chattar) at the shrine, where it transformed into an unknown metal. This incident deepened his belief. The shrine continues to attract thousands of pilgrims seeking spiritual fulfillment throughout the year.

== Map of Jwala temples ==
Jwala temples

== Jwala Temples ==
=== Jwala of Kashmir ===
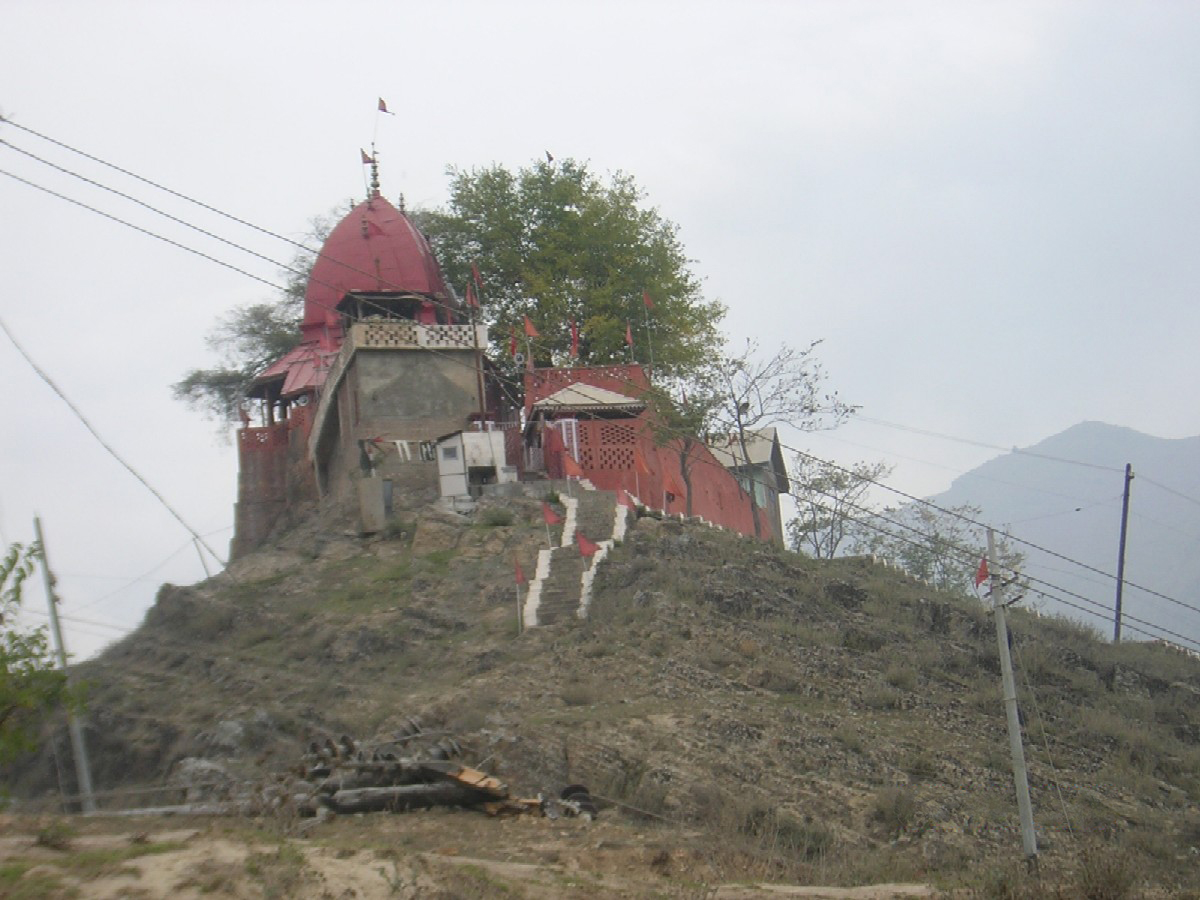
Jwala Mukhi Mandir in Khrew, Jammu and Kashmir, India

Jwalamukhi Temple is a Kashmiri Hindu mandir (temple) located in Khrew. On 16 July, the Jwalamukhi Fair is hosted annually and is celebrated by both Hindus and Muslims (cf. Kashmiriyat).

=== Jwala Kangra ===
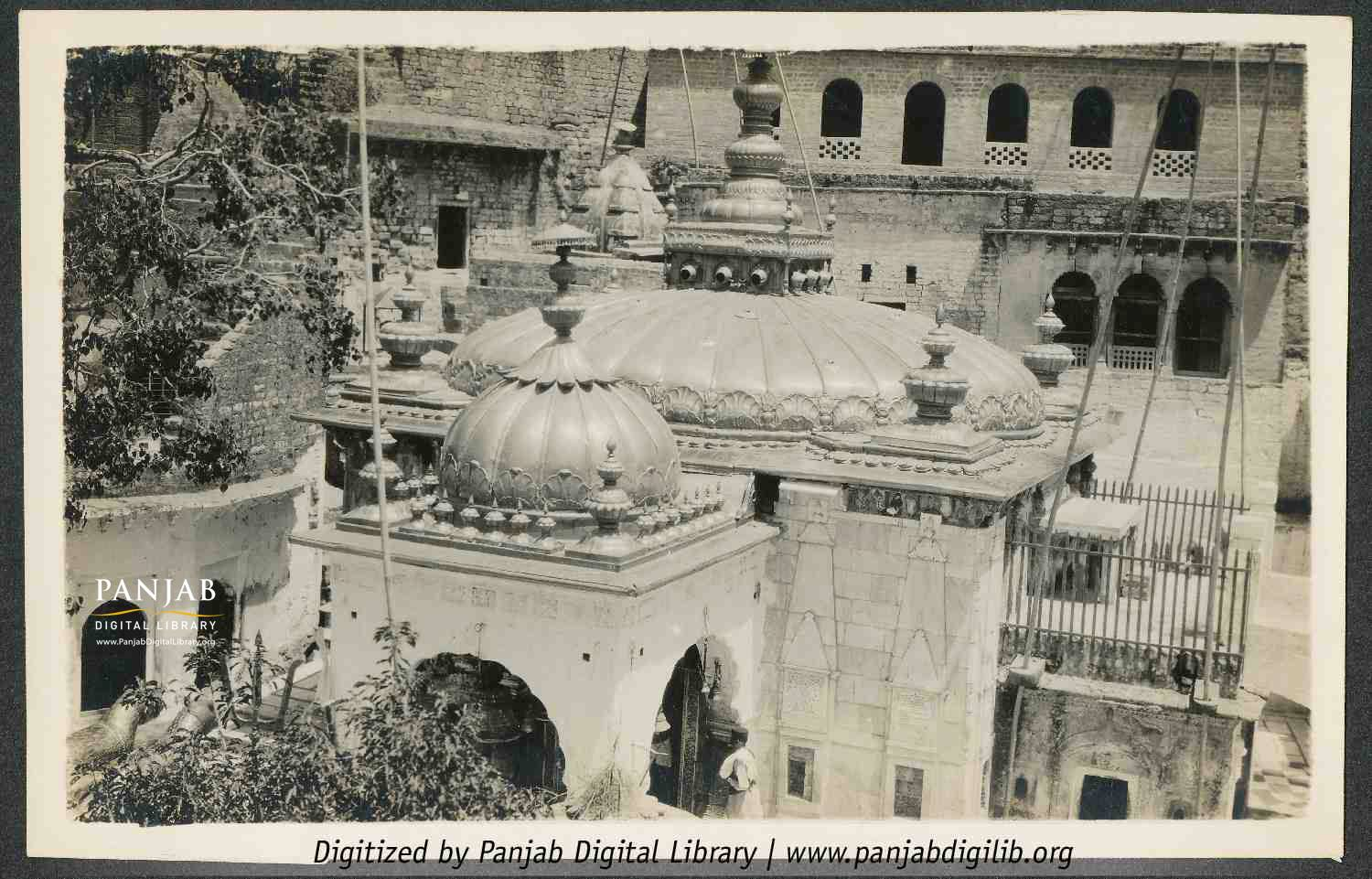
Photograph of the Jwala temple in Kangra district, taken by Dhanna Singh Chahal 'Patialvi', 1933

The most well-known Jwala shrine is located in the town of Jawalamukhi, in the lower Himalayan area of the Kangra district, in the state of Himachal Pradesh of India. The shrine is 56 kilometres (35 mi) from the larger town of Dharamshala. The temple style is similar to other Jwala shrines with four corners, a small dome on the top and a square central pit of hollowed stone inside where the main flame burns continuously. A fair is held in the environs of the temple annually in July or August, during Navratras. The temple previously had a library of associated ancient Hindu texts, many of which were translated from Sanskrit into Persian at the orders of Firuz Shah Tughlaq when the Delhi Sultanate overran the Kangra area.

According to legend, when Sati's body was divided into 51 parts, her tongue fell in the area of Jawalamukhi, where it continues to be represented by the flames. Along with her tongue, the flames of Sati's yogic power also fell nearby. Some legends state that Sati's clothes also fell there. Near this area, eternal flames continue to burn in a natural cave.

=== Jwala Devi of Shaktinagar ===
Jwala Devi Temple is located in Shaktinagar township of Sonbhadra district, Uttar Pradesh. It is an ancient Ashtagrih temple of Jwala Devi and one of the 51 Shaktipeethas of India. The temple is believed to be 1000 years old and constructed by Raja Udit Narayan Singh of Gaharwal. This is where the tongue of Parvati is worshipped. The idol of the main deity is located in the Sanctum Sanatorium (central place of the temple). The black stone idol in the temple has been installed with other deities surrounding the main idol. This Jwala Devi Temple is believed to have been blessed with the presence of Shakti due to the falling of the front tongue of Sati while Shiva carried her and wandered through Āryāvarta in sorrow. Visitors offer gold/silver tongues as offerings after their wishes are fulfilled.

=== Jwala Mai of Muktinath ===
The flame at the Jwala shrine in the village of Muktinath is located at an altitude of 3,710 meters at the foot of the Thorong La mountain pass in the Mustang district of Nepal. A small amount of natural gas is present in the Himalayan spring that emerges near the shrine, giving it the appearance of fire burning on the water itself. This shrine is usually called the Jwala Mai (Jwala Mother) temple, and is sacred to both Hindus and Buddhists.

=== Atashgah of Baku ===
The Baku Atashgah is a temple in Surakhani, a suburb of Baku in Azerbaijan. Historically, some Hindu pilgrims have referred to it as the Baku Jwala. Given that fire is considered highly sacred in both Hinduism and Zoroastrianism (as Agni and Atar respectively), and the two faiths share similar elements (such as Yajna and Yasna) from a common proto-Indo-Iranian precursor religion, there has been debate on whether the Atashgah was originally a Hindu site or a Zoroastrian one.

Many scholars and officials have concluded that this is a Jwala temple due to the presence of several Hindu inscriptions in Sanskrit and Punjabi (as opposed to only one in Persian)and encounters with dozens of Hindus at the shrine or the regions between North India and Baku, as well as assessments of its Hindu-character by Parsi dasturs.

== Beyond the Indian subcontinent and Hinduism ==
She is known as Reakyaksa Devi (Khmer: រាក្យៈសាទេវី) in Cambodia as the wife of Lord Mangala From the hinduism culture passed down from the Khmer Empire and is the protective goddess of Tuesday, worshipped during the Cambodian New Year festival if the first day of the year falls on a Tuesday according to the Cambodian calendar (Khmer: ពិធីផ្ទេរតំណែងទេវតាឆ្នាំថ្មី) , as she is believed to descend from heaven to care for the people of this land for one year until the following New Year. In her journey there are some special details that are local and mixed with have cambodia folk culture Unique, such as the vehicle is a Horse. , It appears with only two hands and has the following symbol as Bow and arrow and Trishula , The color of her clothes is Purple and Her story and details have been adapted and blended with influences cambodia buddhism and has its own unique identity.
