= Dogra Muslims =

Southeast Asian Muslim community

The Dogra Muslim are a Muslim community found in the Indian state of Jammu and Kashmir. They are Muslim converts from the larger Hindu Dogra community. Many Dogra Muslim are also now found in the province of Punjab in Pakistan. They are also known as Rajahs, especially in Pakistan.

== History and origin ==
The term Dogra Muslim is restricted to those who inhabit a small hilly area comprising the districts of Kathua, Jammu, Samba and Udhampur. They are culturally distinct from the Chibhali community that inhabit the western part of the Jammu administrative region. The community are mainly converts from the Dogra community, with the conversions having occurred during the period of Mughal rule. They belong mainly to the Thakkar, Jats, Rathore, Manhas, Hindu Jaryal, Chib and Sulehria tribal groups. Many Dogra Muslim fled to Pakistan at the time of Indo-Pakistani War of 1947. They speak Dogri and Punjabi.

== Present circumstances ==
The Dogra Muslim inhabit a hilly terrain, and practice agriculture. They are endogamous, but unlike the Hindu Dogras, do not practice clan exogamy. In their homeland, the Dogra Muslim inhabit their own villages, although there are some mixed settlements with the Gujjar and Bakarwal, two neighbouring Muslim communities. Those Dogra Muslim who moved to Pakistan are settled mainly in Sialkot and Narowal districts of Punjab, inhabiting their villages, although there is shift towards adopting standard Punjabi.

== See also ==
- Muslim Rajputs
- Dogra
