= Langeh =

Clan of Rajputs in India

The Langeh are a clan of Tribal Rajputs in India, found mainly in the Jammu region of Jammu and Kashmir and parts of Himachal Pradesh.

== See also ==
- Dogra

"Langeh" is also written as "Langhe"
