= Duggar (region) =

- Geographical region
- Country: India
- States/UT(s): Jammu and Kashmir
- District(s): Jammu, Samba, Udhampur, Kathua, Reasi
- Largest city: Jammu

Area
  - Total: 9,235 km^{2} (3,566 sq mi)

Population (2011)
  - Total: 3,171,142

Languages
  - Major: Dogri
- Time zone: Indian Standard Time

Duggar, (Dogri pronunciation: [ɖʊɡːəɾ]) also known as Duggar Pradesh, is a region used to refer to the cultural homeland of the Dogras, primarily covering the southern portion of Jammu division in Indian–administered Jammu and Kashmir which includes present-day districts of Jammu, Samba, Udhampur, Kathua and Reasi.

== Etymology ==
The linguist George Grierson connected the term Duggar with the Rajasthani word Doonger which means 'hill', and Dogra with Donger. This opinion has lacked support because of the inconsistency of the ostensible changes from Rajasthani to Dogri (essentially the question of how Doonger became Duggar while Donger became Dogra), and has been contradicted by some scholars.

Yet another proposal stems from the word Durgara, the name of a kingdom mentioned in an eleventh century copper-plate inscription in the Bhuri Singh Museum in Chamba, Himachal Pradesh. The word Durgara means 'invincible' in several Northern Indo-Aryan languages, and could be an allusion to the ruggedness of the terrain of Duggar and the historically militarised and autonomous Dogra societies.

An article by Dharam Chand Prashant in the literary magazine Shiraza Dogri suggested that "the opinion that the word Duggar is a form of the word Duggarh sounds appropriate."

== History ==
Prior to the arrival of the Dogras in the region, the local inhabitants of the Durgara region (also known as Durgara Pradesh) were likely Khasas and Kanets, who originally inhabited the Western Himalayan-range. Migrations of Dogri-speaking peoples later followed. The Dogras claim descent from migrants who originated from the present-day regions of Uttar Pradesh, Bihar, and Bengal prior to the Islamic invasions of the Indian subcontinent. Most of the ruling families of the Pahari Hill States traditionally trace their ancestry back to Ayodhya, claiming descent from Sumitra, who was the last descendant of the Suryavanshi lineage of Rama. although is most likely origin myth to claim higher ritual status but are really descendents of local feudal clans.

An ancestor named Jambu Lochan is said to have first moved to the Jammu region, where he established the settlement of Jammu. According to local mythology beliefs, Jambu decided to construct a settlement at Jammu after he witnessed a wild goat and lion drinking from the same water-hole in a forest that was located at the site, being impressed by how two species of predator and prey could peacefully co-exist. From there onwards, branches of the family spread-out to conquer the surrounding mountainous areas of the region, establishing their own dynasties.

The Duggar region, also historically referred to as Duggar Pradesh or Durgara Desh, emerged as a distinct historical and cultural entity comprising a cluster of small and medium hill states and principalities in the northwestern Himalayan foothills. Medieval sources and later regional traditions describe Duggar Pradesh as consisting of twenty-two states broadly organised into two administrative-cultural spheres: the Jullundur Circle and the Dogra Circle. The Jullundur Circle included parts of Chamba, Nurpur, Guler, Datarpur, Siba, Jasbal, Kangra, lower Mandi, while the Dogra Circle encompassed parts of Chamba, Billawar–Basohli, Bhadu, Mankot–Ramkot, Bandralta–Ramnagar, Jasrota, Jammu, Bhuti, Chenani and also the regions of Kishtwar and Bhaderwah (both presently included in the Chenab Valley). Dogra tradition traces the ruling lineage to Agnigir, who is said to have migrated from Ayodhya to the Nagarkot (Kangra) region, with his descendants gradually establishing territorial control along the Ravi, Ujh and Tawi rivers. Raja Vayusharv founded an early capital near Kathua, while Raja Bahulochan extended authority to Bahu on the banks of the Tawi. The founding of Jammu is traditionally attributed to Raja Jambulochan, from whom the city derives its name, although Persian chronicles such as Tarikh-i-Azmi place the emergence of Jammu as a political centre around the 9th–10th century CE. Over time, the ruling house, later known as the Jamwal clan, consolidated power, with rulers initially using the suffix ‘Dhar’, later replaced by ‘Dev’ from the reign of Raja Surya Dev (920–987), and eventually incorporating the title ‘Singh’. The Jammu kingdom witnessed periodic divisions and reunifications, notably between Jammu and Bahu, before being reunified under Raja Hari Dev (1652–1688), during whose reign the designation ‘Jamwal’ became firmly associated with the rulers of Jammu. The Dogra polity continued under successive rulers until 1816, after which Jammu came under Sikh control, before Raja Kishore Singh was installed in 1820. His son Gulab Singh later emerged as the founder of the princely state of Jammu and Kashmir following the Treaty of Amritsar in 1846, marking the culmination of Duggar Pradesh’s transition from a regional confederation of hill states into a unified Dogra-ruled kingdom.

== Demographics ==
=== Languages ===
Languages of Duggar region (2011)
1. Dogri (73.4%)
2. Gojri (6.18%)
3. Kashmiri (5.08%)
4. Punjabi (4.77%)
5. Hindi (3.91%)
6. Pahadi (1.59%)
7. Pahari (0.79%)
8. Gaddi (0.53%)
9. Others (3.75%)

The most spoken languages in the proposed state will be Dogri followed by Hindi and Urdu.

=== Religion ===
Religions in Duggar region (2011)
1. Hinduism (82.4%)
2. Islam (12.3%)
3. Sikhism (4.45%)
4. Christianity (0.58%)
5. Others (0.26%)

Hinduism is the most followed religion in the region followed by Islam and Sikhism. The largest ethnic group are the Dogras.

Jammu city is the largest city of the region followed by Udhampur and Kathua.

== Political support ==
Many Duggar based politicians, activists and organisations have supported the creation of Duggar state. Choudhary Lal Singh. a prominent leader from Duggar has started demanding statehood for Duggar after abrogation of Article 370 and bifurcation of Jammu & Kashmir.

"Kashmir-based rulers have not only diminished Dogra culture but also taken away job opportunities. They have exploited the Dogra community for the past 60 years, holding resentment against us. They ignored Jammu’s tourism potential and deprived its people of their rightful entitlements," he said.

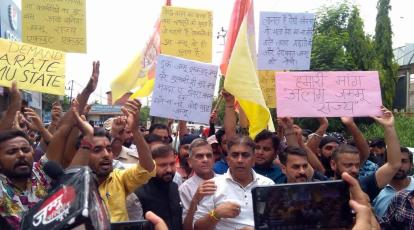
Supporters of IJP along with Ankur Sharma protesting for separate statehood.

Ikkjutt Jammu, an organisation based in Jammu launched their campaign for the creation of a separate state of Duggar or Jammu (political groups and individuals use both 'Duggar' and 'Jammu' when referring to the Dogri-speaking region). Ikkjut Jammu chairman, Advocate Ankur Sharma, informed The New Indian Express that the party has initiated a signature campaign advocating for separate statehood for the Jammu or Duggar.

According to Ikkjut General Secretary Vijay Shastri, over 1.50 lakh people have signed for separate statehood to Jammu during the ongoing signature campaign.

Many prominent leaders like Balwant Singh Mankotia, Harsh Dev Singh, Pawan Gupta have also supported the idea of having separate state for dogras.

Shiv Sena have also supported the creation of separate Duggar or Jammu state.

== Justifications for separation ==
The demand for a separate Jammu state stems from a long-standing perception of political and economic marginalisation. Jammu, with its distinct Dogra culture, language, and traditions, has often felt overshadowed by the Kashmir-centric policies of the erstwhile state. Advocates argue that the unique identity of Jammu has been diluted under the broader Jammu and Kashmir governance structure. By becoming a separate state, Jammu would have the autonomy to preserve and promote its cultural heritage, while also addressing its own regional aspirations.

Economically, many believe that Jammu’s development has been stunted due to an imbalance in resource distribution, with a disproportionate focus on Kashmir. The region's tourism potential, natural resources, and infrastructure needs have been overlooked, leaving Jammu’s economy underdeveloped. Separate statehood would allow Jammu to prioritise its own growth and development, giving it control over its resources, governance, and future. This would enable more effective administration and provide opportunities for the region to flourish independently.

Politically, many in Jammu feel that they have been underrepresented in the power structures of the region. Decisions made by a predominantly Kashmir-focused leadership have left Jammu residents feeling disconnected from governance. This political marginalisation has resulted in frustration, as Jammu’s issues often receive less attention and resources. By achieving separate statehood, Jammu could gain greater political representation, with governance focused on its specific challenges and priorities, ensuring that the voices of its people are heard and their needs addressed.

== See also ==
- Chenab Valley (region)
- Pir Panjal (region)
