= Jwala Ji Temple (Kashmir) =

Hindu shrine in the town of Khrew in the Pulwama district of Jammu and Kashmir, India

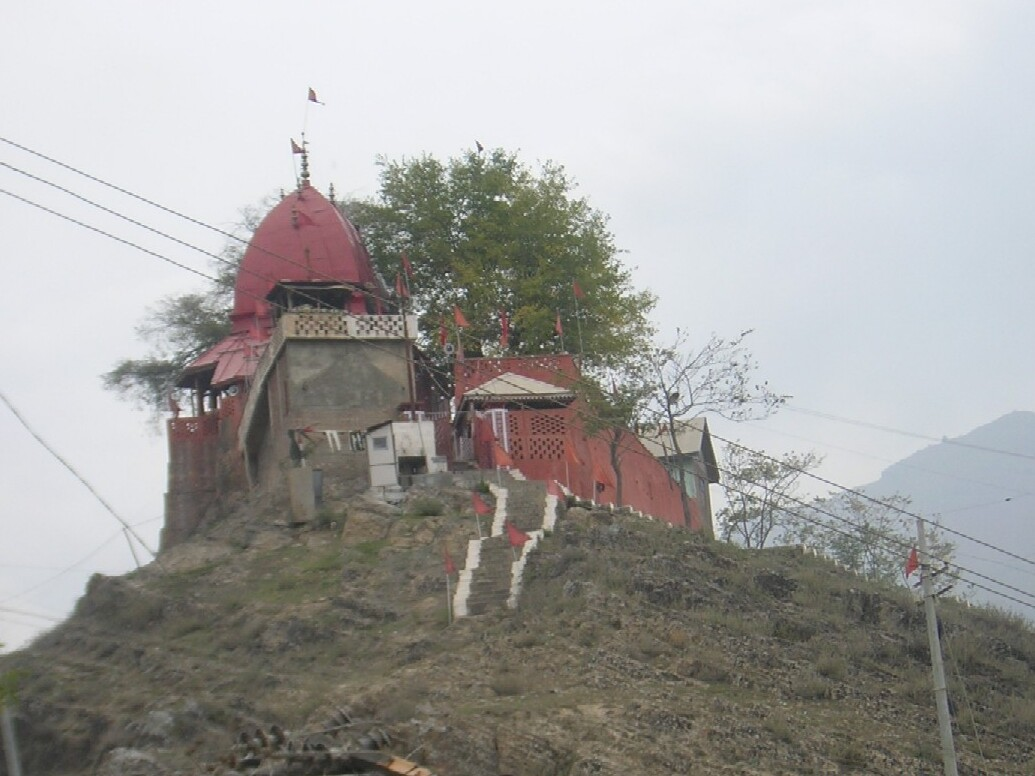
- Jwala Ji Mandir

- Location in Jammu and Kashmir

Religion
- Affiliation: Hinduism
- District: Pulwama
- Deity: Jwala Ji
- Festival: Jwala Mukhi Mela

Location
- Location: Khrew
- State: Jammu and Kashmir
- Country: India
- Coordinates: 34°01′18.2″N 74°59′41.6″E

Architecture
- Elevation: 1,607 m (5,272 ft)

Jwala Ji Temple (Kashmiri pronunciation: [zaːlɨ d͡ʒiː mandar]) or Jwalamukhi Temple (Kashmiri pronunciation: [zaːlɨ mɔkʰ mandar]) is Hindu shrine in the town of Khrew in the Pulwama district of Jammu and Kashmir, India.

The temple is dedicated to the deity Jwala Ji, the Kul Devi of many Kashmiri Hindu families.

Every year in the month of Ashadha, the Jwalamukhi Fair is held at the mandir; it exemplifies communal harmony common to the tradition of Kashmiriyat, with both Kashmiri Hindus and Kashmiri Muslim celebrating the festival.

== History ==
The historian Kalhana refers to the village "Khrew" in the Rajatarangini as "Khaduvi" and writes of three hundred and sixty freshwater springs being present there. According to Kalhana, at the hillside to the east of the village, a mystical diagram was drawn on a rock.

== Construction ==
The construction of the Jwal Ji temple dates back to the twentieth century, commissioned by Raja Daya Krishna Kaul. Legend has it that before the temple was built, the divine presence of Jwala Devi appeared as a radiant light (Jyoti) at this sacred site. The story goes that the gods were on a quest to seize Kubera's treasure, but the demons tried to stop them. Upon the deities' request, Jwala Devi intervened and halted the gods' journey at this location. In response to the plea of the deities, Jwala Devi decided to reside permanently at this place, leading to the establishment of the revered Jwal Ji temple.

== Holy Spring ==
At the base of the hill, the shrine has a holy spring locally called Bod Nag, Aneek Nag, Anu Nag, or Nagabal. It is customary for pilgrims to perform ablutions with the water of the holy spring before entering the temple.

== See also ==
- Jwala Ji
