= Dogri language =

Indo-Aryan language spoken primarily in Jammu

Dogri
- डोगरी · 𑠖𑠵𑠌𑠤𑠮 · ڈوگری
- The word Dogri in the Devanagari, Dogra, and Perso-Arabic scripts.
- Pronunciation: [ɖoːɡ.ɾiː]
- Native to: India; Pakistan
- Region: Jammu; Himachal Pradesh; Punjab
- Ethnicity: Dogras
- Native speakers: 2.6 million in India (2011)
- Language family: Indo-European: Indo-Iranian; Indo-Aryan; Northern; Western Pahari; Dogri
- Writing system: Devanagari; Dogra script; Perso-Arabic; Mahajani (historically)

Official status
- Official language in: India: Jammu and Kashmir

Language codes
- ISO 639-2: doi
- ISO 639-3: doi – inclusive code Individual codes: dgo – Dogri proper xnr – Kangri
- Glottolog: indo1311
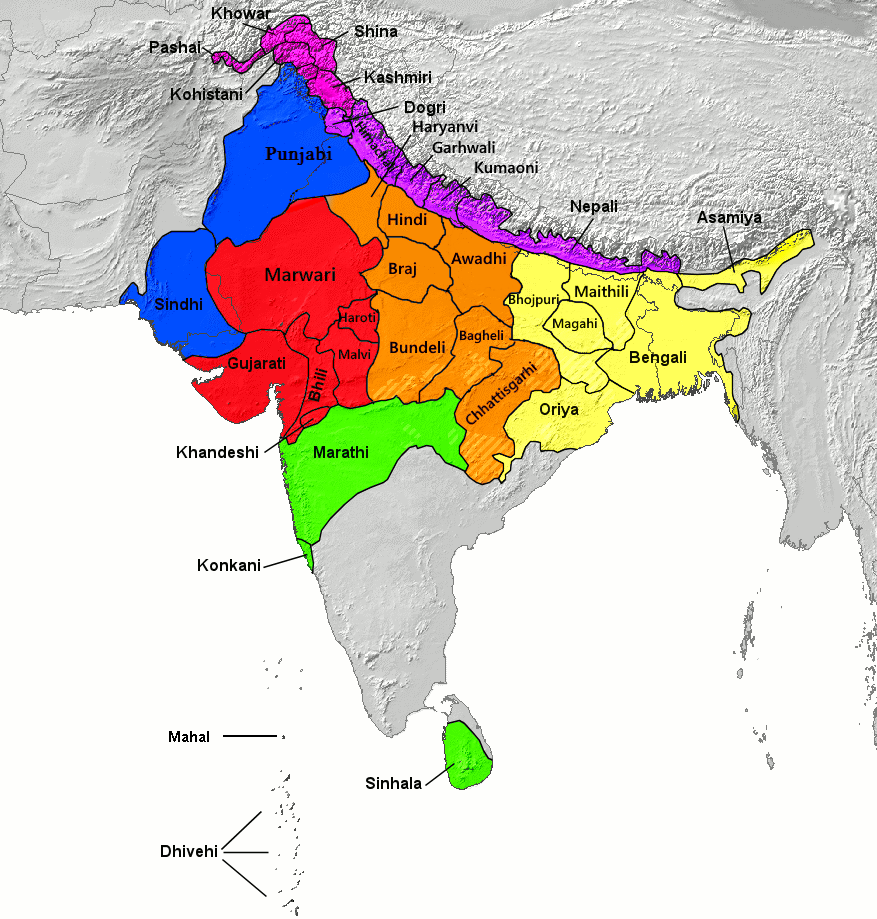
- Major Indo-Aryan languages (The Dogra language in the northern of punjabi - marked in purple-blue area)

Dogri (Devanagari: डोगरी, Dogra script: 𑠖𑠵𑠌𑠤𑠮, Nastaliq: ڈوگری, Romanised: Ḍōgrī, IPA: [ɖoːɡ.ɾiː]) is an Indo-Aryan language of the Western Pahari group, primarily spoken by the Dogra people native to the Jammu Division of India's Jammu and Kashmir; with smaller groups of speakers in the adjoining regions of the Indian states of Himachal Pradesh and Punjab, as well as Pakistan-administered Azad Kashmir and the Pakistani province of Punjab.

It is currently spoken in the districts of Kathua, Jammu, Samba, Udhampur and parts of Reasi District (mostly in Reasi, Katra and Pouni Tehsil) of Jammu division. Unusually for an Indo-European language, Dogri is tonal, a trait it shares with other Western Pahari languages and Punjabi. It has several varieties, all with greater than 80% lexical similarity.

Dogri is spoken by 2.6 million people in India (as of the 2011 census). It has been among the country's 22 scheduled languages since 2003. It is also one of the five official languages of the union territory of Jammu and Kashmir.

== Script ==
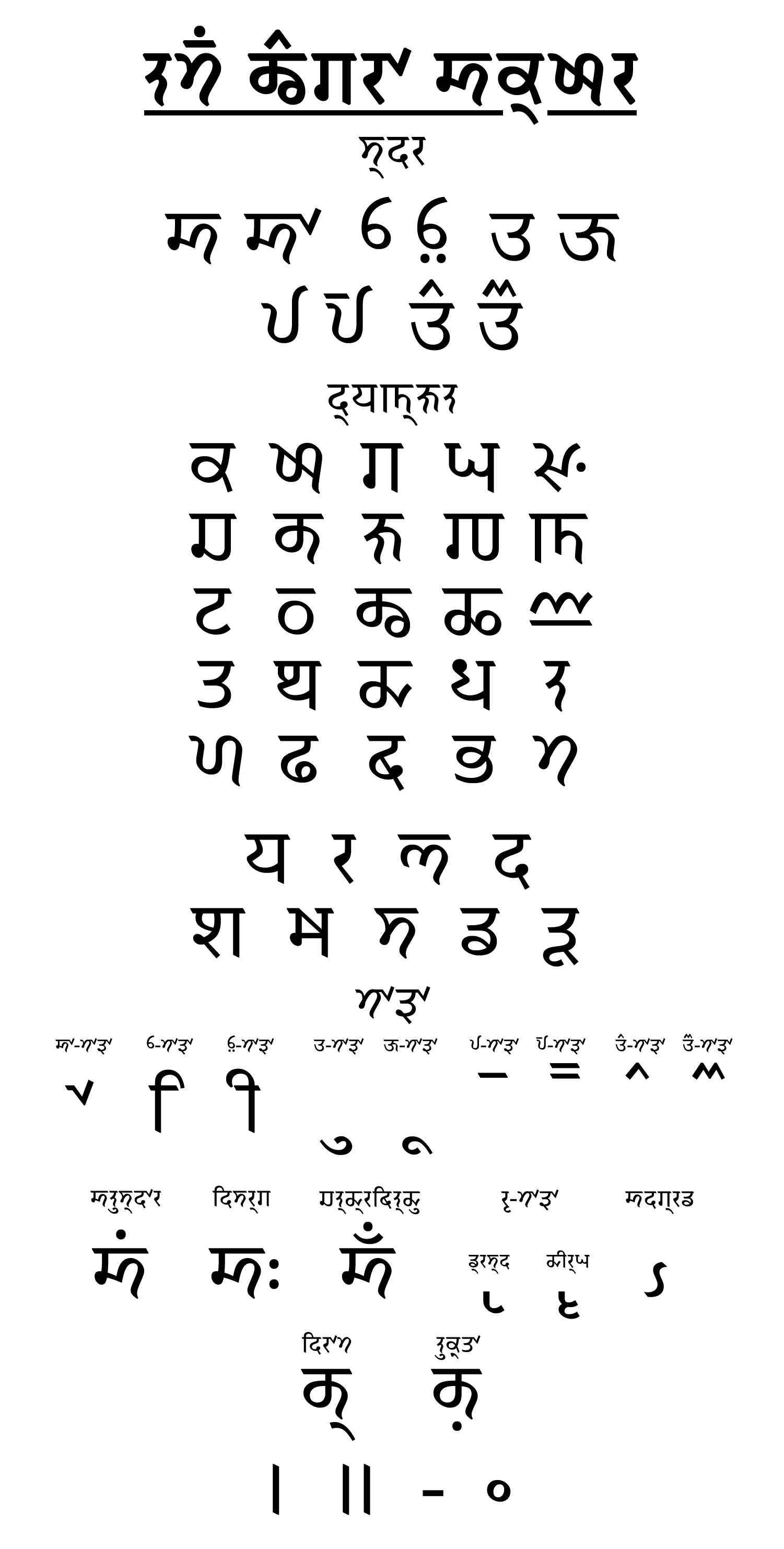
Dogra Alphabet Chart

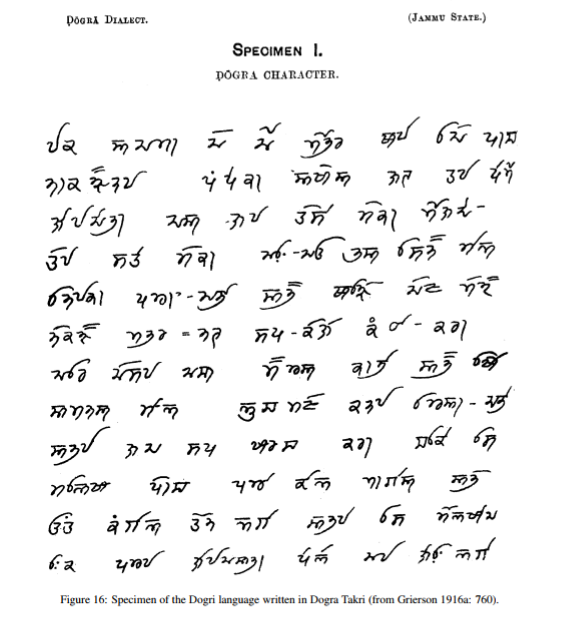
Dogra Script Specimen

Dogri was originally written in the old Dogra Akkhar script – a modified version of Takri. A modified version of this script was created by the order of Maharaja Ranbir Singh of Jammu and Kashmir, which was then called Name Dogra Akkhar. Official documents were written in this new script; however it never caught on among the general Dogri-speaking populace. Currently, Devanagari is the officially recognised script for Dogri in India and virtually all Dogri literature is published in it.

== Phonology ==
=== Consonants ===
		Labial	Dental/ Alveolar	Retroflex	Post-alv./ Palatal	Velar	Glottal
Nasal		m	n	ɳ	ɲ	ŋ	
Plosive/ Affricate	voiceless	p	t̪	ʈ	t͡ʃ	k	
Plosive/ Affricate	aspirated	pʰ	t̪ʰ	ʈʰ	t͡ʃʰ	kʰ	
Plosive/ Affricate	voiced	b	d̪	ɖ	d͡ʒ	ɡ	
Fricative	voiceless	(f)	s		ʃ	(x)	
Fricative	voiced		(z)			(ɣ)	ɦ
Tap			ɾ	ɽ			
Approximant		ʋ	l		j		

- Gemination occurs in all consonants except the consonants /ɾ ɳ ɽ ʃ/.
- Retroflex consonants /ɽ ɳ/ rarely occur in word initial position.
- /f z x ɣ/ only occur from Perso-Arabic loan words. /f/ is also heard as an allophone of /pʰ/.
- /ɾ/ can also marginally be heard as trilled [r] in some speech.
- In some words, /s/ can become more weakly pronounced, or even eliminated and replaced by a glottal fricative sound [h].
- A palatal nasal sound [ɲ] typically occurs when a dental nasal precedes a post-alveolar affricate consonant, rarely occurring in words word-initially or medially.
- A velar nasal sound [ŋ] typically occurs when a dental nasal precedes a velar plosive consonant, and rarely occurs word-initially or medially.

=== Vowels ===
	Front	Central	Back
Close	iː		uː
Near-close	ɪ		ʊ
Close-mid	eː	ə	oː
Open-mid	ɛː	ə	ɔː
Open		aː	

- There are nasalized variations of the following vowels /ã ĩ ũ ẽ ɛ̃ õ ɔ̃/.
- Vowel sounds are often nasalized when occurring before a word-medial or word-final /n/, except when /n/ occurs before a word-final vowel.
- /ʊ/ can have a marginal upgliding allophone [ʊᵛ] when occurring before a /a/ vowel sound.
- A word-final /aː/ is realized as a back sound [ɑː] and may also drift toward a centralized [äː] sound.

== Some common words ==
Name Dogra Akkhar	Devanagari	Perso-Arabic	IPA	English translation
𑠪𑠬𑠷	हां	ہاں	[ã̀ː]	Yes
𑠝𑠳𑠃𑠷	नेईं	نیئِیں	[neː.ĩː]	No
𑠪𑠭𑠤𑠋	हिरख	ہِرکھ	[ɪ̀ɾkʰ]	Love
𑠊𑠝𑠹𑠝𑠴	कन्नै	کنَّے	[kən.nɛː]	With
𑠊𑠳𑠪𑠹	केह्	کیہ	[kéː]	What
𑠊𑠮	की	کی	[kiː]	Why
𑠌𑠬𑠩	गास	گاس	[gaːs]	Sky
𑠠'𑠤𑠬	ब'रा	ب'را	[bə́.ɾaː]	Year

== Tone rules ==
These are rules of writing tones in Dogri using Devanagari Script. They are as follows:-

- Just like Punjabi, Dogri also uses the letters घ (gʱə), झ (d͡ʒʱə), ढ (ɖʱə), ध (d̪ʱə), भ (bʱə) and ढ़ (ɽʱə) for tonal uses. When at the beginning of the word, it has a high-falling tone; i.e.:- घ (kə̂), झ (t͡ʃə̂), ढ (ʈə̂), ध (t̪ə̂), भ (pə̂) and ढ़ (ɽə̂). When in the middle and final position of the word, the preceding vowel has a low-rising tone; i.e.:- अघ (ə̌ɡ), अझ (ə̌d͡ʒ), अढ (ə̌ɖ), अध (ə̌d̪), अभ (ə̌b) and अढ़ (ə̌ɽ). Examples:- घड़ी (kə̂ɽiː)- clock, and बध (bə̌d̪).
- Unlike Punjabi, there is no ह (ɦə) sound and it has a high-falling tone in all positions; i.e.:- हत्थ (ə̂t̪ːʰə)- hand.
- To indicate a low-rising tone in the middle of words, Dogri uses ह् (ह with a halant) to indicate it when the preceding vowel is long; i.e.:- आ (aː), ई (iː), ऊ (uː), ए (eː), ऐ (ɛː), ओ (oː) and औ (ɔː). Example:- साह्ब (sǎːb)- sahab. When the preceding vowel is short, i.e., - अ (ə), इ (ɪ) and उ (ʊ); a combining apostrophe (ʼ) is used. Example:- लʼत्त (lə̌tː)- leg.
- The characters mentioned in the first point can also be used to indicate high-falling tone in the middle of the words when between a short vowel and a long vowel.

Some examples are shown below.

Name Dogra Akkhar	Devanagari	Perso-Arabic	IPA	Tone	English translation
𑠌𑠥𑠹𑠥	गल्ल	گلّ	[gəl.lə]	Equal	Thing
𑠌ʼ𑠥𑠹𑠥	गʼल्ल	گʼلّ	[gə́l.lə]	Rising	Cheek
𑠊𑠤	कर	کر	[kəɾ]	Equal	Do
𑠍𑠤	घर	گھر	[kə̀ɾ]	Falling	Home

== Historical references ==
In the year 1317, Amir Khusro, the famous Urdu and Persian poet, referred to Duger (Dogri) while describing the languages and dialects of India as follows: "Sindhi-o-Lahori-o-Kashmiri-o-Duger."

== Official status ==
Dogri is one of the 22 Scheduled languages of India, officially recognized in December 2003 through the 92nd Constitutional Amendment, which added it to the Eighth Schedule of the Indian Constitution. In September 2020, the Parliament of India passed the Jammu and Kashmir Official Languages Act, declaring Dogri as one of the five official languages of the Union Territory of Jammu and Kashmir, along with Hindi, Urdu, English, and Kashmiri.

== Theories on name origin ==
Intellectuals in the court of Maharaja Ranbir Singh of Jammu and Kashmir described Duggar as a distorted form of the word Dwigarta, which means 'two troughs', a possible reference to the Mansar and Surinsar lakes.

The linguist George Grierson connected the term Duggar with the Rajasthani word Doonger which means 'hill', and Dogra with Donger. This opinion has lacked support because of the inconsistency of the ostensible changes from Rajasthani to Dogri (essentially the question of how Doonger became Duggar while Donger became Dogra), and has been contradicted by some scholars.

Yet another proposal stems from the word Durgara, the name of a kingdom mentioned in an eleventh century copper-plate inscription in the Bhuri Singh Museum in Chamba, Himachal Pradesh. The word Durgara means 'invincible' in several Northern Indo-Aryan languages, and could be an allusion to the ruggedness of the terrain of Duggar and the historically militarised and autonomous Dogra societies.

In 1976, the experts attending the Language Session of the All India Oriental Conference held in Dharwad, Karnataka, could not reach consensus on the Dwigarta and Durgara hypotheses, but did manage agreement on a Doonger-Duggar connection. In a subsequent All India Oriental Conference held at Jaipur in 1982, the linguists agreed that the culture, language and history of Rajasthan and Duggar share some similarities. It was also suggested that the words Duggar and Dogra are common in some parts of Rajasthan. Specifically, it was asserted that areas with many forts are called Duggar, and their inhabitants are accordingly known as Dogras. The land of Duggar also has many forts, which may support the above opinion.

An article by Dharam Chand Prashant in the literary magazine Shiraza Dogri suggested that "the opinion that the word Duggar is a form of the word Duggarh sounds appropriate."

== Recent history ==
Dogri folk song sung by a lady in an interview

In modern times, a notable Dogri translation (in the New Dogra script) of the Sanskrit classic mathematical opus Lilavati, by the noted mathematician Bhaskaracharya (b. 1114 AD), was published by the Vidya Vilas Press, Jammu in 1873. As Sanskrit literacy remained confined to a few, the late Maharaja Ranbir Singh had the Lilavati translated into Dogri by Jyotshi Bisheshwar, then principal of Jammu Pathshala.

Dogri has an established tradition of poetry, fiction and dramatic works. Recent poets range from the 18th-century Dogri poet Kavi Dattu (1725–1780) in Raja Ranjit Dev's court to Professor Ram Nath Shastri and Mrs. Padma Sachdev. Kavi Dattu is highly regarded for his Barah Massa (Twelve Months), Kamal Netra (Lotus Eyes), Bhup Bijog and Bir Bilas. Shiraza Dogri is a Dogri literary periodical issued by the Jammu and Kashmir Academy of Art, Culture and Languages, which is a notable publisher of modern Dogri literary work, another being the Dogri Sanstha. Popular recent songs include Pala Shapaiya Dogariya, Manne di Mauj and Shhori Deya. The noted Pakistani singer Malika Pukhraj had roots in Duggar, and her renditions of several Dogri songs continue to be popular in the region. Some devotional songs (bhajans) composed by Karan Singh have gained increasing popularity over time, including Kaun Kareyaan Teri Aarti.

Dogri programming features regularly on Radio Kashmir (a division of All India Radio), and Doordarshan (Indian state television) broadcasts in Jammu and Kashmir. However, Dogri does not have a dedicated state television channel yet, unlike Kashmiri (which has the Doordarshan Koshur channel, available on cable and satellite television throughout India).

Official recognition of the language has been gradual, but progressive. On 2 August 1969, the General Council of the Sahitya Academy, Delhi recognized Dogri as an "independent modern literary language" of India, based on the unanimous recommendation of a panel of linguists. Dogri is one of the official languages of the Indian union territory of Jammu and Kashmir. On 22 December 2003, in a major milestone for the official status of the language, Dogri was recognized as a national language of India in the Indian constitution.

In 2005, a collection of over 100 works of prose and poetry in Dogri published over the last 50 years was made accessible online at the Central Institute of Indian Languages (CIIL), Mysore. This included works of eminent writer Dhinu Bhai Panth, Professor Madan Mohan Sharma, B.P. Sathai and Ram Nath Shastri.

Dogri folk tale of Baba Kaliveer ji

== Sample text ==
The following text is from Article 1 of the Universal Declaration of Human Rights.

Dogri (Name Dogra Akkhar script)	𑠩𑠬𑠤𑠳 𑠢𑠝𑠯𑠊𑠹𑠋 𑠢𑠴𑠪𑠹𑠢𑠬 𑠙𑠳 𑠀𑠜𑠭𑠊𑠬𑠤𑠳𑠷 𑠛𑠳 𑠠𑠭𑠧𑠳 𑠏 𑠑𑠝𑠢𑠴 𑠚𑠢𑠬𑠷 𑠩𑠯𑠙𑠴𑠷𑠙𑠤 𑠙𑠳 𑠠𑠤𑠵𑠠𑠤 𑠝। 𑠄'𑠝𑠳𑠷𑠌𑠮 𑠠𑠯𑠛𑠹𑠜𑠮 𑠙𑠳 𑠑𑠢𑠮𑠤𑠴 𑠛𑠮 𑠛𑠳𑠝 𑠚𑠹𑠪𑠵𑠃 𑠇 𑠙𑠳 𑠄'𑠝𑠳𑠷𑠌𑠮 𑠁𑠞𑠰𑠷-𑠠𑠭𑠏𑠹𑠏𑠳𑠷 𑠡𑠬𑠃𑠏𑠬𑠤𑠳 𑠛𑠳 𑠡𑠬𑠦𑠴 𑠊𑠝𑠹𑠝𑠴 𑠠𑠹𑠣𑠪𑠬𑠤 𑠊𑠤𑠝𑠬 𑠥𑠵𑠫𑠛𑠬 𑠇।
Dogri (Devanagari script)	सारे मनुक्ख मैह्मा ते अधिकारें दे बिशे च जनमै थमां सुतैंतर ते बरोबर न। उ'नेंगी बुद्धी ते जमीरै दी देन थ्होई ऐ ते उ'नेंगी आपूं-बिच्चें भाईचारे दे भावै कन्नै ब्यहार करना लोड़दा ऐ।
Dogri (Perso-Arabic script)	سارے منکّھ میہما تے ادھکاریں دے بشے چ جنمے تھماں ستیںتر تے بروبر ن۔ ا'نیںگی بُدھِّی تے جمیرے دی دین تھہوئی اے تے ا'نیںگی آپوں-بچّیں بھائیچارے دے بھاوے کنّے بیہار کرنا لوڑدا اے۔
Dogri transliteration (ISO 15919)	Sārē manukkha maihmā tē adhikārēṁ dē biśē ca janmai thamāṁ sutaintar tē barōbar na. U'nēṁgī buddhī tē jamīrai dī dēn thhōī ai tē u'nēṁgī āpūṁ-biccēṁ bhāīcārē dē bhāvai kannai byahār karnā lōṛdā ai.
Dogri IPA	[saːɾeː mənʊkkʰə mɛ́ːmaː t̪eː əd̪ɪ̀kaːɾẽː d̪eː bɪʃeː t͡ʃə d͡ʒənmɛː t̪ʰəmãː sʊt̪ɛːnt̪əɾ t̪eː bəɾoːbəɾ nə ‖ ʊ́nẽːgiː bʊd̪d̪ìː t̪eː d͡ʒəmiːɾɛː d̪iː d̪eːn t̪ʰòːiː ɛː t̪eː ʊ́nẽːgiː aːpũːbɪt̪t͡ʃẽː pàːiːt͡ʃaːɾeː d̪eː pàːʋɛː kənnɛː bjəàːɾ kəɾnaː loːɽd̪aː ɛː ‖]
English translation	All human beings are born free and equal in dignity and rights. They are endowed with reason and conscience and should act towards one another in a spirit of brotherhood.

== See also ==
- Dogras
- Dogri cinema
- Dogri literature
- Dogri script
- Duggar (region)
- List of Sahitya Akademi Award winners for Dogri

== Bibliography ==
- Gopal Haldar (2000). Languages of India. New Delhi: National Book Trust
