= Shiraza Dogri =

Shiraza Dogri (Dogri: शीराज़ा डोगरी or شیرازه ڈوگری) is a bimonthly Dogri-language literary magazine from Jammu and Kashmir that is published by the Jammu and Kashmir Academy of Art, Culture and Languages. Its publication began in 1964 as a biannual periodical, but the frequency increased to quarterly in 1970 and bimonthly in 1979.

It is published in language Urdu also.

== See also ==
- Dogri
