= Surinsar Lake =

Lake in Jammu and Kashmir

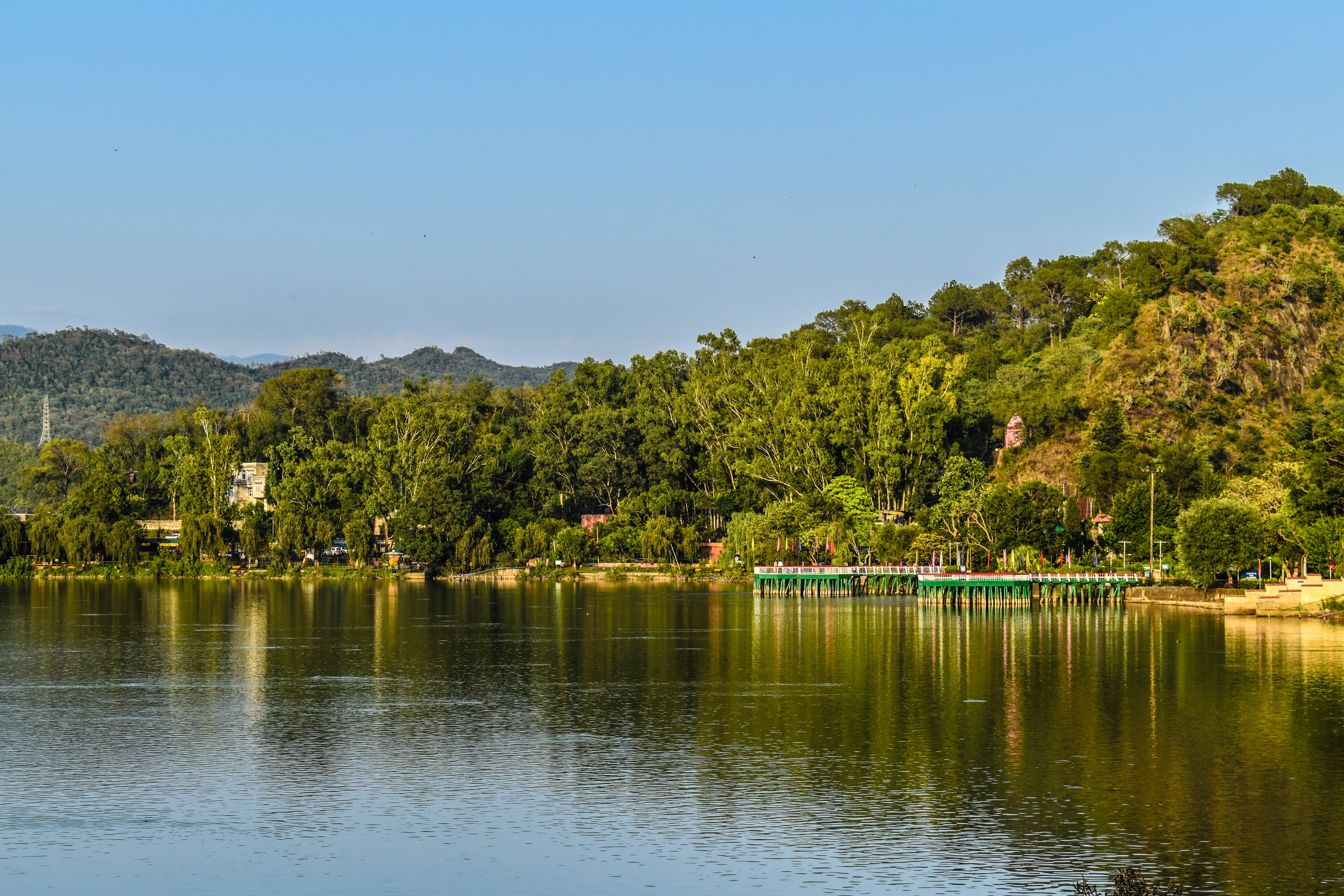
- Surinsar Lake view and a small island at the middle of lake in Samba district (J&K)

- Location within India
- Location: Surinsar, Samba district, Jammu and Kashmir
- Coordinates: 32.696076°N 75.146806°E
- Basin countries: India
- Islands: Small island at the middle

Ramsar Wetland
- Official name: Surinsar-Mansar Lakes
- Designated: 8 November 2005
- Reference no.: 1573

Surinsar Lake is a lake which is situated in Surinsar in Samba district in Indian union territory of Jammu and Kashmir. It is located 19 km from Samba town & 42 km (26 mi) from Jammu city by road, surrounded by hills and dense forests, and has some mythological importance. Surinsar and Mansar Lakes are considered as twin lakes, as Mansar is located 9 km (5.6 mi) away from it. The Surinsar Mansar Wildlife Sanctuary is located in the midst of both lakes.

The region is populated with abundant fauna, flora, and avifauna. A small island is at the middle of the lake. This island is home to thousands of bats. Due to some religious beliefs, swimming and boating were discouraged, but in recent times there has been extensive development, either in infrastructure or in boating. This has allowed for the opening of recreational options, such as a climbing wall, open theatre, baby and family parks, restaurants, etc. It is becoming the most sought destination of tourists in Jammu region and regularly there are thousands who are travelling to Surinsar Lake.

== History ==
According to Hindu mythology, the origin of this lake is associated with the warrior of Mahabharata, Arjun. It is believed that son of Arjun shot an illustrious arrow on the ground of Mansar and a spring gushed from the land and became Surinsar Lake. Firstly, it was known as Surang Sar (Note: Surang: a tunnel, is a long passage usually through a hill, which has been made under the ground.) and by the time it became Surinsar.
