= Jwala Devi Temple (Uttar Pradesh) =

Temple in Shaktinagar, Sonbhadra, Uttar Pradesh, India

Jwaladevi Temple Jwala Mukhi Temple
- ज्वाला देवी मन्दिर

Religion
- Affiliation: Hinduism
- Deity: Jwala Ji
- Festival: Navratra

Location
- Location: Shaktinagar
- State: Uttar Pradesh
- Country: India

Architecture
- Creator: King Udit Narayan Singh
- Completed: 1676

Jwaladevi Temple (ज्वालादेवी मन्दिर) is located in Shaktinagar which is in Sonbhadra district of Uttar Pradesh. The Jwaladevi temple is dedicated to Goddess Jwala Ji. This is an age old Ashtagrih temple of Jwala Devi & one of the 51 Shakta pithas of India. The old temple is believed to be 1000 years old. The old temple was constructed by Raja Udit Narayan Singh of singrauli Gaharwal village. The new temple has been built replacing the old one. Here the Front tongue of Devi Sati is worshipped. She is venerated as the kuldevi, family goddess, of Katoch Rajputs, Bhatia, Dhadwals and Meisuria people.

== History ==
Mythology recognizes that because of ego, Daksha Prajapati did not invite, to the ritual the Lord of lords Shiva and humiliated him, husband of Sati. To destroy the ego of the father, she consciously left her physical body. This angered Shiva. He originated Veerbhadra from his coma and ordered the slaughter of Prajapati Daksha. Prajapati was killed by Veerbhadra. After convincing the gods Shiva the Creator placed the severed head of the goat in place of head on the Prajapati. Jwaladevi Temple is a place that is believed to have been blessed with the presence of Shakti due to the falling of Front tongue of devi from the corpse of Sati Devi, when Lord Shiva carried her and wandered throughout Aryavarta in sorrow.

== Importance ==
The Idol of the main deity is located in the Sanctum Sanctorum (central place of the temple). The old black stone idol which was in the old temple has been installed along with other deities surrounding the main idol. It is believed that people offer gold/silver tongue as offerings here after their wishes are fulfilled.

== Attractions ==
The puja of the temple is being regularly performed by the priests whose family has been doing it for last 12 generations. Presently there are 12 priests involved in performing the routine puja at this temple. Jawalamukhi cave is located at a distance of 1 km from the temple. It is said that the cave had three openings earlier but presently the cave is filled with water of a spring and has only a single opening
