= Vijay Mahajan (academic) =

- Born: April 5, 1948 (age 78); Jammu, India
- Title: John P. Harbin Centennial Chair

Academic background
- Education: University of Texas at Austin; Indian Institute of Technology Kanpur

Academic work
- Discipline: Marketing
- Institutions: University of Texas at Austin
- Website: https://www.mccombs.utexas.edu/Directory/Profiles/Mahajan-Vijay

Vijay Mahajan is the John P. Harbin Centennial Chair in Business at McCombs School of Business, University of Texas at Austin. He was born on April 5, 1948, in Jammu, India.

== Books ==
- Mahajan, Vijay, and Kamini Banga. The 86 percent solution: How to succeed in the biggest market opportunity of the next 50 years. Pearson Education, 2005.
- Vijay Mahajan. 2009. Africa Rising. Wharton School Publishing.
- Vijay Mahajan. 2012. The Arab World Unbound: Tapping Into The Power of 350 Million Consumers. Wiley, Jossey, Bass.
- Vijay Mahajan and Yoram Wind, eds. 1986. Innovation Diffusion Models of New Product Acceptance. Cambridge, MA: Ballinger Publishing Co.
