= Rajiv Dogra =

Indian diplomat, television commentator, writer and an artist

- Education: Indian Institute of Technology (BHU) Varanasi
- Occupation: Diplomat

Indian Ambassador to Italy

Indian Ambassador to Romania
- In office 1997-2001

Rajiv Dogra is an Indian diplomat, television commentator, writer and an artist. He was the Indian Ambassador to Italy and Romania and Consul General to Karachi, Pakistan. He was also India's Permanent Representative to the United Nations Agencies based in Rome.
