= Dham =

Traditional Indian food festival

Dhaam is a traditional feast celebrated in the Indian state of Himachal Pradesh, Jammu region and some parts of Punjab especially in Talwara and Mukerian region. Dhaam is prepared and served on every joyful event or celebration in the family. Temples also serve dhaam on most of the religious festivals or auspicious dates.

Himachali food varies from region to region. The cuisine of Himachal Pradesh is largely based on the climate and topography of the state. While the everyday meal is the usual dal-chawal-subzi-roti, special dishes are cooked during festive occasions. Amongst festive food, the traditional meal, dham (lunch served in traditional occasions) finds instant mention. The traditional dham is celebrated with great enthusiasm. The dham offers one with an opportunity to be acquainted with the various delicacies of the state.

Dham is cooked only by botis (a particular caste of Brahmins who are hereditary chefs). Preparation for this elaborate mid-day meal begins the night before. The utensils used for cooking the food are normally brass ones called "batohi", "baltohi" or "charoti" in local languages. It is served in courses to people who sit on floor. The food is served on leaf plates called pattal or pattlu (in Kangri language and other Himachali/ Pahari languages). The dham includes plain aromatic rice, fried pulses or dal, spicy vegetable curry of red kidney beans and many desserts to satisfy one's appetite.

The traditional dham differs in every region of the state. The typical menu for dham would start with rice, sambhar and a madra of rajma (red kidney beans) or chole (chik pea) which is cooked in yoghurt which is prepared in unique style by adding approximately twenty spices. This is followed by mash dal, topped by khatta (sweet and sour sauce) made of tamarind and jaggery, paneer made by adding dahi and butter, curry, mukand bari, chohraiyan ka khatta. The dham ends with the mitha bhaat (dessert) (bhaat means rice in the Kangri Language and other Himachali/Pahari languages) – mithdee, a particular dish of sweet rice (made of boondi or bread crumbs etc.).

Dham is a mid day meal served to the people in Himachali culture on the occasions of marriage, birthday party, retirement party or any religious days. In dham firstly cooked rice and a type of dal called moong dal is served. After that a kidney bean shaped pulse known as rajma (madra) is also served and then palda, khatta, maa ki aaal (urad) and at the end meetha dhaat which means dessert is served including kheer made up of rice, milk and sugar. It is different in every district, mandeali dham is delicacy of Mandi district, kullvi dham and Kangri Dham are famous in Kullu district and Kangra Valley i.e. Kangra district, Hamirpur Distt and Una district respectively. Kangri Dham has been ranked best out of all

== See also ==
- Thali
- Sadya
- Dastarkhwan
- Siddu
