= Pir Panjal Region (Jammu Division) =

Pir Panjal
- Region
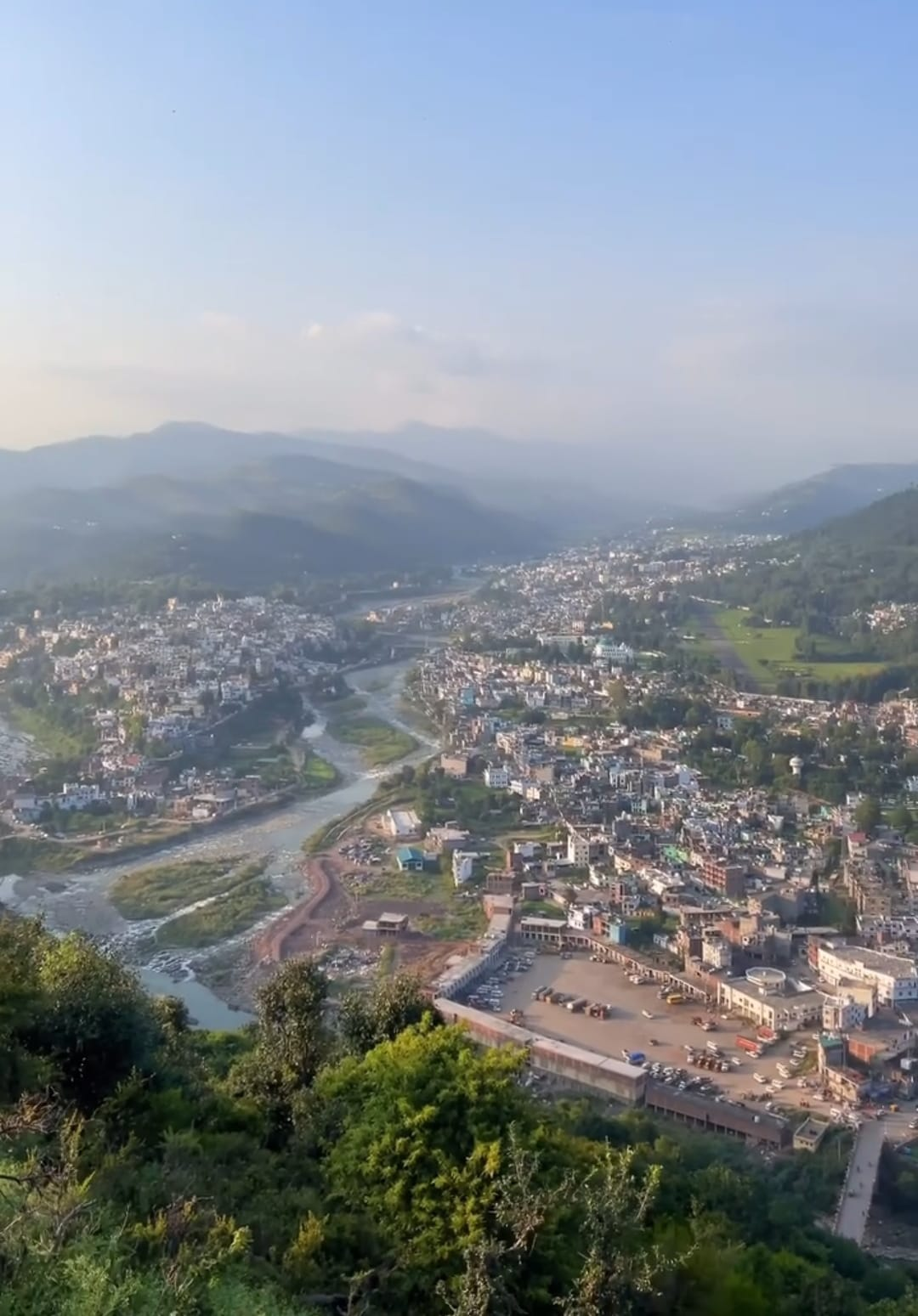
- Rajouri city's aerial view.
- Country: India
- Union Territory: Jammu and Kashmir
- Revenue Division: Jammu

Area
  - Land: 4,304 km^{2} (1,662 sq mi)

Population (2011)
  - Total: 1,119,250
  - Density: 260.0/km^{2} (673.5/sq mi)
- Districts: Poonch; Rajouri
- Vehicle Registration Numbers: JK11(Rajouri), JK12(Poonch)
- Police Zone: Rajouri Poonch Range
- Lok Sabha Constituency: Anantnag–Rajouri Lok Sabha constituency

The Pir Panjal Region is region located in the southwestern part of the Pir Panjal Range in the Jammu Division of the Indian-administered union territory of Jammu and Kashmir. This name particularly refers to the districts of Poonch and Rajouri.

== Name ==
The Pir Panjal region is named after the Pir Panjal Pass, whose original name as recorded by Srivara, is Panchaladeva (IAST: Pāñcāladeva, meaning the deity of Panchala). Panchala is a kingdom mentioned in the Mahabharata in the northwest Uttar Pradesh. However, there are also traditions that place the Mahabharata regions in western Punjab and southern Kashmir. Scholar Dineshchandra Sircar has analysed the geography described in the Shakti‐sangama Tantra, where this is indeed the case.Scholar M. A. Stein believes that the concept of deity must have been translated into that of a Pir after the region was Islamised.

== Geography ==
The Pir Panjal Region includes the districts of Poonch and Rajouri. The districts border Kashmir Division to the north, Azad Kashmir to the west and the Jammu Division to the south and east. As of 2023, this region is considered a backward area in terms of development.

The Nowshera Tunnel stands as the first tunnel ever constructed in the Pir Panjal region, establishing a historical milestone.

== Economy ==
The economy of the Pir Panjal Region is characterized by its rich natural resources and diverse economic activities. This region is endowed with abundant resources, including forests, herbal plants, minerals, and favorable agro-climatic conditions. Tourism and agro-based industries play a pivotal role in the region's economic landscape, offering significant investment potential.

Agriculture in the Pir Panjal region focuses on the cultivation of a variety of fruits, such as apples, almonds, cherries, apricots, and citrus fruits. Additionally, the region is known for its skilled workforce in producing delicate handicraft items, including embroidery, wood carving, fur and leather products, woodwork, and various traditional crafts. The area's mineral resources, particularly limestone, are essential for the cement industry. The government's strategic areas of focus encompass food processing, agro-based industries, auto-ancillaries, precision engineering, mineral exploration, and eco-tourism, making the Pir Panjal region an attractive destination for investment.

== Demographics ==
Muslims form a majority in the two districts constituting the Pir Panjal region. About 75% of the population was Muslim according to the 2011 census, and the rest were 22.73% Hindus and 2.38% Sikhs.

Pir Panjal region: mother-tongue of population, according to the 2011 Census.
1. Pahari (52.8%)
2. Gojri (37.8%)
3. Kashmiri (3.79%)
4. Hindi (2.40%)
5. Others (3.22%)
Religions in Pir Panjal (2011)
1. Islam (74.5%)
2. Hinduism (22.7%)
3. Sikhism (2.38%)
4. Others (0.37%)

== Tourism ==
Pir Panjal is also the hub of hilly tourist attractions after Valley of Kashmir & Chenab Valley, some of them are as follows;

- Pir Ki Gali
- Shrine of Sayin Miran Bakshi
- Shrine of Baba Ghulam Shah Badshah (Shahdara Sharif)
- Chingus Sarai
- Noori Chambh
- Loran Valley
- Jamia Masjid
- Poonch Fort
- Historic Mughal Road
- MANGLA MATA TEMPLE IN JHANGER NOWSHERA (RAJOURI)

== Demand For Divisional Status ==
There has been a movement demanding divisional for the Pir Panjal by various social and political activists for a long time. The demand rose in 2018 and 2019 when Ladakh got divisional status and the former Chief Minister of Jammu and Kashmir, Omar Abdullah added "Two Separate Divisional Status for Chenab Valley and Pir Panjal Region" to his party's political agenda.

As of 2021, the movement for of divisional status or merger with Kashmir Division again increased after rumours of second bifurcation of J&K and demand for a separate state of Jammu.The majority of people in Pir Panjal are ethnic Paharis & Gujjars and are more connected to their Kashmir Valley brethren by religion, culture, connectivity, geography & historical links with Kashmir.

There is a common reason for this demand. People allege negligence in terms of developmental issues by the government if the Pir Panjal remains linked to the Jammu division.

=== Hill Development Council ===
In 1996, Dr. Farooq Abdullah as Chief minister promised administrative autonomy to Chenab & Pir Panjal.

== See also ==
- Chenab Valley (region)
- Panun Kashmir
- Duggar (region)
