= Khrew =

Khrew Khrew
- City
- Location in Jammu and Kashmir, India Khrew (India)
- Coordinates: 34.02°N 74.99°E
- Country: India
- Union Territory: Jammu and Kashmir
- District: Pulwama

Area
  - Total: 12 km^{2} (4.6 sq mi)
- Elevation: 1,607 m (5,272 ft)

Population (2011)
  - Total: 9,857
  - Density: 820/km^{2} (2,100/sq mi)

Languages
  - Official: Kashmiri, Urdu, Hindi, Dogri, English
- Time zone: UTC+5:30 (IST)
- PIN: 191103
- Telephone code: 01933
- Vehicle registration: JK 13
- Literacy: 42%
- Website: www.khrew.com

Khrew is a town under municipal committee in Pulwama district in the Indian union territory of Jammu and Kashmir. It comes under Tehsil Pampore and District Pulwama of Union Territory of J&K. It is located at a distance of 20.3 km from Lal Chowk, Srinagar. It is famous for many things like a cement manufacturing hub where thousands of cement trucks are sent across the valley. It is also famous for the Indian army training camp where most of the new joined soldiers get training and are sent to different places after the training is over. It is also famous for the education system having two higher secondary schools and many private schools. It is also famous for different religious places like Saint Sabir shah, Saint Syed shah Mantaqee, baba Qasim, and Jwala Mukhi Temple situated on the hilltop.

== Geography ==
Khrew is located at 34.020°N 74.99°E. It has an average elevation of 1,607 metres (5,272 feet) and is located in the Kashmir valley. The area starts from Babapora to Seer Bagh and from Bathen to Androosa. Also, the foot region is extended to Ladhoo, a village in Jammu and Kashmir.

As of 2014 India census, Khrew had a population of 18,411. Males constitute 52% of the population and females 48%. Khrew has an average literacy rate of 42%, lower than the national average of 65.8%; male literacy is 22.08%, and female literacy is 20.00%. In Khrew, 17% of the population is under 15 years of age.

== Climate ==
[hide]Climate data for Khrew (Khreuh)
Month	Jan	Feb	Mar	Apr	May	Jun	Jul	Aug	Sep	Oct	Nov	Dec	Year
Average high °C	8.3	14.9	20.2	22.6	24.0	28.3	36.9	32.4	28.4	24.8	18.7	16.7	20.95
Daily mean °C	6	10	16	18	20	23	26	28	25	22	17	12.9	18.65
Average low °C	-4	1	10	12	16	19	22	21	20	18	12	2	12.41
Average precipitation mm (inches)	180	6	87	106	80	37	20	51	15	30	30	40	56.83
Average rainy days	11	4	6	14	10	5	3	3	4	6	2	4	6
Mean daily sunshine hours	2	4	6	7	9	11	11	10	08	8	7	7	7.5
Source #1: Khrew IT VRUGlobal Meteorological Department (1901-2017)
Source #2: Climate-Data.org for mean temperatures, altitude: 2214m, Weather2Travel for sunshine and rainy days

== Religion ==
Religion in Khrew (2011)
1. Islam (98.9%)
2. Hinduism (0.79%)
3. Sikhism (0.03%)
4. Christianity (0.13%)
5. Buddhism (0.01%)
6. Other (0.03%)
7. Not Stated (0.14%)

Khrew is a majority-Muslim area with 98% of people practicing Islam and the rest practice Hinduism and Sikhism.

== Health ==
Khrew contains one government hospital with approx 6 beds. This hospital provides basic healthcare facilities to its patients.

At present 6 cement factories are operating in the area, which although are a major source of employment for locals have led to a lot of pollution in the area. Kashmir Cement Project established the first cement factory in the region. Six cement plants include government-sponsored JK cement, TCI Max, HK cement, Cemtac, ARCO, ICC cement. Hundreds of trucks also pass in and out of these plants every day to transport raw material and manufactured cement bags. According to the report from the World Health Organization, Khrew has a more death rate than any other town in the district due to the emission of poisonous gases. Factories release 100,000 kilograms of toxic fumes, poisonous gases, and life-threatening elements in the air per day. Lung disease is the primary cause of fume-related fatalities, followed by kidney failure and heart diseases. The release of the poisonous gases was found to be the responsible factor for these conditions, according to the report. The report also suggested that pollution control should intervene and check on a monthly basis whether the pollution control devices in the factories are functioning properly. Khrew has a majority of the population who have directly or indirectly lung or another pulmonary disease.

== Holy places ==
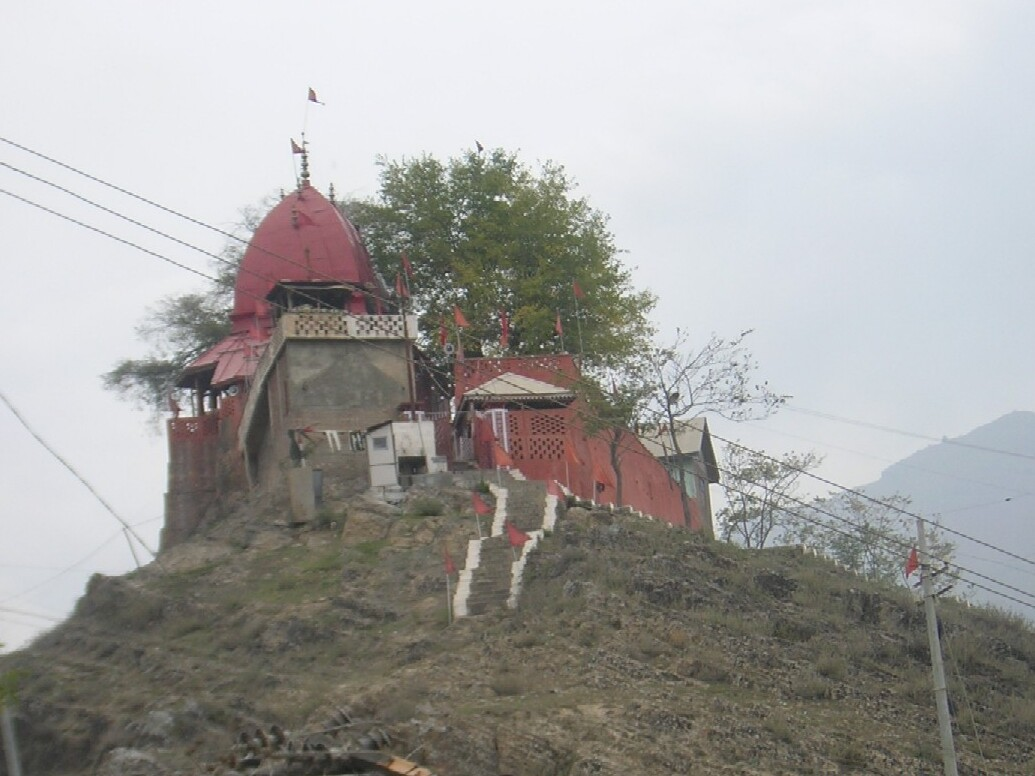
Temple at Khrew

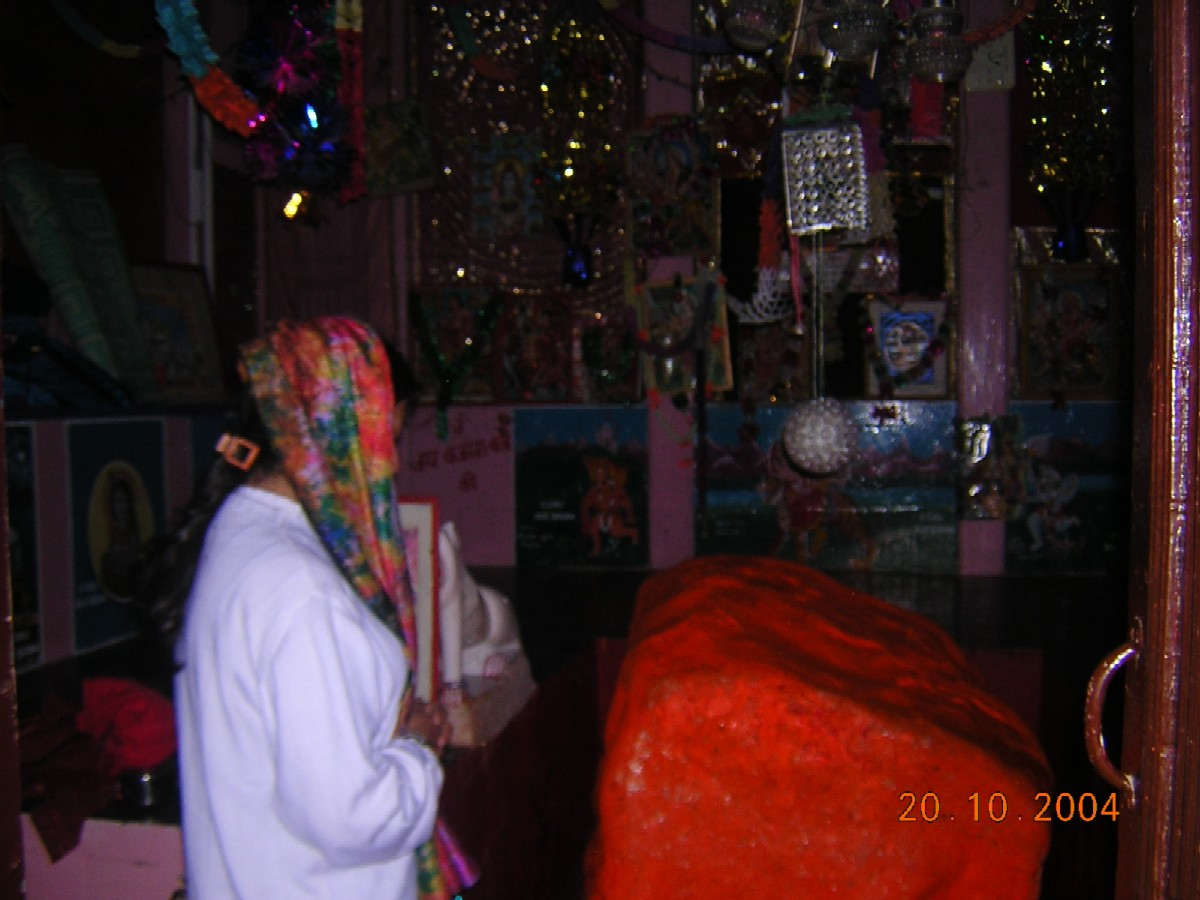
Praying to Jawala Bhagwati

Khrew is also famous for an important temple of Kashmiri Hindus. It is a temple which is dedicated to Jawala Bhagwati - the Goddess of fire. In December 2014 this temple caught fire due to short-circuiting. Now it is renovated in new design. The old wooden structure is now changed to iron and steel The temple is reached by a flight of stone steps. Mela Jawala Mukhi is held here annually on the 14th day of the bright fortnight of Savan (July–August) when pilgrims visit this shrine from all corners of the country. At the bottom of the hillock is a spring where people take a dip before making the ascent.
