= Mansar Lake =

Lake in India

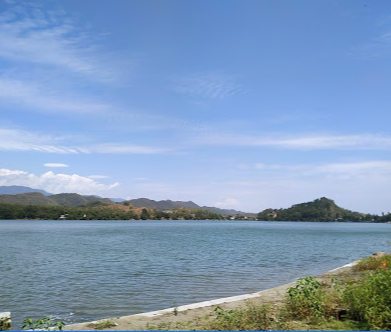
- View of Mansar Lake in Samba district (J&K)

- Location within Jammu and Kashmir
- Location: Mansar, Samba district, Jammu and Kashmir
- Coordinates: 32.6961°N 75.1468°E
- Basin countries: India
- Max. width: 645 metres (2,116 ft)
- Surface area: 590,000 m^{2} (6,400,000 sq ft)
- Average depth: 38 metres (125 ft)
- Max. depth: 38.25 metres (125.5 ft)
- Water volume: 12.37 million cubic metres (437×10^{6} cu ft)

Ramsar Wetland
- Official name: Surinsar-Mansar Lakes
- Designated: 8 November 2005
- Reference no.: 1573

Mansar Lake is a lake located in Mansar in the Samba district in the Indian union territory of Jammu and Kashmir. It is located 19 km from Samba town & 62 km (39 mi) from the city of Jammu. It is fringed by forest-covered hills, and is over a mile (1.6 km) in length and half a mile (0.80 km) in width. Surinsar-Mansar Lakes were designated as Ramsar Convention sites in November 2005. Mansar is primarily fed by surface run-off and partially by mineralised water through paddy fields. The lake supports CITES and IUCN red-listed Lissemys punctuata, Aspideretes gangeticus, and Mansariella lacustris. The composite lake is high in micro nutrients for which makes it an attractive habitat, breeding and nursery ground for migratory waterfowl like Fulica atra, Gallinula chloropus, Podiceps nigricollis, Aythya fuligula, and various Anas species.

== About ==
Besides being a popular excursion destination in Jammu, it is also a holy site, sharing the legend and sanctity of Lake Manasarovar. On the Eastern Bank of the Lake, there is a shrine to Shesha (the serpent mount of Vishnu). The shrine comprises a big boulder on which are placed several iron chains, perhaps representing the small serpents waiting on the tutelary deity of Shesha. Two ancient temples of Shiva, Narasimha, as well as a temple of Durga, are situated in the vicinity of the Mansar Lake. People take a holy dip in the water of the lake on festive occasions.

Newlyweds consider it auspicious to perform three circumambulations (parikrama) around the lake to seek the blessings of Shesha, the lord of serpents, whose shrine is located on its eastern bank.

Certain communities of Hindus perform the mundana ceremony (First haircut) of their male children here.

There are also some ancient temples on the lake's shores, which are visited by devotees in large numbers. Mansar is also ideal for boating for which the Tourism Department provides adequate facilities.

This Mansar lake road joins another important road that directly links Pathankot (Punjab) to Udhampur (Jammu & Kashmir, Jammu Province. Udhampur is a Town of strategic importance, again on National Highway No. 1A. The shortcut road from Mansar or Samba to Udhampur by-passes the Jammu town. Surinsar Lake, a smaller lake that is linked to Mansar, is 24 km (15 mi) from Jammu (via a bypass road).

== Flora and fauna ==
The areas around Mansar Lake are rich in forests. Many types of trees, such as Scrub, Peepal, and Acacia, are found here. The lake is bordered by Pine trees and provides shelter to several birds and animals. There is also a wildlife sanctuary near the lake which provides a home to several Birds and Animals such as Spotted Deer, Nilgai, Cranes, and Ducks. Many types of fish and Tortoises are also found in the Lake. Some types of Snakes are also found in the lake.

== Legend ==
According to local tradition based on the Mahabharata, Babruvahana, the son of Arjuna and Chitrangada , was the ruler of this area during that time. After the war, Arjuna performed a ritual called the ashvamedha yajna to prove his mettle and vantage over the land. Babruvahana captured the horse, which was the power symbol of the yajna, at Khoon village near Dhar Udhampur road, where later on Babruvahana killed Arjuna. After the victory, Babruvahana shared his success with his mother by presenting the head of Arjuna to her. After knowing that Arjuna was his father, Babruvahana wanted to get Arjuna back. Therefore, he had to procure Mani from Shesha. For that, Babruvahana made a tunnel with his arrow, which was known as Surangsar. After defeating Shesha and capturing the mani, he came out of Manisar (Mansar), which was the other end of the tunnel.

== Gallery ==
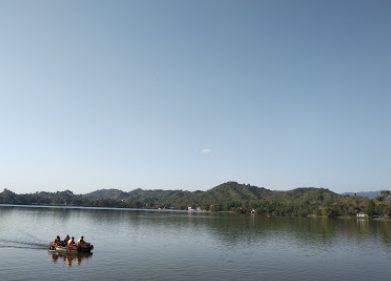
Boating in Mansar Lake

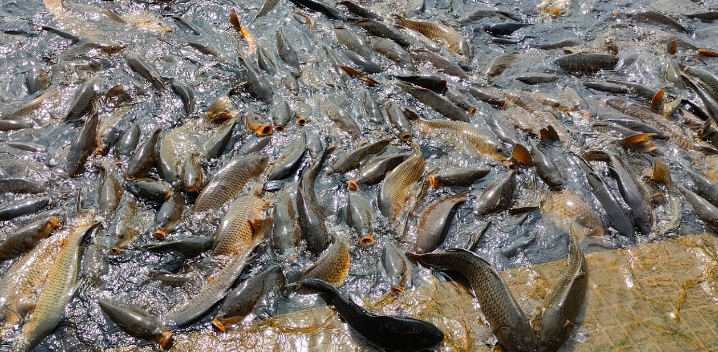
Mansar Lake fishes

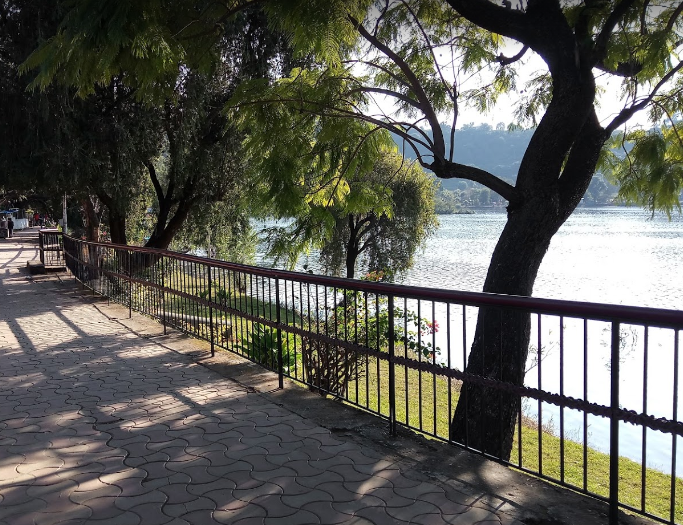
Mansar Lake footpath

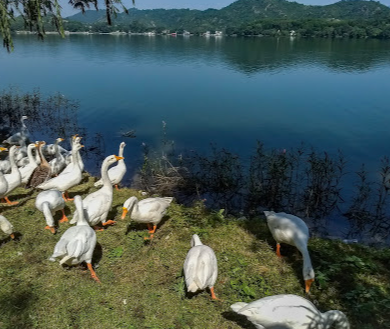
Ducks near the Mansar Lake
