= Dogra =

Dogra, Dogras or Dogri may refer to:

- Dogras or Dogra people, an Indo-Aryan people from the Duggar region of Jammu and Kashmir, India
  - Dogra Jheer, a Hindu community found in Jammu and Kashmir, India
  - Dogra Muslims, a community found in Jammu and Kashmir, India
- Dogri language, a language spoken by the Dogras
  - Dogra (Unicode block), a unicode character block used for the Dogri script
  - Dogri script or Dogra Akkhar, writing system used for writing the Dogri language
- Dogra dynasty, a Hindu dynasty of Kashmir

== Institutions ==
- Dogra Art Museum, Jammu, an art museum in Kashmir
- Dogra Law College, a law college in Jammu and Kashmir

== Other uses ==
- Dogra mac Dúnadach (died 1027), King of Síol Anmchadha
- Dogra Regiment, an infantry regiment of the Indian Army

== See also ==
- Dogra, another name for the Dogar, a Punjabi community of Pakistan
- Dograi, a village near Lahore, Punjab, Pakistan, site of the battle of Dograi during the Indo-Pakistani War of 1965
- Dogar (disambiguation)
- Duggar (disambiguation)
