= Dugger =

Dugger is a surname. Notable people with the surname include:

- Andrew N. Dugger (1886–1975), American religious leader
- Celia W. Dugger (born 1958), American journalist and science editor
- Dean Dugger (1933–2000), American college football player
- Dorothy Dugger, first female manager of the San Francisco Bay Area Rapid Transit (2007–2011)
- Doug Dugger (1926–2005), American country music singer
- Edward Dugger (1894–1939), African-American lieutenant colonel
- Jack Dugger (1923–1988), American National Football League and National Basketball League player
- Jaden Dugger (born 2004), American football player
- Jegil Dugger (born 1979), American football player
- Kyle Dugger (born 1996), American National Football League player
- Richard L. Dugger (1943–2015), Secretary of the Florida Department of Corrections from 1987 to 1991
- Robert Dugger (born 1995), American baseball player
- Ronnie Dugger (1930–2025), American progressive journalist
- Russ Dugger (born 1975), American stock car racing driver
- Tom J. Dugger (1948–2026), American politician from Oklahoma
- William Dugger (fl. 1870s), American politician from Arkansas

== See also ==
- Duggar (disambiguation)
- Düğer, Burdur, Turkey, a village
