= Dogar (disambiguation) =

Dogar, Do Gar, Dowgar, or Duger (Persian: دوگر) may refer to:

== Places ==
- Dowgar, Ardabil, a village in Ardabil Province, Iran
- Dogar, Ilam, a village in Ilam Province, Iran
- Düğer, Burdur, a village in Burdur Province, Turkey

== Other uses ==
- Dogar, a Punjabi clan
- Abdul Hameed Dogar (born 1944), Pakistani jurist
- Mukhtar Ahmad Dogar (1922–2004), Pakistan Air Force bomber pilot and aerial warfare specialist
- Irfan Dogar (born 1973), Pakistani politician

== See also ==
- Dogra (disambiguation)
- Duggar (disambiguation)
