= Andrew N. Dugger =

American minister and missionary (1886–1975)

Andrew Nugent Dugger
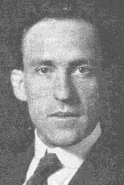

Personal life
- Born: November 19, 1886 Bassett, Nebraska, United States
- Died: November 2, 1975 (aged 88) Jerusalem, Israel
- Spouse: Effie Carpenter
- Children: 8

Religious life
- Religion: Christianity

President of the General Conference of the Church of God (Seventh Day)
- In office 1921–1927
- Preceded by: S. W. Mentzer
- Succeeded by: Burt Marrs

Andrew Nugent Dugger (Bassett, Nebraska, November 19, 1886 – Jerusalem, Israel, November 2, 1975), was a prominent religious minister and Sabbatarian missionary in the 20th century. He was president of the General Conference of the Church of God (Seventh Day) in the United States during the periods 1921–1927 and 1929–1931. He is also considered the founder of the Unitarian movement "Churches of God 7th Day of Mount Zion", a group of congregations that followed Dugger's leadership and influence to Jerusalem when it broke away from the General Conference of the Church of God (Seventh Day).

== Early years ==
Andrew Nugent Dugger was the son of Alexander F. Dugger, a minister of the Church of God (Seventh Day) from 1874 until his death in 1910, who was also the first vice president of the General Conference of the Church of God (Seventh Day) when the state Conferences were unified into a single organization on October 5, 1884. Andrew N. Dugger was a farmer and schoolteacher in 1910, however he was involved in church ministry affairs as early as 1906.

Later Andrew N. Dugger followed in his father's footsteps and dedicated himself to a career as a religious minister within the Church of God (Seventh Day); for this to happen, Dugger had to sell his farm and go to the University of Chicago, where he learned theology and oratory, and mastered Biblical Greek, Biblical Hebrew, and German. In 1925 he married Effie Carpenter and they had five children, John Paul Dugger, Charles Andrew Dugger, Orabelle Dugger, Naomi Dugger, and Mary Dugger.

== Career as minister ==
=== Publisher of The Bible Advocate ===
After graduation, he was invited by the authorities of the Church of God (Seventh Day) to change his address to Stanberry, Missouri, where the offices of this organization would be, this action for Andrew N. Dugger to serve as editor of The Bible Advocate magazine, a position he held for 18 years from 1914 (the year World War I also began), as well as the Presidency of the General Conference of the Church of God (Seventh Day) in the United States in 1921.

In 1914, Dugger permanently closed the open forum of The Bible Advocate magazine, ending a long tradition within the Church of God (Seventh Day) that allowed members to exchange opinions and make doctrinal proposals, the reason given by Andrew N. Dugger was that "the diversity of ideas endangered doctrinal uniformity."

In 1917, the General Conference of the Church of God in Stanberry, Missouri received the minimum amount of $1,000, so Andrew N. Dugger felt that the organization would have financial problems. He organized a review to follow up on the destination of local tithes. Realizing that in many cases they were collected by local ministers, he created a policy in which all tithes would be given to the state Conferences, and the tithe of the tithes collected would be sent from the state conferences to the General Conference in Missouri.

In 1924, Andrew N. Dugger established the Christology of the Church of God (Seventh Day) through an article that promoted Arianism. According to Robert Coulter (minister), Christology would not be discussed again until 1980, when the Church of God (Seventh Day) integrated the divinity of Jesus Christ into their beliefs.

During those years a famous debate took place between Andrew N. Dugger and W. Curtis Porter regarding the religious role of the Sabbath in Christianity; this debate would be published in a book of theology called Porter–Dugger Debate, republished in 2014 by Guardian Of Truth Found.

=== Presidency in the Church of God (Seventh Day) ===
Historian and minister Robert Coulter has pointed out that during Dugger's presidency of the General Conference of the Church of God (Seventh Day) in the United States (two terms comprising 1921–1927 and 1929–1931), Andrew Dugger tried to achieve institutional unity through decree and not dialogue. Coulter also mentions that during his presidency, Dugger used the theological diversity within the Church of God as an excuse to divide the organization and later establish the Salem Conference, a temporary division that occurred in 1933.

During his presidency of the American church, Andrew N. Dugger ordered the installation of the organization's first printing press in Mexico, due to requests for literature that had been made from different Mexican cities. The printing press was installed in 1923. In that same year he attended, as president of the American church, the "First General Convention of the Church of God" in the Mexican city of Saltillo, Coahuila where the first president of the nascent Mexican Conference, José María Rodríguez, was appointed.

In 1921, through a series of debates held in Canada and the United States, Dugger's performance led to the conversion of T. J. Marrs and his sons Burt Marrs and Mitchell Marrs, who in later years would be prominent ministers and leaders of the General Conference.

==== Dugger and Milton Grotz's Pentecostalism ====
In 1923, evangelists of Pentecostal origin such as Milton Grotz joined the Church of God (Seventh Day), Grotz was a preacher who supported and spread the prohibition against the consumption of pork, the prohibition of tobacco, and was also a preacher who believed in healing the sick through "revival" meetings. In that year, Andrew N. Dugger reports the following regarding Milton Grotz:

Stanberry has been stirred by the power of God during the past week as never before in her history.... we are living in the days of the Latter Rain.... The Church house, although large, will hardly accommodate the crowds. Brother Grotz is a minister of the Church of God.... We hope that God will pour out His Spirit on more of our ministers and our people....

On October 31, 1923, Dugger and Grotz went to Bassett, Nebraska, the hometown of Andrew N. Dugger. According to his reports, miraculous healings were reported, as well as the conversion of Dugger's wife's family. In 1924, Milton Grotz and Dugger had doctrinal differences regarding the role of Pentecostalism in the Church of God (Seventh Day) and Dugger's opposition to accepting the doctrine of salvation by grace, which culminated in Grotz's departure from the Church of God.

=== Influence of British Israelism ===
In the early 1930s, the controversial preacher Herbert W. Armstrong, creator of British Israelism and promoter of the celebration of the Leviticus 23 festivals in Christianity, was a member of the Church of God (Seventh Day), during the temporary split in 1933 that would form the Salem Conference of the Church of God (Seventh Day), Armstrong sided with the Salem group and Andrew N. Dugger. Regarding the formulation of the doctrine of British Israelism, Herbert Armstrong mentions in his autobiography a letter received from Andrew N. Dugger responding to a request for publication:

"Dear Brother Armstrong:

I... have just finished the manuscript on the Third Angel's Message and British Israel... You have put much work on this and I am impressed to write you now while the matter is fresh on my mind of how it has interested me. I have seen no work near its equal in clearness and completeness. You surely are right, and while I cannot use it in the paper at the present you may be assured that your labor has surely not been in vane[sic]. There is a purpose in your having gone into this matter so deeply right at this time... May the Lord bless you..."'

This coincidence is not due to Armstrong's teaching Andrew N. Dugger, but rather that both were influenced by Clarence Orvil Dodd (with whom Dugger even wrote A History of The True Church. Dugger was primarily interested in the work of prophecy and the relationship between the Church and Israel that Clarence Orvil Dodd preached, while Armstrong was interested in Dodd's explicit British Israelism, who in turn learned it from Greenberry G. Rupert, along with the teaching of keeping the Jewish holidays of Leviticus 23. Years later, Clarence O. Dodd would break away from the Church of God (Seventh Day) and currently considers himself a founder of the Sacred Name Movement.

=== The division of 1933 ===
One of the points that caused controversy within the religious organization was Dugger's opinion on the need to move the church headquarters to Jerusalem, Israel. During The division of 1933 of the Church of God (Seventh Day) in the United States, Andrew Dugger and a group of ministers who agreed with him moved to propose the transfer of the headquarters to Jerusalem, on November 4, 1933, they agreed that the reorganization of the church would take place in Salem, West Virginia, in opposition to the continuity of the General Conference of the Church of God (Seventh Day) led by Burt F. Marrs in Stanberry, Missouri.

Andrew N. Dugger was part of the Split Conference in Salem, but never took a leadership position in the group of The Twelve (apostolic leadership system that this group installed).

==== The church in Mexico ====
During the years of the division, Andrew N. Dugger influenced the appointment of missionaries of the Church to Mexico, thus propagating the orientation of the Salem Division Conference in the Mexican Republic, according to the ethnographer Raphael Patai, when researching in 1930 about the presence of crypto-Jews in the Church of God (Seventh Day) in Mexico City, he found religious pamphlets that talked about a headquarters in Jerusalem:

The paragraph dealing with the constitution of the sect on page 5 states that the Church of God has headquarters in 'Jerusalem, Palestine'."

During the 1930s, after the creation of the Conference in Salem, one of the missionaries in Mexico closest to Andrew N. Dugger was Ezequías Campos, who in 1937 introduced the celebration of the Feasts of Leviticus 23 to the Church of God (Seventh Day) in Mexico and later became the founder of the Church of God (Israelite) when the Mexican Conference abolished the celebration of the holidays.

=== Opposition to the 1949 reunification ===
During the reunification of the Salem group and the Stanberry group, the General Conference of the Church of God (Seventh Day) became one organization again. Dugger stood against this process during the time of talks. In 1949, Andrew N. Dugger was succeeded by Burt F. Marrs as head of the Department of Foreign Missions in the religious organization.

Andrew N. Dugger and others organized the movement "Come Back to Salem". This movement had three aspects: 1. A minority that returned to Salem to establish a headquarters with those who followed them, 2. Andrew N. Dugger and Severson who left for Jerusalem, 3. Olson and Groshans, who formed the Seventh Day Church of God in Caldwell, Idaho.

==== Dispute for the Mexican Conference ====
Before leaving for Jerusalem, Dugger was part of this anti-reunification group in Salem. In 1950, Dugger traveled to Mexico during the Mexican Church of God (Seventh Day) presidency of José Kim Peck. Due to Dugger's earlier contact with the Mexican Conference of the Church of God (Seventh Day), he tried to bring them toward the recognition of the dissident organization that opposed reunification (Salem) in the United States, however, the various trips to Mexico were counteracted by Burt F. Marrs, who made his own trips to visit the Mexican Conference and replaced the literature of Dugger.

=== Move to Jerusalem ===
In 1952, after a long trip to Nigeria while visiting groups of the Church of God in that place, he decided to move to Jerusalem with his wife.

In 1953, Andrew N. Dugger and his wife Effie Carpenter moved permanently to Jerusalem and began the publication Mt. Zion Reporter. Dugger through his publication Mt. Zion Reporter had a connection with different groups that called themselves Mount Zion Church of God (Seventh Day) and that recognized the headquarters in Jerusalem, these congregations are found in different parts of the world, from some African countries to North America, derived from Dugger's missionary activity.

In 2012, Gil Monrose, pastor of an African-American Mt. Zion congregation in New York, led a project called the Andrew N. Dugger Republishing Project, to share the documented material on Twitter.

== Death ==
Andrew N. Dugger died in 1975 at the age of 89. His son-in-law Gordon Fauth continued the work of the Mt. Zion Reporter.

== Publications ==
- The Bible Home Instructor, Eighth Edition, Editor Kerry L. Barger, 2018.
- A History of The True Church, co-authored with C. O. Dodd, United States, 1936.
