= G. G. Rupert =

American evangelist and author

Greenberry George Rupert
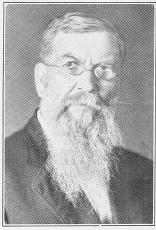
- Born: May 12, 1847; Ohio, U.S.
- Died: July 17, 1922 (aged 75); Oklahoma City, OK
- Occupations: Evangelist author
- Known for: Evangelism
- Title: Pastor of the Independent Church of God
- Successor: John S. Stanford
- Children: Harry. W. Rupert, Eva Josephine Rupert Pennington, Lucile Rupert Smith, Lauretta Rupert Pennington, Ruth Rupert Bulla
- Relatives: daughter-in-law: Birdie Stuart Rupert Sultz. She married one of his successors, Ivel Sultz, in 1957.

Greenberry George Rupert (1847–1922), generally known as G. G. Rupert, was an American Adventist pastor and writer associated with British Israelism and Dispensationalism. He published a number of books which attempted to interpret history from a biblical literalist and millenarian perspective. Rupert's theories were a seminal influence on the 20th-century evangelist Herbert W. Armstrong. His religious ideology was linked to a theory that the Last Days would see a power struggle between the "Orient" and the "Occident", a view that helped to fuel the Yellow Peril panic.

== Life ==
Born in Ohio, Rupert was initially a Methodist, but later joined the Seventh-day Adventists, becoming a minister for a number of years. He then formed the "Independent Church of God", which was loosely associated with the Adventist Church of God. Based in Britton, near Oklahoma City, from 1917 he published the journal Remnant of Israel, setting forth his views.

Rupert became the head of a number of churches, with generally small followings. These continued to function for a few years after his death led by his close associate John S. Stanford and Rupert's own son and daughter.

== Theories ==
=== Religious doctrines ===
Rupert believed that the New Testament had not superseded the rules laid out in the Old Testament, and so the laws of Moses should apply to Christians as well as Jews, including kosher diets and other practices. Adapting the Adventist view of Seven church eras, Rupert argued that the "Philadelphia" phase was the period in which William Miller worked (from 1833 to 1844). The final era, "Laodicea" began in 1844 and would last until the End Times. He also denied the immortality of the soul, asserting that man is mortal, but can be given eternal life. Traditional Christian holidays were in fact "heathen":

Sunday ... Easter, Christmas, Good Friday, Ash Wednesday, and various days ... are all of heathen origin and belong to Babylon, the mother of harlots. The majority of teachers know this, but for various reasons they will still try to keep the people in ignorance and support the old system of Babylon.

Rupert's theories were later influential on Herbert W. Armstrong, who adopted many of his ideas about church eras and Jewish holy day observance, along with his British Israelist genealogies of western peoples. Clarence Orvil Dodd introduced Armstrong to Rupert's ideas.

=== Yellow Peril ===
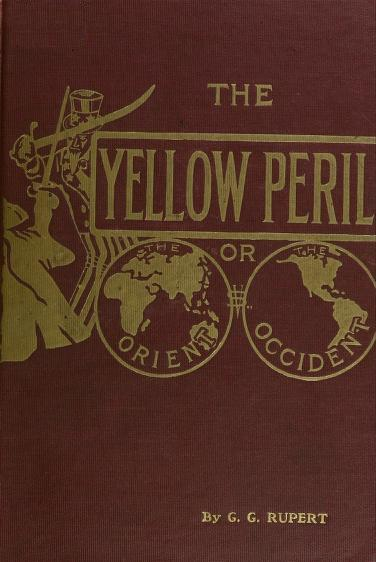
Cover of the third edition of Rupert's The Yellow Peril

Rupert was influential in the development of the idea of the Yellow Peril, the theory that East Asians (the "yellow races") were a present and future threat to the west. These views were published in The Yellow Peril, or the Orient vs. the Occident as viewed by modern statesmen and ancient prophets (1911). Rupert included Russia among the "oriental" races, which, he believed, would eventually invade America. According to Rupert the reference to "the kings from the East" in the Book of Revelation 16:12, was a prediction of this event. He believed that Russia would take control of China and Africa; this combined force would then try to overwhelm the West. He claimed that China, India, Japan and Korea were already undermining England and the U.S., but that Jesus Christ would stop them. The final victory of the Occident over the Orient would confirm biblical prophesies — as interpreted by Rupert.

In later editions, Rupert adapted his theory to accommodate world events. In the third edition, published after the Russian Revolution, Rupert identified the rise of Bolshevism and the expansion of communism as the beginning of a process that would lead to the fulfilment of his predictions.

== Publications ==
- The Yellow Peril, or the Orient vs. the Occident as viewed by modern statesmen and ancient prophets. (530 pages).
- The Inspired History of the Nations (3 volumes, 750 pages)
- Time, Tradition and Truth
- The Bible Atlas
- The Inspired Biblical Ecclesiastical and Secular History of the World (6 volumes/parts, 2500 pages)
- "The Two Covenants, the Old and the New, Between God and Man" (65 pages)
- "The Four Great Cycles" (36 pages)
- "Peace or War"
- "The Call of the Ministry and Their Support"
- "The Two Women of the 12th and 17th Chapters of Revelation"
- "The Story of the Jew and the Remnant of Judah"
- "Consecutive Events in Their Order Following the Close of Probation"
- "The Book of the Law Found Again"
- "The Gift of Tongues Examined"
- "A Positive Appeal and Challenge to Seventh-Day Adventists and Others To Cease Teaching Error"
- "Is There a True Church Organization?"

== See also ==
- Alexander Hislop
