= Clarence Orvil Dodd =

Clarence Orohrelle Dodd
- Born: February 5, 1899
- Died: December 25, 1955 (aged 56)
- Occupations: Author, Church Elder
- Writing career
- Genre: Adventist Christian thought

Clarence Orohrelle Dodd (February 5, 1899 – December 25, 1955), often known as Clarence Orvil Dodd and C. O. Dodd, was an American author and magazine editor and an elder of a particular Church of God (Seventh Day) denomination church in Salem, West Virginia, in the early 20th century.

In 1920 he married Martha I. Richmond, whom he predeceased. They had five children, four boys (Clebert, Robert, William, and Paul) and one daughter, Mary, now Mary Dodd Ling.

He worked as a clerk for 35 years for Hope Natural Gas Company (now absorbed into ExxonMobil) while writing, editing and publishing his magazine, and serving his church, until he retired early due to Hodgkins' disease. Two years subsequent to his retirement he died.

== Influence ==
In 1937 Dodd founded The Faith magazine, where he served as editor for many years. Initially the primary focus of The Faith was advocating for observation of Jewish holy festivals on the part of its Christian readers but in the early 1940s Dodd took up the sacred name cause as well. In The Encyclopedia of American Religions scholar of American religions J. Gordon Melton wrote of the magazine, "No single force in spreading the Sacred Name movement was as important as The Faith magazine."

Andrew N. Dugger (November 19, 1886 – November 2, 1975), fellow church Elder of Dodd's and one-time editor of the long-running Adventist magazine Bible Advocate, co-authored a book with Dodd valued in many parts of the Adventist community, A History of the True Church. Melton says that Dugger accepted the same basic theology as Dodd. One writer considers Dugger to be the most famous Church of God (Adventist) leader in the 20th century.

Mildred Kelvig, a lifelong acquaintance who had served for many years as his personal secretary, claimed that Dodd's acquaintance with Worldwide Church of God founder Herbert W. Armstrong influenced the latter's views. She specified that Dodd convinced Armstrong of Greenberry G. Rupert's (May 12, 1848 – July 17, 1922, author of The Yellow Peril) assertions that observing Hebrew holidays is mandatory for a Christian.

== Works ==
- Dugger, Andrew Nugent; Dodd, Clarence Orvil (1936). A History of the True Church. Salem, West Virginia: The Bible Advocate. OCLC 3211625. Archived from the original on October 17, 2008.
