= Duggar =

Duggar may refer to:

- Duggar (region), a cultural and historical region in South Asia
- Duggar family, stars of the reality TV series 19 Kids and Counting
  - Jim Bob Duggar, father of the Duggar family and former Arkansas state legislator
  - Josh Duggar, son of Jim Bob Duggar and convicted criminal
  - Jana Duggar Wissmann, daughter of Jim Bob Duggar
  - Jill Duggar Dillard, daughter of Jim Bob Duggar
  - Jessa Duggar Seewald, daughter of Jim Bob Duggar
  - Jinger Duggar Vuolo, daughter of Jim Bob Duggar
- Benjamin Minge Duggar (1872–1956), American botanist
- Steven Duggar (born 1993), American major league baseball player

== See also ==
- Dugger (disambiguation)
- Dogra (disambiguation)
- Dogar (disambiguation)
