= Dogri script =

Abugida for the Dogri language

Dogri script 𑠝𑠢𑠳𑠷 𑠖𑠵𑠌𑠤𑠬 𑠀𑠊𑠹𑠋𑠤 namēṁ ḍōgarā akkhara
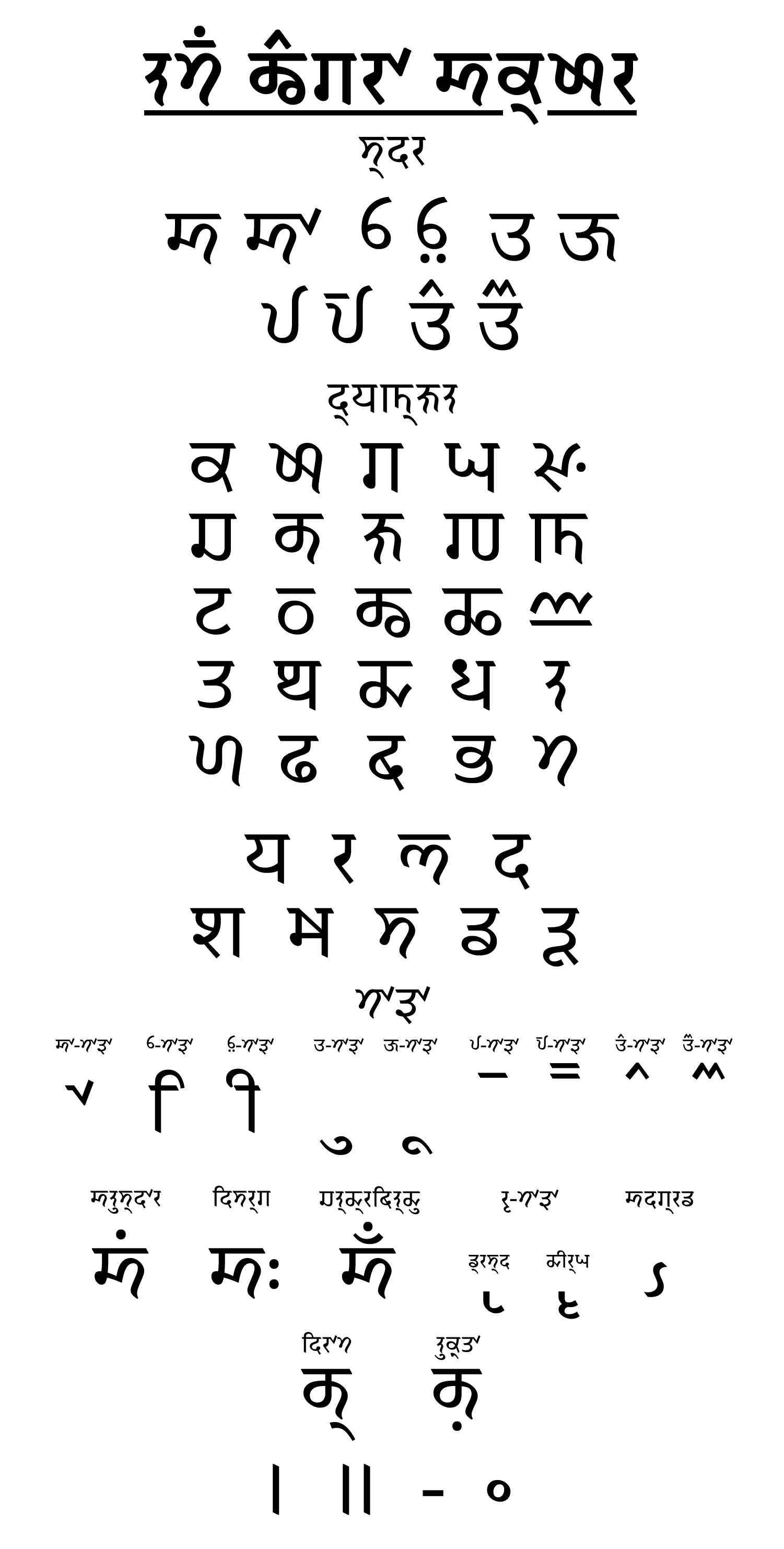
- Dogri Varnamala (Alphabet Chart) divided into 10 vowels (𑠩𑠹𑠦𑠤), 34 consonants (𑠦𑠹𑠣𑠓𑠹𑠑𑠝), 9 Vowel diacritics (𑠢𑠬𑠙𑠹𑠤𑠬), 6 Sanskrit origin marks, 2 consonant modifiers and 4 punctuation marks
- Script type: Abugida
- Direction: Left-to-right
- Region: Jammu
- Languages: Dogri

Related scripts
- Parent systems: Proto-Sinaitic alphabet: Phoenician alphabet; Aramaic alphabet (debated); Brāhmī; Gupta; Śāradā; Devashesha; Takri; Dogri script

ISO 15924
- ISO 15924: Dogr (328), Dogra

Unicode
- Unicode alias: Dogra
- Unicode range: U+11800–U+1184F

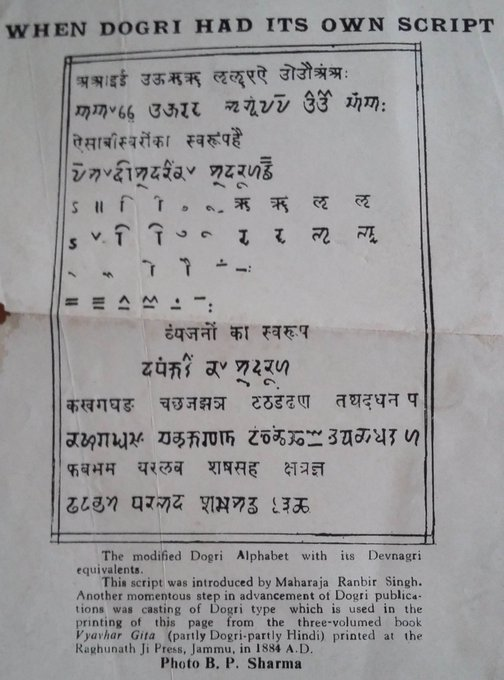
Alphabet table in Dogra script

The Dogri script (Dogri: 𑠝𑠢𑠳𑠷 𑠖𑠵𑠌𑠤𑠬 𑠀𑠊𑠹𑠋𑠤, romanized: namēṁ ḍōgarā akkhara) is a writing system originally used for writing the Dogri language in Jammu and Kashmir in the northern part of the Indian subcontinent.

== History ==
The revival of the Dogra Akkhar script was supported by the order of Maharaja Ranbir Singh of Jammu and Kashmir. It is a modified version of the old Dogra Akkhar script, which in turn was a Jammu variant of the Takri script.

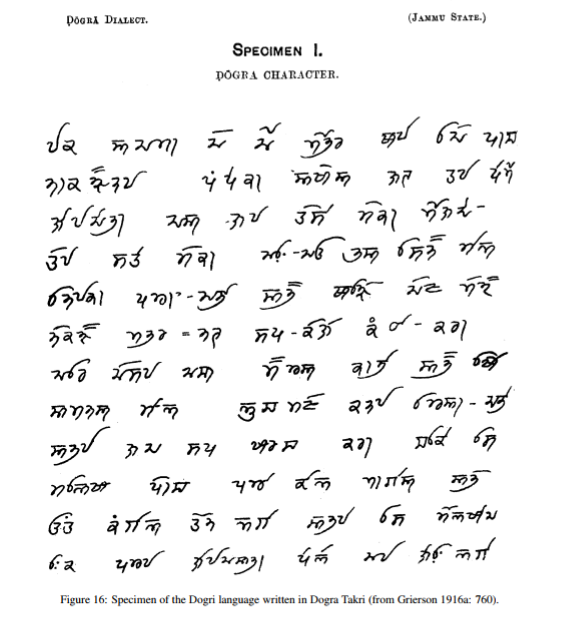
Dogra script specimen

== Efforts of revival ==
Signboards in New Dogra Akkhar were erected at Jammu Tawi railway station. However, the script is functionally extinct, with Devanagari being used to write Dogri now. Most speakers of Dogra are unable to read and write the language in its original script.

== Letters ==
Consonants
𑠊 ka	𑠋 kha	𑠌 ga	𑠍 gha	𑠎 nga
𑠏 ca	𑠐 cha	𑠑 ja	𑠒 jha	𑠓 ñ
𑠔 ṭa	𑠕 ṭha	𑠖 ḍa	𑠗 ḍha	𑠘 ṇa
𑠙 ta	𑠚 tha	𑠛 da	𑠜 dha	𑠝 na
𑠞 pa	𑠟 pha	𑠠 ba	𑠡 bha	𑠢 ma
𑠣 ya	𑠤 ra	𑠥 la	𑠦 va	
𑠧 śa	𑠨 ṣa	𑠩 sa	𑠪 ha	𑠫 ḷa

Vowels
Vowel	a	ā	i	ī	u	ū	r̥	r̥
Independent	𑠀	𑠁	𑠂	𑠃	𑠄	𑠅		
Dependent		𑠬	𑠭	𑠮	𑠯	𑠰	𑠱	𑠲

Vowel	e	ai	o	au
Independent	𑠆	𑠇	𑠈	𑠉
Dependent	𑠳	𑠴	𑠵	𑠶

Signs
𑠷 ṁ	𑠸 ḥ	𑠹 virama	𑠺 nuqta	𑠻 abbr. sign

== Sample text ==
The following text is from Article 1 of the Universal Declaration of Human Rights:

=== Dogra Akkhar script ===
𑠩𑠬𑠤𑠳 𑠢𑠝𑠯𑠊𑠹𑠋 𑠢𑠴𑠪𑠹𑠢𑠬 𑠙𑠳 𑠀𑠜𑠭𑠊𑠬𑠤𑠳𑠷 𑠛𑠳 𑠠𑠭𑠧𑠳 𑠏 𑠑𑠝𑠢𑠴 𑠚𑠢𑠬𑠷 𑠩𑠯𑠙𑠴𑠷𑠙𑠤 𑠙𑠳 𑠠𑠤𑠵𑠠𑠤 𑠝। 𑠄'𑠝𑠳𑠷𑠌𑠮 𑠠𑠯𑠛𑠹𑠜𑠮 𑠙𑠳 𑠑𑠢𑠮𑠤𑠴 𑠛𑠮 𑠛𑠳𑠝 𑠚𑠹𑠪𑠵𑠃 𑠇 𑠙𑠳 𑠄'𑠝𑠳𑠷𑠌𑠮 𑠁𑠞𑠰𑠷-𑠠𑠭𑠏𑠹𑠏𑠳𑠷 𑠡𑠬𑠃𑠏𑠬𑠤𑠳 𑠛𑠳 𑠡𑠬𑠦𑠴 𑠊𑠝𑠹𑠝𑠴 𑠠𑠹𑠣𑠪𑠬𑠤 𑠊𑠤𑠝𑠬 𑠥𑠵𑠫𑠛𑠬 𑠇।

=== Devanagari script ===
सारे मनुक्ख मैह्मा ते अधिकारें दे बिशे च जनमै थमां सुतैंतर ते बरोबर न। उ'नेंगी बुद्धी ते जमीरै दी देन थ्होई ऐ ते उ'नेंगी आपूं-बिच्चें भाईचारे दे भावै कन्नै ब्यहार करना लोड़दा ऐ।

=== Perso-Arabic script ===
سارے منکّھ میہما تے ادھکاریں دے بشے چ جنمے تھماں ستیںتر تے بروبر ن۔ ا'نیںگی بُدھِّی تے جمیرے دی دین تھہوئی اے تے ا'نیںگی آپوں-بچّیں بھائیچارے دے بھاوے کنّے بیہار کرنا لوڑدا اے۔

=== ISO 15919 transliteration ===
Sārē manukkha maihmā tē adhikārēṁ dē biśē ca janmai thamāṁ sutaintar tē barōbar na. U'nēṁgī buddhī tē jamīrai dī dēn thhōī ai tē u'nēṁgī āpūṁ-biccēṁ bhāīcārē dē bhāvai kannai byahār karnā lōṛdā ai.

=== International Phonetic Alphabet (IPA) ===
[saːɾeː mənʊkkʰə mɛ́ːmaː t̪eː əd̪ɪ̀kaːɾẽː d̪eː bɪʃeː t͡ʃə d͡ʒənmɛː t̪ʰəmãː sʊt̪ɛːnt̪əɾ t̪eː bəɾoːbəɾ nə ‖ ʊ́nẽːgiː bʊd̪d̪ìː t̪eː d͡ʒəmiːɾɛː d̪iː d̪eːn t̪ʰòːiː ɛː t̪eː ʊ́nẽːgiː aːpũːbɪt̪t͡ʃẽː pàːiːt͡ʃaːɾeː d̪eː pàːʋɛː kənnɛː bjəàːɾ kəɾnaː loːɽd̪aː ɛː ‖]

=== English translation ===
All human beings are born free and equal in dignity and rights. They are endowed with reason and conscience and should act towards one another in a spirit of brotherhood.

== Unicode ==
Name Dogra Akkhar was added as a Unicode block to the Unicode Standard in June, 2018 (version 11.0).

The Unicode block is named Dogra, at U+11800–U+1184F, and contains 60 characters:

Dogra^{[1]}^{[2]} Official Unicode Consortium code chart (PDF)
	0	1	2	3	4	5	6	7	8	9	A	B	C	D	E	F
U+1180x	𑠀	𑠁	𑠂	𑠃	𑠄	𑠅	𑠆	𑠇	𑠈	𑠉	𑠊	𑠋	𑠌	𑠍	𑠎	𑠏
U+1181x	𑠐	𑠑	𑠒	𑠓	𑠔	𑠕	𑠖	𑠗	𑠘	𑠙	𑠚	𑠛	𑠜	𑠝	𑠞	𑠟
U+1182x	𑠠	𑠡	𑠢	𑠣	𑠤	𑠥	𑠦	𑠧	𑠨	𑠩	𑠪	𑠫	𑠬	𑠭	𑠮	𑠯
U+1183x	𑠰	𑠱	𑠲	𑠳	𑠴	𑠵	𑠶	𑠷	𑠸	𑠹	𑠺	𑠻				
U+1184x																
Notes 1.As of Unicode version 17.0 2.Grey areas indicate non-assigned code points
