= Dogra (Unicode block) =

- Range: U+11800..U+1184F (80 code points)
- Plane: SMP
- Scripts: Dogra
- Major alphabets: Dogra
- Assigned: 60 code points
- Unused: 20 reserved code points

Unicode version history
- 11.0 (2018): 60 (+60)

Unicode documentation
- Code chart ∣ Web page

Dogra is a Unicode block for the Dogri script (also known as Dogra Akkhar script), for writing the Dogri language in Jammu and Kashmir in the northern part of the Indian subcontinent. The Takri script version of Jammu is known as Dogra Akkhar.

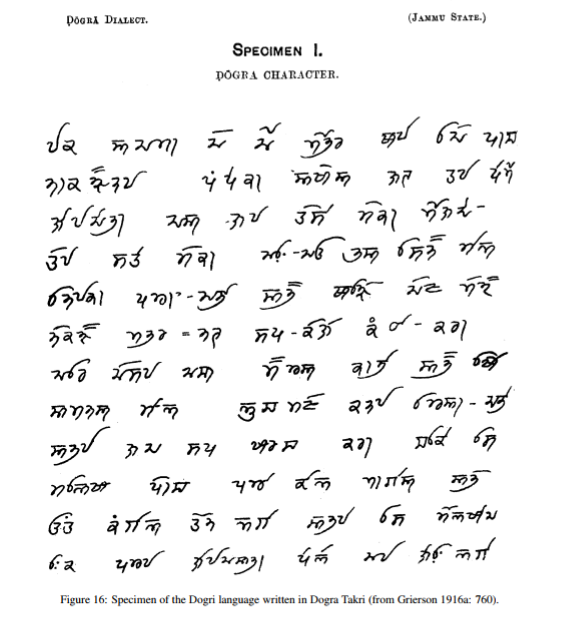
Dogra script specimen

== Unicode ==
The Dogra block was added to Unicode in June, 2018 with the release of version 11.0.

The block is named Dogra, at U+11800–U+1184F, and contains 60 characters:

Dogra^{[1]}^{[2]} Official Unicode Consortium code chart (PDF)
	0	1	2	3	4	5	6	7	8	9	A	B	C	D	E	F
U+1180x	𑠀	𑠁	𑠂	𑠃	𑠄	𑠅	𑠆	𑠇	𑠈	𑠉	𑠊	𑠋	𑠌	𑠍	𑠎	𑠏
U+1181x	𑠐	𑠑	𑠒	𑠓	𑠔	𑠕	𑠖	𑠗	𑠘	𑠙	𑠚	𑠛	𑠜	𑠝	𑠞	𑠟
U+1182x	𑠠	𑠡	𑠢	𑠣	𑠤	𑠥	𑠦	𑠧	𑠨	𑠩	𑠪	𑠫	𑠬	𑠭	𑠮	𑠯
U+1183x	𑠰	𑠱	𑠲	𑠳	𑠴	𑠵	𑠶	𑠷	𑠸	𑠹	𑠺	𑠻				
U+1184x																
Notes: 1. As of Unicode version 16.0; 2. Grey areas indicate non-assigned code points

== History ==
The following Unicode-related documents record the purpose and process of defining specific characters in the Dogra block:

Version	Final code points (Note: Proposed code points and characters names may differ from final code points and names)	Count	L2 ID	WG2 ID	Document
11.0	U+11800..1183B	60	L2/15-213		Pandey, Anshuman (2015-07-30), Preliminary proposal to encode the Dogra script
11.0	U+11800..1183B	60	L2/15-312		Anderson, Deborah; Whistler, Ken; McGowan, Rick; Pournader, Roozbeh; Glass, Andrew; Iancu, Laurențiu (2015-11-01), "1. Dogra", Recommendations to UTC #145 November 2015 on Script Proposals
11.0	U+11800..1183B	60	L2/15-234R		Pandey, Anshuman (2015-11-04), Proposal to encode the Dogra script
11.0	U+11800..1183B	60	L2/15-254		Moore, Lisa (2015-11-16), "D.5", UTC #145 Minutes
11.0	U+11800..1183B	60	L2/17-201	N4862	A, Srinidhi; A, Sridatta (2017-06-25), Proposal to encode the DOGRA VOWEL SIGN VOCALIC RR
11.0	U+11800..1183B	60	L2/17-255		Anderson, Deborah; Whistler, Ken; Pournader, Roozbeh; Moore, Lisa; Liang, Hai (2017-07-28), "16. Dogra", Recommendations to UTC #152 July-August 2017 on Script Proposals
11.0	U+11800..1183B	60	L2/17-222		Moore, Lisa (2017-08-11), "D.14", UTC #152 Minutes
11.0	U+11800..1183B	60		N4953 (pdf, doc)	"M66.04", Unconfirmed minutes of WG 2 meeting 66, 2018-03-23
11.0	U+11800..1183B	60	L2/17-353		Anderson, Deborah; Whistler, Ken (2017-10-02), "C. Dogra", WG2 Consent Docket
11.0	U+11800..1183B	60	L2/17-362		Moore, Lisa (2018-02-02), "Consensus 153-C4", UTC #153 Minutes
