= Doug Dugger =

American singer-songwriter

Lloyd Dugger (1926–May 26, 2005), better known as Doug Dugger, was an American country music singer with a religious style that led him to be dubbed the "Chaplain of Country Music." His hits included "Bummin' Around" and "The Deck of Cards".

As a boy in Missouri, Dugger played banjo and sang. He was discharged from the US Navy in 1946 and moved to Missoula, Montana, where he attended a T. Texas Tyler show at an American Legion post and was invited to play with the band informally. The group then hired him as a bass player.

Dugger toured with Tyler until 1956, when he signed with Top Talent, Inc. and appeared and toured with ABC-TV's Ozark Jubilee. He was the co-host and executive producer of a syndicated weekly radio program, Legends and Legends in the Making, which featured country stars and new talent.

In 2003, the Country Legends Association Hall of Fame inducted him as a "living legend." Dugger died of congestive heart failure at his home in Missoula on May 26, 2005.
