= Dogar, Ilam =

Dogar دوگر
- Village
- Location within Iran
- Coordinates: 33°29′21″N 46°51′12″E
- Country: Iran
- Province: Ilam
- County: Sirvan
- Bakhsh: Central
- Rural District: Rudbar

Population (2006)
  - Total: 47
- Time zone: UTC+3:30 (IRST)
  - Summer (DST): UTC+4:30 (IRDT)

Dogar (Persian: دوگر, also Romanized as Do Gar; also known as Do Gol) is a village in Rudbar Rural District, Sirvan District, Sirvan County, Ilam Province, Iran. At the 2006 census, its population was 47, in 10 families. The village is populated by Kurds.
