= Church of God (Seventh Day) =

Collection of sabbath-keeping churches

- Classification: Protestant
- Orientation: Arminianism, Premillennialism, Mortalism (Conditional Immortality)
- Polity: Congregational (with regional and national conferences)
- Moderator: Elder Loren Stacy
- Headquarters: Denver, Colorado, United States
- Territory: Worldwide (conferences active in over 40 countries)
- Founder: Gilbert Cranmer
- Origin: Western Michigan, United States
- Separated from: Millerites / Early Sabbatarian Adventists (rejected the visions of Ellen G. White)
- Congregations: ~235 (United States and Canada)
- Members: ~150,000 (worldwide)
- Official website: cog7.org

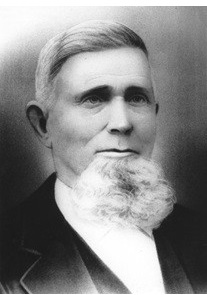
Gilbert Cranmer

The Churches of God (Seventh Day) is composed of a number of sabbath-keeping churches, among which the General Conference of the Church of God, or simply CoG7, is the best-known organization. The Churches of God (Seventh Day) observe the Sabbath on Saturday, the seventh day of the week.

== History ==
The Church of God (Seventh Day) represents a line of Sabbatarian Adventists that rejected the visions and teachings of Ellen G. White before the formation of the Seventh-day Adventist Church in 1863. Robert Coulter, ex-president and official historian of the General Conference of the Church of God (Seventh Day), in his book The Journey: A History of the Church of God (Seventh Day) (2014) credits Gilbert Cranmer (1814–1903) of Michigan as being the founder of the church. Cranmer was a Christian Connection minister and a biblical Unitarian. He was introduced to Sabbath keeping in 1852 by Joseph Bates, known as the founder and developer of Sabbatarian Adventism. In 1858, five years before the founding of the Seventh-day Adventist Church, a group led by Cranmer separated from the Adventists who supported James Springer White and Ellen G. White. Another independent Sabbatarian Adventist body formed in Iowa in 1860, and joined with the Church of God (Seventh Day) in 1863. A publication called The Hope of Israel (now The Bible Advocate) was started in 1863, and this publication extended the influence of the body into other areas. Through this publication, the doctrines of the second advent and the seventh-day Sabbath were promoted, and other Christians were invited to gather for meetings. This extended the movement into Missouri, Nebraska and other places, and in 1884 the General Conference of the Church of God was organized. They incorporated in 1899, and "(Seventh Day)" was added to the name in 1923. Offices were established in Stanberry, Missouri. A. N. Dugger and C. O. Dodd (1935) wrote a book attempting to trace the Church's history back to the Apostles through various medieval groups that they believed were Sabbath-keeping. In the case of some of these groups, such as the Waldensians and Paulicians, that claim is disputed. A well-publicized member of the church was evangelist Herbert W. Armstrong (1893–1986). In 1927 Armstrong was challenged by his wife, Loma, to find a biblical justification for keeping Sunday as the Christian Sabbath. Loma had come under the influence of Emma Runcorn, a member of the Seventh Day church in the Willamette Valley of Oregon. Runcorn and her husband Ora were lay leaders in the Oregon conference. Armstrong soon became a minister for that church and a writer for the Bible Advocate journal. Within a few years, Armstrong began teaching the British-Israel Theory – the alternative history that regarded the nations of Western Europe and North America as the literal descendants of the "Lost Ten Tribes" of Israel – and the mandatory keeping of the Feast Days and Holy Days as listed in Leviticus 23. Armstrong disassociated himself from the Church of God (7th Day) - Salem Conference over these two issues, which were not original doctrines of the Churches of God (7th Day); years later, Church of God (7th Day) revoked his ministerial credentials with their Church, but by this time he was well-established in his own church, the Radio Church of God.

=== The division of 1933 ===
The following information concerning the division of 1933 is taken from an online history book, History of the Seventh Day Church of God, by Richard C. Nickels. The Church of God (Seventh Day) was unified up until 1933. According to A. N. Dugger a Church of God historian, and leader of one of the factions at the time, many in the Church of God felt the need for a "Bible Organization" for the Church of God. They also wanted to move the church's world headquarters to Jerusalem. They held a conference in Salem, West Virginia, on November 4, 1933. Pressure was mounting for more unity from roughly half of the membership. While others felt that they were being denied freedom of expression. Dugger and his followers wanted a reorganization of church doctrine, including clean meats, no tobacco, and observing the Passover on Nisan 14. While Burt F. Marrs led a group of "independents" who believed pork and tobacco were fine, and that the Passover should be observed on Nisan 15. At this point, Dugger and his followers decided to establish the Salem Conference headquarters in Salem, West Virginia, at which point they started printing the Bible Advocate. As a result, from 1933 to 1949 there were two separate Church of God organizations, one at Stanberry, Missouri, and the other at Salem, West Virginia. The headquarters in Salem still exists today with members worldwide. They are formally organized under the apostolic model (twelve apostles, seventy elders and seven men to oversee the business affairs of the church). Shortly afterwards, Dugger left the Salem Conference.

=== 1940s reunification ===
The following information concerning the reunification in the 1940s is taken from History of the Seventh Day Church of God by Richard C. Nickels. The first attempt for a merger between the Stanberry and Salem Conferences occurred in 1942. A copyright lawsuit concerning the Bible Advocate magazine and the publication of the Bible Home Instructor hindered the merger. In 1947, the Salem Council of Ministers asked Stanberry to appoint a committee to meet with their committee to discuss a new attempt for a merger. The two churches met at Fairview, Oklahoma, on February 12–17, 1948. Because of the laws under which the Stanberry group was incorporated, the earliest possible time the union of the two groups could take place was August 1949. The merger was voted on August 12–20, 1949, and the first issue of the combined Bible Advocate came out on October 3, 1949. Charles Monroe, who wrote A Synoptic History of the Churches of God in the Latter Days, (Facts of Our Faith, January, 1969, pages 12–25) related, "the merger did not unite all of the Church of God."

=== "Back to Salem" movement ===
The following information concerning the "Back to Salem" Movement of 1950 are taken from History of the Seventh Day Church of God by Richard C. Nickels. As early as 1949, ministers F. L. Summers and his son-in-law Chris Royer went back to Salem and established a headquarters there. The "Back to Salem" movement broke into at least three factions: 1. The original Salem people who stayed at Salem with it as headquarters; 2. Dugger and Severson, who went to Jerusalem; and 3. Olson and Groshans, who formed the Seventh Day Church of God in Caldwell, Idaho. The Salem Conference started to publish a magazine, The Advocate of Truth, in February 1950. Salem is purported to believe that the saints will be raptured to the sea of glass while the seven last plagues will be poured out. It differs with the Denver Group in the date for the annual Lord's Supper, which they calculate according to the spring equinox. In September 1952, Dugger, after returning from an extended trip to Nigeria to visit Church of God groups, decided to move to Jerusalem to start The Mount Zion Reporter in 1953. Possibly doctrinal issues led to Dugger's exit to Israel. The 1948/49 Stanberry-Salem Merger of the Church of God (Seventh Day), also known as the Denver Group, contains the largest number of Church of God people today, but it is not the only significant Church of God center. The Stanberry conference, with headquarters moved to Denver, Colorado, typically uses the name General Conference of the Church of God (Seventh Day), with "Seventh" spelled out. A number of Churches of God (7th Day) in Salem, West Virginia still stand with locations all across the United States and around the world. These usually follow a set of 40 points of doctrine.

== Doctrine and practices ==
This section mainly uses the General Conference of the Church of God (Seventh Day) [Denver Conference] Statement of Faith as a reference. Although the doctrinal beliefs among the General Council Churches of God, (Seventh-Day), Inc. in Meridian, Idaho and different Churches of God (7th Day) or (Seventh Day) are very similar, some major points of disagreement still remain, either concerning christological beliefs or church organization. Outlining some beliefs of the Churches of God (7th Day), the Statement of Faith of the General Conference of the Church of God (Seventh Day) - Denver Conference states the following:

- Christology has been a long debated issue in the Churches of God (7th Day). Cranmer, the founder of the Church of God (Seventh Day), left the Methodist Church to join the Christian Connection "over the doctrine of the Trinity". Cranmer was a biblical Unitarian [an Ebionist]. He did not believe Jesus preexisted his birth and he "believed the Father alone is God." According to the Denver Conference, God is revealed in Scripture as Father and Son. From eternity the Son existed with Father and shared His glory (Section 2). This christological belief is a departure from their long-held doctrinal beliefs in that regard. The Denver Conference, part of the greatest Church of God (7th Day) movement, had an Arian christology for much of the twentieth century, before leaving part of their heritage and reverting to a more classical view of Christ. Nota bene: The Salem Conference, the Churches previously affiliated or linked to the Jerusalem Conference and a number of independent Churches of God (7th Day) still believe that Jesus Christ, as the Word of God, is a created being. Some independent churches or individuals retain a biblical Unitarian [Arian] christology. A position paper written by the Jerusalem Conference states the following:

"The Amen, the faithful and the true witness is no one else but Jesus Christ and speaking of himself he said, he is "the beginning of the creation of God" i.e. the very first manifested act of YHWH was the creation of his son Yehoshua (Jesus). Do other scriptures support this? Col 1:15 "Who is the image of the invisible God, the firstborn of every creature". A creature is life which has been created, whether terrestrial or celestial: Colossians supports Revelation, it says of Christ he is "the firstborn of every creature:"

- According to the Denver Conference, salvation is by God's grace, received by faith in Jesus Christ apart from good works, human merit, or ceremony (Section 4). Obedience to the moral law, while not a means to salvation, is encouraged as an important part of Christian living. Eating of unclean meats such as pork and shellfish is discouraged, as is the observance of Christmas and Easter, due to their pagan roots (Section 10). The Salem Conference and churches associated with the Jerusalem Conference strongly discourage the use of tobacco, alcohol and any other drugs as well. Furthermore, according to the Salem Conference, "There are three basic precepts that we must follow in order to obtain salvation and receive the gift of eternal life" : 1) To love the LORD your God; 2) to accept Jesus Christ as your personal savior, repent of our sins, and become baptized in the name of the "Lord Jesus Christ"; and 3) to continually strive for a better understanding of God's truth. According to this same Conference, "The key point here is that in order to be approved unto God, we must study his word. Our salvation depends upon it.".
- Mankind is mortal, and the soul is unconscious in death (Section 3). The wicked who reject Christ until the end will face the judgment of annihilation, not eternal torment in hellfire (Section 12).
- Two church ordinances are observed—baptism by immersion and an annual Lord's supper service (with washing of feet), observed annually on the day of Jesus's death, Nisan 14 (Section 6).
- On tithing, the Denver Conference differs from the Salem Conference and the churches associated with the Jerusalem headquarters. The Salem and Jerusalem Churches of God (7th Day) still believe tithing to be an obligation for believers today. According to the Salem Conference: "All members of God's church are required to contribute a tenth part of their increase to the work of the church", a statement to which the Jerusalem Churches and other churches more or less related to that conference agree as stated in their 40 Points of Doctrine that reads: "The paying of tithes on all increase is a continued obligation. This portion of our earnings belongs to יהוה, and should be placed in his work. Malachi 3:10; Matthew 23:23".
- All three groups object to military service and participation in physical warfare. The Salem and Jerusalem Conferences have a stronger stance on the question, condemning participation in "carnal warfare" rather than simply discouraging it.
- A peculiarity, the Church of God (7th Day) - Salem Conference is organized according to the "apostolic model." They currently have twelve apostles, seventy prophets and seven stewards. This belief may be found on page 13 of their doctrinal statement of beliefs. An article for their FAQs section states:

Jesus Christ is the head of the Church of God (7th Day). Jesus set the organization of the church to have twelve apostles who are responsible for governing the church and seventy ministers to help spread the gospel. Seven stewards were then choosen [sic] by the apostles to oversee the financial matters of the church. Members of the twelve and seventy are to be chosen by God through the casting of lots."

- Still another group, with headquarters located in Meridian, Idaho, object to the hierarchical form of church governance found in the Denver Conference and in the Salem Conference. This group, the General Council of the Churches of God (Seventh Day) Inc., favors a congregationalist polity for the Church. According to them:

The Church of God (7th day) is, historically, congregational in polity. We desire that our churches and their members continue to enjoy this blessed freedom of local autonomy.

- The Jerusalem Conference still believe that headcovering is mandatory for women in public worship.

== Membership ==
As of 2010, the General Conference of the Church of God (Seventh Day) has 233 congregations in the United States and Canada, with an estimated 14,000 members. As for the Denver Conference, the worldwide membership in its International Ministerial Congress is over 200,000 members, with affiliated ministries in more than 40 countries. Central offices for the US and Canada local churches are in Denver as of 2015, with Elder Loren Stacy serving as president. The Denver Conference is a member of the Bible Sabbath Association (org. 1943), an organization promoting "fellowship and cooperation between Sabbath-keepers of various groups." The Salem conference has members in South Africa.

== See also ==
- Adventism
- Millerism
- Sabbath in Christianity
- Sacred Name movement
