= History of agriculture in the Indian subcontinent =

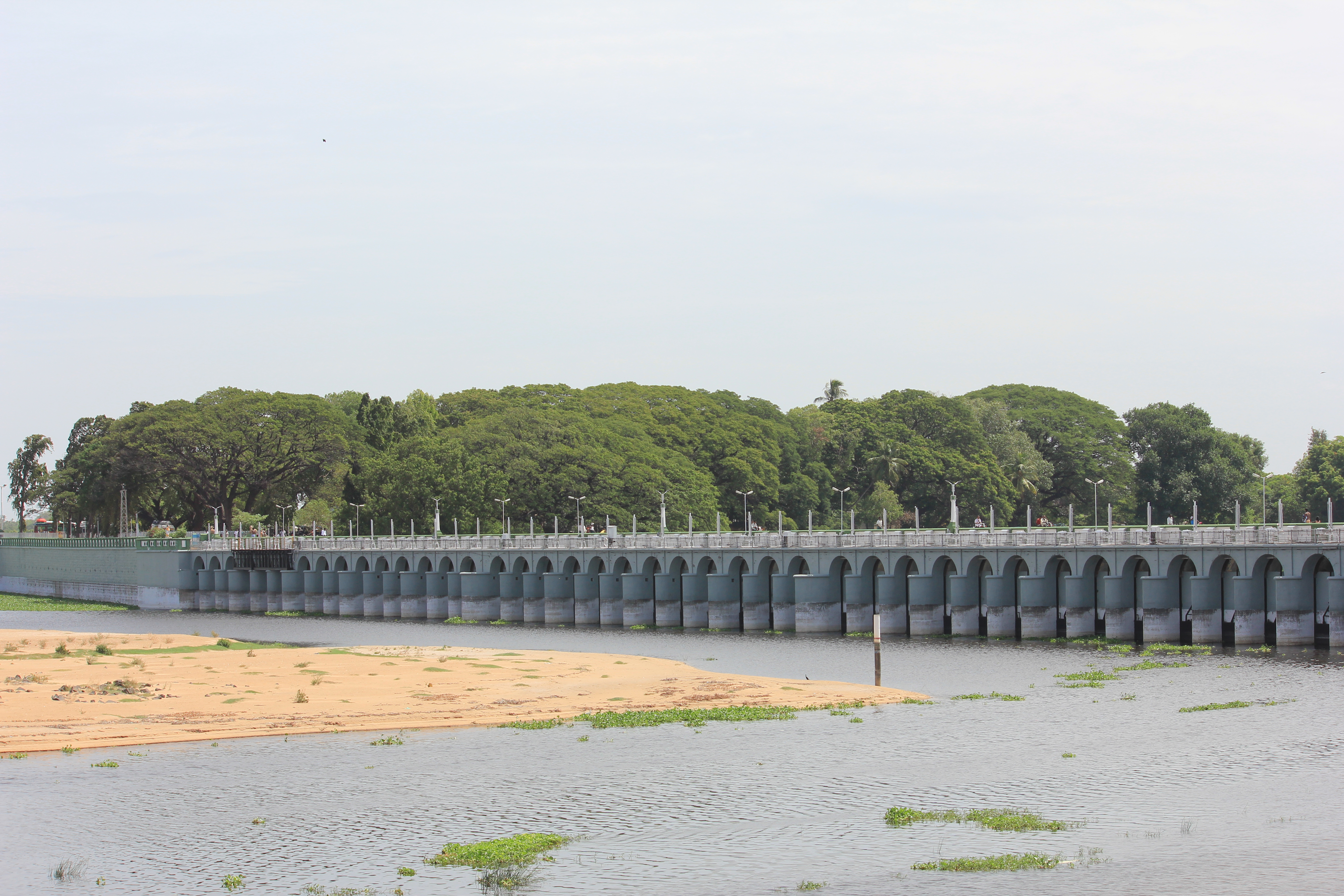
Grand Anicut dam on river Kaveri (1st-2nd Century CE) is one of the oldest water-regulation structures in the world still in use.

The oldest evidence for Indian agriculture is in north-west Indian subcontinent dates from the Neolithic c. 8000-6000 BCE, with traces of the cultivation of plants and domestication of crops and animals. India was the largest producer of wheat and grain. Then settled life soon followed with implements and techniques being developed for agriculture. Double monsoons led to two harvests being reaped in one year. Indian products soon reached the world via existing trading networks and foreign crops were introduced to India. Plants and animals—considered essential to their survival by the Indians—came to be worshiped and venerated.

The Middle Ages saw irrigation channels reach a new level of sophistication in India and Indian crops affecting the economies of other regions of the world. Land and water management systems were developed with an aim of providing uniform growth. Despite some stagnation during the later modern era the independent Republic of India was able to develop a comprehensive agricultural programme.

== Early history ==
=== Neolithic ===
In the period of the Neolithic Revolution, roughly 8000-4000 BCE, Agro pastoralism in India included threshing, planting crops in rows and storing grain in granaries. Barley —either of two or of six rows— and wheat cultivation—along with the rearing of cattle, sheep and goat—was visible in Mehrgarh by 8000-6000 BCE.

According to Gangal et al. (2014), there is strong archeological and geographical evidence that neolithic farming spread from the Near East into north-west India. (Note: Gangal et al. (2014): "There are several lines of evidence that support the idea of connection between the Neolithic in the Near East and in the Indian subcontinent. The prehistoric site of Mehrgarh in Baluchistan (modern Pakistan) is the earliest Neolithic site in the north-west Indian subcontinent, dated as early as 8500 BCE. Neolithic domesticated crops in Mehrgarh include more than 90% barley and a small amount of wheat. There is good evidence for the local domestication of barley and the zebu cattle at Mehrgarh, but the wheat varieties are suggested to be of Near-Eastern origin, as the modern distribution of wild varieties of wheat is limited to Northern Levant and Southern Turkey. A detailed satellite map study of a few archaeological sites in the Baluchistan and Khybar Pakhtunkhwa regions also suggests similarities in early phases of farming with sites in Western Asia. Pottery prepared by sequential slab construction, circular fire pits filled with burnt pebbles, and large granaries are common to both Mehrgarh and many Mesopotamian sites. The postures of the skeletal remains in graves at Mehrgarh bear strong resemblance to those at Ali Kosh in the Zagros Mountains of southern Iran. Clay figurines found in Mehrgarh resemble those discovered at Zaghe on the Qazvin plain south of the Elburz range in Iran (the 7th millennium BCE) and Jeitun in Turkmenistan (the 6th millennium BCE). Strong arguments have been made for the Near-Eastern origin of some domesticated plants and herd animals at Jeitun in Turkmenistan. The Near East is separated from the Indus Valley by the arid plateaus, ridges and deserts of Iran and Afghanistan, where rainfall agriculture is possible only in the foothills and cul-de-sac valleys. Nevertheless, this area was not an insurmountable obstacle for the dispersal of the Neolithic. The route south of the Caspian sea is a part of the Silk Road, some sections of which were in use from at least 3,000 BCE, connecting Badakhshan (north-eastern Afghanistan and south-eastern Tajikistan) with Western Asia, Egypt and India. Similarly, the section from Badakhshan to the Mesopotamian plains (the Great Khorasan Road) was apparently functioning by 4,000 BCE and numerous prehistoric sites are located along it, whose assemblages are dominated by the Cheshmeh-Ali (Tehran Plain) ceramic technology, forms and designs. Striking similarities in figurines and pottery styles, and mud-brick shapes, between widely separated early Neolithic sites in the Zagros Mountains of north-western Iran (Jarmo and Sarab), the Deh Luran Plain in southwestern Iran (Tappeh Ali Kosh and Chogha Sefid), Susiana (Chogha Bonut and Chogha Mish), the Iranian Central Plateau (Tappeh-Sang-e Chakhmaq), and Turkmenistan (Jeitun) suggest a common incipient culture. The Neolithic dispersal across South Asia plausibly involved migration of the population ( and pp. 231–233). This possibility is also supported by Y-chromosome and mtDNA analyses.") Yet, Jean-Francois Jarrige argues for an independent origin of Mehrgarh. Jarrige notes the similarities between Neolithic sites from eastern Mesopotamia and the western Indus valley, which are evidence of a "cultural continuum" between those sites. Nevertheless, Jarrige concludes that Mehrgarh has an earlier local background," and is not a "'backwater' of the Neolithic culture of the Near East." Singh et al. (2016) investigated the distribution of J2a-M410 and J2b-M102 in South Asia, which "suggested a complex scenario that cannot be explained by a single wave of agricultural expansion from Near East to South Asia," but also note that "regardless of the complexity of dispersal, NW region appears to be the corridor for entry of these haplogroups into India."

By the 5th millennium BCE agricultural communities became widespread in Kashmir. Zaheer Baber (1996) writes that 'the first evidence of cultivation of cotton had already developed'. Cotton was cultivated by the 5th millennium BCE-4th millennium BCE. The Indus cotton industry was well developed and some methods used in cotton spinning and fabrication continued to be practiced till the modern Industrialisation of India.

A variety of tropical fruits such as mango and melon are native to the Indian subcontinent. The Indians also domesticated hemp, which they used for a number of applications including making narcotics, fiber, and oil. The farmers of the Indus Valley, which thrived in modern-day Pakistan and North India, grew peas, sesame, and dates. Sugarcane was originally from tropical South Asia and Southeast Asia. Different species likely originated in different locations with S. barberi originating in India and S. edule and S. officinarum coming from New Guinea.

Wild rice cultivation appeared in the Belan and Ganges valley regions of northern India as early as 4530 BCE and 5440 BCE respectively. Rice was cultivated in the Indus Valley civilisation. Agricultural activity during the second millennium BC included rice cultivation in the Kashmir and Harrappan regions. Mixed farming was the basis of the Indus valley economy. Denis J. Murphy (2007) details the spread of cultivated rice from India into South-east Asia:

Several wild cereals, including rice, grew in the Vindhyan Hills, and rice cultivation, at sites such as Chopani-Mando and Mahagara, may have been underway as early as 7000 BP. The relative isolation of this area and the early development of rice farming imply that it was developed indigenously...Chopin-Mando and Mahagara are located on the upper reaches of the Ganges drainage system and it is likely that migrants from this area spread rice farming down the Ganges valley into the fertile plains of Bengal, and beyond into south-east Asia.

=== Indus Valley Civilization ===
Irrigation was developed in the Indus Valley civilisation by around 4500 BCE. The size and prosperity of the Indus civilisation grew as a result of this innovation, which eventually led to more planned settlements making use of drainage and sewers. Sophisticated irrigation and water storage systems were developed by the Indus Valley Civilisation, including artificial reservoirs at Girnar dated to 3000 BCE, and an early canal irrigation system from circa 2600 BCE. Archaeological evidence of an animal-drawn plough dates back to 2500 BC in the Indus Valley Civilisation.

Outside the Indus Valley area of influence there are 2 regions with distinct agricultures dating back to around 2800-1500 BCE. These are the Deccan Plateau and an area within the modern states of Orissa and Bihar. Within the Deccan the ashmound tradition developed c.2800 BCE. This is characterised by large mounds of burned cattle dung and other materials. The people of the ashmound tradition grew millets and pulses, some of which were domesticated in this part of India, for example, Brachiaria ramosa, Setaria verticillata, Vigna radiata and Macrotyloma uniflorum. They also herded cattle, sheep and goat and were largely engaged in pastoralism (Fuller 2006, 'Dung mounds and Domesticators'). In the east of India Neolithic people grew rice and pulses, as well as keeping cattle, sheep and goat. By 1500 BCE a distinct agriculture focused on summer crops, including Vigna and Panicum milliaceum was developed.

== Iron Age India (1500 BCE – 200 CE) ==
Gupta (2004) finds it likely that summer monsoons may have been longer and may have contained moisture in excess than required for normal food production. One effect of this excessive moisture would have been to aid the winter monsoon rainfall required for winter crops. In India, both wheat and barley are held to be Rabi (winter) crops and—like other parts of the world—would have largely depended on winter monsoons before the irrigation became widespread. The growth of the Kharif crops would have probably suffered as a result of excessive moisture. Jute was first cultivated in India, where it was used to make ropes and cordage. Some animals—thought by the Indians as being vital to their survival—came to be worshiped. Trees were also domesticated, worshiped, and venerated—Pipal and Banyan in particular. Others came to be known for their medicinal uses and found mention in the holistic medical system Ayurveda. The History of Agriculture by Britannica Educational Publishing holds that:

In the later Vedic texts (c. 3000 -2500 BP) there are repeated references to agricultural technology and practices, including iron implements; the cultivation of...cereals, vegetables, and fruits; the use of meat and milk...and animal husbandry. Farmers plowed the soil...broadcast seeds, and used a certain sequence of cropping and fallowing. Cow dung provided fertilizer, and irrigation was practiced...

The Mauryan Empire (322–185 BCE) categorised soils and made meteorological observations for agricultural use. Other Mauryan facilitation included construction and maintenance of dams, and provision of horse-drawn chariots—quicker than traditional bullock carts. The Greek diplomat Megasthenes (c. 300 BC)—in his book Indika— provides a secular eyewitness account of Indian agriculture:

India has many huge mountains which abound in fruit-trees of every kind, and many vast plains of great fertility. . . . The greater part of the soil, moreover, is under irrigation, and consequently bears two crops in the course of the year. . . . In addition to cereals, there grows throughout India much millet . . . and much pulse of different sorts, and rice also, and what is called bosporum [Indian millet]. . . . Since there is a double rainfall [i.e., the two monsoons] in the course of each year . . . the inhabitants of India almost always gather in two harvests annually.

== Early Common Era – High Middle Ages (200–1200 CE) ==
The Tamil people cultivated a wide range of crops such as rice, sugarcane, millets, pepper, various cereal grains, coconuts, beans, cotton, plantain, tamarind and sandalwood. Jackfruit, coconut, palm, areca and plantain trees were also known. Systematic ploughing, manuring, weeding, irrigation and crop protection was practiced for sustained agriculture. Water storage systems were designed during this period. Kallanai (1st-2nd century CE), a dam built on river Kaveri during this period, is considered to be one of the oldest water-regulation structures in the world still in use.

Spice trade involving spices native to India—including cinnamon and black pepper—gained momentum as India started shipping spices to the Mediterranean. Roman trade with India followed as detailed by the archaeological record and the Periplus of the Erythraean Sea. Chinese sericulture attracted Indian sailors during the early centuries of the common era. Crystallised sugar was discovered by the time of the Guptas (320-550 CE), and the earliest reference of candied sugar come from India. The process was soon transmitted to China with traveling Buddhist monks. Chinese documents confirm at least two missions to India, initiated in 647 CE, for obtaining technology for sugar-refining. Each mission returned with results on refining sugar. Indian spice exports find mention in the works of Ibn Khurdadhbeh (850), al-Ghafiqi (1150), Ishak bin Imaran (907) and Al Kalkashandi (fourteenth century).

Noboru Karashima's research of the agrarian society in South India during the Chola Empire (875–1279) reveals that during the Chola rule land was transferred and collective holding of land by a group of people slowly gave way to individual plots of land, each with their own irrigation system. The growth of individual disposition of farming property may have led to a decrease in areas of dry cultivation. The Cholas also had bureaucrats which oversaw the distribution of water—-particularly the distribution of water by tank-and-channel networks to the drier areas.

== Late Middle Ages (1200–1526 CE) ==
The construction of water works and aspects of water technology in Medieval India is described in Arabic and Persian works. The diffusion of Indian and Persian irrigation technologies gave rise to an irrigation systems which brought about economic growth and growth of material culture. Agricultural 'zones' were broadly divided into those producing rice, wheat or millets. Rice production continued to dominate Gujarat and wheat dominated north and central India.

Sugar mills appeared in India shortly during this era. Evidence for the use of a draw bar for sugar-milling appears at Delhi in 1540, but may date back earlier, and was mainly used in the northern Indian subcontinent. Geared sugar rolling mills later appeared in Mughal India, using the principle of rollers as well as worm gearing, by the 17th century.

== Early modern Era (1526–1857 CE) ==
Indian agricultural production increased under the Mughal Empire, during which India's population growth accelerated. A variety of crops were grown, including food crops such as wheat, rice, and barley, and non-food cash crops such as cotton, indigo and opium. By the mid-17th century, Indian cultivators begun to extensively grow two new crops from the Americas, maize and tobacco.

Land management was particularly strong during the regime of Akbar the Great (reigned 1556–1605), under whom scholar-bureaucrat Todarmal formulated and implemented elaborated methods for agricultural management on a rational basis. Indian crops—such as cotton, sugar, and citric fruits—spread visibly throughout North Africa, Islamic Spain, and the Middle East. Though they may have been in cultivation prior to the solidification of Islam in India, their production was further improved as a result of this recent wave, which led to far-reaching economic outcomes for the regions involved.

The Mughal administration emphasized agrarian reform, which began under the Sur emperor Sher Shah Suri, the work of which Akbar adopted and furthered with more reforms. The civil administration was organized in a hierarchical manner on the basis of merit, with promotions based on performance. The Mughal government funded the building of irrigation systems across the empire, which produced much higher crop yields and increased the net revenue base, leading to increased agricultural production.

A major Mughal reform introduced by Akbar was a new land revenue system called zabt. He replaced the tribute system, previously common in India and used by Tokugawa Japan at the time, with a monetary tax system based on a uniform currency. The revenue system was based in favour of higher value cash crops such as cotton, indigo, sugar cane, tree-crops, and opium, providing state incentives to grow cash crops, in addition to rising market demand. Under the zabt system, the Mughals also conducted extensive cadastral surveying to assess the area of land under plow cultivation, with the Mughal state encouraging greater land cultivation by offering tax-free periods to those who brought new land under cultivation.

Indian agriculture was advanced compared to Europe at the time, such as the common use of the seed drill among Indian farmers before its adoption in European agriculture. While the average farmer across the world was only skilled in growing very few crops, the average Indian farmer was skilled in growing a wide variety of food and non-food crops, increasing their productivity. Indian farmers were also quick to adapt to profitable new crops, such as maize and tobacco from the New World being rapidly adopted and widely cultivated across Mughal India between 1600 and 1650. Bengali farmers rapidly learned techniques of mulberry cultivation and sericulture, establishing Bengal Subah as a major silk-producing region of the world.

The History of Agriculture by Britannica Educational Publishing details the many crops introduced to India during this period of extensive global discourse:

Cultivation of tobacco, introduced by the Portuguese spread rapidly. The Malabār Coast was the home of spices, especially black pepper, that had stimulated the first European adventures in the East. Coffee had been imported from Abyssinia and became a popular beverage in aristocratic circles by the end of the century. Tea, which was to become the commoner's drink and a major export, was yet undiscovered, though it was growing wild in the hills of Assam. Vegetables were cultivated mainly in the vicinity of towns. New species of fruit, such as the pineapple, papaya, and cashew nut, also were introduced by the Portuguese. The quality of mango and citrus fruits was greatly improved.

According to evidence cited by the economic historians Immanuel Wallerstein, Irfan Habib, Percival Spear, and Ashok Desai, per-capita agricultural output and standards of consumption in 17th-century Mughal India was on-par with or higher than in 17th-century Europe and early 20th-century British India. The increased agricultural productivity led to lower food prices; compared to Britain, the price of grain was about one-half in South India and one-third in Bengal, in terms of silver, in the 18th century.

== Colonial Era (1857–1947 CE) ==
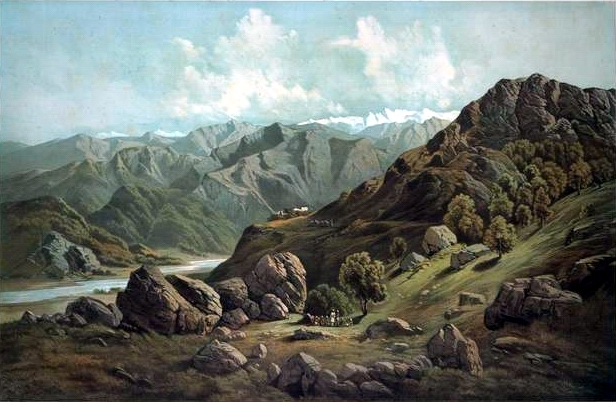
Sutlej Valley from Rampur ca. 1857. A number of irrigation canals are located on the Sutlej river.

Few Indian commercial crops—such as Cotton, indigo, opium, wheat, and rice—made it to the global market under the British Raj in India. The second half of the 19th century saw some increase in land under cultivation and agricultural production expanded at an average rate of about 1% per year by the later 19th century. Due to extensive irrigation by canal networks Punjab, Narmada valley, and Andhra Pradesh became centres of agrarian reforms. Roy (2006) comments on the Influence of the world wars on the Indian agricultural system:

Agricultural performance in the interwar period (1918–1939) was dismal. From 1891 to 1946, the annual growth rate of all crop output was 0.4 %, and food-grain output was practically stagnant. There were significant regional and intercrop differences, however, nonfood crops doing better than food crops. Among food crops, by far the most important source of stagnation was rice. Bengal had below-average growth rates in both food and nonfood crop output, whereas Punjab and Madras were the least stagnant regions. In the interwar period, population growth accelerated while food output decelerated, leading to declining availability of food per head. The crisis was most acute in Bengal, where food output declined at an annual rate of about 0.7 % from 1921 to 1946, when population grew at an annual rate of about 1 %.

The British regime in India did supply the irrigation works but rarely on the scale required. Community effort and private investment soared as market for irrigation developed. Agricultural prices of some commodities rose to about three times between 1870 and 1920.

A rich source of the state of Indian agriculture in the early British era is a report prepared by a British engineer, Thomas Barnard, and his Indian guide, Raja Chengalvaraya Mudaliar, around 1774. This report contains data of agricultural production in about 800 villages in the area around Chennai in the years 1762 to 1766. This report is available in Tamil in the form of palm leaf manuscripts at Thanjavur Tamil University, and in English in the Tamil Nadu State Archives. A series of articles in The Hindu newspaper in the early 1990s authored by researchers at The Centre for Policy Studies led by Shri Dharampal highlight the impressive production statistics of Indian farmers of that era.

== Republic of India (1947 CE onwards) ==
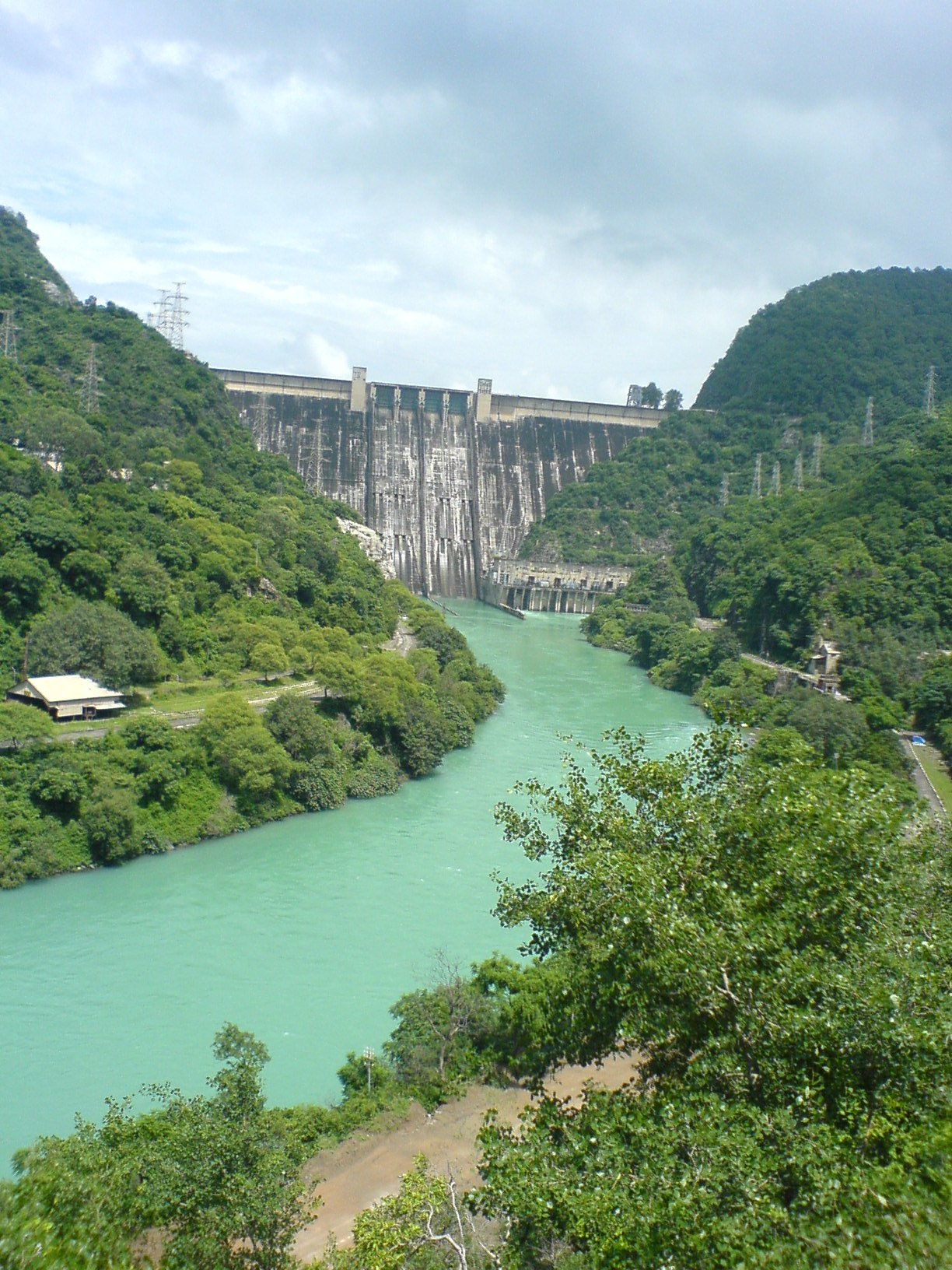
Bhakra Dam (completed 1963) is the largest dam in India.

Special programmes were undertaken to improve food and cash crops supply. The Grow More Food Campaign (1940s) and the Integrated Production Programme (1950s) focused on food and cash crops supply respectively. Five-year plans of India—oriented towards agricultural development—soon followed. Land reclamation, land development, mechanisation, electrification, use of chemicals—fertilisers in particular, and development of agriculture oriented 'package approach' of taking a set of actions instead of promoting single aspect soon followed under government supervision. The many 'production revolutions' initiated from 1960s onwards included Green Revolution in India, Yellow Revolution (oilseed: 1986–1990), Operation Flood (dairy: 1970–1996), and Blue Revolution (fishing: 1973–2002) etc. Following the economic reforms of 1991, significant growth was registered in the agricultural sector, which was by now benefiting from the earlier reforms and the newer innovations of Agro-processing and Biotechnology.

Due to the growth and prosperity that followed India's economic reforms a strong middle class emerged as the main consumer of fruits, dairy, fish, meat and vegetables—a marked shift from the earlier staple based consumption. Since 1991, changing consumption patterns led to a 'revolution' in 'high crop value' agriculture while the need for cereals is experienced a decline. The per capita consumption of cereals declined from 192 to 152 kilograms from 1977 to 1999 while the consumption of fruits increased by 553%, vegetables by 167%, dairy products by 105%, and non-vegetarian products by 85% in India's rural areas alone. Urban areas experienced a similar increase.

Agricultural exports continued to grow at well over 10.1% annually through the 1990s. Contract farming—which requires the farmers to produce crops for a company under contract—and high value agricultural product increased. Contract farming led to a decrease in transaction costs while the contract farmers made more profit compared to the non-contract workforce. However, small landholding continued to create problems for India's farmers as the limited land resulted in limited produce and limited profits.

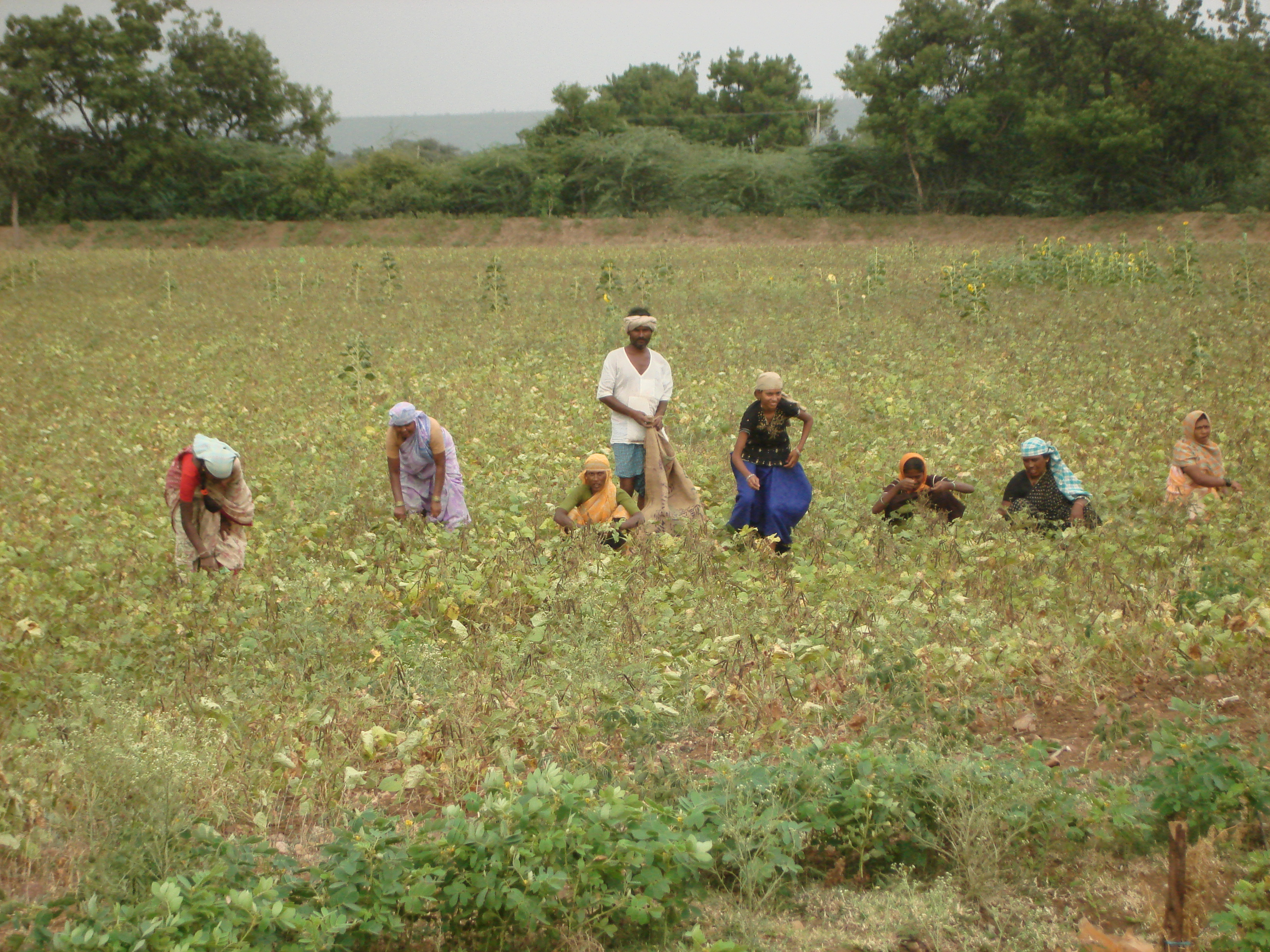
Some Indian farmers.

The 1991 reforms also contributed to a rise in suicides by indebted farmers in India following crop failures (e.g. Bt cotton). Various studies identify the important factors as the withdrawal of government support, insufficient or risky credit systems, the difficulty of farming semi-arid regions, poor agricultural income, absence of alternative income opportunities, a downturn in the urban economy which forced non-farmers into farming, and the absence of suitable counseling services.

Since independence, India has become one of the largest producers of wheat, edible oil, potato, spices, rubber, tea, fishing, fruits, and vegetables in the world. The Ministry of Agriculture oversees activities relating to agriculture in India. Various institutions for agriculture related research in India were organised under the Indian Council of Agricultural Research (est. 1929). Other organisations such as the National Dairy Development Board (est. 1965), and National Bank for Agriculture and Rural Development (est. 1982) aided the formation of cooperatives and improved financing.

The contribution of agriculture in employing India's male workforce decreased from 75.9% in 1961 to 60% in 1999–2000. Dev (2006) holds that 'there were about 45 million agricultural labor households in the country in 1999–2000.' These households recorded the highest incidence of poverty in India from 1993 to 2000. The green revolution introduced high yielding varieties of crops which also increased the usage of fertilisers and pesticides. About 90% of the pesticide usage in India is accounted for by DDT and Lindane (BHC/HCH). There has been a shift to organic agriculture particularly for exported commodities.

During 2003–04, agriculture accounted for 22% of India's GDP and employed 58% of the country's workforce. India is the world's largest producer of milk, fruits, cashew nuts, coconuts, ginger, turmeric, banana, sapota, pulses, and black pepper. India is the second largest producer of groundnut, wheat, vegetables, sugar and fish in the world. India is also the second largest producer of tobacco and rice, the fourth largest producer of coarse grains, the fifth largest producer of eggs, and the seventh largest producer of meat.

== See also ==
- Early Indians
- Agriculture in India
- Fishing in India
- Livestock in India
- Forestry in India

== Sources ==
- Agarwal, Ankit (2011), "Theory of Optimum Utilisation of Resources in agriculture during the Gupta Period", History Today 12, New Delhi, ISSN 2249-748X.
- Baber, Zaheer (1996), The Science of Empire: Scientific Knowledge, Civilisation, and Colonial Rule in India, State University of New York Press, ISBN 0-7914-2919-9.
- Bhattacharyya, P.; Chakraborty, G. (2005). "Current status of organic farming in India and other countries". Indian Journal of Fertilisers. 1 (9): 111–123.
- Balambal, V. (1998), Studies in the History of the Sangam Age, Kalinga Publications.
- Dev, S. M. (2006), "Agricultural Labor and Wages since 1950", Encyclopedia of India (vol. 1) edited by Stanley Wolpert, pp. 17–20, Thomson Gale, ISBN 0-684-31350-2.
- Donkin, Robin A. (2003), Between East and West: The Moluccas and the Traffic in Spices Up to the Arrival of Europeans, Diane Publishing Company, ISBN 0-87169-248-1.
- Gangal, Kavita; Sarson, Graeme R.; Shukurov, Anvar (2014), "The Near-Eastern Roots of the Neolithic in South Asia", PLOS ONE, 9 (5) e95714, Bibcode:2014PLoSO...995714G, doi:10.1371/journal.pone.0095714, PMC 4012948, PMID 24806472
- Gulati, A. (2006), "Agricultural Growth and Diversification since 1991", Encyclopedia of India (vol. 1) edited by Stanley Wolpert, pp. 14–17, Thomson Gale, ISBN 0-684-31350-2.
- Gupta, Anil K. (2004). "Origin of agriculture and domestication of plants and animals linked to early Holocene climate amelioration". Current Science, 87 (1), Indian Academy of Sciences.
- Harris, David R. & Gosden, C. (1996), The origins and spread of agriculture and pastoralism in Eurasia: Crops, Fields, Flocks And Herds, Routledge, ISBN 1-85728-538-7.
- Kahn, Charles (2005), World History: Societies of the Past, Portage & Main Press, ISBN 1-55379-045-6.
- Kieschnick, John (2003), The Impact of Buddhism on Chinese Material Culture, Princeton University Press, ISBN 0-691-09676-7.
- Krebs, Robert E. & Krebs, Carolyn A. (2003), Groundbreaking Scientific Experiments, Inventions, and Discoveries of the Ancient World, Greenwood Publishing Group, ISBN 0-313-31342-3.
- Kumar, R. (2005), "Land Records-Issues and Innovations: A case study of Bhojpur, Bihar", Computerisation of land records edited by Wajahat Habibullah & Manoj Ahuja, Sage Publications, ISBN 0-7619-3347-6.
- Lal, R (2001). "Thematic evolution of ISTRO: transition in scientific issues and research focus from 1955 to 2000". Soil and Tillage Research. 61 (1–2): 3–12 [3]. Bibcode:2001STilR..61....3L. doi:10.1016/s0167-1987(01)00184-2.
- Murphy, Denis J. (2007), People, Plants and Genes: The Story of Crops and Humanity, Oxford University Press, ISBN 0-19-920713-5.
- Palat, R. A. (1995), "Historical Transformations in Agrarian systems Based on Wet-Rice Cultivation: Toward an Alternative Model of Social Change", Food and Agrarian Orders in the World-Economy edited by Philip McMichael, Greenwood Publishing Group, ISBN 0-313-29399-6.
- Possehl, Gregory L. (1996), "Mehrgarh", Oxford Companion to Archaeology edited by Brian Fagan, Oxford University Press.
- George A. Grierson (1885). Bihar Peasant Life. Bengal Secretariat Press, Calcutta.
- Pillay, J.K. (1972), Educational system of the ancient Tamils, Madras.
- Pimentel, D.; Pimentel, M. (1990). "Comment: Adverse Environmental Consequences of the Green Revolution". Population and Development Review. 16: 329–332. doi:10.2307/2808081. JSTOR 2808081.
- Ray (1985). "Pesticides – environmental problem". Science and Culture. 57: 363–371.
- Rodda & Ubertini (2004), The Basis of Civilisation-Water Science?, International Association of Hydrological Science, ISBN 1-901502-57-0.
- Roy, T. (2006), "Agricultural Prices and Production, 1757–1947", Encyclopedia of India (vol. 1) edited by Stanley Wolpert, pp. 20–22, Thomson Gale, ISBN 0-684-31350-2.
- Shaffer, Lynda (2000), "Southernisation", Agricultural and Pastoral Societies in Ancient and Classical History edited by Michael Adas, Temple University Press, ISBN 1-56639-832-0.
- Sharpe, Peter (1998), Sugar Cane: Past and Present, Southern Illinois University.
- Siddiqui, Iqtidar Husain (1986). "Water Works and Irrigation System in India during Pre-Mughal Times". Journal of the Economic and Social History of the Orient. 29 (1): 52–77. doi:10.2307/3632072. JSTOR 3632072.
- Singh, Vijay P. & Yadava, R. N. (2003), Water Resources System Operation: Proceedings of the International Conference on Water and Environment, Allied Publishers, ISBN 81-7764-548-X.
- Singh, Sakshi (2016), "Dissecting the influence of Neolithic demic diffusion on Indian Y-chromosome pool through J2-M172 haplogroup", Sci. Rep., 6 19157, Bibcode:2016NatSR...619157S, doi:10.1038/srep19157, PMC 4709632, PMID 26754573
- Smith, C. Wayne (2000), Sorghum: Origin, History, Technology, and Production, John Wiley and Sons, ISBN 0-471-24237-3.
- Stein, Burton (1998), A History of India, Blackwell Publishing, ISBN 0-631-20546-2.
- Thulasamma, L. (2006), "Technical Change in Agriculture, 1952–2000", Encyclopedia of India (vol. 4) edited by Stanley Wolpert, pp. 143–148, Thomson Gale, ISBN 0-684-31353-7.
- Venkata Subramanian, T.K. (1988), Environment and urbanisation in early Tamilakam, Thanjavur: Tamil University.
- Wisseman, S. U. & Williams, W. S. (1994), Ancient Technologies and Archaeological Materials, Routledge, ISBN 2-88124-632-X.
