= Dogar =

Clan of India and Pakistan

The Dogar are a Punjabi people of Muslim heritage (bradari). 'Dogar' is commonly used as a last name.

== History ==
The Dogar people settled in Punjab during the Medieval period. They have been classified as a branch of the Rajput (a large cluster of interrelated peoples from the Indian subcontinent). Initially a pastoral people, the Dogar took up agriculture in the Punjab, where they became owners of land in the relatively arid central area where cultivation required particularly strenuous work. In addition to cultivating crops such as jowar (millet) and wheat, they seem partly to have continued pastoral practices, sometimes as nomads. The arid conditions proved challenging, especially in the light of competition from peoples with more established agricultural ways (notably the Jats), and over the centuries the Dogars developed a long-lasting reputation for marauding behaviour, such as animal raiding and other types of theft, including highway robbery.

In the late 17th century, the Dogars residing within the faujdari of Lakhi Jangal (in present-day Multan) were among the tribes that challenged the authority of the Mughal emperor Aurangzeb.

== In literature ==
In the Sufi poet Waris Shah's tragic romance of 1766, Heer Ranjha, Dogars are scorned as commoners (along with Jats and other agricultural groups).

== See also ==
- Lakhi Jungle
